= Kipunada =

- Kushan Ruler
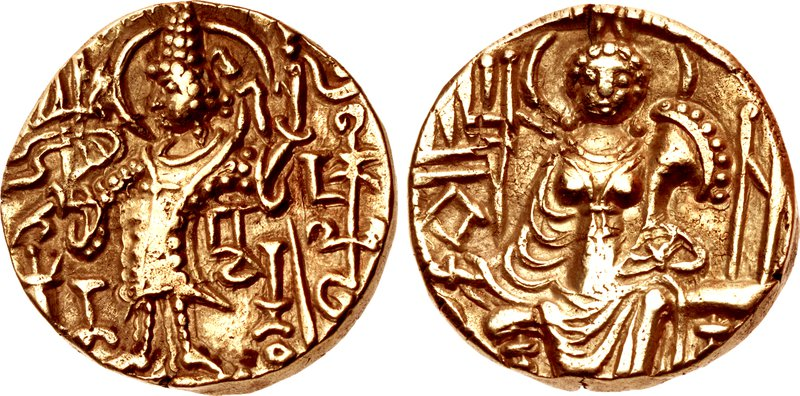
- Coin of Kipunada. Circa 335-350 CE. Obverse: Kipunada standing left, sacrificing over altar. To the right, name vertically in Brahmi script in monogrammic form: Ki-pu-ṇa. Under the ruler's arm: Bacharnatha. Reverse: Ardoxsho enthroned facing, holding investiture garland and cornucopia.
- Reign: 335-350 CE
- Coronation: 335 CE
- Predecessor: Shaka I
- Successor: Kidarites
- Born: 297 CE
- Burial: 350 CE

Kipunada (Brahmi script: Ki-pu-ṇa-dha), also Kipanadha, was probably the last ruler of the Kushan Empire around 335-350 CE. He is known for his gold coinage. He succeeded Shaka I. Kipunada was probably only a local ruler in the area stretching from Waisa to Taxila, in northwestern Punjab, and he may have been a subject of Gupta Emperor Samudragupta.

== Gupta and Kidarite successors ==
The coins of Kipunada in Central and Western Punjab were followed by peculiar coins minted locally in Punjab, with the name "Samudra" on them (Gupta script:), presumably connected to the Gupta Empire ruler Samudragupta. Soon after this, coinage was issued in Punjab by Kidarite Hun rulers known as Kirada, Peroz and then the famous Kidara, who occupied the territory formerly held by the Kushans.

Kipunada lost his independence directly to the invading Hunas who had invaded northern India and acted as a local ruler of Taxila (alongside Mahi and Shaka) under the suzerainty of the Gupta emperors, while still using the coinage style of the Great Kushans. The Kushano-Sasanian sites, including the coins, extended to Gandhara due to Shapur II's protection of the eastern borders of his Sasanian Empire against the invading Huns/Chionites. His treaties with the Huns resulted in: allowing them to join the Sasanian troops, treating them as allies and allowing his direct control over the east. The Kushano-Sasanian coin series issued by Kidara and a certain Pērōz, in Tokharistan and Gandhara continued. Evidently, Kidara I was the Kushan king who submitted to the Gupta king Samudragupta and accepted Gupta suzerainty.

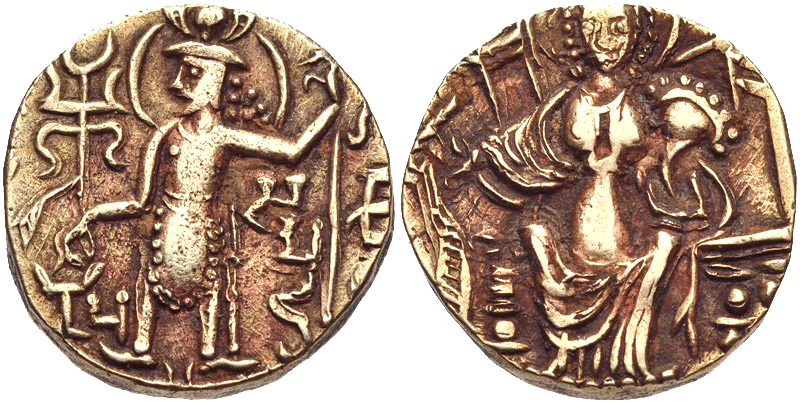
Local coin minted in the Punjab area with the name "Samudra" ( Sa-mu-dra, under the king's left arm), presumably Samudragupta, immediately followed those of Kipunada.

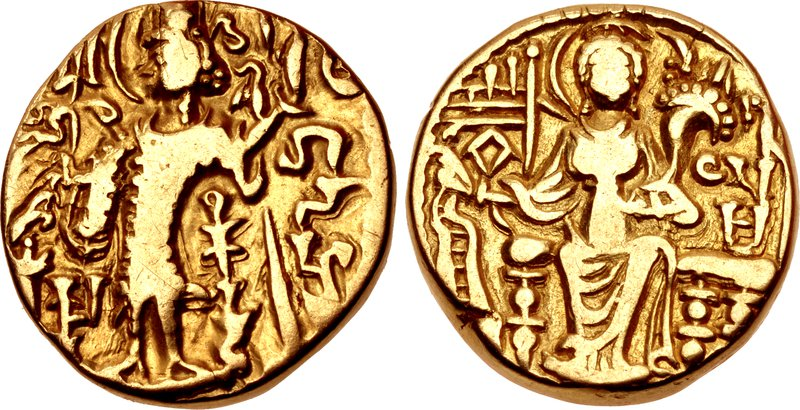
The next coins were those of Kidarite Hun kings, starting with Kirada ( Ki-ra-da under the king's left arm), who ruled circa 350 CE.

Preceded by Shaka I	Kushan Ruler c. 335-350 CE	Succeeded by Gupta Empire/ Kidarites (Kirada)

Territories/ dates	Western India	Western Pakistan Balochistan	Paropamisadae Arachosia	Bajaur	Gandhara	Western Punjab	Eastern Punjab	Mathura	Pataliputra
				INDO-SCYTHIAN KINGDOM			INDO-GREEK KINGDOM	INDO-SCYTHIAN Northern Satraps	
25 BCE – 10 CE				Indo-Scythian dynasty of the APRACHARAJAS; Vijayamitra (ruled 12 BCE – 15 CE) (Note: From the dated inscription on the Rukhana reliquary)	Liaka Kusulaka; Patika Kusulaka; Zeionises	Kharahostes (ruled 10 BCE– 10 CE); Mujatria	Strato II and Strato III	Hagana	
10-20CE		INDO-PARTHIAN KINGDOM; Gondophares		Indravasu	INDO-PARTHIAN KINGDOM; Gondophares		Rajuvula		
20–30 CE			Ubouzanes; Pakores	Vispavarma (ruled c. 0–20 CE)	Sarpedones		Bhadayasa	Sodasa	
30-40 CE			KUSHAN EMPIRE; Kujula Kadphises (c. 50–90)	Indravarma	Abdagases		...	...	
40–45 CE				Aspavarma	Gadana		...	...	
45–50 CE				Sasan	Sases		...	...	
50–75 CE							...	...	
75–100 CE	Indo-Scythian dynasty of the WESTERN SATRAPS; Chastana		Vima Takto (c. 90–113)				...	...	
100–120 CE	Abhiraka		Vima Kadphises (c. 113–127)						
120 CE	Bhumaka; Nahapana	PARATARAJAS; Yolamira	Kanishka I (c. 127–151)				Great Satrap Kharapallana and Satrap Vanaspara for Kanishka I		
130–230 CE	Jayadaman; Rudradaman I Damajadasri I Jivadaman; Rudrasimha I Isvaradatta; Rudrasimha I Jivadaman; Rudrasena I	Bagamira; Arjuna; Hvaramira; Mirahvara	Huvishka (c. 151 – c. 190); Vasudeva I (c. 190 – 230)						
230–250 CE	Samghadaman; Damasena; Damajadasri II; Viradaman; Yasodaman I Vijayasena; Damajadasri III; Rudrasena II; Visvasimha	Miratakhma; Kozana; Bhimarjuna; Koziya; Datarvharna; Datarvharna	KUSHANO-SASANIANS; Ardashir I (c. 230 – 250); Ardashir II (?-245)	Kanishka II (c. 230 – 247)					
250–280	Samghadaman; Damasena; Damajadasri II; Viradaman; Yasodaman I Vijayasena; Damajadasri III; Rudrasena II; Visvasimha	Miratakhma; Kozana; Bhimarjuna; Koziya; Datarvharna; Datarvharna	Peroz I, "Kushanshah" (c. 250 – 265); Hormizd I, "Kushanshah" (c. 265 – 295)			Vāsishka (c. 247 – 267); Kanishka III (c. 267 – 270)			
280–300	Bhratadarman	Datayola II	Hormizd II, "Kushanshah" (c. 295 – 300)			Vasudeva II (c. 267 – 300)		GUPTA EMPIRE; Chandragupta I Samudragupta; Chandragupta II	
300–320 CE	Visvasena; Rudrasimha II; Jivadaman		Peroz II, "Kushanshah" (c. 300 – 325)			Mahi (c. 300–305); Shaka (c. 305 – 335)		GUPTA EMPIRE; Chandragupta I Samudragupta; Chandragupta II	
320–388 CE	Yasodaman II; Rudradaman II; Rudrasena III; Simhasena; Rudrasena IV		Varahran I (325–350); Shapur II Sassanid king and "Kushanshah" (c. 350)			Kipunada (c. 335 – 350)		GUPTA EMPIRE; Chandragupta I Samudragupta; Chandragupta II	
388–396 CE	Rudrasimha III		KIDARITES invasion					GUPTA EMPIRE; Chandragupta I Samudragupta; Chandragupta II	

== Sources ==
- Dani, Ahmad Hasan; Litvinsky, Boris Abramovich; Zamir Safi, M. H. (1996). Eastern Kushans, Kidarines in Gandhara and Kashmir, and Later Hephthalites. pp. 163–184.
