= Gadahara =

Gaḍahara
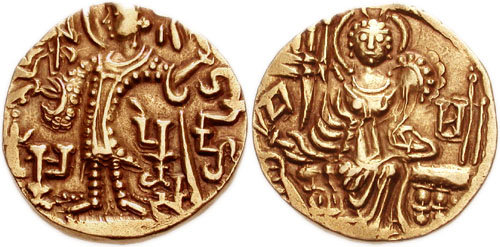
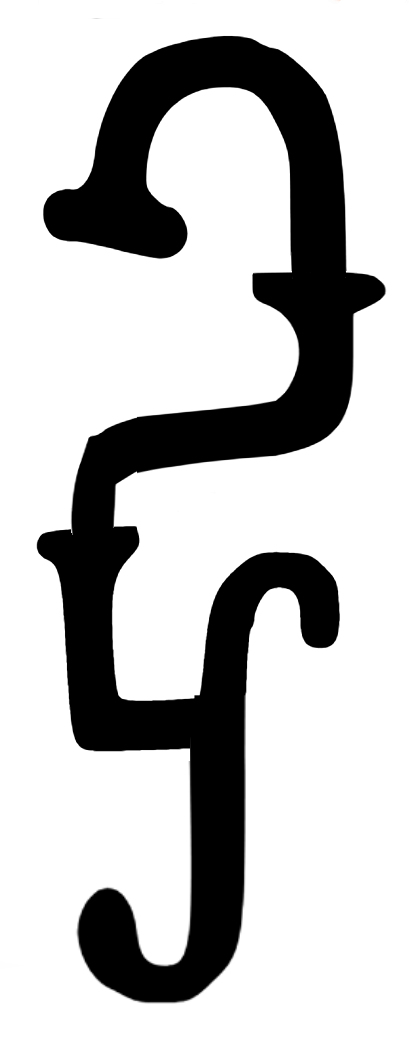
A "Gadahara" coin (left) and its Gadahara monogram (right).
Obverse: Several names appears on the obverse, vertically

Right field: The name Ga-ḍa-ha-ra appears vertically in the right field as a monogram.
Middle field: This issue has the name Pi-ro-ysa ( Pi-ro-ysa), thought to be Peroz III Kushanshah, under the arm of the standing ruler.

Left field: Ka-pa appears in the left field, meaning unknown, although this is rather often read Ku-shā-ṇa for Kushan.
Reverse: Goddess Ardoxsho seated. Minted circa 350-375 CE.

Gadahara (Brahmi: Ga-ḍa-ha-ra), sometimes Gadakhara (Brahmi: Ga-ḍa-kha-ra), is a name appearing on numerous coins at the end of the Kushan Empire or the beginning of the rule of the Kidarite Huns in the area of Central and Western Punjab in India, in the period circa 350-375 CE.

The name Ga-ḍa-ha-ra appears vertically as a monogram in the right field of the coins. Then several name appear under the arm of the ruler, including Yasada, Piroz, Kirada and Samudragupta.

It is not known with certainty whether Gadahara is actually the name of a ruler, or a clan, or a geographical region, although modern scholarship considers it is indeed the region of Gandhara.

The appearance of the names of foreign rulers such as the Kushano-Sassanian Piroz ( Pi-ro-ysa) or the Samudra, Some historians speculated it to Samudragupta ( Samudra) may suggest some kind of suzerainty at a time when the remnants of Kushan power were torn between these two powers.Although there may not have been any suzerainty, the Samudragupta's coin was minted by the ruler of the Kushan Principality of Punjab. After conquering them, the Kidarites adopted the same coinage and minted the same coins as those of Kushans of Punjab and Kushano Sassanids.

The Gadahara coins may be the last of the Kushan coins before the invasion of the Kidarites. But it is often thought that these coin actually were issued by the Kidarites themselves, who were invading the Kushan realm around that time, although they seem to come chronologically just before the issues of the famous Kidarite ruler Kidara.

== Other coin issues of Gadahara ==
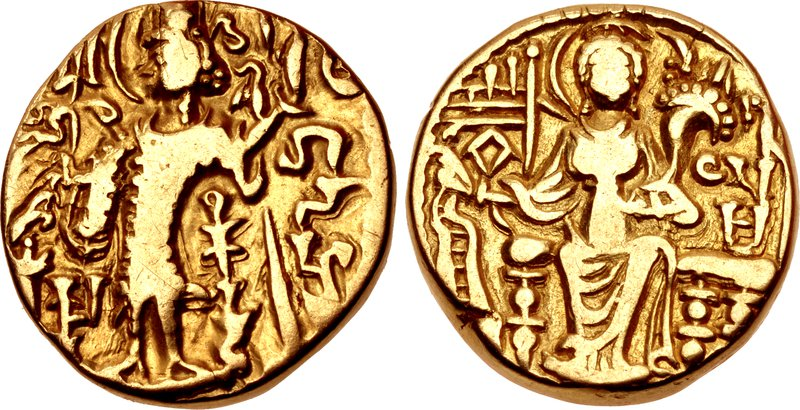
Another "Gadahara" coin, with the name "Kirada" as a vertical monogram under the arm of the King.

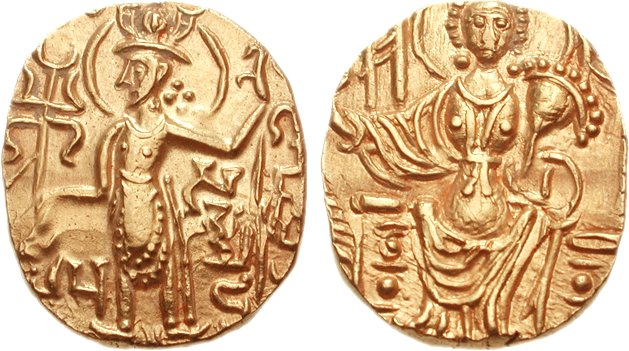
"Gadakhara" coin with the name of the Samudra (Ocean) ( Samudra) under the arm of the king. Circa 350-375 CE.
