= Kirada =

- King of the Kidarites
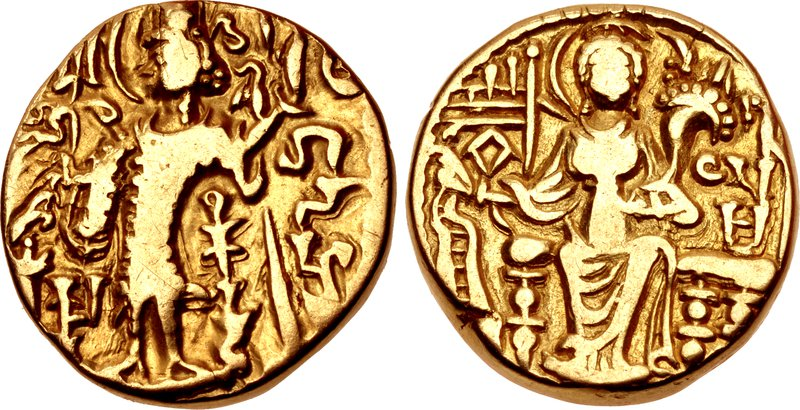
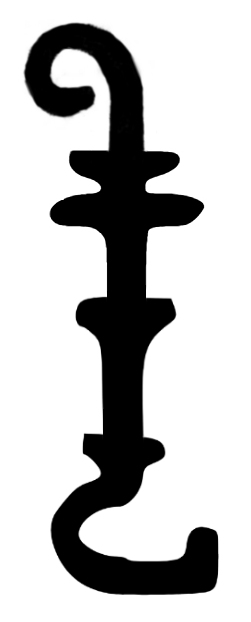
- A "Gadahara" (Gandhara) coin of Kirada (left) and its Kirada monogram (right) appearing under the arm of the ruler. Obverse: Several names appears on the obverse, vertically Right field: The name Ga-ḍa-ha-ra appears vertically in the right field as a monogram. Middle field: This issue has the name Kirada ( Ki-ra-da), vertically as a monogram under the arm of the standing ruler. Left field: Ka-pa-ṇa appears in the left field, meaning unknown. Reverse: Goddess Ardoxsho seated.

Kidarites
- Reign: 335-345 CE
- Predecessor: Kipunada
- Successor: Peroz

Kirada (Brahmi: Ki-ra-da, ruled 335-345 CE), is considered by modern scholarship as the first known ruler of the Kidarite Huns in the area of Gandhara in northwestern India, possibly at the same time as another Kidarite ruler named Yosada.

The name of Kirada name appears on numerous coins at the end of the Kushan Empire and the beginning of the rule of the Kidarite Huns in the area of Central and Western Punjab in India, in the period circa 340-345 CE.

The name Ga-ḍa-ha-ra (for the region of Gandhara) appears vertically as a monogram in the right field of the coins of Kirada, as on some slightly earlier coins signed Samudragupta, or subsequent coins of other early Kidarite rulers named Yasada, Peroz and Kidara. The appearance of the name Samudragupta may suggest some kind of suzerainty at a time in relation with the Gupta Empire.

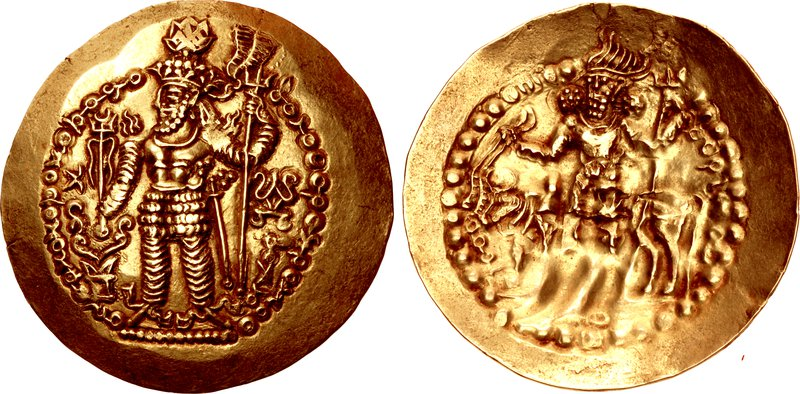
Coin in the name of Kushano-Sasanian ruler Varahran I, struck under Kidarite kings Yasada and Kirada, circa CE 340-345. Kidarite tamga to the right. Balkh mint.

The coins of Kirada would have followed those in the name of Samudragupta in Gandhara, and it is thought that Kirada was succeeded as Kidarite ruler by another Kidarite Peroz and then the famous Kidara. Altogether they form the first coin issues after the reign of the last Kushan ruler Kipunada.

Kirada also struck in Balkh coins in the name of the last Kushano-Sasanian ruler Varahran I Kushanshah circa CE 340-345, incorporating the Kidarite tamga which replaced the nandipada which had been in use before the rise of the Kidarites.

Preceded by Varahran I (Kushano-Sasanians); Kipunada (Kushan Empire)	Kidarite ruler 335-345 CE	Succeeded by Peroz
