= Sasanian–Kidarite wars =

Sasanian - Kidarite Wars
| Date | 350 C.E – 466 C.E |
| Location | Bactria, Central Asia |
| Result | Sasanian victory |
| Territorial changes | Second conflict: Huns defeated the Sassanids and occupied Bactria.; Fourth conflict: alliance between the alchons and Sassanids push the Kidarite power out of Bactria |

Belligerents
| Sasanian Empire Alchon Huns Hepthalites Gupta Empire | Kidarites |

Commanders and leaders
| Shapur II; Bahram IV; Yazdgard II; Peroz; Mehama; Skandagupta | Grumbates; Kidara; Varhan |

The Sasanian-Kidarite Wars were a series of military confrontations between the Sassanid Empire and the Kidarites.

== First Sassanid-Kidarite Conflict ==
Around 350 C.E, the emperor of the Sassanids had to abandon his military expedition to the city of Nisibis because of the arrival of various central Asian nomadic tribes on their east and had struggles against them. During this period, the Xionite/Huna tribes who are likely to be the Kidarites, appeared as a threat to the Sassanids and even to the Guptas. After a long struggle, the Kidarites were forced to align with the Sassanids against the Romans.They agreed to enlist their light cavalry into the Persian army for accompanying Shapur II. The presence of the Kidarites in the Persian Campaign of the Western Caspian areas has been described by the Contemporary Eyewitness Ammianus Marcellinus. The presence of Grumbates is also observed at the Siege of Amida in 359, in which Grumbates lost his son.

== Second Sassanian-Kidarite Conflict ==
The alliance between the Sassanid Empire and the Kidarites strained and during the reign of Bahram IV, the Sasanians suffered numerous defeats against the Kidarites which allowed the Kidarites to settle in Bactria by replacing the Kushano-Sasanian Kingdom. The Kidarite King Kidara proclaimed himself as the "Kidara King of the Kushans" on his coins as because the area was similar as of the western Kushans or Kushanshahr. According to Priscus, the Sasanians were forced to pay tributes to the Kidarites until the reign of Yazdgird II who had refrained from paying further tributes.

== Third Sasanian-Kidarite Conflict ==
As Yazdgird II refused to pay tribute, this became a reason for the Kidarites to invade the Sasanian dominions and therefore during the reign of Peroz I the Kidarites invaded the Sassanian domains. Yazdgird II spent most of his life waging inconclusive military expeditions against the Kidarites but his last conflict on the seventeenth year of his reign, suffered fatality according to two Armenian historians and ended up as a tributary to the Kidarites.Peroz I lacked in manpower and hence asked the Byzantines for financial aid which was refused.Peroz I then sought peace and offered marriage his sister in marriage to the Kidarites but instead sent a woman of lower status, after a while when the Kidarites came to know about the fact, they in turn wanted to do the same to the Sassanids by asking for military experts in the hunnic army from Persia.

== Fourth Sasanian-Kidarite Conflict ==
As soon as the 300 military experts arrived at the Kidarite court, they were either disfigured or killed and were sent back to Persia along with the information that the reason of the act was nothing except for the fake promise of Peroz I. During this period Peroz I allied himself with Mehama who was either an Alchon Hunnic ruler of eastern Bactria, together they put an end to the Kidarite power by 466 and the Sassanids took control of Bactria and Peroz I issued his coins at Balkh which were based on the Kidarite coins. The victory against the Kidarites were announced by the Sasanian embassy in Constantinople.

== See also ==
- Kidarite Kingdom
- Sasanian Empire
