= Hepthalite–Kidarite Wars =

Hepthalite - Kidarite Wars
Location	Sogdia, Central Asia, Bactria
Result	Hepthalite victory
Territorial changes	Sogdia occupied by Hepthalites

Belligerents
Hepthalites; Supported by: Sasanian Empire	Kidarites

Commanders and leaders
Unknown	Unknown

The Hepthalite - Kidarite Wars refers to multiple military confrontations between the Kidarites and the Hepthalites which ultimately resulted in the decline of the Kidarite power in Central Asia.

== Military conflicts ==
=== Hepthalite expansion to Tukharistan ===
The Hepthalite expansion to Tukharistan caused the splitting up of Kidarites into two groups, one in Sogdia and second one in the south.

=== Hepthalite invasion of Sogdia ===
The Hepthalites gradually invaded and destroyed the Kidarite power in Sogdia, conquering this area.

=== Hepthalite - Kidarite War of 467 ===
The Sassanian emperor Peroz lacked enough manpower to launch a full scale war against the Kidarites. Therefore, he sought peace with the Kidarites and offered them his sister in marriage but instead sent an imposter. The Sasanians allied with the Hepthalites in order to align against the Hepthalites and eventually the Hepthalite - Kidarite War of 467 turned out to be the demise of the Kidarites.

== Aftermath ==
The Kidarites suffering defeats against the Hepthalites and Sassanids pushed them out of Central asia and Bactria, which would eventually lead them to Gandhara and would come in conflict with the Guptas.
