= Peroz (Kidarite) =

Ruler

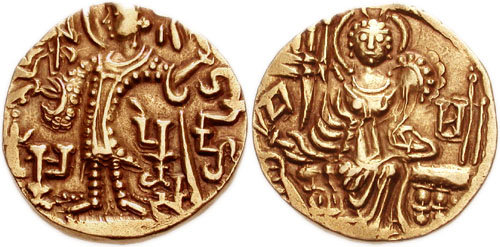
- The name "Peroz" (Pi-ro-ysa) appears on the coins of "Gadahara" (for the region of Gandhara), thought to belong to the Kidarite Huns. On the obverse, vertically: Right field: The name Ga-da-ha-ra appears in the right field. Middle field: This issue has the name Piroysa ( Pi-ro-ysa), thought to be Peroz, under the arm of the standing ruler. Left field: appears in the left field, meaning unknown, although this is also often read Ku-shā-ṇa for Kushan. Circa 350-375 CE

Kidarites
- Reign: c. 350–360 CE
- Predecessor: Kirada
- Successor: Kidara
- Religion: Zoroastrianism

Peroz (Middle Persian: 𐭯𐭩𐭫𐭥𐭰, Gupta script: Pi-ruz "The victorious", ruled circa 350-360 CE), was according to modern scholarship an early Kidarite ruler in Gandhara, right after the end of Kushano-Sasanians.

== Rule ==
The rule of the Kushano-Sasanians ended in the mid-4th century CE, when they lost their territories to the invading Kidarites Huns.

Peroz was a successor of the first Kidarite ruler Kirada, and the immediate predecessor of the famous Kidarite ruler Kidara. He was previously thought to be one of the last of the Kushano-Sasanids Kushanshas rulers.

He minted his own coinage and used the title of Kushansha, ie "Kings of the Kushans".

=== Siege of Amida (359 CE) ===
Historian Khodadad Rezakhani suggests that Peroz was at the Siege of Amida in 359 CE, where a Kidarite army under Grumbates is known to have supported the Sasanian army of Shapur II in besieging the city held by the Romans. In his account of the siege, Ammianus Marcellinus describes in detail the costume, and in particular the headgear of one of the besieging rulers:

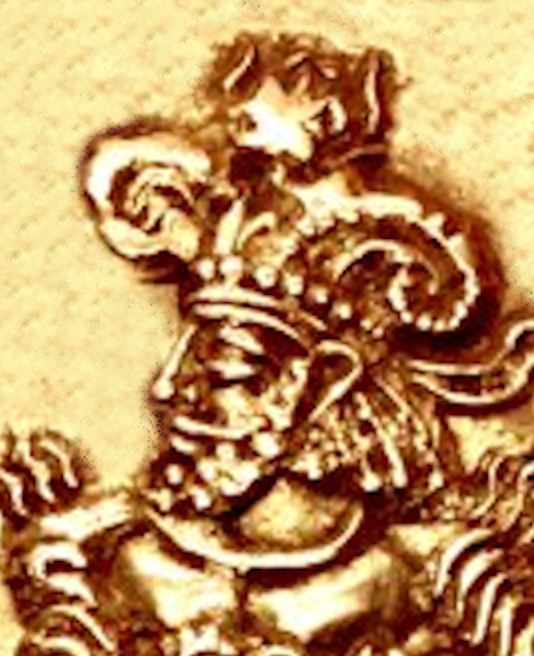
Peroz and his characteristic headgear with ram horns, may have been observed at the Siege of Amida by Ammianus Marcellinus in 359 CE.

The king himself, mounted upon a charger and overtopping the others, rode before the whole army, wearing in place of a diadem a golden image of a ram's head set with precious stones, distinguished too by a great retinue of men of the highest rank and of various nations.

— Ammianus, Roman Antiquities, 1935:471

This ruler is traditionally held to be Shapur II, although Ammanus Marcellinus doesn't expressly say so, and Shapur's traditional headgear, a crenellated crown, is very different. The headgear with ram's horn would rather correspond to that of Peroz as seen on many of his coins in the Sasanian style. Ammianus Marcellinus also mentions that the king, whom he assumes to be Shapur, was called "Saansaan" and "Pirosen" by the Persians, which could actually refer to "Šāhanšāh Pērōz", the ruler of the eastern Hunnic tribes (Chionites, Gelani, and Sagistani).

== Coinage in the style of the Kushano-Sasanians ==
Besides his coins in the Kushan style, Peroz issues silver and gold coinage in the Sasanian style, in which he often retains the name of Kushano-Sasanian ruler Varahran I, but in which Varahran is shown wearing a characteristic Sasanian headgear with the addition of two ram horns.

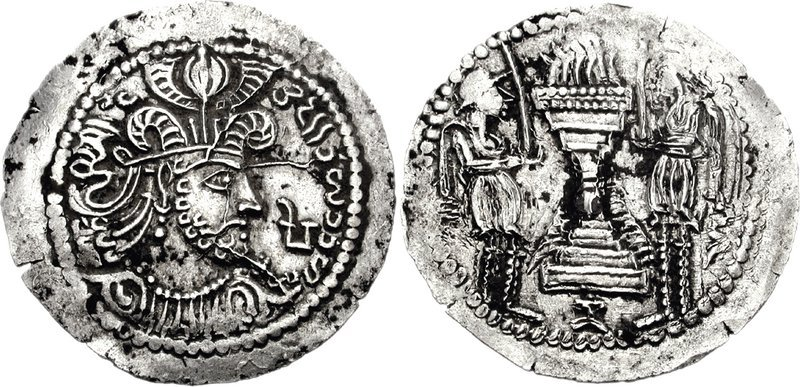
Coin of Peroz in the name of Varahran I. Obverse:' Crowned bust with Sasanian headgear and ram horns; Brahmi “Pi” to right/ Reverse: Fire altar with attendants and ribbons; Brahmi “Nam” in exergue.

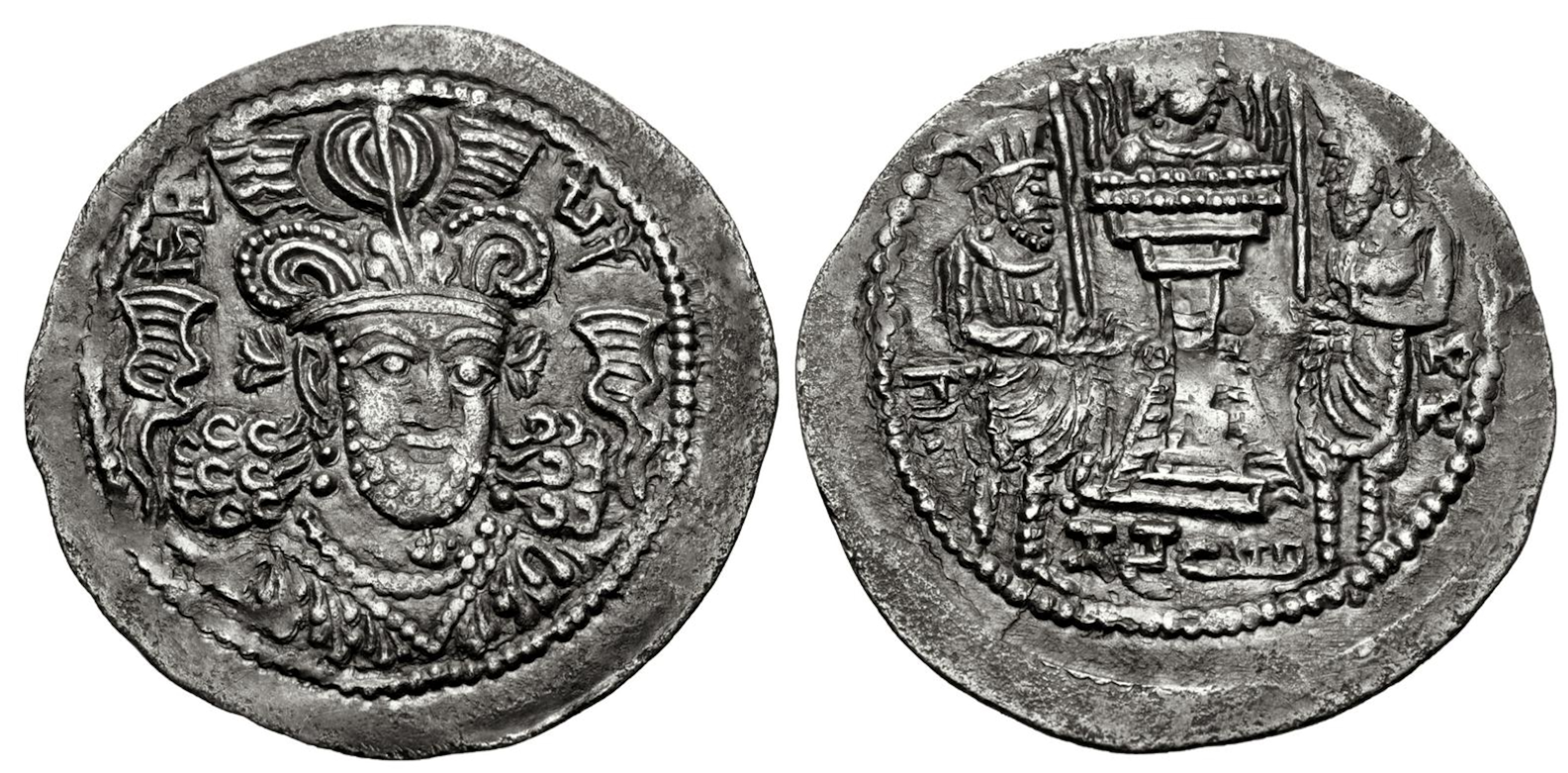
Coin of Peroz. Gandhara mint. Obverse: Bust facing, wearing crown with ram's horns surmounted by korymbos and ribbons. Brahmi legend Pi-ro./ Reverse: Fire altar flanked by two attendants.

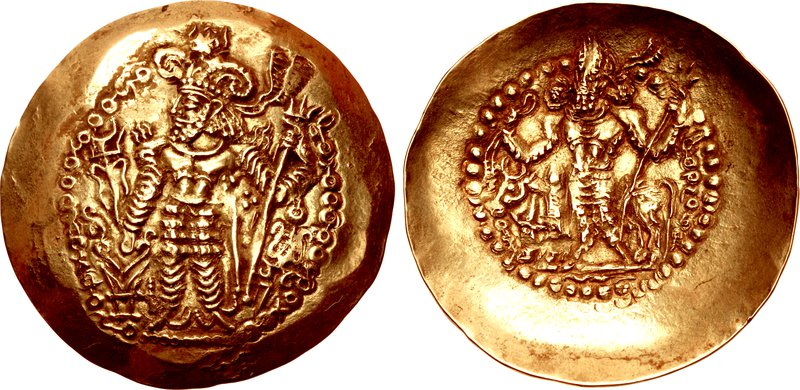
Coin in the name of the Kushano-Sasanian ruler Varahran I, struck under Peroz (ram horns added), circa AD 330 365 CE. Kidarite tamgha to right. Balkh mint.

== Sources ==
- Daryaee, Touraj; Rezakhani, Khodadad (2017). "The Sasanian Empire". In Daryaee, Touraj (ed.). King of the Seven Climes: A History of the Ancient Iranian World (3000 BCE - 651 CE). UCI Jordan Center for Persian Studies. pp. 1–236. ISBN 9780692864401.
- Kia, Mehrdad (2016). The Persian Empire: A Historical Encyclopedia [2 volumes]: A Historical Encyclopedia. ABC-CLIO. ISBN 978-1610693912.
- Rapp, Stephen H. (2014). The Sasanian World through Georgian Eyes: Caucasia and the Iranian Commonwealth in Late Antique Georgian Literature. Ashgate Publishing, Ltd. ISBN 978-1472425522.
- Payne, Richard (2016). "The Making of Turan: The Fall and Transformation of the Iranian East in Late Antiquity". Journal of Late Antiquity. 9. Johns Hopkins University Press: 4–41. doi:10.1353/jla.2016.0011. S2CID 156673274.
- Rezakhani, Khodadad (2017). "East Iran in Late Antiquity". ReOrienting the Sasanians: East Iran in Late Antiquity. Edinburgh University Press. pp. 1–256. ISBN 9781474400305. JSTOR 10.3366/j.ctt1g04zr8. (registration required)
- La Vaissière, Étienne de (2016). "Kushanshahs i. History". Encyclopaedia Iranica.

Preceded by Kirada	Kidarites; 350-360	Succeeded by Kidara
