= Paitava =

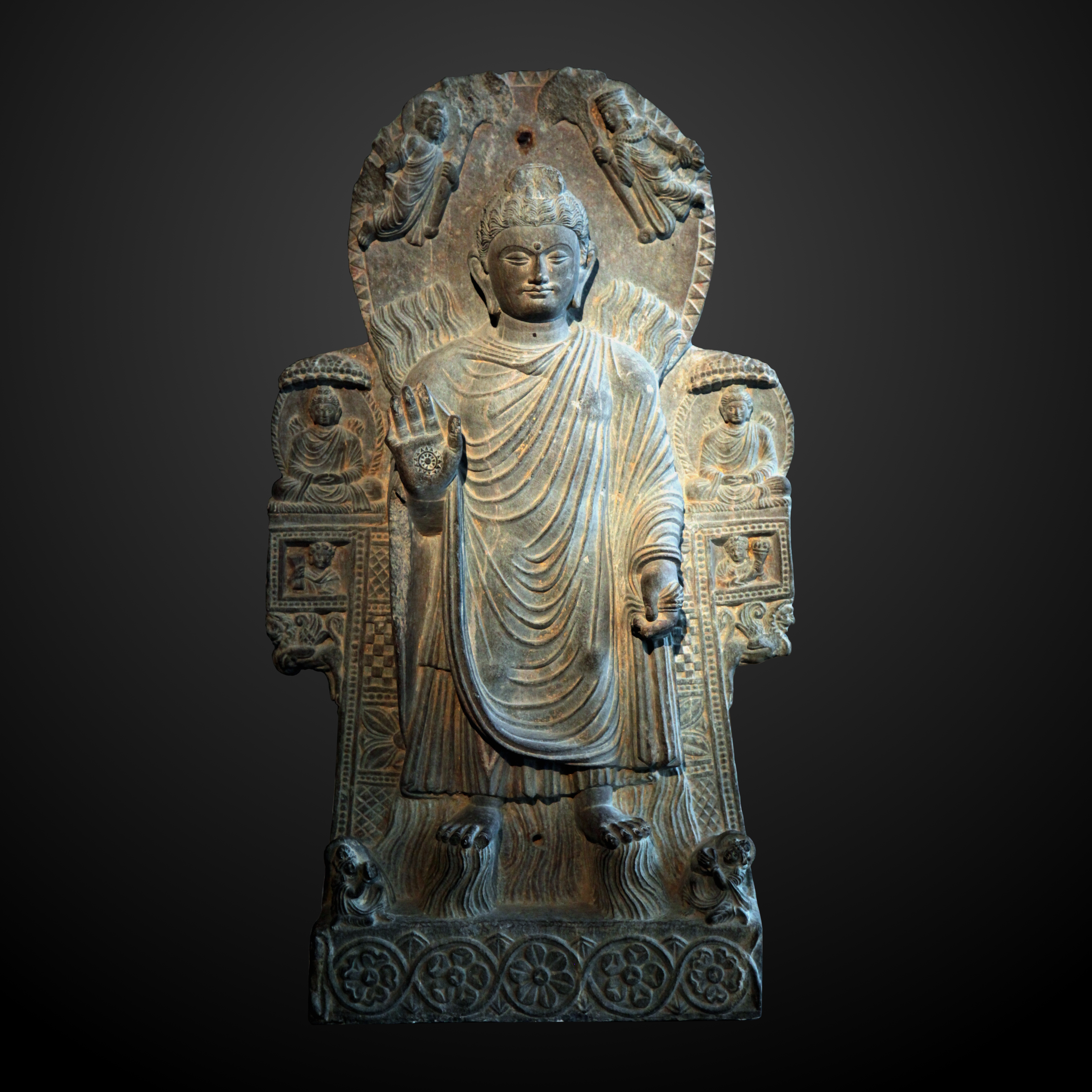
- The Twin Miracle of Water and Fire, found at Paitava monastery, 3rd century CE.

- Paitava Paitava (Afghanistan)
- Coordinates: 34.883333°N 69.200000°E
- Country: Afghanistan

Paitava was a Buddhist monastery located in modern Afghanistan. It was positioned together with Shotorak monastery around the city of Kapisa, 40 km north of Kabul, which was the northern capital of the Kushan Empire. Beautiful sculptures of Buddhist donors in Kushan dress are known from this site. Several Kushan coins were found in the monastery, suggested an early Kushan occupation, but some of the Buddhist works, such as The Twin Miracle of Water and Fire, may belong to the later period of the Kidarites (320–467 CE).

Paitava was also 7 km from Begram. The monastery was visited by the 7th century Chinese pilgrim Xuan Zang, who said it was near a large city named Si-pi-to-la-fasse, the largest city in the Kapisa region.

Paitava, with Shotorak, have an artistic usage of representing the Buddha with fire emanating from the shoulders in the miracle of Sravasti, a feature also found on the effigies of Kushan kings on their coinage.

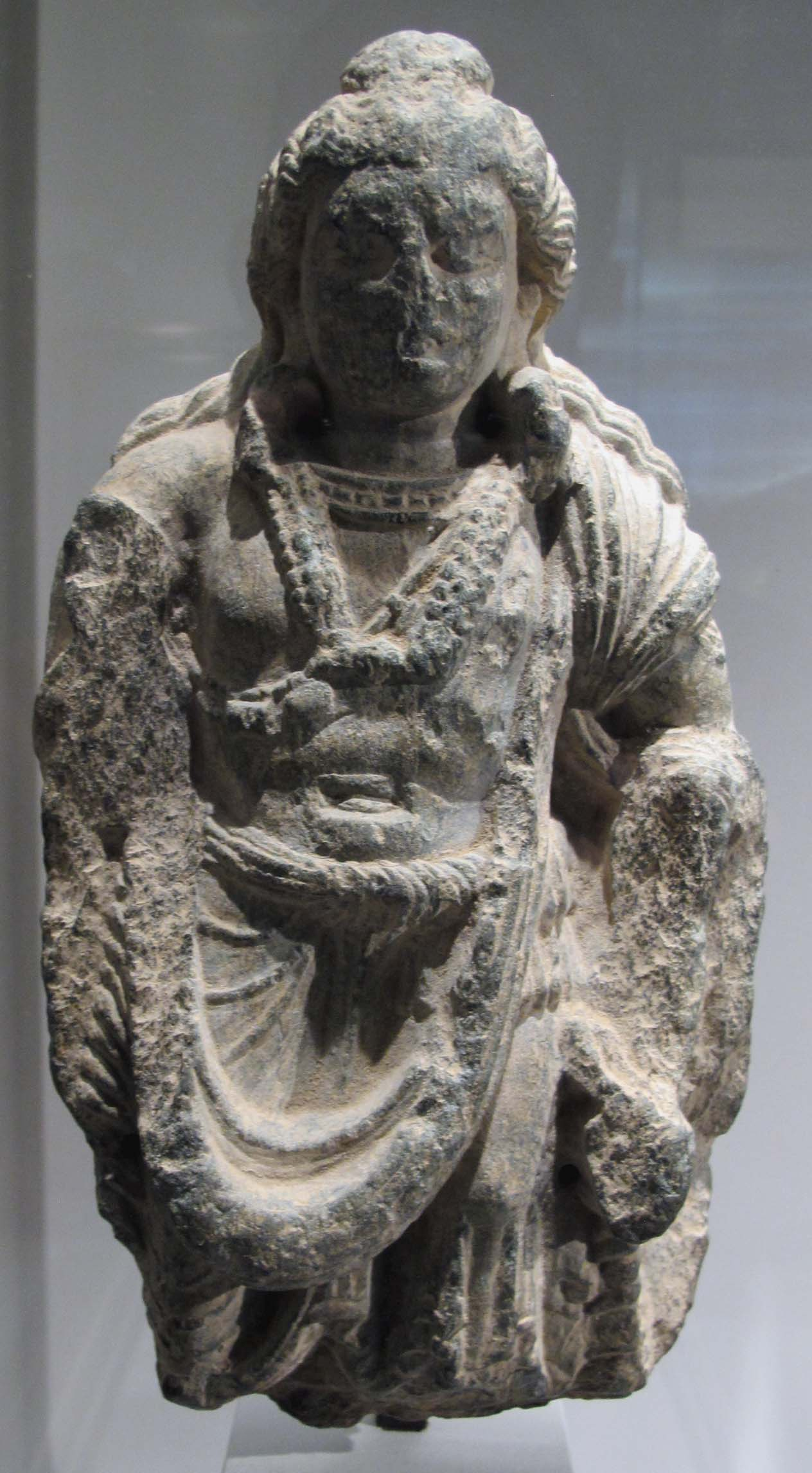
Bodhisattva.

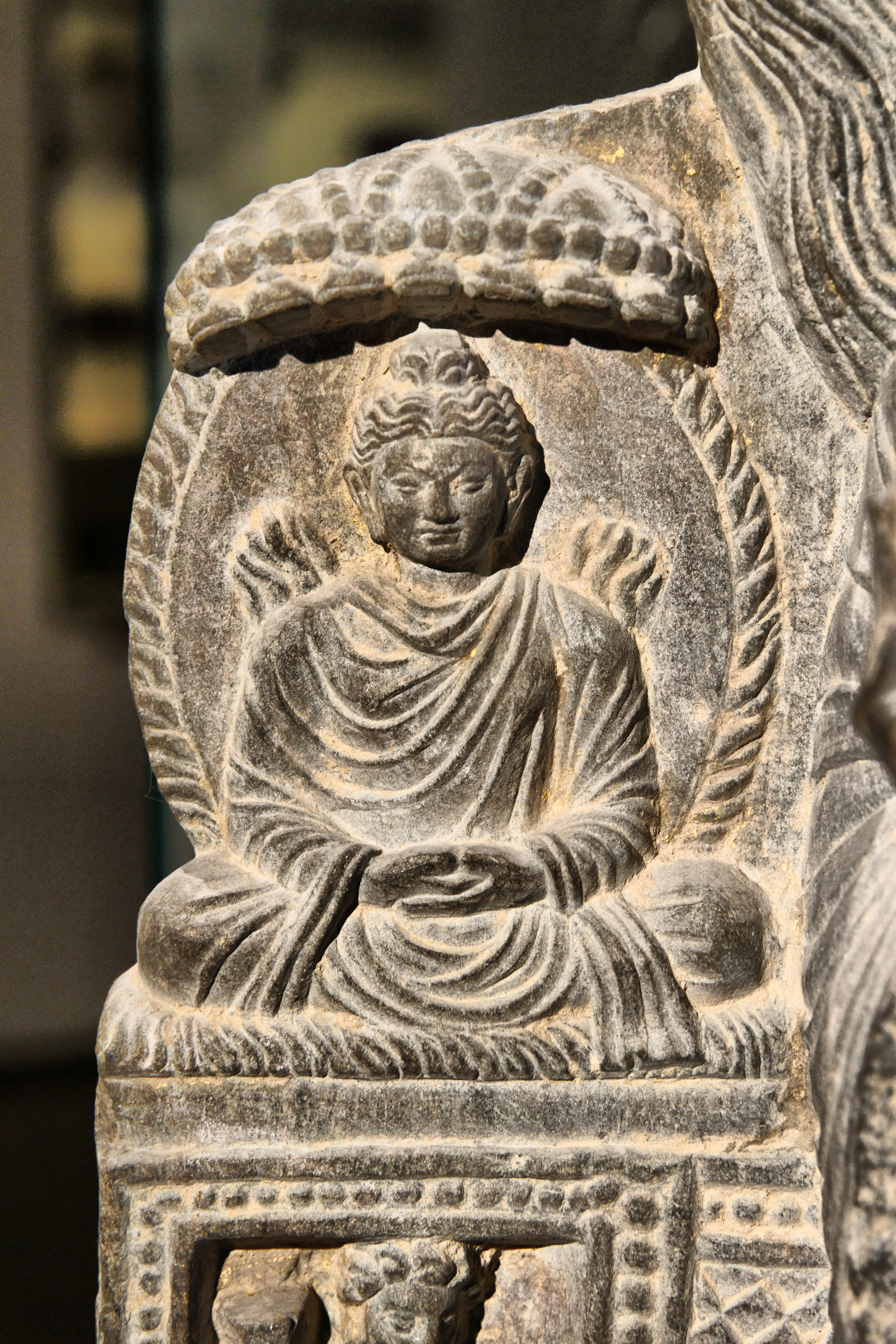
Miracle of Sravasti (detail)

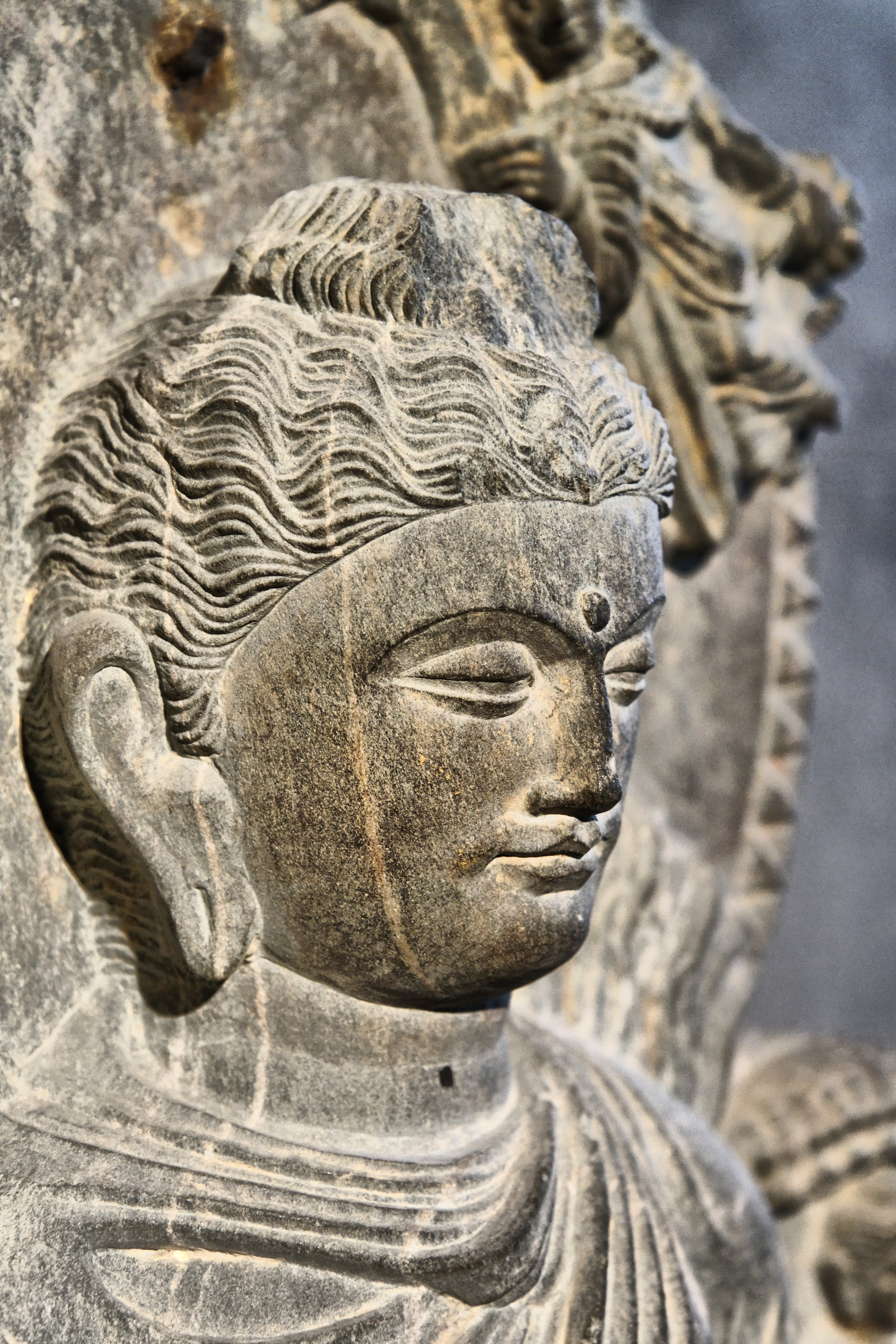
Miracle of Sravasti (detail)

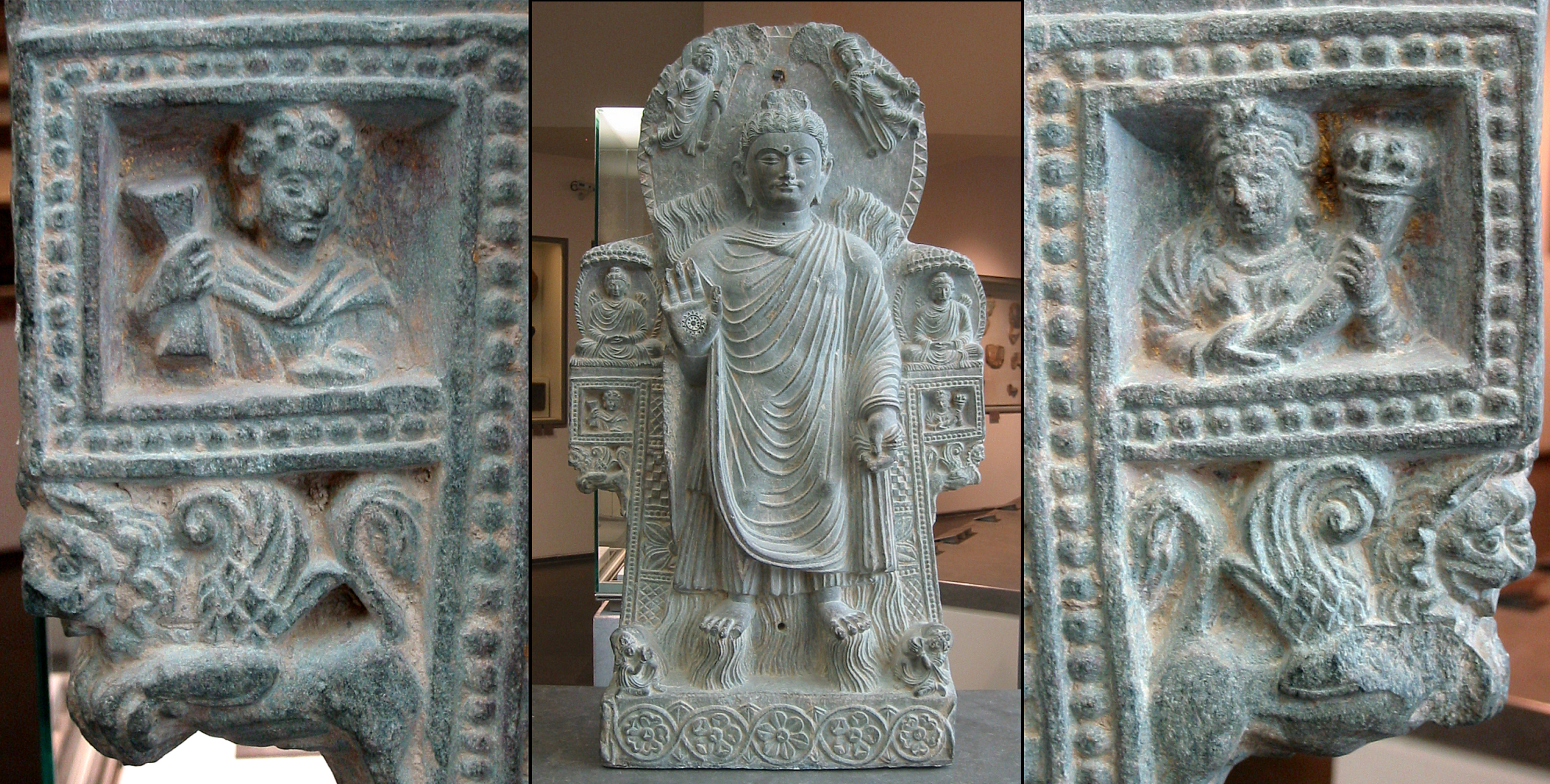
The Buddha with Heracles and Tychee (detail)

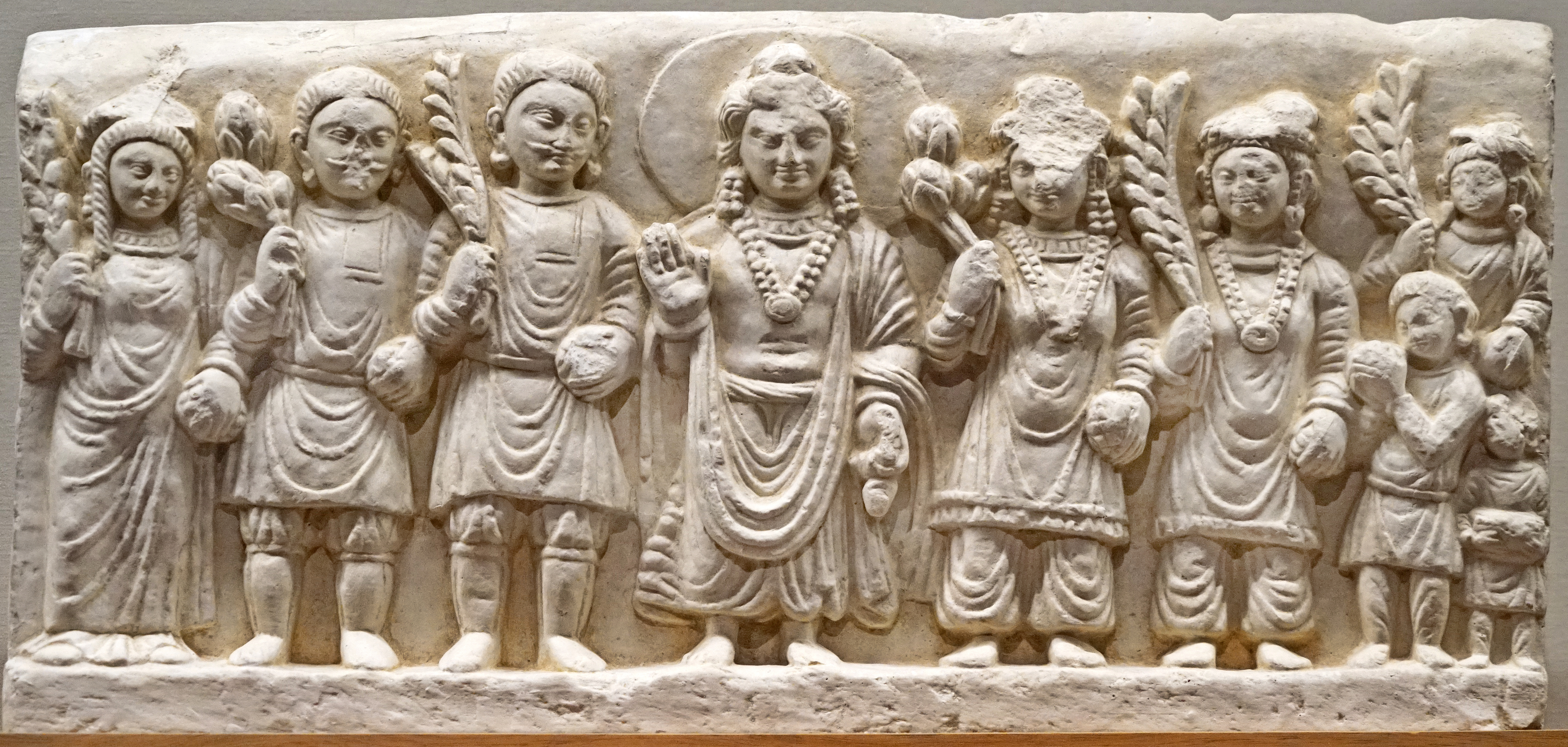
Kushan devotees around Maitreya, the Buddha of the future (center). Paitava. The sculptures of Paitava may alternatively belong to the later period of the Kidarites (320–467 CE).
