= Varahran Kushanshah =

Kushano-Sasanian Kingdom Kushanshah from 330 to 365

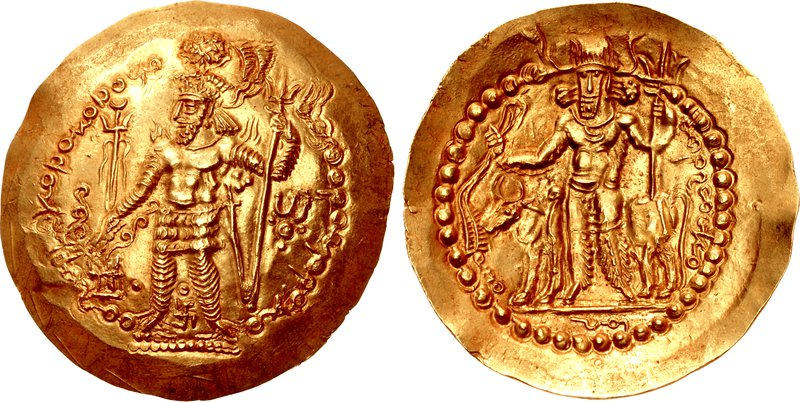
- Gold coin of Varahran Kushanshah in Kushan style, Balkh mint. The obverse still has the traditional Nandipada symbol, before the Kidarite tamgha was introduced.

Kushanshah of the Kushano-Sasanian Kingdom
- Reign: 330–365
- Predecessor: Peroz II Kushanshah
- Successor: Kidara I (Kidarites)
- Died: 365
- Religion: Zoroastrianism

Bahram Kushanshah (also spelled Varahran), was the last Kushanshah of the Kushano-Sasanian Kingdom from 330 to 365. He was the successor of Peroz II Kushanshah.

== Name ==
His theophoric name "Varahran" is the New Persian form of the Middle Persian Warahrān (also spelled Wahrām), which is derived from the Old Iranian Vṛθragna. The Avestan equivalent was Verethragna, the name of the old Iranian god of victory, whilst the Parthian version was *Warθagn. The name is transliterated in Greek as Baranes, whilst the Armenian transliteration is Vahagn/Vrām.

== Reign ==
Unlike his immediate predecessors, Varahran's domains only included Tukharistan, as both Gandhara and Kabul had been incorporated into the Sasanian Empire by the Sasanian King of Kings Shapur II (r. 309–379). Varahran did not issue coins in Gandhara, and his predecessor Peroz II is the last known Kushano-Sassanian ruler to do so. After that point Shapur II issued his own coinage from Kabul.

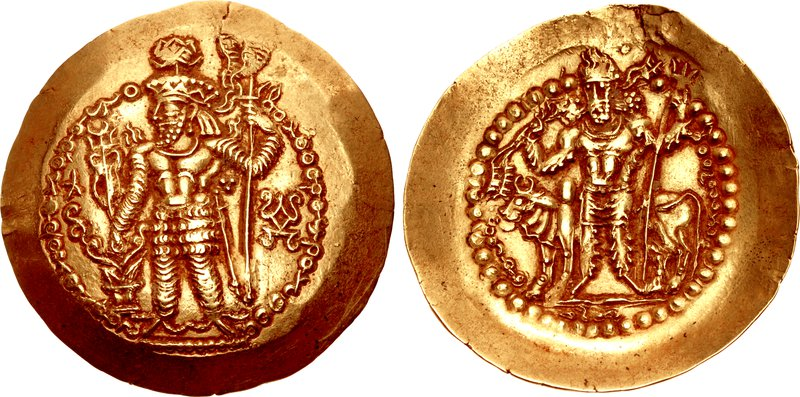
A coin with the effigy and in the name of Vahrām (Bahram), struck with the Kidarite tamga next to the king. Legend in Bactrian bogo oorhromoo ozorkokoshokoshoho. Balk mint, circa CE 330–365.

Varahran Kushanshah wears a distinctive crown on his coinage, which is flat-topped with a crown ball and florets, and pearls or lotus petals as a decoration on the sides. In the second phase of his reign, the coinage of Varahran minted in Balkh incorporated the Kidarite tamga replacing the nandipada which had been in use since Vasudeva I, suggesting that the Kidarites had now taken control, first under their ruler Kirada. Ram horns were added to the effigy of Varahran on his coinage for a brief period under the Kidarite ruler Peroz, and raised ribbons were added around the crown ball under the Kidarite ruler Kidara. In effect, Varahran has been described as a "puppet" of the Kidarites.

Traditionally, these variations in the coin types of Varahran, especially the modifications of the symbols and the figure of the ruler on the obverse while maintaining the regnal legend with the name "Varahran", were explained by supposing the existence of additional rulers named Varahran, such as a "Varahran II Kushanshah" or a "Varahran III Kushanshah". According to modern scholarship however, there was only one Varahran, whose coinage went under several phases under the authority of the Kidarite rulers Kirada, Peroz and Kidara.

By 365, the Kidarite ruler Kidara I was placing his name on the coinage of the region, and assumed the title of Kushanshah. In Gandhara too, the Kidarites minted silver coins in the name of Varahran, until Kidara also introduced his own name there.

== Sources ==
- Cribb, Joe (2018). Rienjang, Wannaporn; Stewart, Peter (eds.). Problems of Chronology in Gandhāran Art: Proceedings of the First International Workshop of the Gandhāra Connections Project, University of Oxford, 23rd-24th March, 2017. University of Oxford The Classical Art Research Centre Archaeopress. ISBN 978-1-78491-855-2.
- Cribb, Joe (2010). Alram, M. (ed.). "The Kidarites, the numismatic evidence.pdf". Coins, Art and Chronology Ii, Edited by M. Alram et al. Coins, Art and Chronology II: 91–146.
- Cribb, Joe; Donovan, Peter (2014). Kushan, Kushano-Sasanian, and Kidarite Coins A Catalogue of Coins From the American Numismatic Society by David Jongeward and Joe Cribb with Peter Donovan. p. 4.
- Cribb, Joe (1990). "Numismatic Evidence for Kushano-Sasanian Chronology". Studia Iranica. 19/2 (2). P. Geuthner: 151–193. doi:10.2143/SI.19.2.2014452. "The attribution of the Varahran coins between the first group and the Kidara coins has normally been explained by the creation of a Varahran (II) issuing the fourth group and (III) issuing the fifth group, with the first, second and third groups attributed to Varahran (I)."
- Daryaee, Touraj; Rezakhani, Khodadad (2017). "The Sasanian Empire". In Daryaee, Touraj (ed.). King of the Seven Climes: A History of the Ancient Iranian World (3000 BCE - 651 CE). UCI Jordan Center for Persian Studies. pp. 1–236. ISBN 978-0-692-86440-1.
- Multiple authors (1988). "Bahrām". Encyclopaedia Iranica, Vol. III, Fasc. 5. pp. 514–522.
- Rapp, Stephen H. (2014). The Sasanian World through Georgian Eyes: Caucasia and the Iranian Commonwealth in Late Antique Georgian Literature. London: Ashgate Publishing, Ltd. ISBN 978-1-4724-2552-2.
- Payne, Richard (2016). "The Making of Turan: The Fall and Transformation of the Iranian East in Late Antiquity". Journal of Late Antiquity. 9. Baltimore: Johns Hopkins University Press: 4–41. doi:10.1353/jla.2016.0011. S2CID 156673274.
- Rezakhani, Khodadad (2017). "East Iran in Late Antiquity". ReOrienting the Sasanians: East Iran in Late Antiquity. Edinburgh University Press. pp. 1–256. ISBN 978-1-4744-0030-5. JSTOR 10.3366/j.ctt1g04zr8. (registration required)
- Vaissière, Étienne de La (2016). "Kushanshahs i. History". Encyclopaedia Iranica.
- Wiesehöfer, Josef (2018). "Bahram I". In Nicholson, Oliver (ed.). The Oxford Dictionary of Late Antiquity. Oxford: Oxford University Press. ISBN 978-0-19-866277-8.

Preceded by Peroz II Kushanshah	Kushanshah of the Kushano-Sasanian Kingdom; 330–365	Succeeded by (Kidarite Huns); Kirada; Peroz; Kidara
