= Tobazini =

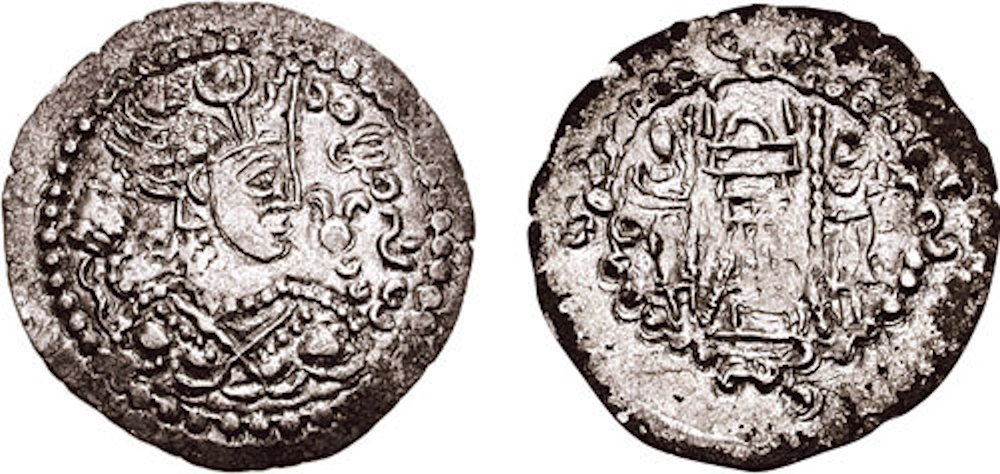
Coin of Tobazini/ Goboziko. Circa mid 5th century CE. Imitating Sasanian king Bahram IV. "Goboziko" in Bactrian script, crowned bust right, Tamgha before. Fire altar with attendants and ribbon; bust right in flames.

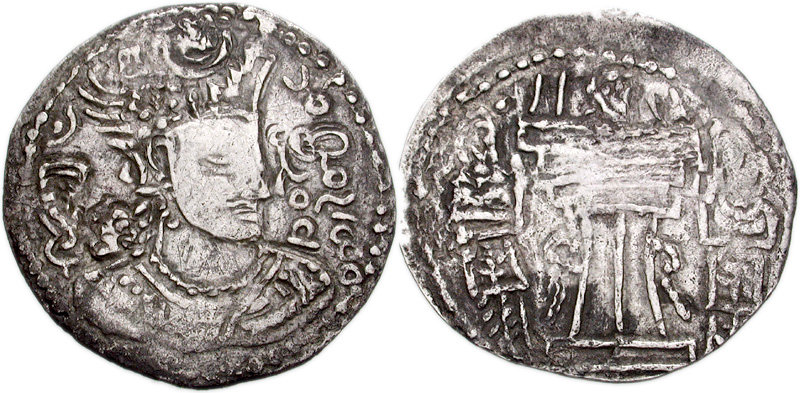
Coin of Tobazini/ Goboziko (facing). Imitating Sasanian king Bahram IV. Crowned bust right; tamgha before. Fire altar with attendants. Circa mid 5th century CE.

Tobazini, Gobazini or Goboziko was a ruler of southern Central Asia. He is only known from his coinage, found in Bactria and Northern Afghanistan. The legends on his coins are in Bactrian, but they are often difficult to read: a typical legend reads t/gobazini/o šauo "King Tobazini". Tobazini is often considered one of the last rulers of the Kidarites, circa 450 CE.

His coins often use a symbol (Tamgha S2:), which is known as one of the symbols of the Alchon Huns in Gandhara and Kabul (besides), but also the symbol of the Imperial Hephthalites, and is a possible indicator of the control of Samarkand, where it was used extensively in the local coinage. His coins copy the design of Sasanian king Bahram IV (388–399 CE).

After Tobazini, the Hephthalites adopted the coinage of Peroz I as their model for their own coinage in Bactria, without inscribing the name of their rulers, contrary to their predecessors the Kidarites and the Alchon Huns.
