= Korymbos =

Korymbos (κόρυμβος) is an Ancient Greek word for a cluster of flowers or fruit.

Korymbos may refer to:

- Corymb, a botanical term for a type of branched inflorescence
- Corymbus, Greek god of the fruit of the ivy
- Korymbos, a globe-like cloth used on the crowns of the Sasanian kings of Iran
