= Kidara I =

Kidara
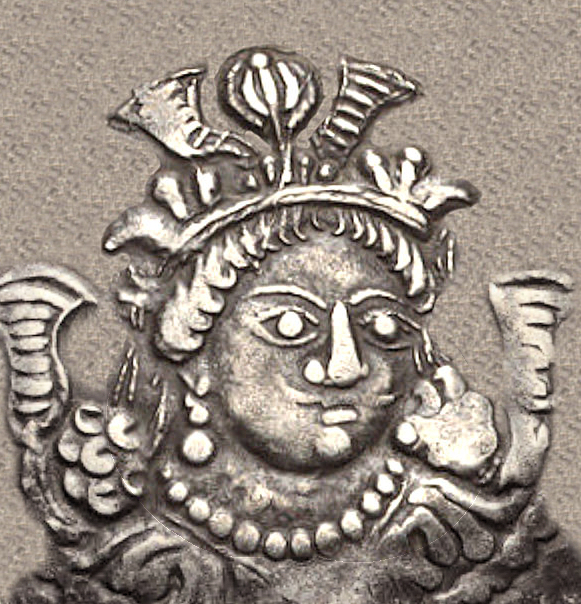
- Portrait of Kidarite king Kidara I, circa 350–386 CE. He wears his characteristic crown with ribbon flying upward. The use of the 3/4 portrait is sometimes attributed to the influence of the coinage of Byzantine ruler Arcadius (377–408 CE).

Kidarites
- Reign: c. 350–390 CE
- Predecessor: Peroz
- Successor: Uncertain

"Kushan" coins of Kidara

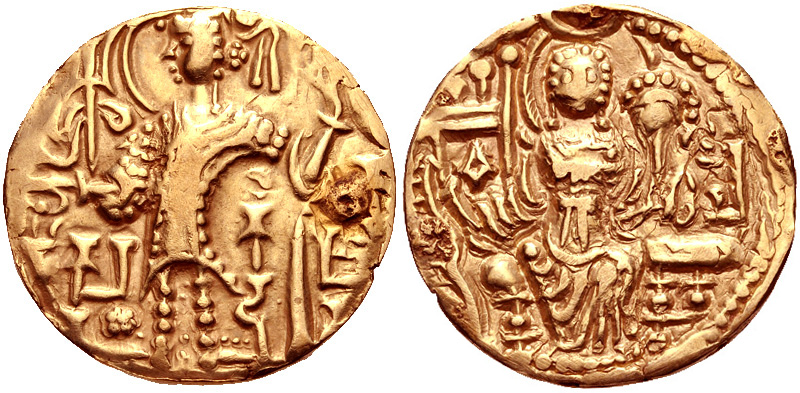
Kidara gold coin, circa 350–385 CE, derived from the Kushans. Vertical Brahmi legends from right to left:
Kushana ( Ku-shā-ṇa)
Kidara ( Ki-da-ra)
Kushana ( Ku-shā-ṇa)
Goddess Ardoxsho on the back.

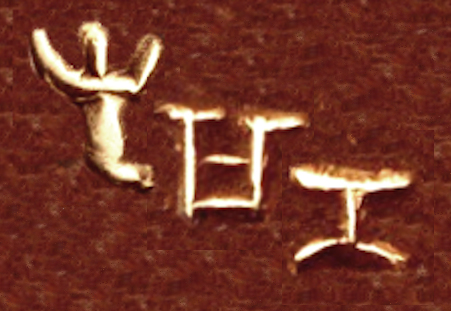
The word "Kushana" in Brahmi script ( Ku-shā-ṇa) as it appeared on the bottom left corner of Kidarite coins circa 350 CE.

Kidara I (Late Brahmi script: Ki-da-ra) fl. 350–390 CE) was the first major ruler of the Kidarite Kingdom, which replaced the Indo-Sasanians in northwestern India, in the areas of Kushanshahr, Gandhara, Kashmir and Punjab.

== Reign ==
Kidara himself was a nomadic ruler who invaded the areas of Tukharistan and Gandhara hitherto ruled by the Indo-Sasanians. It is thought the Kidarites had initially invaded Sogdiana and Bactria from the north circa 300 CE. His people may have been pushed out from the northern areas of Bactria by migrating Hephthalites.

Kidara's ethnicity is unclear, but he may himself have been a Chionite, and he belongs to the general category of the Huns or Huna. Already during the 4th century Sasanian Emperor Shapur II had fought against Chionite invaders led by king Grumbates, and ultimately passed an alliance with them, using their military in the campaign against the Romans in the siege of the fortress of Amida (now Diyarbakır, Turkey). Chinese sources explain however that the Kidarites are the Lesser Yuezhi, which would make them relatives of the Yuezhi, themselves ancestors of the Kushans. The most detailed account of Kidara’s reign is provided by the Chinese chronicle, the Pei shih [Annals of the Wei Dynasty].

Kidara having established himself in Tukharistan and Gandara, took the title of Kushanshah which until that time had been used by the rulers of the Indo-Sasanian kingdom. He thus founded the eponymous new dynasty of the Kidarites in northwestern India. The Kidarites also claimed to have been successors of the Kushans, possibly due to their ethnic proximity.

Kipunada lost his independence directly to the invading Hunas who had invaded northern India and acted as a local ruler of Taxila (alongside Mahi and Shaka) under the suzerainty of the Gupta emperors, while still using the coinage style of the Great Kushans. The Kushano-Sasanian sites, including the coins, extended to Gandhara due to Shapur II's protection of the eastern borders of his Sasanian Empire against the invading Huns/Chionites. His treaties with the Huns resulted in: allowing them to join the Sasanian troops, treating them as allies and allowing his direct control over the east. The Kushano-Sasanian coin series issued by Kidara and a certain Pērōz, in Tokharistan and Gandhara continued. Evidently, Kidara I was the Kushan king who submitted to the Gupta king Samudragupta and accepted Gupta suzerainty.

== Coinage ==
Kidara struck both Sasanian-style gold and silver coins (imitating his immediate predecessor in the region Varahran I) and Kushan-style gold coins, before issuing coins in his own name.

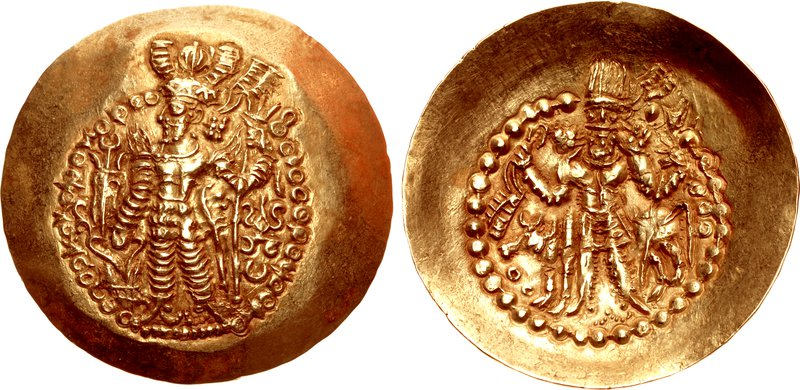
Coin in the name of Kushano-Sasanian Varahran I struck under Kidara circa CE 350-365. Crown with ribbon flying upward. Kidarite tamgha to the right. Balkh mint.

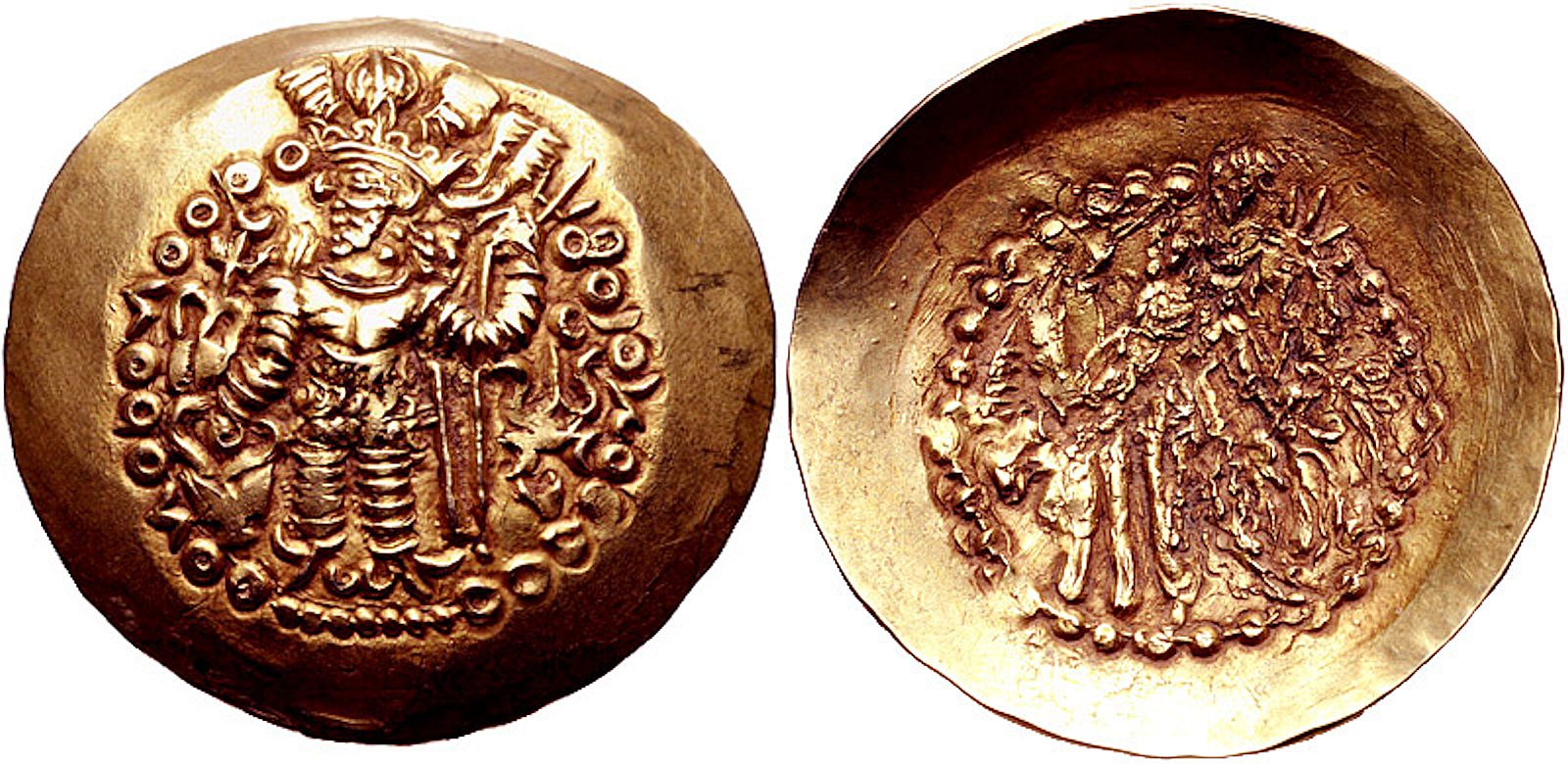
Coin in the name of Kidara, with legend "βαγο Κιδαρο οοζορκο κοþανοþαο" "Kidara, the great Kushanshah". Type 6A-D. Coin type found in Tepe Maranjan, dated to before 388 CE.

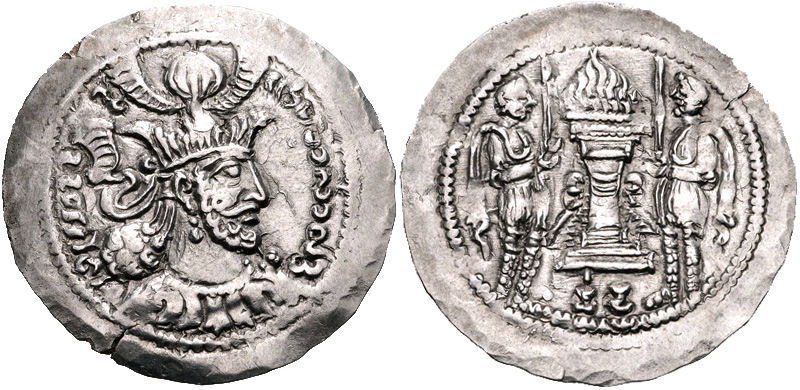
A coin of Kidara in the style of Indo-Sassanian ruler Bahram Kushanshah. Crown with ribbon flying upward. Gandhara mint.

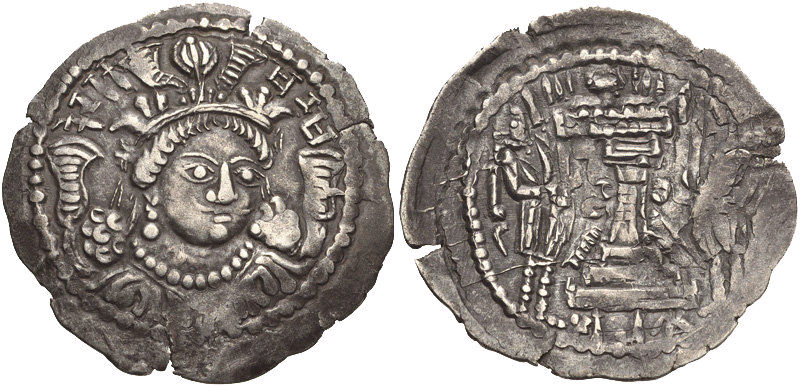
Kidara facing, with a legend in his own name. Brahmi legend: Ki-da-ra Ku-ṣa-ṇa-ṣa "Kidara the Kushana king".

== See also ==
- Kushano-Sassanians
- Sasanian coinage of Sindh

== Sources ==
- Dani, Ahmad Hasan; Litvinsky, Boris A.; Samghabadi, R. Shabani, eds. (1996). History of Civilizations of Central Asia. Vol. 3. Unesco. ISBN 92-3-103211-9.
  - Chegini, N. N.; Nikitin, A. V. "Sasanian Iran — economy, society, arts and crafts". In Dani, Litvinsky & Samghabadi (1996), pp. 35–78.
  - Dani, Ahmad Hasan; Litvinsky, B. A.; Zamir Safi, M. H. "Eastern Kushans, Kidarites in Gandhara and Kashmir, and Later Hephthalites". In Dani, Litvinsky & Samghabadi (1996), pp. 163–184.
  - Zeimal, E. V. "The Kitarite kingdom in Central Asia". In Dani, Litvinsky & Samghabadi (1996), pp. 119–134.

Preceded by Peroz	Kidarites; 350–385	Succeeded by Lesser Kidarites; Alchon Huns
