= Kidarites =

320–467 CE dynasty of nomads in Central and South Asia

- 320 CE–467 CE
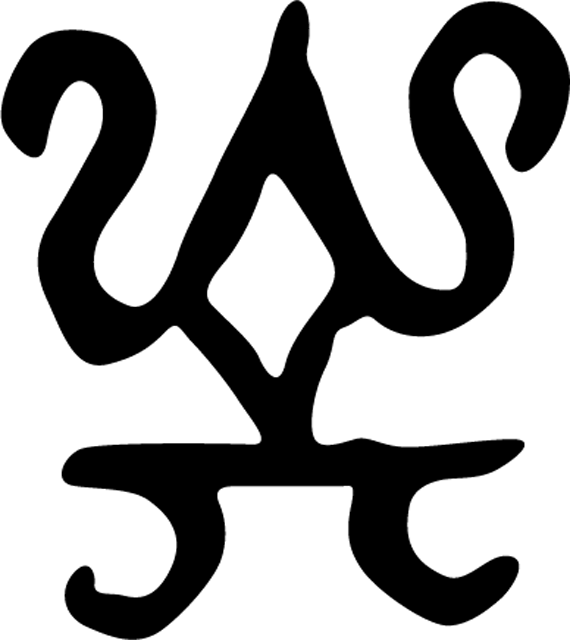
- Tamga of the Kidarites

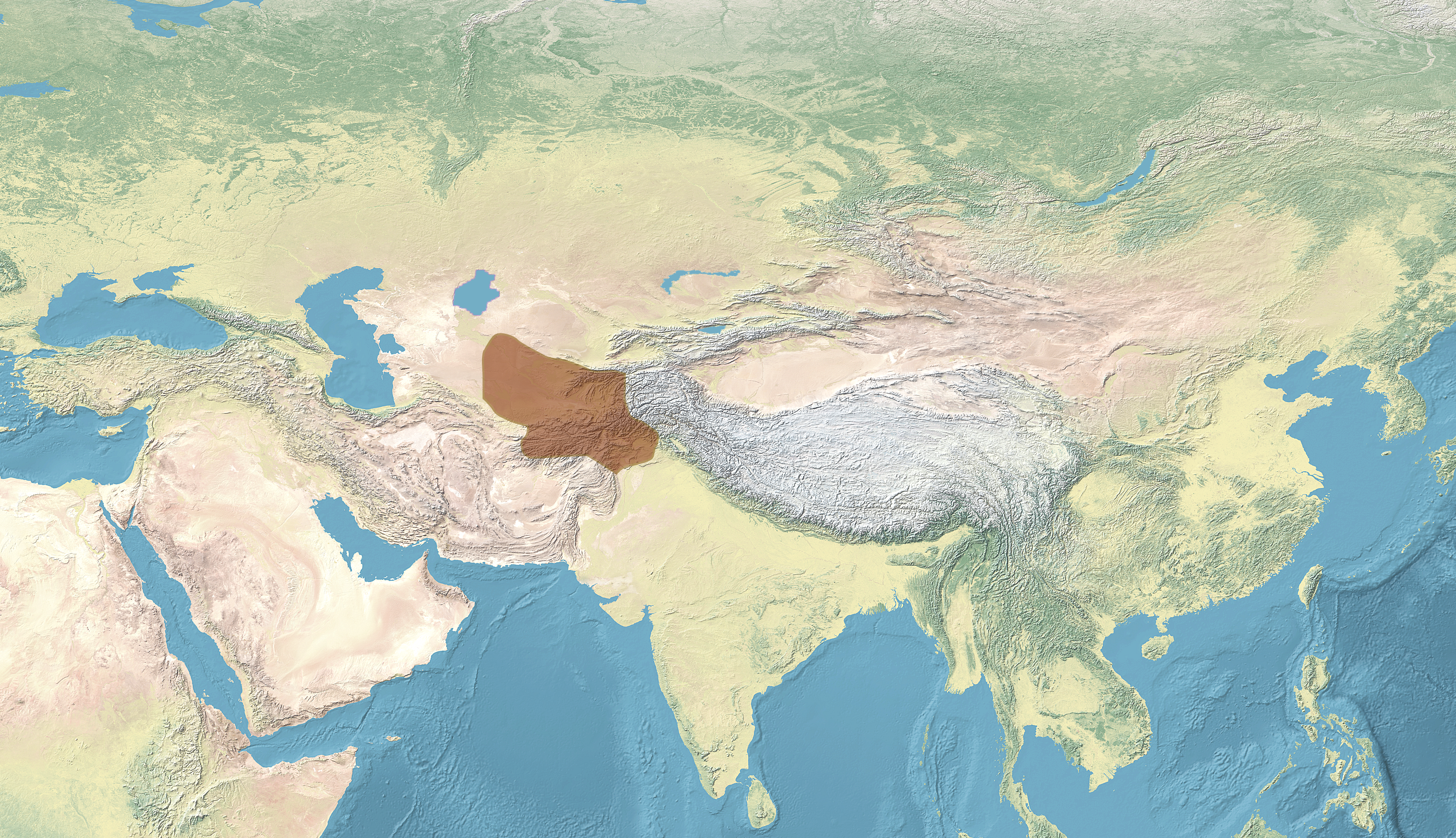
- Territory of the Kidarite kingdom, and main Asian polities c. 400

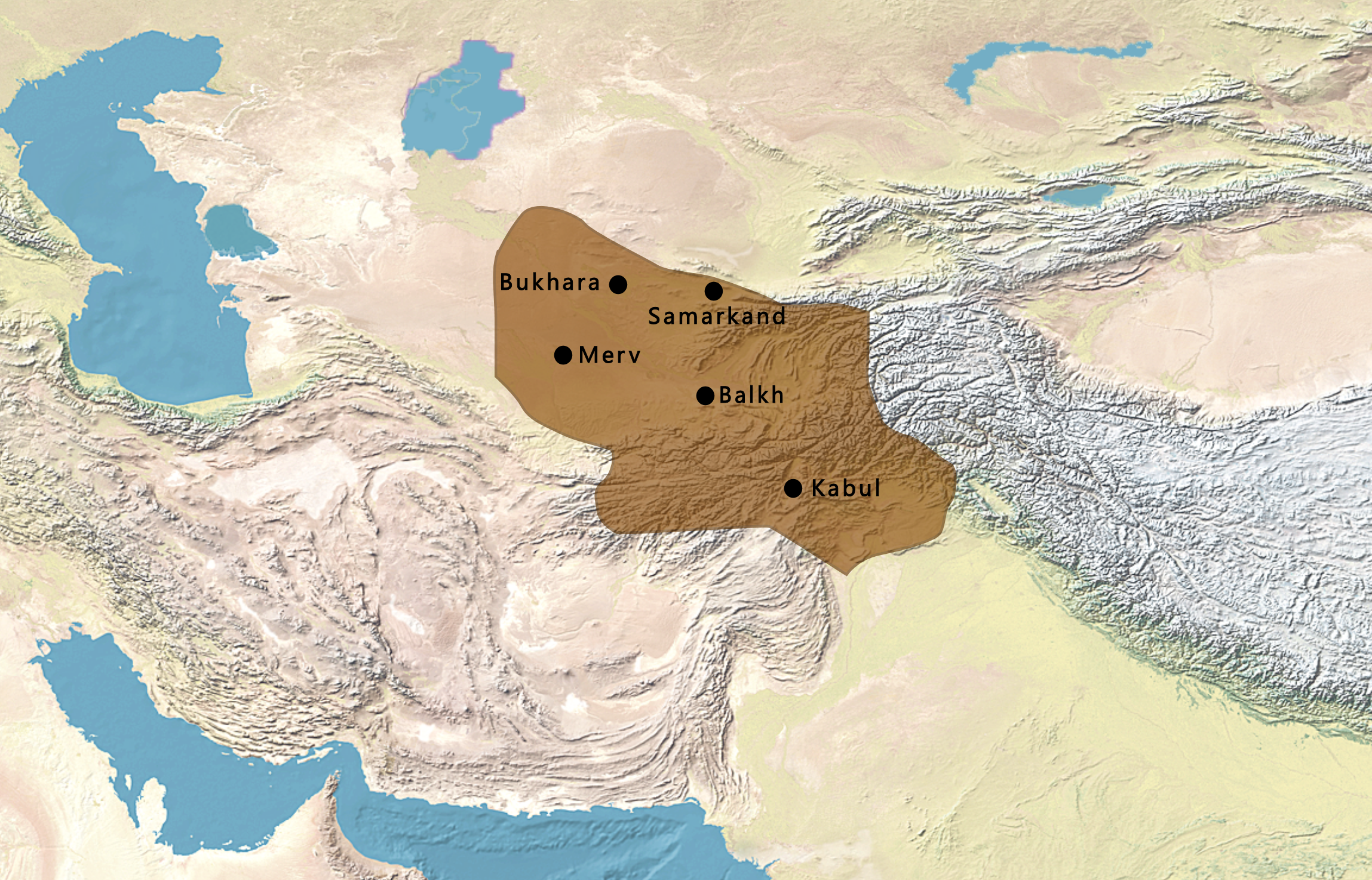
- Territory of the Kidarites, c. 400
- Capital: Bactria
- Common languages: Bactrian (written)
- Religion: Zoroastrianism; Animism; Buddhism
- Government: Monarchy
- Kushanshah
  - fl. 320: Kidara
  - fl. 425: Varhran I
  - fl. 500: Kandik
- Historical era: Late Antiquity
  - Established: 320 CE
  - Disestablished: 467 CE
Preceded by	Succeeded by
Kushano-Sasanian Kingdom; Kushan Empire	Alchon Huns; Hephthalites

The Kidarites, or Kidara Huns, were a dynasty that ruled Bactria and adjoining parts of Central Asia and Pakistan in the 4th and 5th centuries. The Kidarites belonged to a complex group of peoples known collectively in the Indus Valley as the Huna, and in Europe as the Chionites (from the Iranian names Xwn/Xyon), and may even be considered as identical to the Chionites. The 5th century Byzantine historian Priscus called them Kidarite Huns, or "Huns who are Kidarites". Chinese annals referred to them as the Ta Yüeh-chih, or Lesser Yüeh-chih. The Huna/Xionite tribes are often linked, albeit controversially, to the Huns who invaded Eastern Europe around the same period. They are entirely different from the Hephthalites, who replaced them about a century later.

The Kidarites were named after Kidara (Chinese: 寄多羅 Jiduoluo, MC: Kjie-ta-la) one of their main rulers. The Kidarites appear to have been a part of a Huna horde known in Latin sources as the "Kermichiones" (from the Iranian Karmir Xyon) or "Red Huna". The Kidarites established the first of four major Xionite/Huna states in Central Asia, followed by the Alchon, the Hephthalites and the Nezak.

In 360–370 CE, a Kidarite kingdom was established in Central Asian regions previously ruled by the Sasanian Empire, replacing the Kushano-Sasanians in Bactria. Thereafter, the Sasanian Empire was limited to Merv. Next, circa 390-410 CE, the Kidarites invaded northwestern India, where they replaced the remnants of the Kushan Empire in the area of Punjab.

== Origins ==
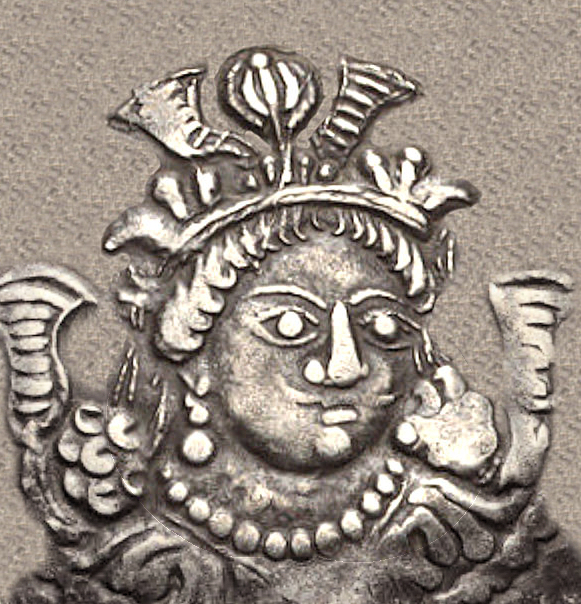
Portrait of Kidara, king of the Kidarites, circa 350–386. The coinage of the Kidarites imitated Sasanian imperial coinage, with the exception that they displayed clean-shaven faces, instead of the beards of the Sasanians, a feature relating them to Altaic rather than Iranian lineage.

A nomadic people, the Kidarites appear to have originated in the Altai Mountains region. The terms Huns/Chionites seem to reflect the general ethnic appellation of these people, whereas Kidarites should be understood as a dynastic designation derived from the name of their king, Kidara. On Kidarite coins their rulers are depicted as beardless or clean-shaven – a feature of Altaic cultures at the time (as opposed, for example, to the Iranian cultures of South Central Asia). They may have been Oghuric speakers originally, as may have been the Chionites and the Hephthalites, before adopting the Bactrian language. The Kidarites were depicted as mounted archers on the reverse of coins. They were also known to practice artificial cranial deformation.

The Kidarites appear to have been synonymous with the Karmir Xyon ("Red Xionites" or, more controversially, "Red Huns"), – a major subdivision of the Chionites (Xionites), alongside the Spet Xyon ("White Xionites"). In a recently discovered seal with the image of a ruler similar to those of the Kidarite coins, the ruler named himself in Bactrian "King of the Huns and Great Kushan Shah" (uonano shao o(a)zarko (k)oshanoshao). The discovery was reportedly made in Swat.

[[File: Attendabts at the sacred Zoroastrian fire altar wearing the kaftan and holding swords on the coinage of Kidara.jpg|thumb|upright|Fire attendants with the kaftan tunic worn over trousers tucked into knee-high boots, and holding swords, on the coinage of Kidara]] The name of their eponymous ruler Kidara (fl. 350–385) may be cognate with the Turkic word Kidirti meaning "west", suggesting that the Kidarites were originally the westernmost of the Xionites, and the first to migrate from Inner Asia. Chinese sources suggest that when the Uar (滑 Huá) were driven westward by the Later Zhao state, circa 320, from the area around Pingyang (平陽; modern Linfen, Shanxi), it put pressure on Xionite-affiliated peoples, such as the Kidarites, to migrate. Another theory is that climate change in the Altai during the 4th century caused various tribes to migrate westward and southward.

Contemporary Chinese and Roman sources suggest that, during the 4th century, the Kidarites began to encroach on the territory of Greater Khorasan and the Kushan Empire – migrating through Transoxiana into Bactria, where they were initially vassals of the Kushans and adopted many elements of Kushano-Bactrian culture. The Kidarites also initially put pressure on the Sasanian Empire, but later served as mercenaries in the Sassanian army, under which they fought the Romans in Mesopotamia, led by a chief named Grumbates (fl. 353–358 CE). Some of the Kidarites apparently became a ruling dynasty of the Kushan Empire, leading to the epithet "Little Kushans".

== Kidarite kingdom ==
=== First appearance in literary sources ===
Inclusion of the Kidarite tamgha
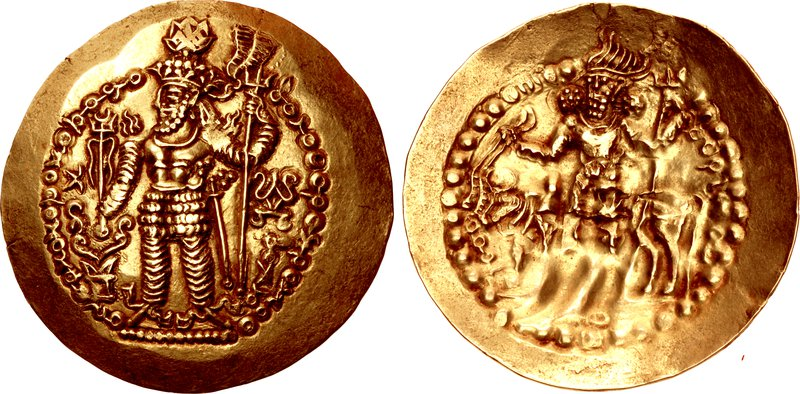
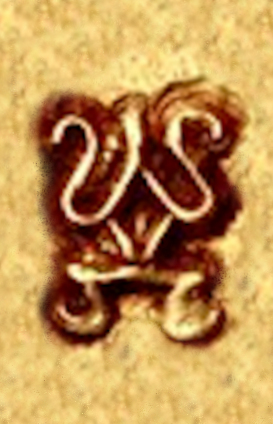
Coin in the name of Kushano-Sasanian king Varahran, struck under Kidarite ruler Kirada, circa 340-345. The Kidarite tamga symbol appears to the right of the standing king. Balkh mint.

The first evidence are gold coins discovered in Balkh dating from the mid-4th century. The Kushano-Sasanian ruler Varahran during the second phase of his reign, had to introduce the Kidarite tamga in his coinage minted at Balkh in Bactria, circa 340–345. The tamgha replaced the nandipada symbol which had been in use since Vasudeva I, suggesting that the Kidarites had now taken control, first under their ruler Kirada. Then ram horns were added to the effigy of Varahran on his coinage for a brief period under the Kidarite ruler Peroz, and raised ribbons were added around the crown ball under the Kidarite ruler Kidara. In effect, Varahran has been described as a "puppet" of the Kidarites. By 365, the Kidarite ruler Kidara I was placing his name on the coinage of the region, and assumed the title of Kushanshah. In Gandhara too, the Kidarites minted silver coins in the name of Varahran, until Kidara also introduced his own name there.

Archaeological, numismatic, and sigillographic evidence demonstrates the Kidarites ruled a realm just as refined as that of the Sasanians. They swiftly adopted Iranian imperial symbolism and titulature, as demonstrated by a seal; "Lord Ularg, the king of the Huns, the great Kushan-shah, the Samarkandian, of the Afrigan (?) family."

Most other data we currently have on the Kidarite kingdom are from Chinese and Byzantine sources from the middle of the 5th century. The Kidarites were the first Huna to bother India. Indian records note that the Hūna had established themselves in modern Afghanistan and the North-West Frontier Province by the first half of the 5th century, and the Gupta emperor Skandagupta had repelled a Hūna invasion in 455. The Kidarites are the last dynasty to regard themselves (on the legend of their coins) as the inheritors of the Kushan empire, which had disappeared as an independent entity two centuries earlier.

=== Migration into Bactria ===
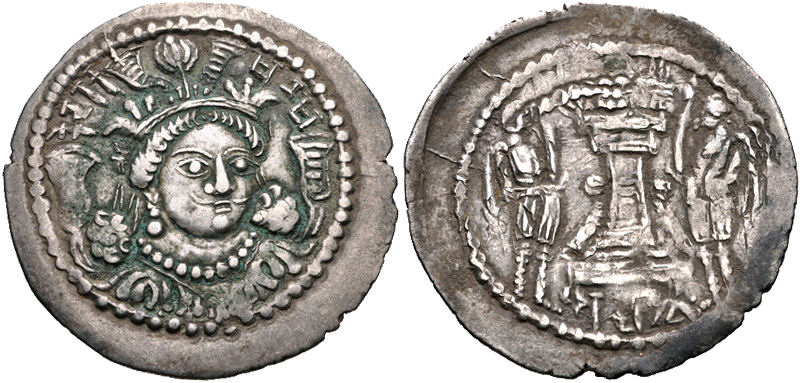
Kidara, circa 425–457. AR Drachm (29mm, 3.76 g, 3h). Mint C in Gandhara. Crowned bust facing slightly right. Brahmi legend around the head: Ki-da-ra Ku-ṣa-ṇa-ṣa/ Fire altar flanked by attendants. The use of the 3/4 portrait is sometimes attributed to the influence of the coinage of Byzantine Empire ruler Arcadius (377–408 CE).

South Asian polities circa 350 CE, and location of the Kidarites in Bactria, on the eve of their expansion into the Indian subcontinent.

Around 350, the Sasanian Emperor Shapur II (ruled 309 to 379) had to interrupt his conflict with the Romans, and abandon the siege of Nisibis, in order to face nomadic threats in the east: he was attacked in the east by Scythian Massagetae and other Central Asian tribes. Around this time, Xionite/Huna tribes, most likely the Kidarites, whose king was Grumbates, make an appearance as an encroaching threat upon Sasanian territory as well as a menace to the Gupta Empire (320–500).

After a prolonged struggle (353–358) they were forced to conclude an alliance, and their king Grumbates accompanied Shapur II in the war against the Romans, agreeing to enlist his light cavalrymen into the Persian army and accompanying Shapur II. The presence of "Grumbates, king of the Chionitae" and his Xionites with Shapur II during campaigns in the Western Caspian lands, in the area of Corduene, is described by the contemporary eyewitness Ammianus Marcellinus:

Grumbates Chionitarum rex novus aetate quidem media rugosisque membris sed mente quadam grandifica multisque victoriarum insignibus nobilis.
"Grumbates, the new king of the Xionites, while he was middle aged, and his limbs were wrinkled, he was endowed with a mind that acted grandly, and was famous for his many, significant victories."

— Ammianus Marcellinus, 18.6.22.

The presence of Grumbates alongside Shapur II is also recorded at the successful Siege of Amida in 359, in which Grumbates lost his son:

"Grumbates, king of the Chionitae, went boldly up to the walls to effect that mission, with a brave body of guards; and when a skilful reconnoitrer had noticed him coming within shot, he let fly his balista, and struck down his son in the flower of his youth, who was at his father's side, piercing through his breastplate, breast and all; and he was a prince who in stature and beauty was superior to all his comrades. "

— Ammianus Marcellinus, 19.1.7.

Later the alliance fell apart, and by the time of Bahram IV (388–399) the Sasanians had lost numerous battles against the Kidarites. The migrating Kidarites then settled in Bactria, where they replaced the Kushano-Sasanids, a branch of the Sasanids that had displaced the weakening Kushans in the area two centuries before. It is thought that they were in firm possession of the region of Bactria by 360. Since this area corresponds roughly to Kushanshahr, the former western territories of the Kushans, Kidarite ruler Kidara called himself "Kidara King of the Kushans" on his coins.

According to Priscus, the Sasanian Empire was forced to pay tribute to the Kidarites, until the rule of Yazdgird II (ruled 438–457), who refused payment.

The Kidarites based their capital in Samarkand, where they were at the center of Central Asian trade networks, in close relation with the Sogdians. The Kidarites had a powerful administration and raised taxes, rather efficiently managing their territories, in contrast to the image of barbarians bent on destruction given by Persian accounts.

==== Fortresses ====
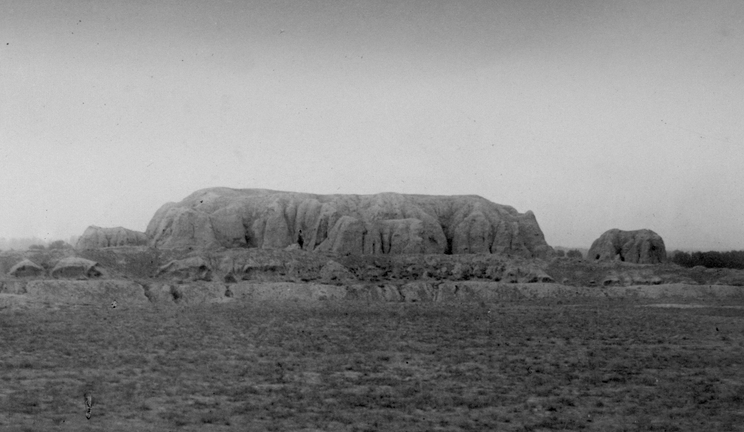
Fortress of Kafir-kala (Uzbekistan).

Kafir-kala is an ancient fortress 12 kilometers south of the city center of Samarkand in Uzbekistan, protecting the southern border of the Samarkand oasis. It consists in a central citadel built in mud-bricks and measuring 75 × 75 meters at its base has six towers and is surrounded by a moat, still visible today. Living quarters were located outside the citadel. The citadel was first occupied by the Kidarites in the 4th-5th century, whose coinage and bullae have been found.

=== Expansion to northwest India ===
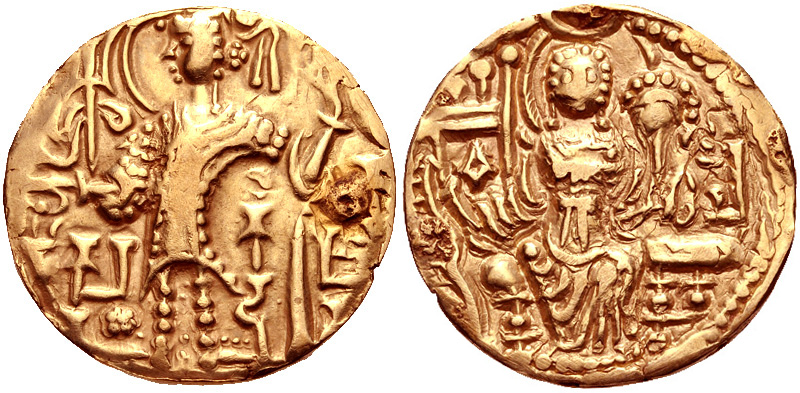
Kidara gold coin, circa 350–385, derived from the Kushans. Vertical Brahmi legends from right to left: Kushana ( Ku-shā-ṇa) Kidara ( Ki-da-ra) Kushana ( Ku-shā-ṇa). Enthroned goddess Ardoxsho on the back.

The Kidarites consolidated their power in Northern Afghanistan before conquering Peshawar and parts of northwest India including Gandhara probably sometime between 390 and 410, around the end of the rule of Gupta Emperor Chandragupta II or beginning of the rule of Kumaragupta I. It is probably the rise of the Hephthalites and the defeats against the Sasanians which pushed the Kidarites into northern India.

==== Economy ====
The Kidarites issued gold coins on the model of Kushan coinage, inscribing their own names but still claiming the Kushan heritage by using the title "Kushan". The volume of Kidarite gold coinage was nevertheless much smaller than that of the Great Kushans, probably owing to a decline of commerce and the loss of major international trade routes.

Coins with the title or name Gadahara seem to be the first coins issued by the invading Kidarites in the Kushan realm in India. The additional presence of the names of foreign rulers such as the Kushano-Sassanian Piroz or the Gupta Empire Samudragupta on the coins may suggest some kind of suzerainty at a time when the remnants of Kushan power were torn between these two powers. The "Gadahara" issues seem to come chronologically just before the issues of the famous Kidarite ruler Kidara.

==== Religion ====
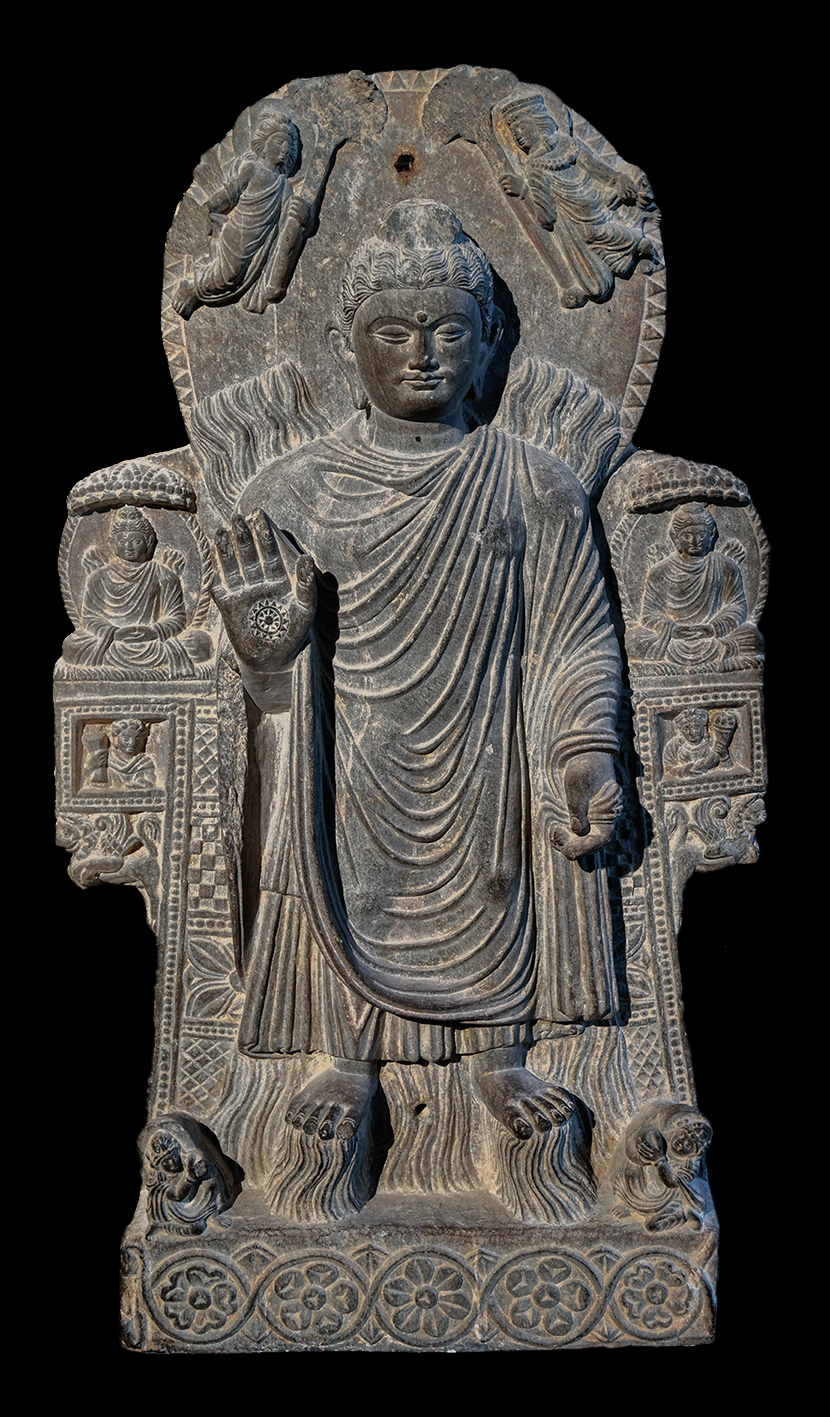
The Miracle of Sravasti from Paitava, possibly belongs to the Kidarite period.

It seems Buddhism was rather unaffected by Kidarite rule, as the religion continued to prosper. The Chinese pilgrim Fa-hsien visited the region c. 400 CE, and described a wealthy Buddhist culture. Some aspects of the Buddhist art of Gandhara seem to have incorporated Zoroastrian elements conveyed by the Kidarites at that time, such as the depiction of fire altars on the bases of numerous Buddhist sculptures.

It has been argued that the spread of Indian culture and religions as far as Sogdia corresponded to the rule of the Kidarites over the regions from Sogdia to Gandhara.

Some Buddhist works of art, in a style marking some evolution compared to the art of Gandhara, have been suggested as belonging to the Kidarite period, such as the sculptures of Paitava.

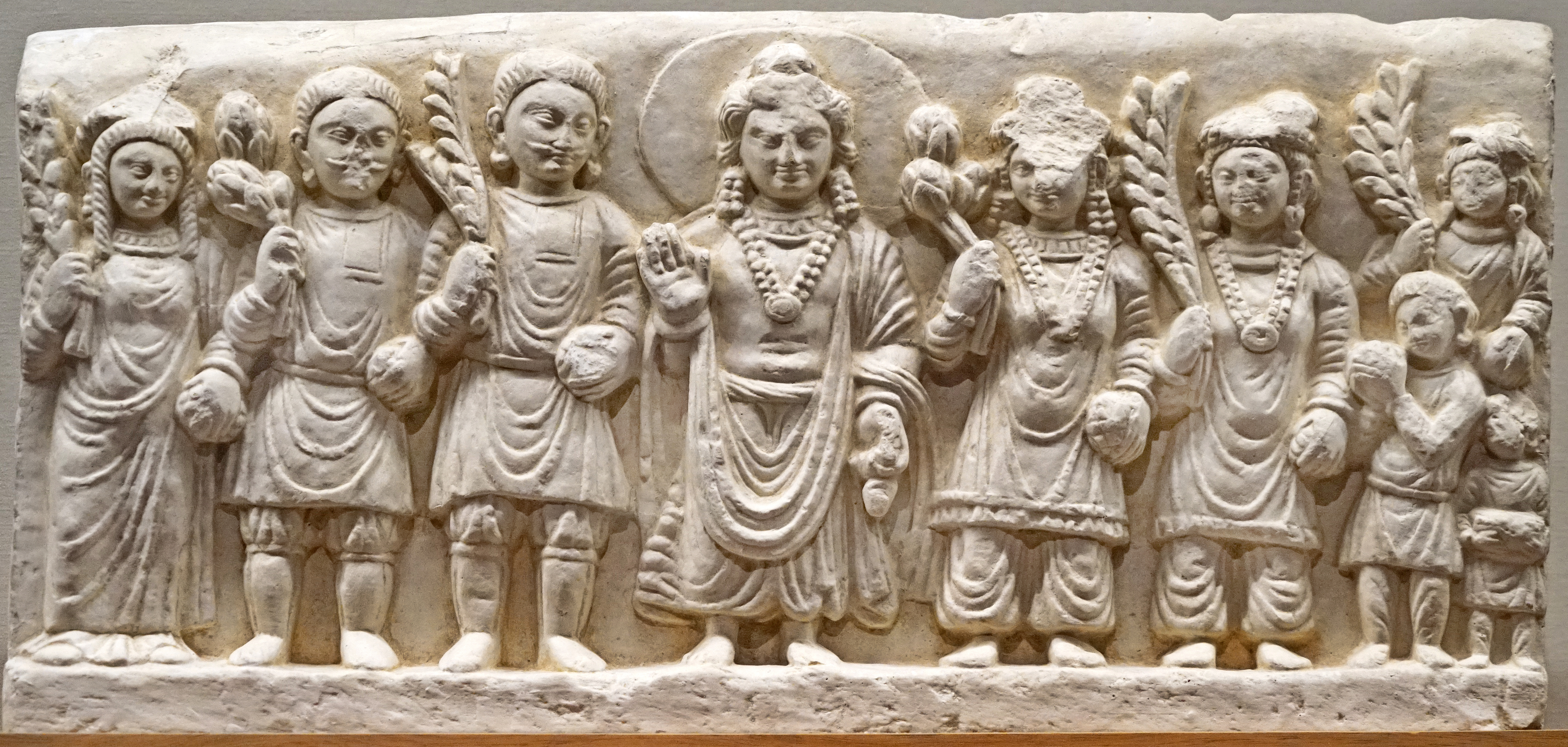
Devotees around Maitreya, the Buddha of the future (center). Paitava. The sculptures of Paitava may belong to the period of the Kidarites.

==== Conflicts with the Gupta Empire ====
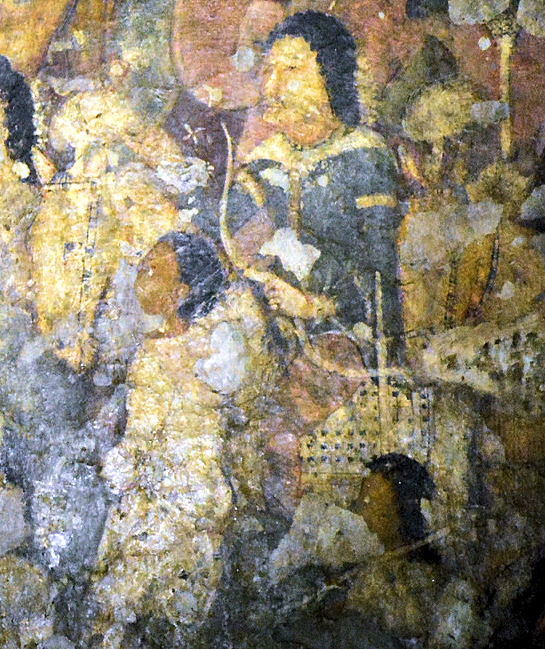
The Buddhist paintings of Ajanta, dated to c. 460–480, are contemporary of the end of the Kidarite invasion of northwestern India, and some scenes probably received the influence of the Kidarites or the Hephthalites after them.

The Kidarites may have confronted the Gupta Empire during the rule of Kumaragupta I (414–c. 455) as the latter recounts some conflicts, although very vaguely, in his Mandsaur inscription. The Bhitari pillar inscription of Skandagupta, inscribed by his son Skandagupta (c. 455 – c. 467), recalls much more dramatically the near-annihilation of the Gupta Empire, and recovery though military victories against the attacks of the Pushyamitras and the Hunas. The Kidarites are the only Hunas who could have attacked India at the time, as the Hephthalites were still trying to set foot in Bactria in the middle of the 5th century. In the Bhitari inscription, Skandagupta clearly mentions conflagrations with the Hunas, even though some portions of the inscription have disappeared:

"(Skandagupta), by whose two arms the earth was shaken, when he, the creator (of a disturbance like that) of a terrible whirlpool, joined in close conflict with the Hûnas; . . . . . . among enemies . . . . . . arrows . . . . . . . . . . . . proclaimed . . . . . . . . . . . . just as if it were the roaring of (the river) Ganga, making itself noticed in (their) ears."

— Bhitari pillar inscription of Skandagupta L.15

Even after these encounters, the Kidarites seem to have retained the western part of the Gupta Empire, particularly central and western Punjab, until they were displaced by the invasion of the Alchon Huns at the end of the 5th century. While they still ruled in Gandhara, the Kidarites are known to have sent an embassy to China in 477.

The Huna invasion are said to have seriously damaged Indo-Roman trade relations, which the Gupta Empire had greatly benefited from. The Guptas had been exporting numerous luxury products such as silk, leather goods, fur, iron products, ivory, pearl or pepper from centers such as Nasik, Paithan, Pataliputra or Benares etc. The Huna invasion probably disrupted these trade relations and the tax revenues that came with it. These conflicts exhausted the Gupta Empire: the gold coinage of Skandagupta is much fewer and of a lesser quality than that of his predecessors.

The Kidarites were cut from their Bactrian nomadic roots by the rise of the Hephthalites in the 450s. The Kidarites also seem to have been defeated by the Sasanian emperor Peroz in 467 CE, with Peroz reconquering Balkh and issuing coinage there as "Peroz King of Kings".

==== Conflict with Sasanian emperor Peroz I and the Hephthalites ====
Seal of "lord Uglarg, the King of the Huns, the great Kushanshah, the Afshiyan of Samarkand" (Bactrian: βαγο ογλαρ(γ)ο – υονανο þ(α)ο οα(ζ)-αρκο κο(þανοþ)[αοσαμαρ] /-κανδο – αφþιιανο). This ruler has "characteristic features identifying him as a Kidarite". Private collection of Aman ur Rahman.

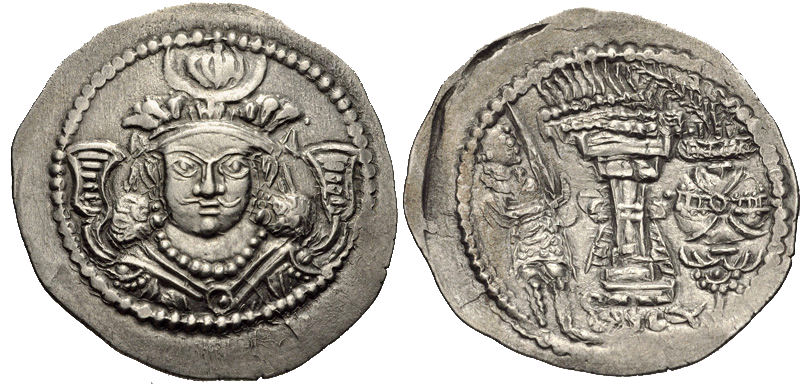
Kidarites ruler "King B", late 4th–early 5th century. A vase has been placed to the right of the Zoroastrian fire altar, the Indian/Hindu purnaghata, or "Vase of plenty".

Since the foundation of the Sasanian Empire, its rulers had demonstrated the sovereignty and power of their realm through collection of tribute, particularly from the Romans. However, the Sasanian efforts were disrupted in the early 5th century by the Kidarites, who forced Yazdegerd I (r. 399–420), Bahram V (r. 420–438), and/or Yazdegerd II (r. 438–457) to pay them tribute. Although this did not trouble the Sasanian treasury, it was nevertheless humiliating. Yazdegerd II eventually refused to pay tribute, which would later be used as the casus belli of the Kidarites, who declared war against the ruling Sasanian king Peroz I in c. 464. Peroz lacked manpower to fight, and therefore asked for financial aid by the Byzantine Empire, who declined his request. He then offered peace to the king of the Kidarites, Kunkhas, and offered him his sister in marriage, but sent a woman of low status instead. After some time Kunkhas found about Peroz's false promise, and then in turn tried to trick him, by requesting him to send military experts to strengthen his army.

When a group of 300 military experts arrived to the court of Kunkhas at Balaam (possibly Balkh), they were either killed or disfigured and sent back to Iran, with the information that Kunkhas did this due to Peroz's false promise. Around this time, Peroz allied himself with the Hephthalites or the Alchon Huns of Mehama, the ruler of Kadag in eastern Bactria. With their help, he finally vanquished Kidarites in 466, and brought Bactria briefly under Sasanian control, where he issued gold coins of himself at Balkh. The style of the gold coin was largely based on the Kidarite coins, and displayed Peroz wearing his second crown. The following year (467), a Sasanian embassy arrived to the Byzantine capital of Constantinople, where the victory over the Kidarites was announced. The Sasanian embassy sent to the Northern Wei in 468 may have likewise done the same.

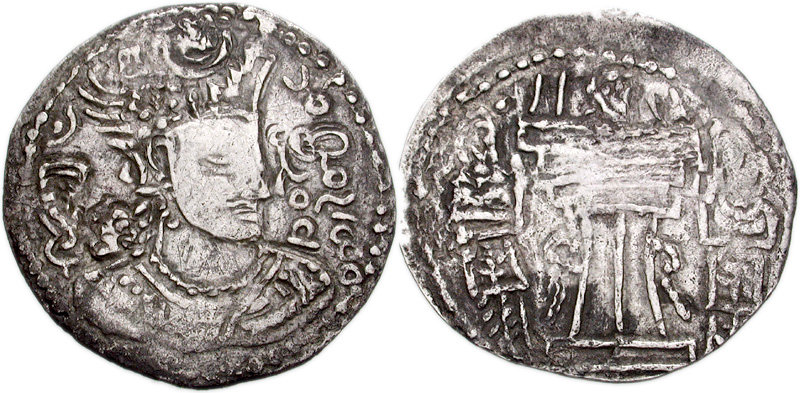
A coin of the late ruler Goboziko, imitating Sasanian king Bahram IV, in the Bactrian script. Crowned bust right; tamgha before. Fire altar with attendants. Circa mid 5th century CE.

Although the Kidarites still controlled some places such as Gandhara and Punjab, they would never be an issue for the Sasanians again. But in India itself, the Kidarites may also have been losing territory to the Gupta Empire, following the victories of Skandagupta of 455. This created a power vacuum, which the Alchon Huns were then able to fill, allowing them to reclaim the lost territories of the Kidarites.

==== Continental synchronism of Hunnic wars ====
There is an astounding synchronism between, on the one hand, the conflicts between the Kidarite Huns and the Sasanian Empire and the Gupta Empire, and, on the other hand, the campaigns of the Huns under Attila in Europe, leading to their defeat at the Catalaunian Plains in 451. It is almost as if the imperialist empire in the east and west had combined their response to a simultaneous Hunnic threat across Eurasia. In the end, Europe succeeded in repelling the Huns, and their power there quickly vanished, but in the east, both the Sasanian Empire and the Gupta Empire were left much weakened.

A few gold coins of the Kidarites were also found as far as Hungary and Poland in Europe, as a result of Asiatic migrations.

=== Kidarite successors ===
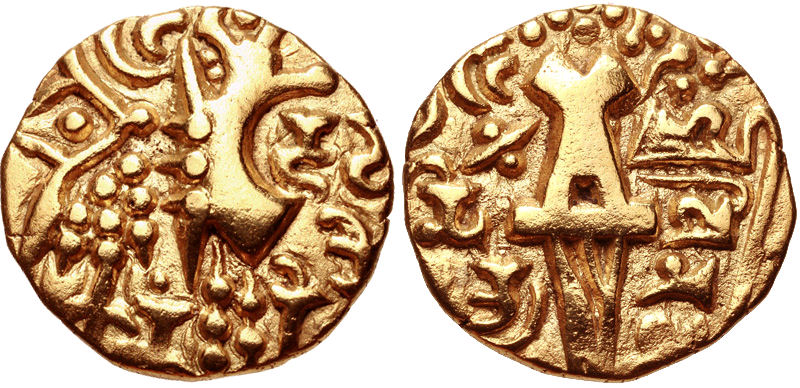
Coin of king Yinayaditya (also Vinayaditya), one of the "Kidarite successors", late 5th century, Jammu and Kashmir.

Many small Kidarite kingdoms seem to have survived in northwest India, and are known through their coinage. They were particularly present in Jammu and Kashmir, such as king Vinayaditya, but their coinage was much debased. They were then conquered by the Alchon Huns, sometimes considered as a branch of the Hephthalites, during the last quarter of the 5th century. The Alchon Huns followed the Kidarites into India circa 500, invading Indian territory as far as Eran and Kausambi.

The numismatic evidence as well as the so-called "Hephthalite bowl" from Gandhara, now in the British Museum, suggests a period of peaceful coexistence between the Kidarites and the Alchons, as it features two Kidarite noble hunters wearing their characteristic crowns, together with two Alchon hunters and one of the Alchons inside a medallion. At one point, the Kidarites withdrew from Gandhara, and the Alchons took over their mints from the time of Khingila. By 520, Gandhara was definitely under Hephthalite (Alchon Huns) control, according to Chinese pilgrims.

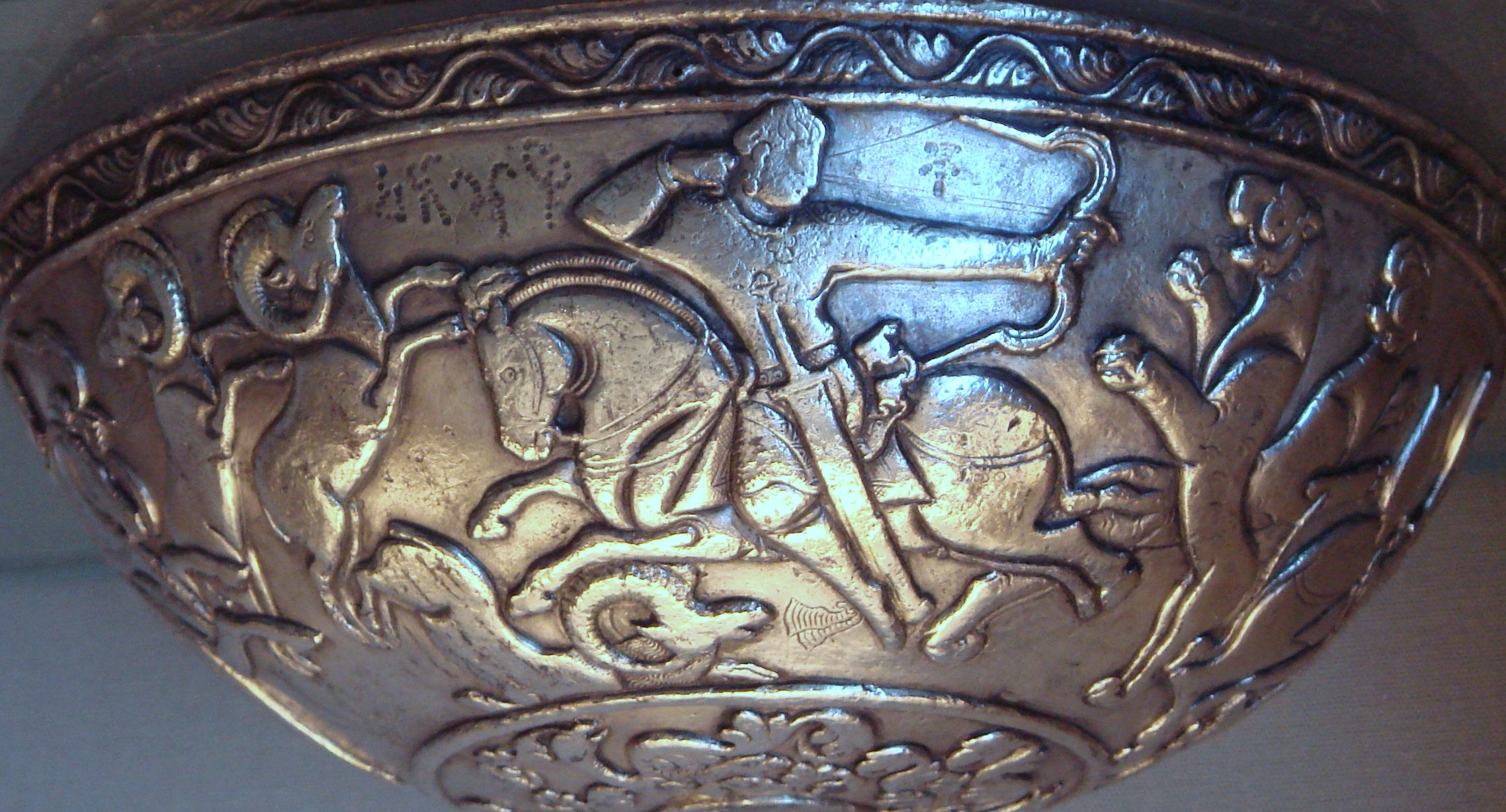
Silver bowl, showing an Alchon horseman

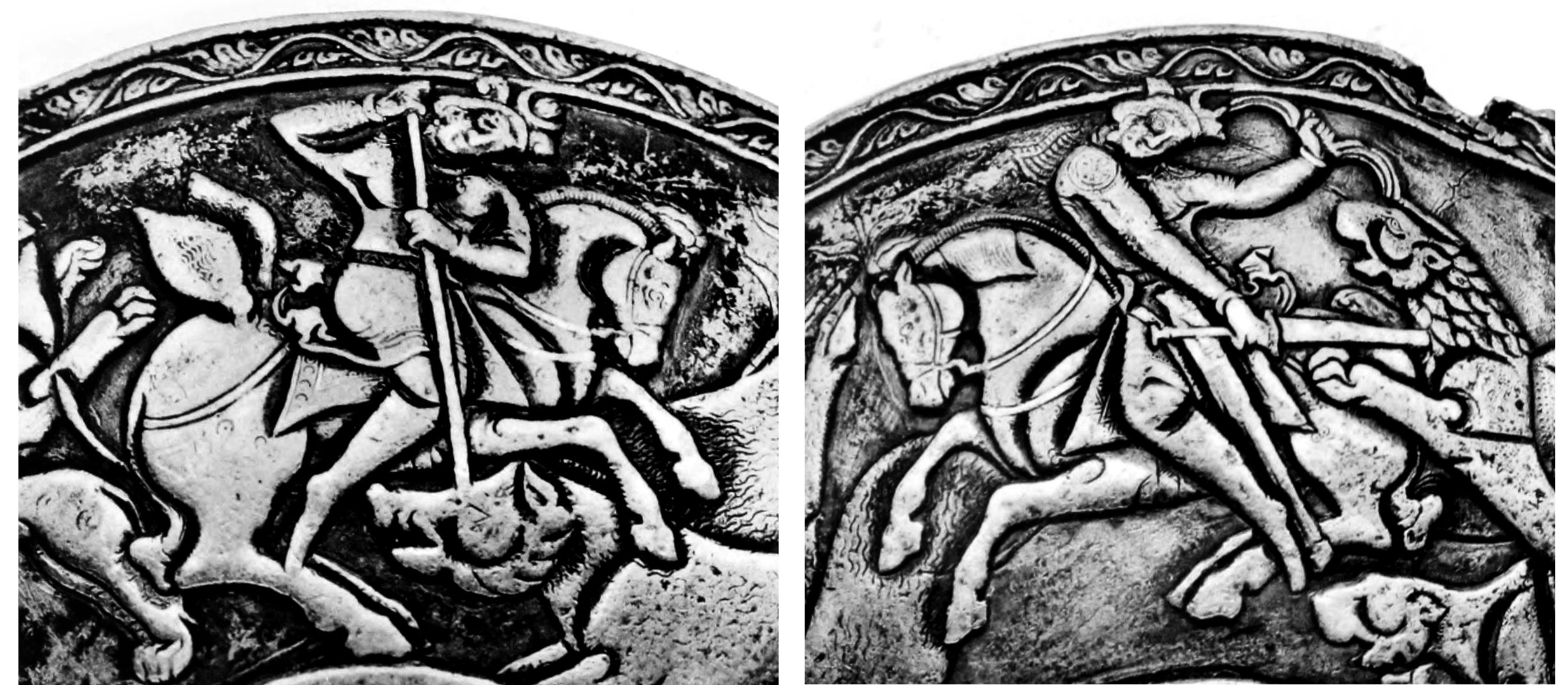
Two Kidarite princes on the bowl

The so-called "Hephthalite bowl" from Gandhara, features two Kidarite royal hunters wearing their characteristic horned crowns (right), similar to those in Kidarite coins (see Peroz), as well as two Alchon hunters (one of them shown here (left), with skull deformation), suggesting a period of peaceful coexistence between the two entities. Swat District, Pakistan, 460–479. British Museum.

Anania Shirakatsi states in his Ashkharatsuyts, written in 7th century, that one of the Bulgar tribes, known as the Kidar were part of the Kidarites. The Kidar took part in Bulgar migrations across the Volga into Europe.

==== Ushrushana ====
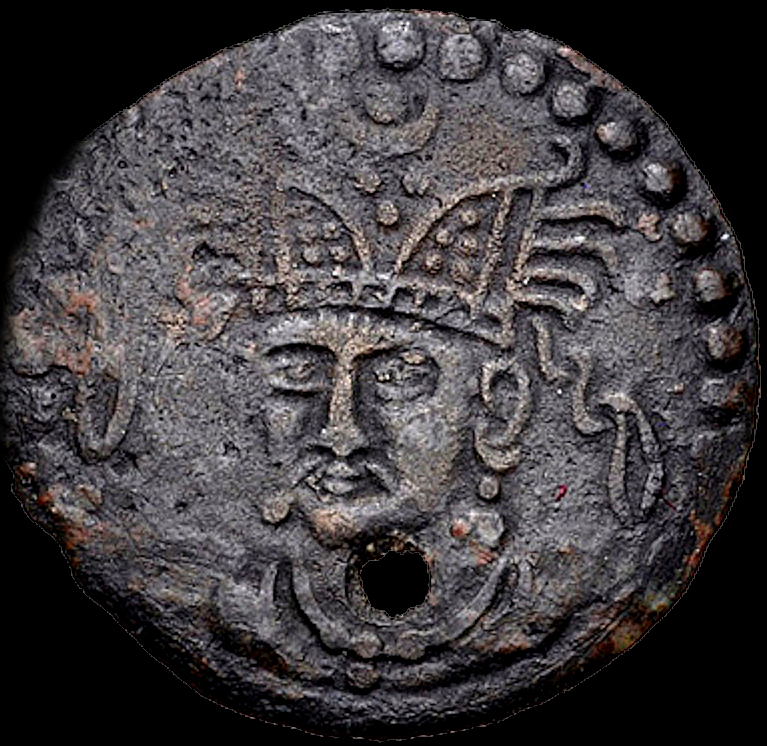
Portrait of ruler Rakhanch of the Principality of Ushrusana, from his coinage, 7th century CE

Remnants of the Kidarites in Eastern Sogdiana may have been associated with the Principality of Ushrusana. The Kidarites may have survived and possibly established a Kidarite kingdom in Usrushana. This connection may be apparent from the analysis of the coinage, and in the names of some Ushrusana rulers such as Khaydhar ibn Kawus al-Afshin, whose personal name is attested as "Khydhar", and was sometimes written wrongly as "Haydar" in Arabic. In effect, the name "Kydr" was quite popular in Usrushana, and is attested in many contemporary sources. The title Afshin used by the rulers of Usrushana is also attested in the Kidarite ruler of Samarkand of the 5th century named Ularg, who bore the similar title "Afshiyan" (Bactrian script: αφϸιιανο).

== Main Kidarite rulers ==
Yosada	c.335 CE
Kirada	c.335-345
Peroz	c.345-350
Kidara	c.350-390
Grumbates	c.359
Kungas	?
Brahmi Buddhatala	fl. c. 370
Piro	fl. 388/400
Varhran (II)	fl. c. 425
Goboziko	fl. c. 450
Salanavira	mid 400s
Vinayaditya	late 400s
Kandik	early 500s

== See also ==
- Uar (tribe)
- "Iranian Huns"
- Sasanian - Kidarite Wars

== Sources ==
- Alram, Michael (2014). "From the Sasanians to the Huns New Numismatic Evidence from the Hindu Kush". The Numismatic Chronicle. 174: 261–291. JSTOR 44710198. (registration required)
- Bonner, Michael (2020). The Last Empire of Iran. New York: Gorgias Press. pp. 1–406. ISBN 978-1463206161.
- Cribb, Joe (2018). Rienjang, Wannaporn; Stewart, Peter (eds.). Problems of Chronology in Gandhāran Art: Proceedings of the First International Workshop of the Gandhāra Connections Project, University of Oxford, 23rd-24th March, 2017. University of Oxford The Classical Art Research Centre Archaeopress. ISBN 978-1-78491-855-2.
- Cribb, Joe (2010). Alram, M. (ed.). "The Kidarites, the numismatic evidence.pdf". Coins, Art and Chronology Ii, Edited by M. Alram et al. Coins, Art and Chronology II: 91–146.
- Cribb, Joe; Donovan, Peter (2014). Kushan, Kushano-Sasanian, and Kidarite Coins A Catalogue of Coins From the American Numismatic Society by David Jongeward and Joe Cribb with Peter Donovan. p. 4.
- Daryaee, Touraj (2009). "Šāpur II". Encyclopaedia Iranica.
- Daryaee, Touraj (2014). Sasanian Persia: The Rise and Fall of an Empire. I.B.Tauris. pp. 1–240. ISBN 978-0857716668.
- Payne, Richard (2015). "The Reinvention of Iran: The Sasanian Empire and the Huns". In Maas, Michael (ed.). The Cambridge Companion to the Age of Attila. Cambridge University Press. pp. 282–299. ISBN 978-1-107-63388-9.
- Payne, Richard (2016). "The Making of Turan: The Fall and Transformation of the Iranian East in Late Antiquity". Journal of Late Antiquity. 9. Johns Hopkins University Press: 4–41. doi:10.1353/jla.2016.0011. S2CID 156673274.
- Potts, Daniel T. (2018). "Sasanian Iran and its northeastern frontier". In Mass, Michael; Di Cosmo, Nicola (eds.). Empires and Exchanges in Eurasian Late Antiquity. Cambridge University Press. pp. 1–538. ISBN 9781316146040.
- Rezakhani, Khodadad (2017). ReOrienting the Sasanians: East Iran in Late Antiquity. Edinburgh University Press. pp. 1–256. ISBN 9781474400305.
- Zeimal, E. V. (1996). "The Kidarite kingdom in Central Asia". History of Civilizations of Central Asia, Volume III: The Crossroads of Civilizations: A.D. 250 to 750. Paris: UNESCO. pp. 119–135. ISBN 92-3-103211-9.
- ENOKI, K., « On the Date of the Kidarites (I) », Memoirs of the Research Department of the Toyo Bunko, 27, 1969, p. 1–26.
- GRENET, F. « Regional Interaction in Central Asia and North-West India in the Kidarite and Hephtalite Period », in SIMS-WILLIAMS, N. (ed.), Indo-Iranian Languages and Peoples, (Proceedings of the British Academy), London, 2002, p. 203–224.
