= Peroz II Kushanshah =

Kushano-Sasanian Kingdom Kushanshah from 303 to 330

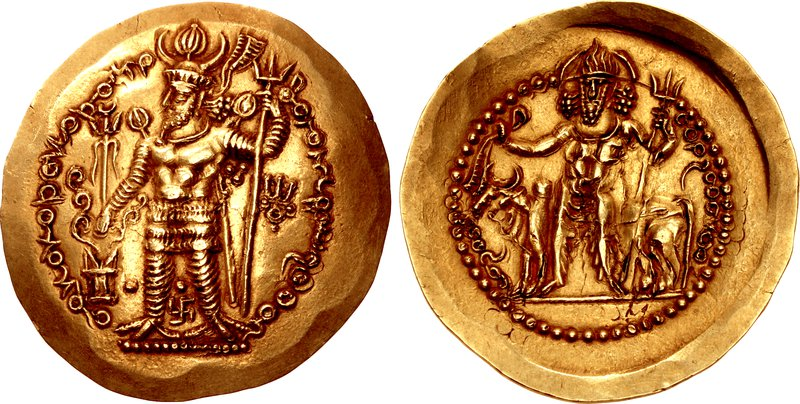
- Gold coin of Peroz II Kushanshah in Kushan style, possible Balkh mint. Peroz II is wearing his characteristic bull-horns crown.

Kushanshah of the Kushano-Sasanian Kingdom
- Reign: 303–330
- Predecessor: Hormizd II Kushanshah
- Successor: Varahran Kushanshah
- Died: 330
- Religion: Zoroastrianism

Peroz II Kushanshah (Bactrian script: Πιρωςο Κοϸανο ϸαηο) was the penultimate Kushanshah of the Kushano-Sasanian Kingdom from 303 to 330. He was the successor of Hormizd II Kushanshah.

Like his two previous predecessors—Hormizd I Kushanshah and Hormizd II Kushanshah—Peroz II had the same group of coins minted during his reign, with gold dinars and copper drachms provided from the main Kushano-Sasanian base of Tukharistan. However, Peroz II is called "the Great Kushan King" and not the "Kushan King of Kings" on his coins, hence renouncing their claim of kingship over the Sasanian Empire. Since the reign of Hormizd I Kushanshah, copper drachms were minted with the names of two local governors, Meze and Kavad. This was also continued under Peroz II.

In Gandhara, Peroz II issued copper coins with his characteristic "bull horns crown". However, he was the last of the Kushano-Sasanian rulers to issue such coins in Gandhara. After that point, the area was occupied by Shapur II, who issued his own coinage from Kabul.

Peroz II was succeeded by Varahran Kushanshah in Tukharistan, while the Sasanian King of Kings Shapur II (r. 309–379) incorporated Gandhara and Kabul into his own domains.

== Sources ==
- Cribb, Joe (2010). Alram, M. (ed.). "The Kidarites, the numismatic evidence.pdf". Coins, Art and Chronology Ii, Edited by M. Alram et al. Coins, Art and Chronology II: 91–146.
- Cribb, Joe; Donovan, Peter (2014). "Kushan, Kushano-Sasanian, and Kidarite Coins A Catalogue of Coins From the American Numismatic Society by David Jongeward and Joe Cribb with Peter Donovan". The American Numismatic Society: 4.
- Cribb, Joe (2018). Rienjang, Wannaporn; Stewart, Peter (eds.). Problems of Chronology in Gandhāran Art: Proceedings of the First International Workshop of the Gandhāra Connections Project, University of Oxford, 23rd-24th March, 2017. University of Oxford The Classical Art Research Centre Archaeopress. ISBN 978-1-78491-855-2.
- Daryaee, Touraj; Rezakhani, Khodadad (2017). "The Sasanian Empire". In Daryaee, Touraj (ed.). King of the Seven Climes: A History of the Ancient Iranian World (3000 BCE - 651 CE). UCI Jordan Center for Persian Studies. pp. 1–236. ISBN 978-0-692-86440-1.
- Rapp, Stephen H. (2014). The Sasanian World through Georgian Eyes: Caucasia and the Iranian Commonwealth in Late Antique Georgian Literature. London: Ashgate Publishing, Ltd. ISBN 978-1-4724-2552-2.
- Payne, Richard (2016). "The Making of Turan: The Fall and Transformation of the Iranian East in Late Antiquity". Journal of Late Antiquity. 9. Baltimore: Johns Hopkins University Press: 4–41. doi:10.1353/jla.2016.0011. S2CID 156673274.
- Rezakhani, Khodadad (2017). "East Iran in Late Antiquity". ReOrienting the Sasanians: East Iran in Late Antiquity. Edinburgh University Press. pp. 1–256. ISBN 978-1-4744-0030-5. JSTOR 10.3366/j.ctt1g04zr8. (registration required)
- Vaissière, Étienne de La (2016). "Kushanshahs i. History". Encyclopaedia Iranica.

Preceded by Hormizd II Kushanshah	Kushanshah of the Kushano-Sasanian Kingdom; 303–330	Succeeded by Varahran I Kushanshah
