= Peroz I Kushanshah =

Ruler of the Kushano-Sasanian Kingdom from 245 to 275

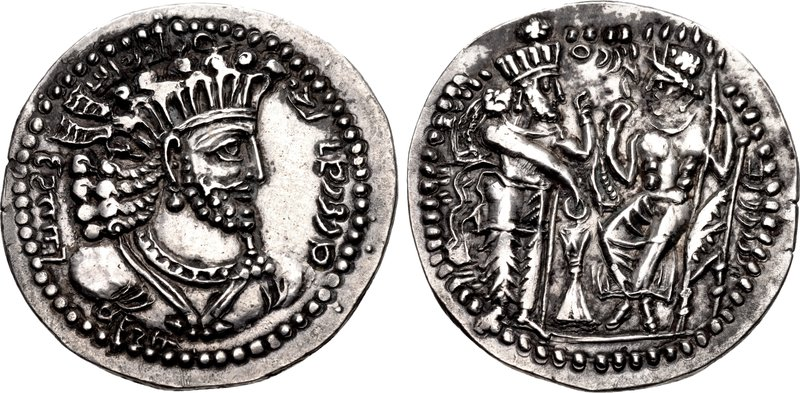
- Sasanian-style coin of Peroz I Kushanshah, minted at Herat. Obverse: King with Pahlavi legend around. "The Mazda-worshipping lord Peroz the Great Kushan Shah". Reverse: Peroz standing at left, holding an investiture wreath, facing Anahita rising from her throne.

Kushanshah of the Kushano-Sasanian Kingdom
- Reign: 245–275
- Predecessor: Ardashir I Kushanshah
- Successor: Hormizd I Kushanshah
- Died: 275
- Religion: Zoroastrianism

Peroz I Kushanshah (Bactrian script: Πιρωςο Κοϸανο ϸαηο) was Kushanshah of the Kushano-Sasanian Kingdom from 245 to 275. He was the successor of Ardashir I Kushanshah. He was an energetic ruler, who minted coins in Balkh, Herat, and Gandhara. Under him, the Kushano-Sasanians further expanded their domains into the west, pushing the weakened Kushan Empire to Mathura in North India.

Peroz I Kushanshah was succeeded by Hormizd I Kushanshah in 275.

== Name ==
"Peroz" is a Middle Persian name, meaning "victorious". Peroz I Kushanshah was notably the first ruler from the Sasanian family to use this name. Centuries later, the name would be used again by the imperial line of the Sasanians, commencing with Peroz I (r. 459–484).

== Reign ==
Map of the Kushano-Sasanian Kingdom

"Kushano-Sasanian" is a historiographic term used by modern scholars when referring to a dynasty of monarchs who supplanted the Kushan Empire in the Bactria region, and ultimately in both Kabulistan and Gandhara as well. According to the historian Khodadad Rezakhani, the dynasty was seemingly a young branch of the House of Sasan, and perhaps an offspring of one of the Sasanian King of Kings. It was founded by Ardashir I Kushanshah (r. 230–245) after his appointment by the first Sasanian King of Kings, Ardashir I (r. 224–242). The Kushano-Sasanians, in the same manner as the Kushans, used the title of Kushanshah ("Kushan King"), thus demonstrating a continuum with their predecessors. Peroz became Kushanshah in 245.

=== Sasanian-style coinage ===
Like his predecessor Ardashir I Kushanshah, Peroz is called the "Great Kushan King" and "Mazdean (Zoroastrian) lord" on his coins. In some of the rare coins of Peroz, the "Investiture issue", minted at Herat (HLYDY), the obverse legend reads mzdztn bgy pylwcy rb’ kwš’n mdw’ in Pahlavi, "The Mazda-worshipping lord Peroz the Great Kushan Shah". (Note: A similar reading on a coin of Ardashir I Kushanshah is given as mzdysn bgy arthštr RBA kwšan MLK "The Mazda-worshipping lord Ardashir the Great Kushan Shah" in Rezakhani, 2017, p.134) (Note: Also has been tranliterated as "Mazdesn bage Pérôze vazurg Kūsán Šáh (the Mazda-worshipping lord Péróz Great Kushān King')) On the reverse, Peroz is seen standing on the left, facing Anahita rising from her throne. Peroz is holding an investiture wreath over an altar and raising the left hand in gesture of benediction. Anahita also holds an investiture wreath and a scepter.

=== Kushan-style coinage ===
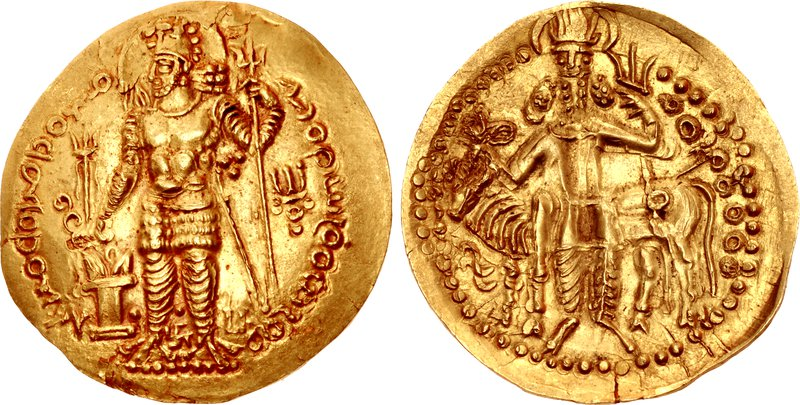
Coinage of Peroz I Kushanshah, imitating Kushan coins, minted at Balkh. Obverse: King in armour making an offering at an altar. Nandipada symbol, swastika between the legs, Brahmi letter Pi to the right. Bactrian legend around "Peroz the Great Kushan King" Reverse: Kushan god Oesho, Bactrian legend "The exalted God".

Peroz's reign marked a shift in Kushano-Sasanian coinage, which came to closely resemble the coinage of the Kushan emperors. He was the first Kushano-Sasanian ruler to issue coins on the Kushan model. The gold coins of Peroz tended to be scyphate and to imitate the design of Kushan ruler Vasudeva I. They were often minted at Balkh, in Bactria, north of the Hindu-Kush.

The visual aspect of this new coin type was almost identical to those of the Kushans, albeit with specific adjustments. The front of Peroz's coins portrays him standing in Kushan armour making an offering at an altar, at the same time holding a spear in his right hand (the armour style is rather described as Sasanian-style clothing by Rezakhani). Several symbols are included in the coin: a trident over the altar, what is often described as a Nandipada symbol behind the king, and a swastika between the legs. A Brahmi letter Pi has also been introduced to the right of the ruler, near the ground. The obverse has a legend in Bactrian script all around (starting 14:00 o'clock): Πιρωςο οοςορκο Κοϸανο ϸαηο "Peroz the Great Kushan King" In this, like his predecessor Ardashir I Kushanshah, Peroz called himself the "Great Kushan King".

The reverse has a Kushan-style representation of the Kushan god Oesho (in Bactrian Οηϸο on the corresponding Kushan coins), which uses the attributes of the Indian God Shiva, standing in front of the bull Nandi, and holding a trident and a diadem. This new reverse deity replaced the previous depictions of the Zoroastrian deities Mithra or Anahita in Kushano-Sasanian coinage. In the Kushan-style coinage of Peroz, although the depiction of the deity is visually similar to that on the Kushan coins, the legend is not the Kushan word Oesho (Οηϸο) anymore, but has been replaced by the Bactrian legend οορςοανδο ιαςοδο or BΟPZAΟANΔΟ IAZAΔΟ "The exalted God".

Apart from minting coins in the Kushano-Sasanian main base of Bactria, Peroz also had coins minted in Gandhara and Begram, and most likely in Peshawar as well. It was around this time that the Kushano-Sasanians began to expel the Kushans from Gandhara, pushing them to Mathura in North India, where their power was diminished from that of kings to local princes. Peroz was thus the first Kushano-Sasanian ruler to issue coins south of the Hindu-Kush, and he is known for several overstrikes over coins of the Kushan ruler Kanishka II.

=== The Ka'ba-ye Zartosht inscription ===
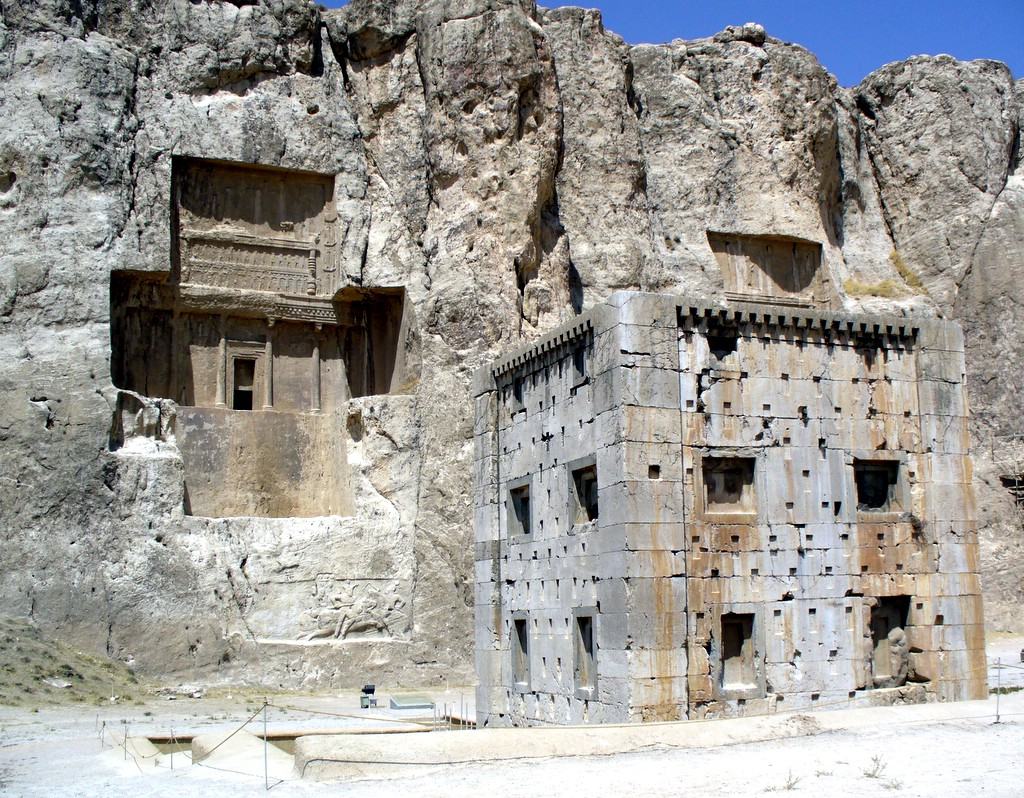
The Ka'ba-ye Zartosht, where the inscription of Shapur I is engraved

It was during Peroz's reign—in c. 262—that the Sasanian King of Kings Shapur I (r. 240–270) carved the Ka'ba-ye Zartosht inscription. On the inscription, Shapur I proclaimed himself as the suzerain of several regions, including that of the Kushano-Sasanians:

...I, the Mazda-worshipping lord, Shapur, king of kings of Iran and An-Iran… (I) am the Master of the Domain of Iran (Ērānšahr) and possess the territory of Pars, Parthia… Hindestan, the Domain of the Kushan up to the limits of Peshawar and up to Kash, Sogdia, and Chachestan. (Note: For the full context of the inscription, see Shapur I's inscription at the Ka'ba-ye Zartosht.)

Nevertheless, according to Rezakhani, the Kushano-Sasanians appear to have been too strong to have been plainly Sasanian governors, and their existence "may well reflect an early Sasanian continuation of the Arsacid imperial setting, acting as an allied, but autonomous, cadet branch of the Sasanian royal house". According to the historian Richard Payne, "the Kushano–Sasanian sub-kingdom ruled from Balkh on behalf of the Sasanian kings of kings". In 275, Peroz was succeeded by Hormizd I Kushanshah, a son of the King of Kings Bahram I (r. 271–274).

== Sources ==
- Cribb, Joe (2018). Rienjang, Wannaporn; Stewart, Peter (eds.). Problems of Chronology in Gandhāran Art: Proceedings of the First International Workshop of the Gandhāra Connections Project, University of Oxford, 23rd-24th March, 2017. University of Oxford The Classical Art Research Centre Archaeopress. ISBN 978-1-78491-855-2.
- Cribb, Joe (2010). Alram, M. (ed.). "The Kidarites, the numismatic evidence.pdf". Coins, Art and Chronology Ii, Edited by M. Alram et al. Coins, Art and Chronology II: 91–146.
- Daryaee, Touraj; Rezakhani, Khodadad (2017). "The Sasanian Empire". In Daryaee, Touraj (ed.). King of the Seven Climes: A History of the Ancient Iranian World (3000 BCE - 651 CE). UCI Jordan Center for Persian Studies. pp. 1–236. ISBN 978-0-692-86440-1.
- Payne, Richard (2016). "The Making of Turan: The Fall and Transformation of the Iranian East in Late Antiquity". Journal of Late Antiquity. 9. Baltimore: Johns Hopkins University Press: 4–41. doi:10.1353/jla.2016.0011. S2CID 156673274.
- Rapp, Stephen H. (2014). The Sasanian World through Georgian Eyes: Caucasia and the Iranian Commonwealth in Late Antique Georgian Literature. London: Ashgate Publishing, Ltd. ISBN 978-1-4724-2552-2.
- Rezakhani, Khodadad (2017). "East Iran in Late Antiquity". ReOrienting the Sasanians: East Iran in Late Antiquity. Edinburgh University Press. pp. 1–256. ISBN 978-1-4744-0030-5. JSTOR 10.3366/j.ctt1g04zr8. (registration required)
- Rypka, Jan; Jahn, Karl (1968). History of Iranian literature. D. Reidel. ISBN 9789401034791.
- Sastri, Nilakanta (1957). A Comprehensive History of India: The Mauryas & Satavahanas. Orient Longmans. p. 246. ISBN 9788170070030.
- Vaissière, Étienne de La (2016). "Kushanshahs i. History". Encyclopaedia Iranica.
- Wiesehöfer, Joseph (1986). "Ardašīr I i. History". Encyclopaedia Iranica, Vol. II, Fasc. 4. pp. 371–376.

Regnal titles
Preceded by Ardashir I Kushanshah	Kushanshah of the Kushano-Sasanian Kingdom; 245–275	Succeeded by Hormizd I Kushanshah
