= Kushanshah =

Rulers of the Kushano-Sasanian Kingdom

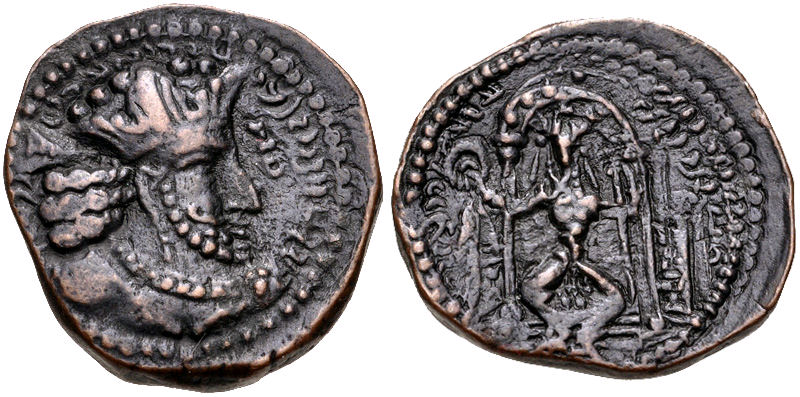
Kushano-Sasanian ruler Ardashir I Kushanshah, circa 230-250 CE. Merv mint.

Kushanshah (Bactrian: KΟÞANΟ ÞAΟ, Koshano Shao, Pahlavi: Kwšan MLK Kushan Malik) was the title of the rulers of the Kushano-Sasanian Kingdom, the parts of the former Kushan Empire in the areas of Sogdiana, Bactria and Gandhara, named Kushanshahr and held by the Sasanian Empire, during the 3rd and 4th centuries CE. They are collectively known as Kushano-Sasanians, or Indo-Sasanians.

The Kushanshahs minted their own coinage, and took the title of Kushanshas, ie "Kings of the Kushans". This administration continued until 360 CE. The Kushanshas are mainly known through their coins.

A rebellion of Hormizd I Kushanshah (277-286 CE), who issued coins with the title Kushanshahanshah (KΟÞANΟ ÞAΟNΟNΟ ÞAΟ "King of kings of the Kushans"), seems to have occurred against contemporary emperor Bahram II (276-293 CE) of the Sasanian Empire, but failed.

The title is first attested in the Paikuli inscription of the Sasanian shah Narseh in ca. 293, where it functioned as a title for the Sasanian governors of the eastern portion of the empire. The title was also used by the Kidarite dynasty, which was the last kingdom to make use of it.

== Main Kushanshahs ==
The following Kushanshahs were:

- Ardashir I Kushanshah (230–245)
- Peroz I Kushanshah (245–275)
- Hormizd I Kushanshah (275–300)
- Hormizd II Kushanshah (300–303)
- Peroz II Kushanshah (303–330)
- Varahran I Kushanshah (330-365)

== Sources ==
- Cribb, Joe (2018). Rienjang, Wannaporn; Stewart, Peter (eds.). Problems of Chronology in Gandhāran Art: Proceedings of the First International Workshop of the Gandhāra Connections Project, University of Oxford, 23rd-24th March, 2017. University of Oxford The Classical Art Research Centre Archaeopress. ISBN 978-1-78491-855-2.
- Cribb, Joe (2010). Alram, M. (ed.). "The Kidarites, the numismatic evidence.pdf". Coins, Art and Chronology Ii, Edited by M. Alram et al. Coins, Art and Chronology II: 91–146.
- Daryaee, Touraj; Rezakhani, Khodadad (2017). "The Sasanian Empire". In Daryaee, Touraj (ed.). King of the Seven Climes: A History of the Ancient Iranian World (3000 BCE - 651 CE). UCI Jordan Center for Persian Studies. pp. 1–236. ISBN 978-0-692-86440-1.
- Payne, Richard (2016). "The Making of Turan: The Fall and Transformation of the Iranian East in Late Antiquity". Journal of Late Antiquity. 9. Baltimore: Johns Hopkins University Press: 4–41. doi:10.1353/jla.2016.0011. S2CID 156673274.
- Rapp, Stephen H. (2014). The Sasanian World through Georgian Eyes: Caucasia and the Iranian Commonwealth in Late Antique Georgian Literature. London: Ashgate Publishing, Ltd. ISBN 978-1-4724-2552-2.
- Rezakhani, Khodadad (2017). "East Iran in Late Antiquity". ReOrienting the Sasanians: East Iran in Late Antiquity. Edinburgh University Press. pp. 1–256. ISBN 978-1-4744-0030-5. JSTOR 10.3366/j.ctt1g04zr8. (registration required)
- Rypka, Jan; Jahn, Karl (1968). History of Iranian literature. D. Reidel. ISBN 9789401034791.
- Sastri, Nilakanta (1957). A Comprehensive History of India: The Mauryas & Satavahanas. Orient Longmans. p. 246. ISBN 9788170070030.
- Vaissière, Étienne de La (2016). "Kushanshahs i. History". Encyclopaedia Iranica.
- Wiesehöfer, Joseph (1986). "Ardašīr I i. History". Encyclopaedia Iranica, Vol. II, Fasc. 4. pp. 371–376.
