= Kushano-Sasanian Kingdom =

Branch of Sasanian Persians ruling Bactria (c. 230–365)

Kushano-Sasanian Kingdom Kushanshahr
- c. 230 CE–c. 365 CE
- Map of the domains governed by the Kushano-Sasanian Kingdom
- Capital: Balkh
- Common languages: Middle Persian; Bactrian
- Religion: Buddhism; Jainism; Zoroastrianism; Hinduism
- Government: Feudal monarchy
- Kushanshah
  - 233-245: Ardashir I Kushanshah
  - 330-365: Varahran Kushanshah
- Historical era: Late Antiquity
  - Established: 230 CE c. 230 CE
  - Disestablished: c. 365 CE
Preceded by	Succeeded by
Kushan Empire; Paratarajas	Kidarites; Gupta Empire
- Today part of: Pakistan; Afghanistan; Turkmenistan

The Kushano-Sasanian Kingdom also known as the Indo-Sasanian Kingdom was a polity established by the Sasanian Empire in Bactria during the 3rd and 4th centuries. The Sasanian Empire captured the provinces of Sogdia, Bactria and Gandhara from the declining Kushan Empire following a series of wars in 225 CE. The local Sasanian governors then went on to take the title of Kushanshah (KΟÞANΟ ÞAΟ or Koshano Shao in the Bactrian language) or "King of the Kushans", and to mint coins. They are sometimes considered as forming a "sub-kingdom" inside the Sasanian Empire.

This administration continued until 360–370, when the Kushano-Sasanians lost much of their domains to the invading Kidarites; the remainder was incorporated into the Sasanian Empire proper. Later, the Kidarites were in turn displaced by the Hephthalites.

The Kushanshahs are mainly known through their coins. Their coins were minted at Kabul, Balkh, Herat, and Merv, attesting the extent of their realm.

A rebellion of Hormizd I Kushanshah (277–286 CE), who issued coins with the title Kushan-shahanshah ("King of kings of the Kushans"), seems to have occurred against contemporary emperor Bahram II (276–293 CE) of the Sasanian Empire, but failed.

== History ==
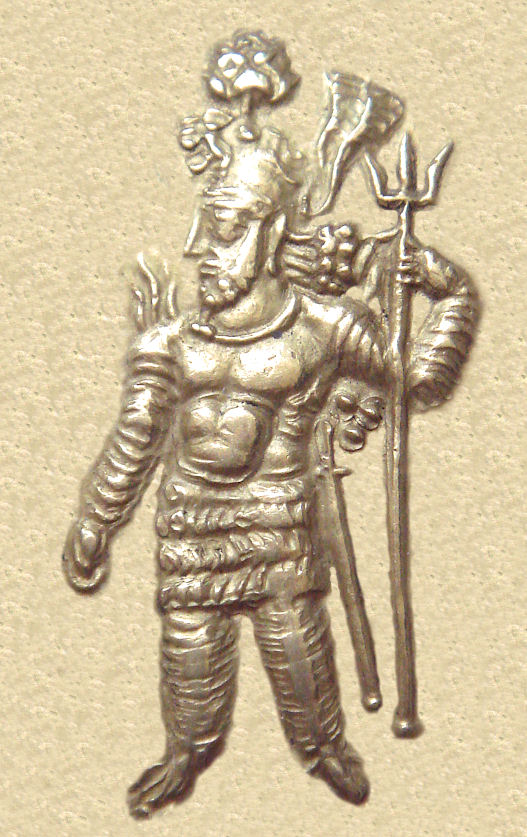
Portrait of Kushano-Sasanian ruler Hormizd I Kushanshah (c. 277-286 CE) in Kushan style.

The Sassanids, shortly after victory over the Parthians, extended their dominion into Bactria during the reign of Ardashir I around 230 CE, then further to the eastern parts of their empire in western Pakistan during the reign of his son Shapur I (240–270). Thus the Kushans lost their western territory (including Bactria and Gandhara) to the rule of Sassanid nobles named Kushanshahs or "Kings of the Kushans". The farthest extent of the Kushano-Sasanians to the east appears to have been Gandhara, and they apparently did not cross the Indus River, since almost none of their coinage has been found in the city of Taxila just beyond the Indus.

The Kushano-Sasanians under Hormizd I Kushanshah seem to have led a rebellion against contemporary emperor Bahram II (276-293 CE) of the Sasanian Empire, but failed. According to the Panegyrici Latini (3rd-4th century CE), there was a rebellion of a certain Ormis (Ormisdas) against his brother Bahram II, and Ormis was supported by the people of Saccis (Sakastan). Hormizd I Kushanshah issued coins with the title Kushanshahanshah ("King of kings of the Kushans"), probably in defiance of imperial Sasanian rule.

Around 325, Shapur II was directly in charge of the southern part of the territory, while in the north the Kushanshahs maintained their rule. Important finds of Sasanian coinage beyond the Indus in the city of Taxila only start with the reigns of Shapur II (r.309-379) and Shapur III (r.383-388), suggesting that the expansion of Sasanian control beyond the Indus was the result of the wars of Shapur II "with the Chionites and Kushans" in 350-358 as described by Ammianus Marcellinus. They probably maintained control until the rise of the Kidarites under their ruler Kidara.

The decline of the Kushans and their defeat by the Kushano-Sasanians and the Sasanians, was followed by the rise of the Kidarites and then the Hephthalites (Alchon Huns) who in turn conquered Bactria and Gandhara and went as far as central India. They were later followed by Turk Shahi and then the Hindu Shahi, until the arrival of Muslims to north-western parts of India.

== Religious influences ==
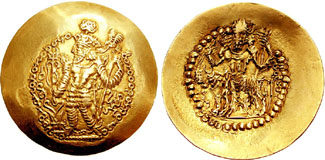
Coin of the last Kushano-Sasanian ruler Bahram Kushanshah (circa 350-365 CE) in Kushan style. Obv: Bahram with characteristic headdress. Rev: Shiva with Nandi in Kushan style.

Coins depicting Shiva and Nandi have been discovered, indicating a strong influence of Hinduism.

The prophet Mani (210–276), founder of Manichaeism, followed the Sasanian expansion to the east, which exposed him to the thriving Buddhist culture of Gandhara. He is said to have visited Bamiyan, where several religious paintings are attributed to him, and is believed to have lived and taught for some time. He is also related to have sailed to the Indus Valley area (now in Pakistan) in 240 or 241 and converted a Buddhist king, the Turan Shah of India.

On that occasion, various Buddhist influences seem to have permeated Manichaeism: "Buddhist influences were significant in the formation of Mani's religious thought. The transmigration of souls became a Manichaean belief, and the quadripartite structure of the Manichaean community, divided between male and female monks (the 'elect') and lay follower (the 'hearers') who supported them, appears to be based on that of the Buddhist sangha".

The cult of Mithra also flourished and Mithra was regarded as a divine protector of Kushano-Sasanian rulers.

== Coinage ==
The Kushano-Sassanids created an extensive coinage with legend in Brahmi, Pahlavi or Bactrian, sometimes inspired from Kushan coinage, and sometimes more clearly Sassanid.

The obverse of the coin usually depicts the ruler with elaborate headdress and on the reverse either a fire temple or Shiva with Nandi.

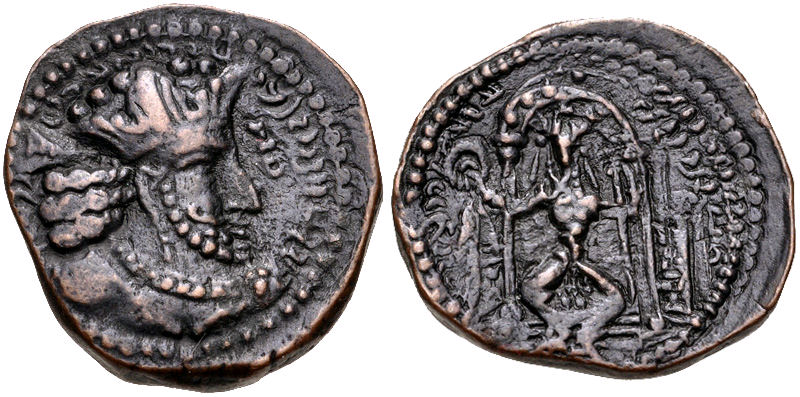
Kushano-Sasanian ruler Ardashir I Kushanshah, circa 230-250 CE. Merv mint.

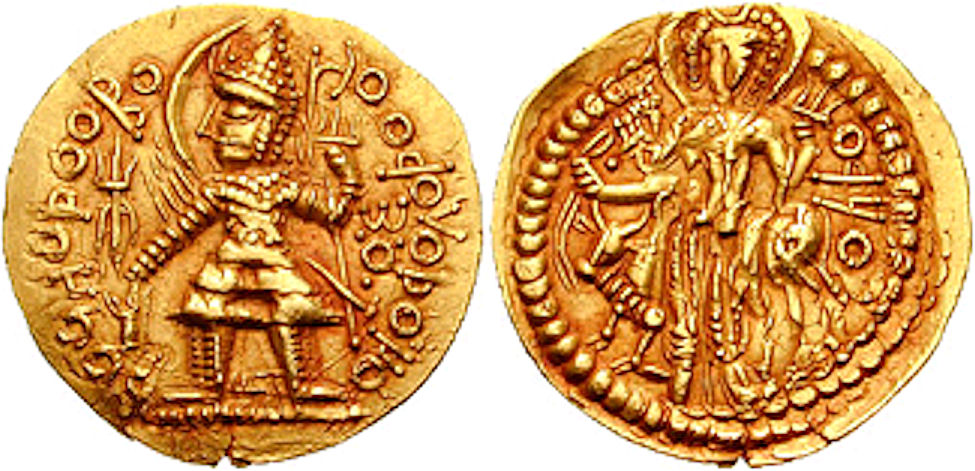
Ardashir I Kushanshah in the name of Kushan ruler Vasudeva I, circa 230-245 CE.

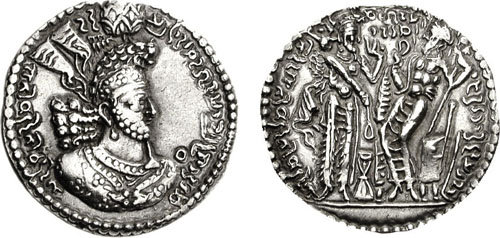
Hormizd I Kushanshah with mention of Mazda and Anahita. Merv mint.

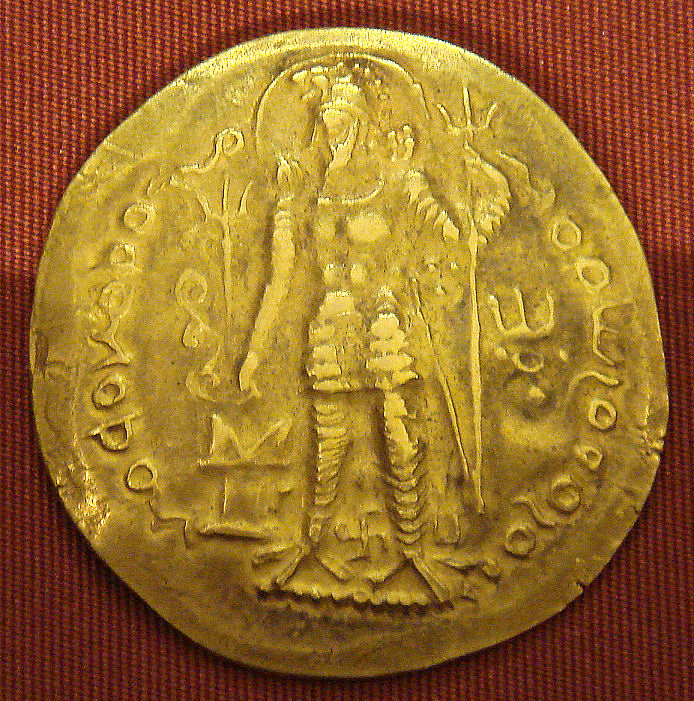
Indo-Sassanid coin.

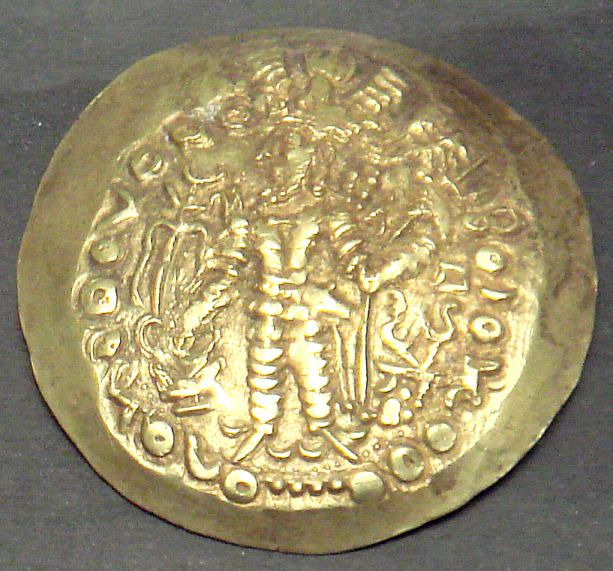
A gold Indo-Sassanid coin.

== Kushano-Sasanian art ==
The Indo-Sassanids traded goods such as silverware and textiles depicting the Sassanid emperors engaged in hunting or administering justice.

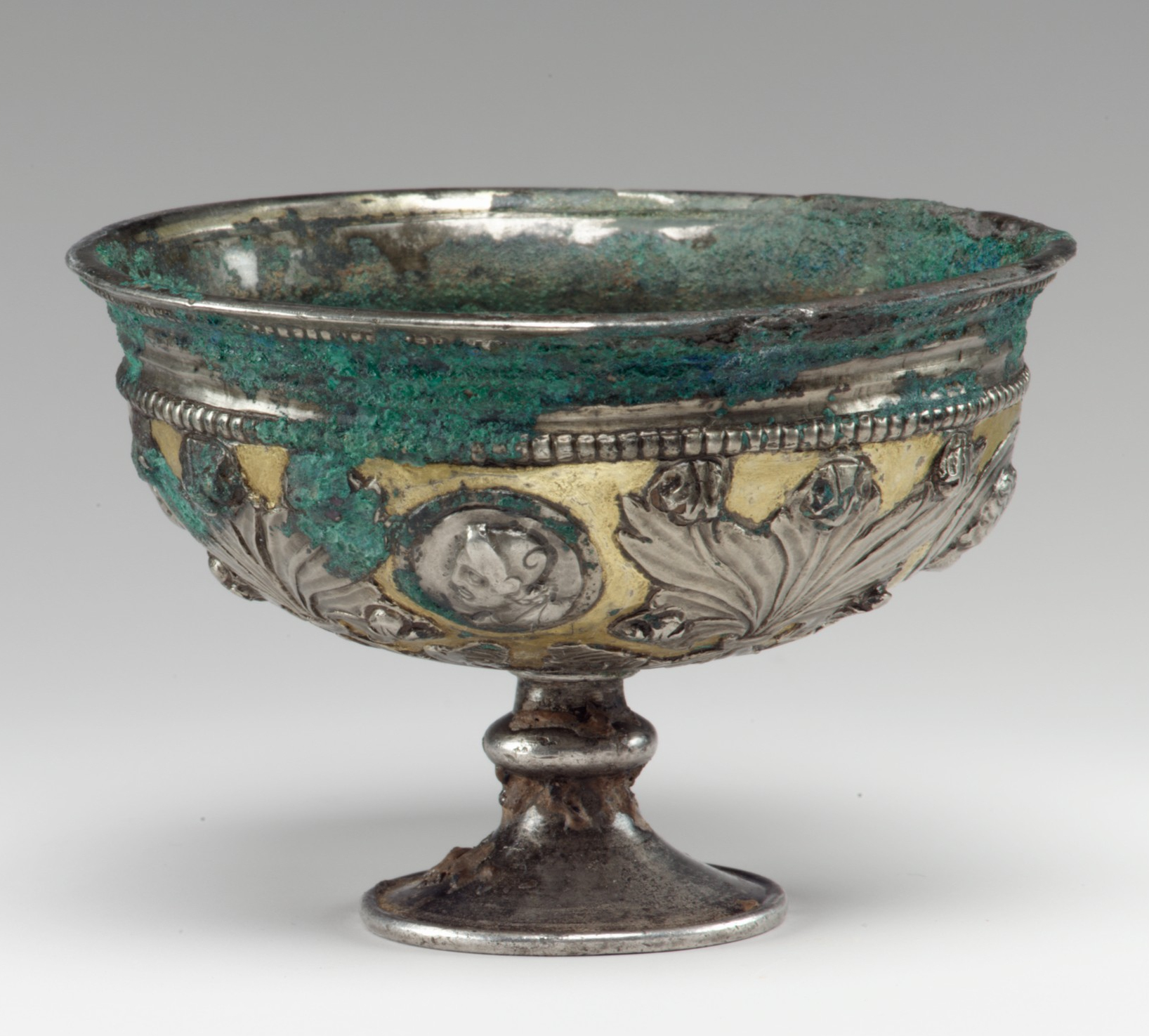
Kushano-Sasanian footed cup with medallion, 3rd-4th century CE, Bactria, Metropolitan Museum of Art.

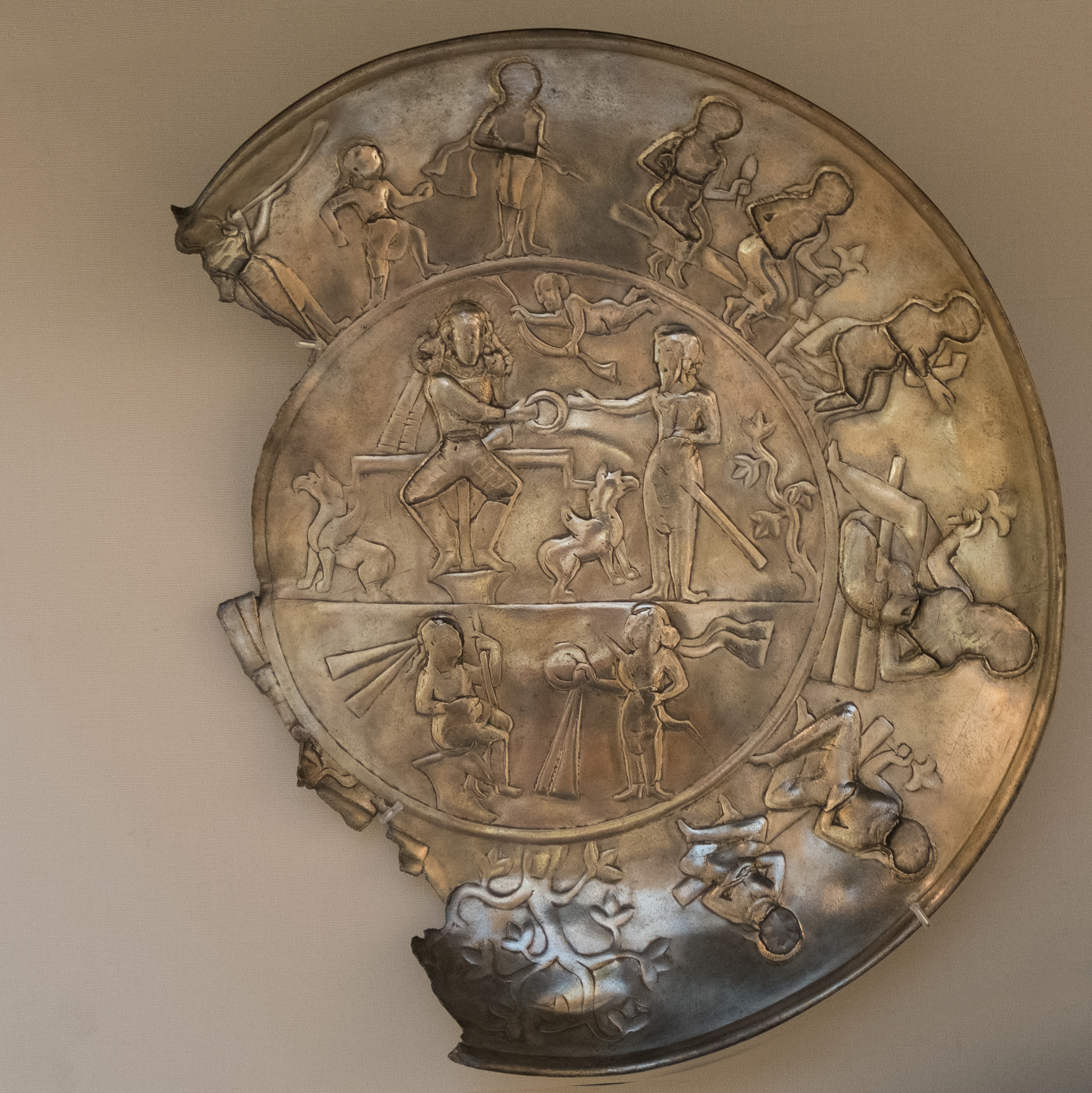
Possible Kushano-Sasanian plate, excavated in Rawalpindi, Pakistan, 350-400 CE. British Museum 124093.

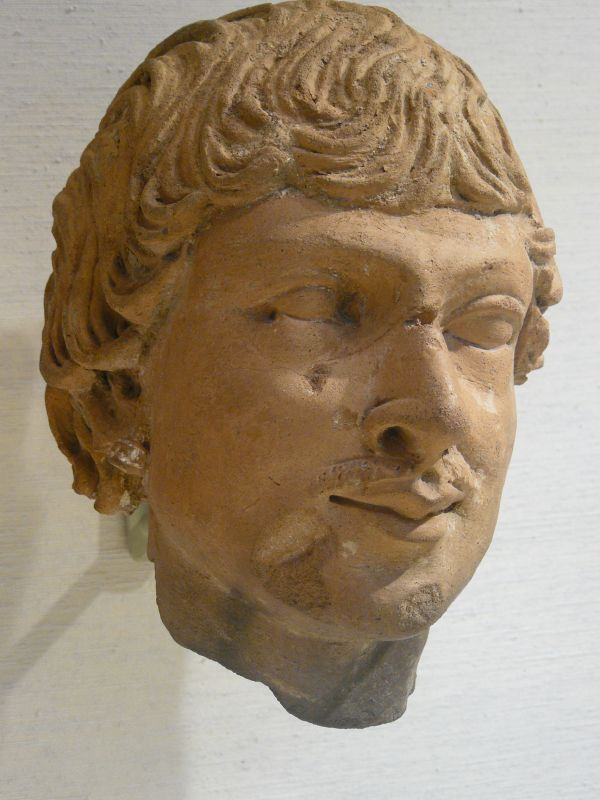
Terracotta head of a male figure, Kushano-Sasanian period, Gandhara region, 4th-5th century CE

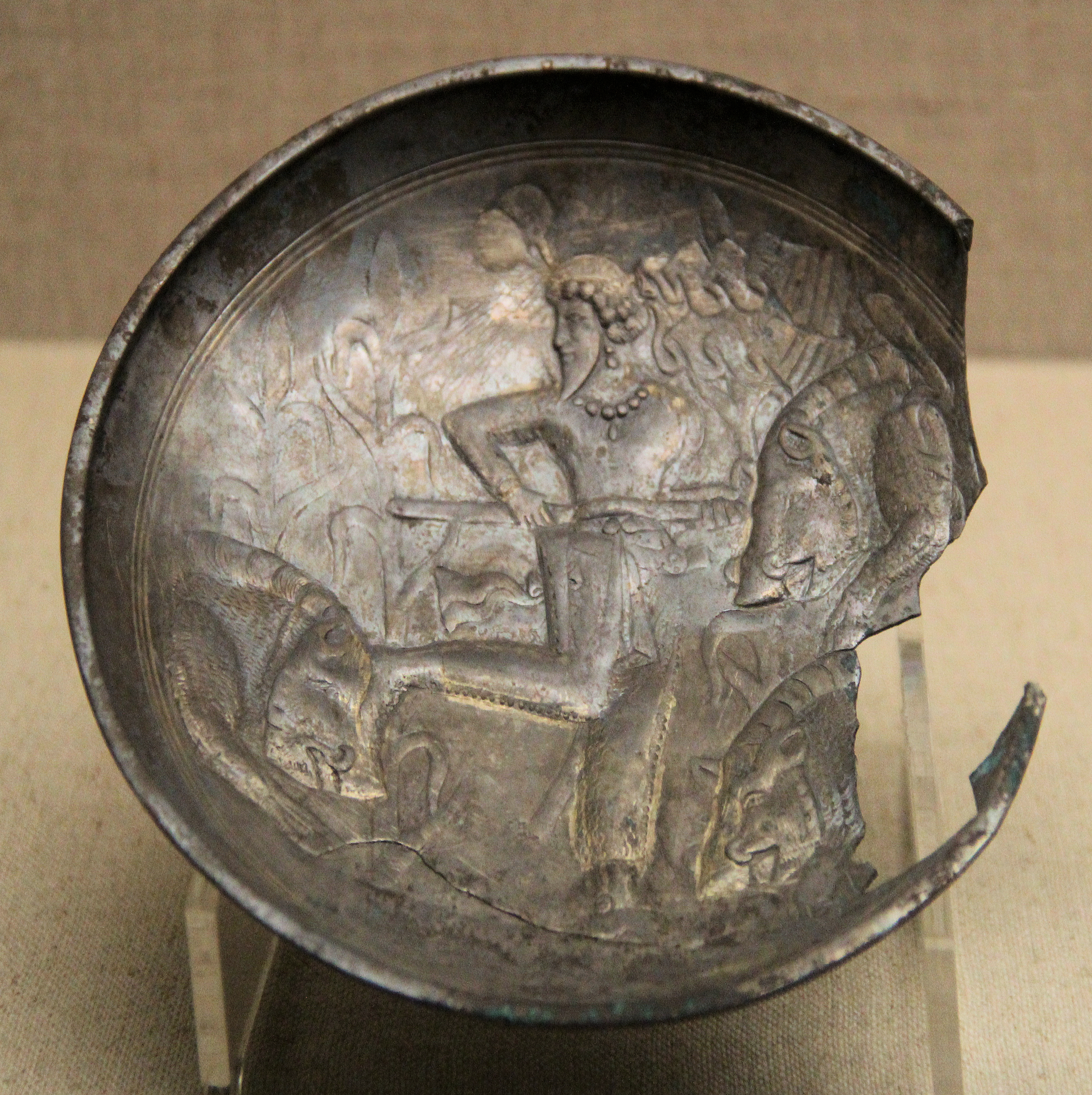
A probable Kushano-Sasanian plate with hunting scene, found in the 504 CE tomb of Feng Hetu in China. Shanxi Museum. It is dated the 3rd-4th century CE, and was probably manufactured in northern Afghanistan.

=== Artistic influences ===
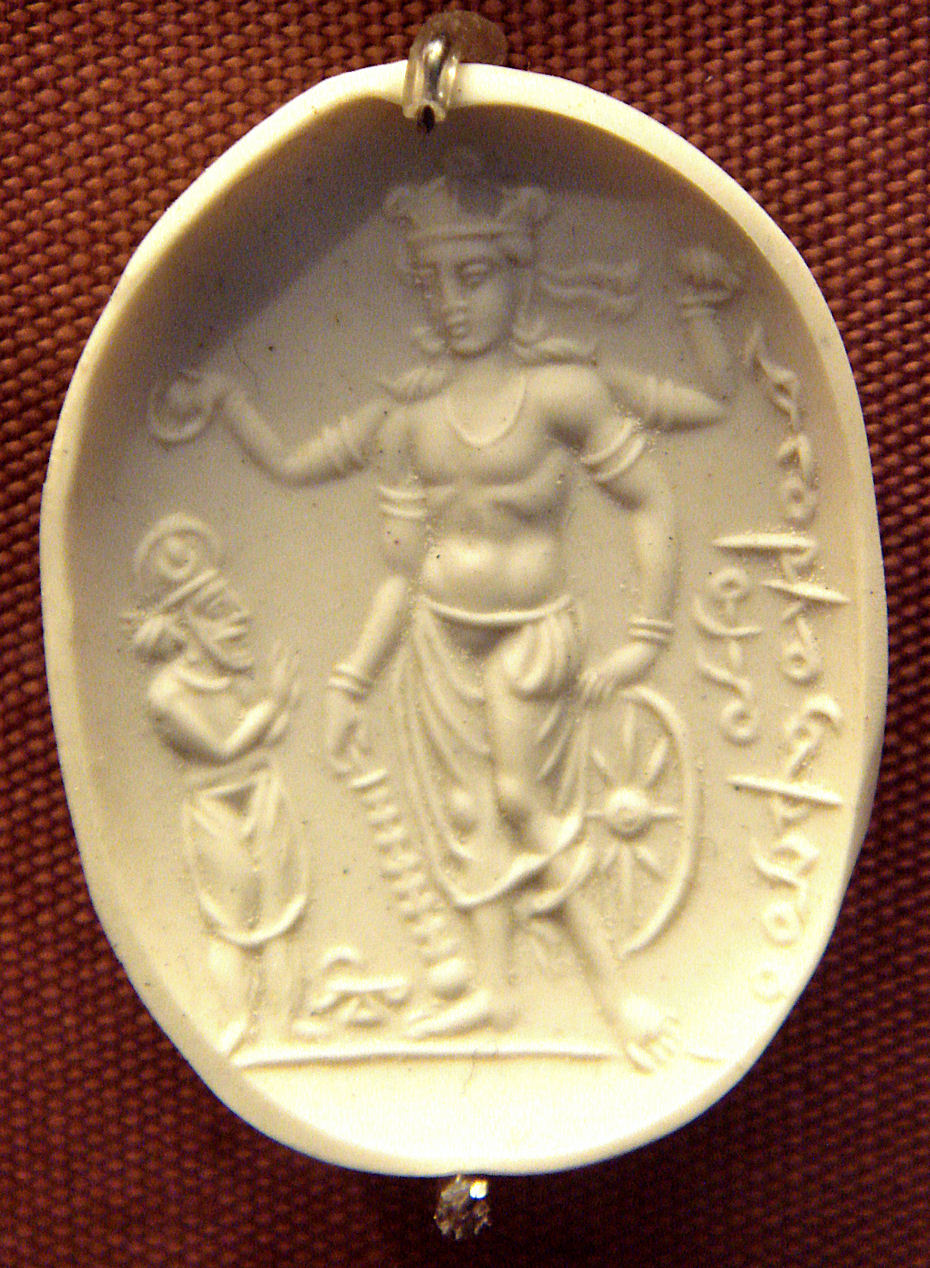
Vishnu Nicolo Seal: Kushano-Sasanian or Kidarite prince worshipping Vishnu or Vāsudeva, with Bactrian inscription. Found in Khyber Pakhtunkhwa, Pakistan. 4th century CE. British Museum.

The example of Sassanid art was influential on Kushan art, and this influence remained active for several centuries in the northwest South Asia. Plates seemingly belonging to the art of the Kushano-Sasanians have also been found in Northern Wei tombs in China, such as a plate depicting a boar hunt found in the 504 CE tomb of Feng Hetu.

== Main Kushano-Sassanid rulers ==
The following Kushanshahs were:

- Ardashir I Kushanshah (230–245)
- Peroz I Kushanshah (245–275)
- Hormizd I Kushanshah (275–300)
- Hormizd II Kushanshah (300–303)
- Peroz II Kushanshah (303–330)
- Varahran Kushanshah (330–365)

== See also ==
- Indo-Parthian

== Sources ==
- Cribb, Joe (2018). Rienjang, Wannaporn; Stewart, Peter (eds.). Problems of Chronology in Gandhāran Art: Proceedings of the First International Workshop of the Gandhāra Connections Project, University of Oxford, 23rd-24th March, 2017. University of Oxford The Classical Art Research Centre Archaeopress. ISBN 978-1-78491-855-2.
- Cribb, Joe (2010). Alram, M. (ed.). "The Kidarites, the numismatic evidence.pdf". Coins, Art and Chronology Ii, Edited by M. Alram et al. Coins, Art and Chronology II: 91–146.
- Dani, A.H.; Litvinsky, B.A. (2006). "The Kushano-Sasanian kingdom". In Litvinsky, B. A.; Guand-Da, Zhang; Samghabadi, R. Shabani (eds.). History of Civilizations of Central Asia. Vol. III: The crossroads of civilizations: A.D. 250 to 750. UNESCO. pp. 103–118. ISBN 978-9231032110.
- Daryaee, Touraj; Rezakhani, Khodadad (2017a). "The Sasanian Empire". In Daryaee, Touraj (ed.). King of the Seven Climes: A History of the Ancient Iranian World (3000 BCE - 651 CE). UCI Jordan Center for Persian Studies. pp. 1–236. ISBN 978-0-692-86440-1.
- Payne, Richard (2016). "The Making of Turan: The Fall and Transformation of the Iranian East in Late Antiquity". Journal of Late Antiquity. 9. Baltimore: Johns Hopkins University Press: 4–41. doi:10.1353/jla.2016.0011. S2CID 156673274.
- Rapp, Stephen H. (2014). The Sasanian World through Georgian Eyes: Caucasia and the Iranian Commonwealth in Late Antique Georgian Literature. London: Ashgate Publishing, Ltd. ISBN 978-1-4724-2552-2.
- Rezakhani, Khodadad (2017b). "East Iran in Late Antiquity". ReOrienting the Sasanians: East Iran in Late Antiquity. Edinburgh University Press. pp. 1–256. ISBN 978-1-4744-0030-5. JSTOR 10.3366/j.ctt1g04zr8. (registration required)
- Rypka, Jan; Jahn, Karl (1968). History of Iranian literature. D. Reidel. ISBN 9789401034791.
- Sastri, Nilakanta (1957). A Comprehensive History of India: The Mauryas & Satavahanas. Orient Longmans. p. 246. ISBN 9788170070030.
- Vaissière, Étienne de La (2016). "Kushanshahs i. History". Encyclopaedia Iranica.
- Wiesehöfer, Joseph (1986). "Ardašīr I i. History". Encyclopaedia Iranica, Vol. II, Fasc. 4. pp. 371–376.

Timeline and cultural period	Indus plain (Punjab-Sapta Sindhu-Gujarat)	Gangetic Plain			Central India	Southern India
Timeline and cultural period	Indus plain (Punjab-Sapta Sindhu-Gujarat)	Upper Gangetic Plain (Ganga-Yamuna doab)	Middle Gangetic Plain	Lower Gangetic Plain	Central India	Southern India
IRON AGE
Culture	Late Vedic Period	Late Vedic Period; Painted Grey Ware culture	Late Vedic Period; Northern Black Polished Ware		Pre-history	
6th century BCE	Gandhara	Kuru-Panchala	Magadha		Adivasi (tribes)	Assaka
Culture	Persian-Greek influences	"Second Urbanisation"; Rise of Shramana movements Jainism - Buddhism - Ājīvika - Yoga			Pre-history	
5th century BCE	(Persian conquests)		Shaishunaga dynasty		Adivasi (tribes)	Assaka
4th century BCE	(Greek conquests)	Nanda empire				
HISTORICAL AGE
Culture	Spread of Buddhism				Pre-history	
3rd century BCE	Maurya Empire					Satavahana dynasty Sangam period (300 BCE – 200 CE); Early Cholas; Early Pandyan kingdom Cheras
Culture	Preclassical Hinduism (Note: Michaels (2004) p.39) - "Hindu Synthesis" (Note: Hiltebeitel (2002)) (ca. 200 BCE - 300 CE) (Note: Michaels (2004) p.39) (Note: Hiltebeitel (2002)); Epics - Puranas - Ramayana - Mahabharata - Bhagavad Gita - Brahma Sutras - Smarta Tradition; Mahayana Buddhism					
2nd century BCE	Indo-Greek Kingdom		Shunga Empire; Maha-Meghavahana Dynasty			Satavahana dynasty Sangam period (300 BCE – 200 CE); Early Cholas; Early Pandyan kingdom Cheras
1st century BCE	Indo-Greek Kingdom		Shunga Empire; Maha-Meghavahana Dynasty			Satavahana dynasty Sangam period (300 BCE – 200 CE); Early Cholas; Early Pandyan kingdom Cheras
1st century CE	Indo-Scythians; Indo-Parthians		Kuninda Kingdom			Satavahana dynasty Sangam period (300 BCE – 200 CE); Early Cholas; Early Pandyan kingdom Cheras
2nd century	Kushan Empire					Satavahana dynasty Sangam period (300 BCE – 200 CE); Early Cholas; Early Pandyan kingdom Cheras
3rd century	Kushano-Sasanian Kingdom; Western Satraps	Kushan Empire		Kamarupa kingdom	Adivasi (tribes)	Satavahana dynasty Sangam period (300 BCE – 200 CE); Early Cholas; Early Pandyan kingdom Cheras
Culture	"Golden Age of Hinduism"(ca. CE 320-650) (Note: Michaels (2004) p.40); Puranas - Kural; Co-existence of Hinduism and Buddhism					
4th century	Kidarites	Gupta Empire; Varman dynasty				Andhra Ikshvakus; Kalabhra dynasty Kadamba Dynasty; Western Ganga Dynasty
5th century	Hephthalite Empire	Alchon Huns				Vishnukundina; Kalabhra dynasty
6th century	Nezak Huns; Kabul Shahi; Maitraka				Adivasi (tribes)	Vishnukundina; Badami Chalukyas; Kalabhra dynasty
Culture	Late-Classical Hinduism (ca. CE 650-1100) (Note: Michaels (2004) p.41); Advaita Vedanta - Tantra; Decline of Buddhism in India					
7th century	Indo-Sassanids		Vakataka dynasty Empire of Harsha	Mlechchha dynasty	Adivasi (tribes)	Badami Chalukyas; Eastern Chalukyas; Pandyan kingdom (revival); Pallava
7th century	Karkota dynasty				Adivasi (tribes)	
8th century	Kabul Shahi	Pala Empire			Adivasi (tribes)	Eastern Chalukyas; Pandyan kingdom Kalachuri
9th century	Gurjara-Pratihara				Adivasi (tribes)	Rashtrakuta Empire; Eastern Chalukyas; Pandyan kingdom Medieval Cholas; Chera Perumals of Makkotai
10th century	Ghaznavids			Pala dynasty Kamboja-Pala dynasty	Adivasi (tribes)	Kalyani Chalukyas; Eastern Chalukyas; Medieval Cholas; Chera Perumals of Makkotai; Rashtrakuta
References and sources for table References Sources: Flood, Gavin D. (1996), An Introduction to Hinduism, Cambridge University Press; Hiltebeitel, Alf (2002), Hinduism. In: Joseph Kitagawa, "The Religious Traditions of Asia: Religion, History, and Culture", Routledge; Michaels, Axel (2004), Hinduism. Past and present, Princeton, New Jersey: Princeton University Press
