= Indian Christian Day =

Christian Event

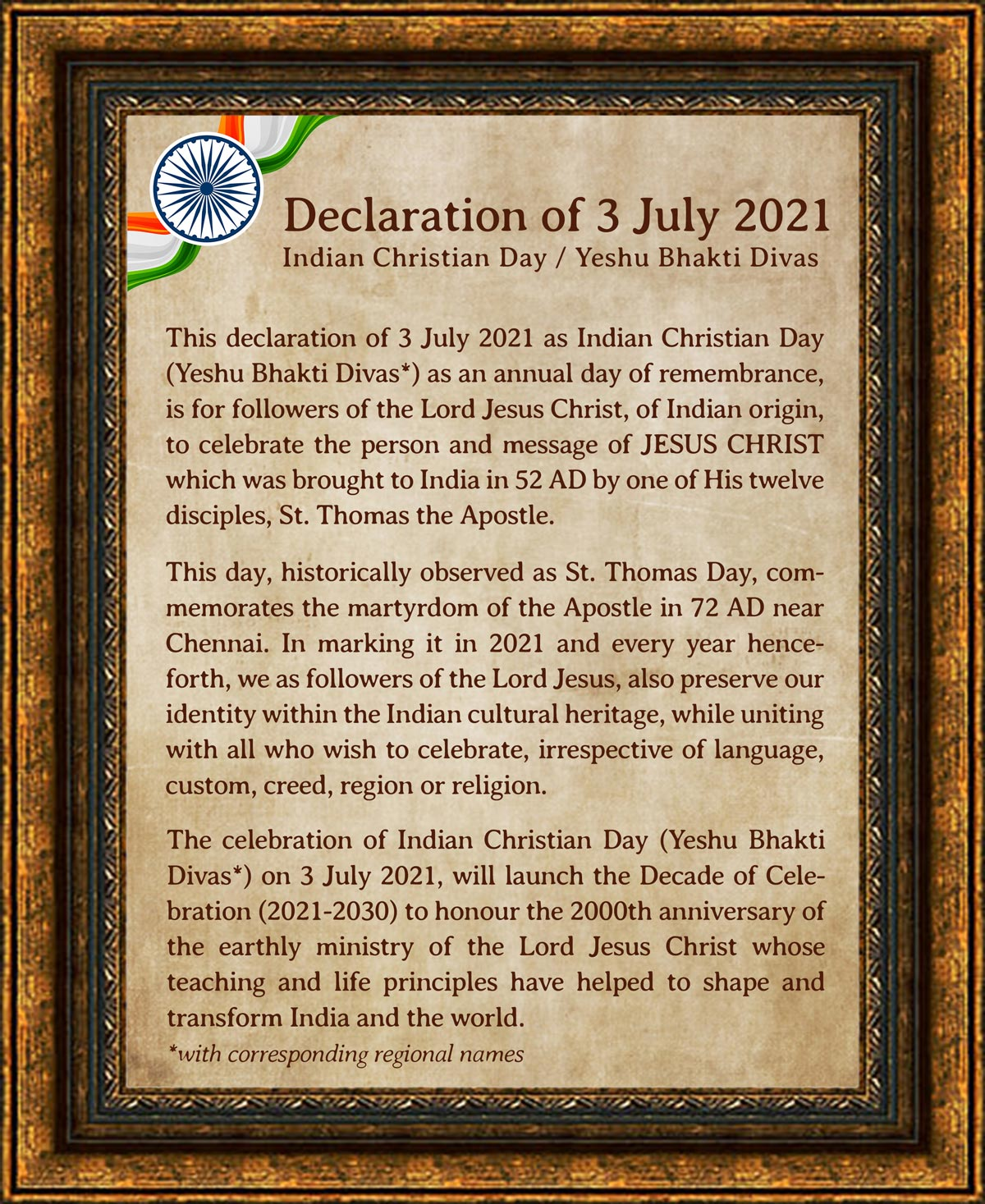

Indian Christian Day or Yeshu Bhakti Divas is an annual day of celebration on July 3 in India to celebrate the person and message of Jesus Christ, which was brought to India in 52 AD by St. Thomas the Apostle. This day of remembrance commemorates the nearly 2,000 years of rich Christian history, and the contributions of the Christian faith to India's culture, society, and nation-building.

== The declaration ==
The declaration of 3 July 2021 as Indian Christian Day as an annual day of remembrance, is for Indian followers of Jesus to celebrate the person and message of Christ which was brought to India in 52 AD by his disciple, St. Thomas the Apostle.

This day, historically observed as St. Thomas Day, commemorates the martyrdom of the apostle in 72 AD near Chennai, India. In marking it in 2021 and every year henceforth, followers of Jesus intend to preserve identity within the Indian cultural heritage, while uniting with all who wish to celebrate, irrespective of language, custom, creed, region or religion.

The celebration of Indian Christian Day on 3 July 2021, launched a decade of celebration (2021–2030) to honor the 2000th anniversary of the earthly ministry of Jesus Christ, whose teaching and life principles have helped to shape and transform India and the world.

== History ==
Historical records indicate that each of the eleven remaining Apostles of Jesus chose to go to different regions of the known world after the Ascension of Christ to tell the Jewish diaspora about Jesus. St. Thomas traveled to the region of India. He is first believed to have reached the kingdom of Parthia, an Indo-Persian kingdom with Taxila as the capital.

Since the original mandate of the Lord Jesus Christ to the Apostles was to tell the entire world (Matt 28:19,20 Mark 16:15,16 Luke 24:46,47 Acts 1:8) - not just the Jewish diaspora - about salvation through the Lord Jesus Christ, Thomas the Apostle obeyed by teaching Christ to non-Jewish populations in the region of far east Asia.

Records indicate that one of those who accepted the teachings of Thomas during his first visit was an Indo-Parthian King called Gondophares I (19 - 46 AD). Because of political instability and the constant threat of wars against Gondophares, Thomas decided to return to Damascus soon after.

A few years later in 52 AD, Thomas hitched a ride on a merchant boat that sailed to Muziris possibly from one of ports in the Arabian Peninsula. Muziris used to be a major port in the Chera Kingdom on the West Coast of India. It was located in the modern Indian state of Kerala. This region was known as Tamilagam during the 1st century AD.

In addition to evangelizing the Jewish traders across the region, Thomas had gained a great following among the native people across Tamilagam. He had established several communities of followers among local Dravidian people there.

A few years later, Thomas reached the Eastern shores of India. There too, he established large communities of followers though those communities have disappeared from that region for reasons yet to be documented.

Thomas was finally killed in 72 AD in a location now known as Saint Thomas Mount near the modern-day city of Chennai, India. His body was buried in a small church a few miles away at a place called Mylapore. This location of Mylapore later came to be known as Santhome.

Historical records show that a request was received during the 3rd century AD from the Patriarchate of Edessa to re-locate the remains of Apostle Thomas from Mylapore. The request came through a Guishuang king. The name of the king is given as Bazodeos I (190 - 230 AD). King Bozodeos-I was referred to as Mazdai in Syriac text. In coins found to be from this period, his name is written as Misdeos or Misdeus or Bazodeo Koshano using Greek script.

Guishuang Empire was known across the Indus regions as the Kushan Empire and the King Bazodeos I was known as King Vasudeva I (190 - 230).

Records show that, the remains of the Apostle Thomas were brought in person by King Bozodeos I to Edessa as a mark of his respect for the Apostle. The church celebrates a feast on July 3, in honor of the Apostle and the family of the King Bazdeo I, who brought the remains to Edessa. Some records indicate that this event took place in 232 AD. However, there is some confusion about the year. If it was 232 AD, it must have been just two years after the king stepped down from the throne in favor of his successor, King Kanishka II.

== The Celebration ==
Both Christians of all denominations and non-Christians joined millions of people around the world to celebrate July 3, 2021 as Indian Christian Day for the first time.

All major denominations and independent church leaders in India along with millions of Christians and non-Christians joined the call to mark July 3, as Indian Christian Day. Cardinal Oswald Gracias, the President of the Catholic Bishops Conference of India, called the faithful across the denomination divides, through a video message, to join him in the inaugural celebration. The Bishops of the National Council of Churches of India, across the country joined the leaders of the Evangelical Fellowship of India, the Synod of the Indian Pentecostal Pastors, Church of North India, Church of South India, Syro-Malabar Church, Mar Thoma Church, Syro-Malankara Church, St. Thomas Evangelical Church, Baptist, Orthodox and Jacobite churches along with independent church organizations, to mark the day with speeches and prayers. The events were held using online platforms due to COVID-19 restrictions.
