= Hormizd II Kushanshah =

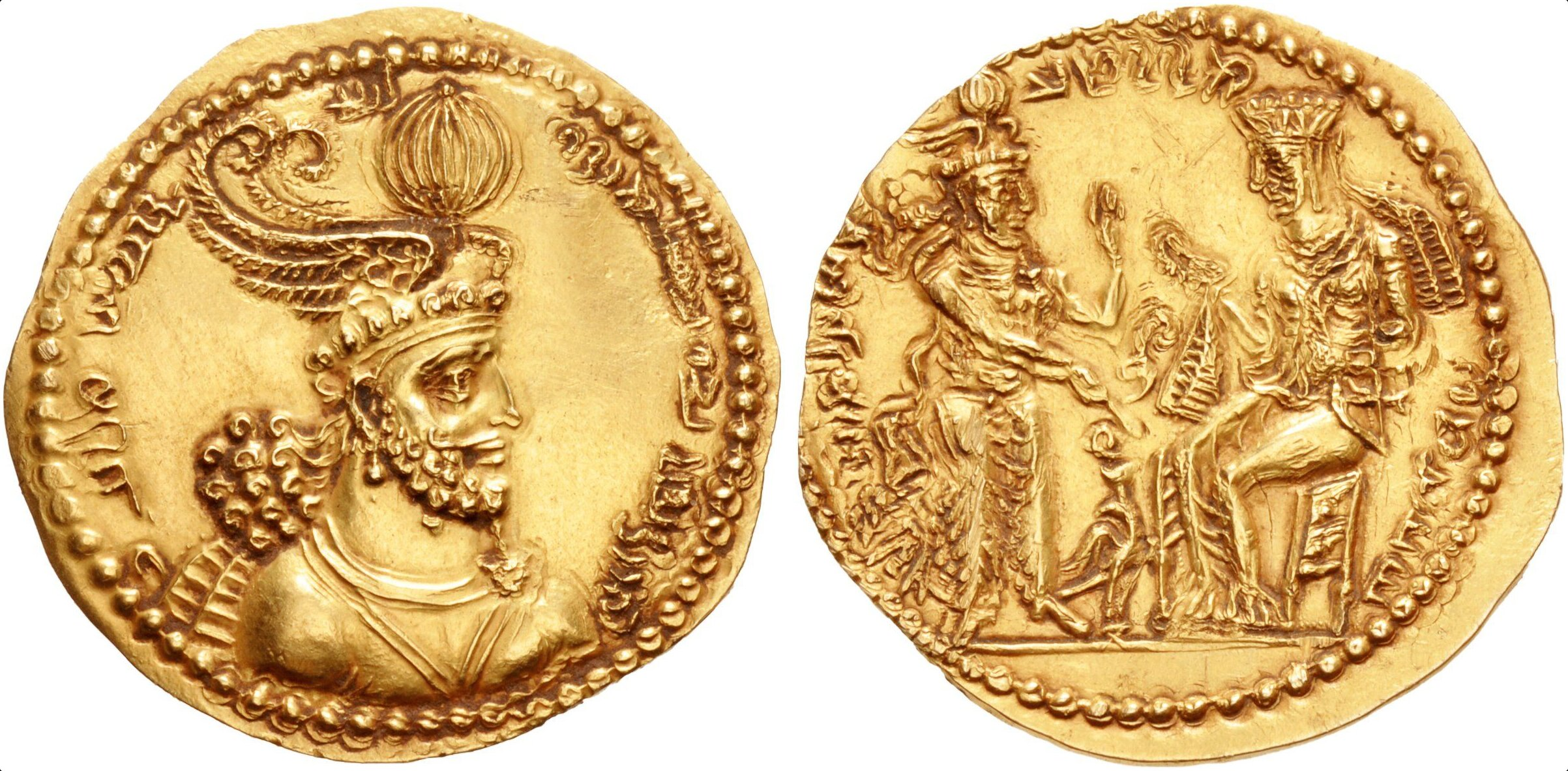
- Rare gold dinar of Hormizd II Kushanshah, Balkh mint, c. 300-303. The reverse depicts an investiture ceremony, where Hormizd II Kushanshah is given a diadem by the Zoroastrian goddess Anahita

Kushanshah of the Kushano-Sasanian Kingdom
- Reign: 300–303
- Predecessor: Hormizd I Kushanshah
- Successor: Peroz II Kushanshah
- Religion: Zoroastrianism

Hormizd II Kushanshah (also spelled Hormozd or Ohrmazd), was Kushanshah of the Kushano-Sasanian Kingdom from 300 to 303. Like his predecessors, he was, in effect a governor of the Sasanian Empire for the eastern regions of Marw, Tukharistan and Gandhara which had been captured following the defeat of the Kushan Empire in 230. Since the reign of his predecessor Hormizd I Kushanshah, copper drachms were minted with the names of two local governors, Meze and Kavad.

Hormizd II Kushanshah may have been same person as Hormizd II, the King of Kings of the Sasanian Empire from 303 to 309. They both minted coins where they were depicted with a winged crown, whilst on the reverse of the coins, which usually shows the traditional fire altar flanked by two attendants, also shows a head emerging from the fire, a typical Kushano-Sasanian design which first appears on Sasanian coins during the reign of Hormizd II.

== Sources ==
- Cribb, Joe (2018). Rienjang, Wannaporn; Stewart, Peter (eds.). Problems of Chronology in Gandhāran Art: Proceedings of the First International Workshop of the Gandhāra Connections Project, University of Oxford, 23rd–24th March, 2017. University of Oxford The Classical Art Research Centre Archaeopress. ISBN 978-1-78491-855-2.
- Rezakhani, Khodadad (2017). "East Iran in Late Antiquity". ReOrienting the Sasanians: East Iran in Late Antiquity. Edinburgh University Press. pp. 1–256. ISBN 978-1-4744-0030-5. JSTOR 10.3366/j.ctt1g04zr8. (registration required)

Preceded by Hormizd I Kushanshah	Kushanshah of the Kushano-Sasanian Kingdom; 300–303	Succeeded by Peroz II Kushanshah
