= Sasanian–Kushan Wars =

Series of wars between the Kushan and Sasanian empires

- Main polities in continental Asia circa 300 Map showing Asia at the aftermath of these wars
Date	AD III-IV cc
Location	Bactria, Sogdia, Gandhara
Result	Sasanian victory
Territorial changes	Sasanian conquest of much of the Kushan Empire including parts of Bactria, Sogdia, Gandhara, Khorasan and Chorasmia

Belligerents
Sasanian Empire	Kushan Empire

Commanders and leaders
Ardashir I; Shapur I	Vasudeva I (possibly); Kanishka II (possibly)

The Sasanian–Kushan Wars were a series of wars between the newly established Persian Sasanian Empire, under Ardashir I and later his successor Shapur I, against the declining Kushan Empire. These wars resulted in the eastward expansion of the Sasanians who conquered much of the Kushan territory including Bactria, Gandhara and Sogdia. The Sassanids, shortly after victory over the declining Parthian Empire, extended their dominion to most of former Parthian lands, including Bactria, during the reign of Ardashir I around 230 CE, then they further expanded to the eastern parts of their empire in what is now western Pakistan, at the expense of warring against the declining Kushan Empire, during the reign of his son Shapur I (240–270). Thus the Kushans lost their western territory (including Bactria and Gandhara) to the rule of Sassanid nobles, who eventually established their own states and were collectively referred to as Kushanshahs or "Kings of the Kushans". At their greatest extent, these Kushano-Sasanians also seem to have expanded eastwards all the way to Gandhara, however do not seem to have crossed the Indus River, since almost none of their coinage has been found in the city of Taxila, just beyond the Indus.

== Prelude ==
The Sasanian Empire under the rule of its 1st Shah, Ardashir I, conquered the declining Parthian Empire, which previously also lost major parts of its significant province of Bactria to the expanding Kushan Empire, led by its ruler Kaniska I. The Sasanians led by Ardashir I looked forward to further eastward and westward expansion including conquering the key provinces lost by the former Parthian Empire. Thus, eventually both empires came into conflict resulting in a series of wars that led to the collapse and decline of the Kushan Empire.

== Conflicts ==
=== First Sasanian-Kushan War ===
Most details of this conflict available are scarce, lost or obscure. However, all sources state that conflicts between the two empires seem to have started after Ardashir I's conquest of the 400-year-old Parthian Empire. Ardashir wanting to expand his new empire further east, came into conflict with the Kushans, details of this conflict are obscure, however according to most sources Ardashir conquered the provinces of Sakastan, Gorgan, Khorasan, Marw, Balkh and Chorasmia from the declining Kushan Empire. Later Sassanid inscriptions also claim the submission of the King of Kushan, to Ardashir, although based on numismatic evidence it is more likely that these actually submitted to Ardashir's son, the future Shapur I.

=== Second Sasanian-Kushan War ===
Ardashir was eventually succeeded by his son Shapur, who soon after the death of his father felt the need to reassert Sasanian authority in the East (perhaps due to the Kushan and Saka kings being lax in abiding their status as a tributary). Due to this, he marched East and annexed most of the Kushan lands, appointing his son Narseh as Sakanshah-king of the Sakas-in Sakastan. In 242 CE, Shapur conquered Chorasmia (possibly a client state or province of the Kushans). His relief in Rag-i-Bibi in present-day Afghanistan, confirms his empire stretching all the way to Peshawar. In Naqsh-e Rostam Shapur also claims to possess the territory of the Kushans (Kūšān šahr) as far as "Purushapura" (Peshawar), suggesting he conquered Bactria and areas as far as the Hindu-Kush or even south of it

I, the Mazda-worshipping lord, Shapur, king of kings of Iran and An-Iran... (I) am the Master of the Domain of Iran (Ērānšahr) and possess the territory of Persis, Parthian... Hindestan, the Domain of the Kushan up to the limits of Paškabur and up to Kash, Sughd, and Chachestan.

— Naqsh-e Rostam inscription of Shapur I

Thus, as a result of this war the Kushans lost control of most of their Northwestern provinces and were restricted to ruling parts of Northern India, eventually being subjugated by the Gupta Empire.

=== Third Sasanian-Kushan War ===
In the east around 350, Shapur II gained the upper hand against the Kushano-Sasanian Kingdom, who captured some territories against the Sasanians, and took control of large territories in areas now known as Afghanistan and Pakistan, possibly as a consequence of the destruction of the Kushano-Sasanians by the Chionites. The Kushano-Sasanian still ruled in the north. Important finds of Sasanian coinage beyond the Indus River in the city of Taxila only start with the reigns of Shapur II (r.309-379) and Shapur III (r.383-388), suggesting that the expansion of Sasanian control beyond the Indus was the result of the wars of Shapur II "with the Chionites and Kushans" in 350-358 as described by Ammianus Marcellinus.

== Aftermath ==
These wars resulted in further eastwards expansion of the Sasanians and demonstrated its military might in the East being as mighty as that in the West. Eventually the territories annexed by the Sasanians rebelled and broke away into a different kingdom, ruled by a different branch of the family, that would be known as the Kushano-Sasanian kingdom. These rulers would become known as the Kushanshahanshah ("King of kings of the Kushans"), and would maintain their rule until being conquered by another dynasty known as the Kidarites. The Kushan Empire continued as a remnant known as the "Little Kushans", based in the Punjab. Around 270 their territories on the Gangetic plain became independent under local dynasties such as the Yaudheyas. Then in the mid-4th century they were subjugated by the Gupta Empire under Samudragupta. In his inscription on the Allahabad pillar Samudragupta proclaims that the Dēvaputra-Shāhi-Shāhānushāhi (referring to the last Kushan rulers, being a deformation of the Kushan regnal titles Devaputra, Shao and Shaonanoshao: "Son of God, King, King of Kings") are now under his dominion, and that they were forced to "self-surrender, offering (their own) daughters in marriage and a request for the administration of their own districts and provinces". This suggests that by the time of the Allahabad inscription the Kushans still ruled in Punjab, but under the suzerainty of the Gupta Emperor.

== Sources ==
- Haug, Robert (2019). The Eastern Frontier: Limits of Empire in Late Antique and Early Medieval Central Asia. I.B. Tauris.
- Litvinsky, Boris Abramovich, ed. (1996). History of Civilizations of Central Asia. Volume III The crossroads of civilizations: A.D. 250 to 750. Paris: UNESCO. ISBN 9789231032110.
  - Dani, Ahmad Hasan; Litvinsky, Boris Abramovich; Zamir Safi, M. H. "Eastern Kushans, Kidarines in Gandhara and Kashmir, and Later Hephthalites". In Litvinsky (1996), pp. 163–184.
- Rezakhani, Khodadad (2017a). "From the Kushans to the Western Turks". In Daryaee, Touraj (ed.). King of the Seven Climes: A History of the Ancient Iranian World (3000 BCE – 651 CE). UCI Jordan Center for Persian Studies. pp. 199–227. ISBN 978-0-692-86440-1.
