= Buddha statue of Vasudeva I =

2nd century Buddha statue

Buddha statue of Vasudeva I
(220 CE)

Buddha statue of Vasudeva I, c. 220 CE, Mathura Museum.

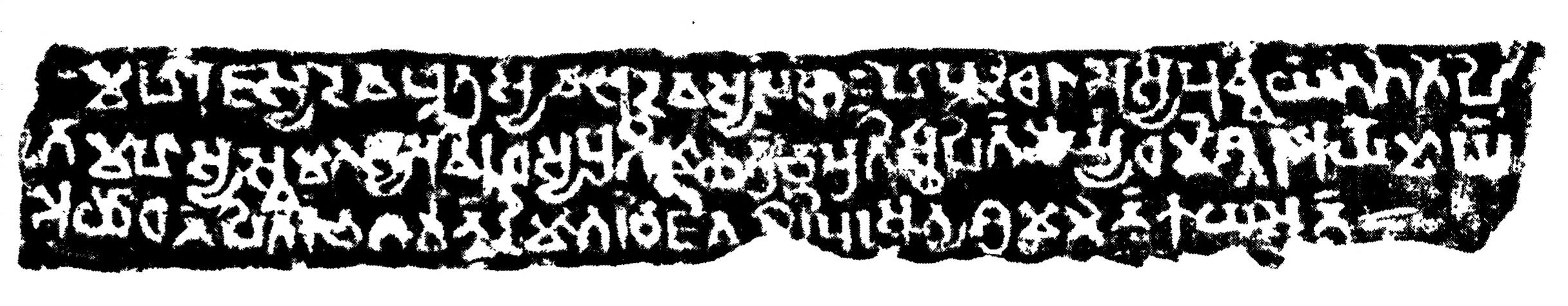
Buddha statue pedestal inscription "In the 93rd year" of "Great King, son of God, Vasudeva" ( Mahārājasya Devaputrasya Vāsudeva, from the start of the first line). Mathura Museum.

The Buddha statue of Vasudeva I is a fragment of a statue of the Buddha, belonging to the art of Mathura, and bearing an inscription in the name of the Kushan Empire emperor Vasudeva I (191–232 CE).

The inscription on the base of a Buddha statue states: "In the 93rd year of Maharaja Devaputra Vasudeva...", corresponding to c. 171 CE, or more probably 220 CE, with the more recent definition of the Kanishka era as starting in 127 CE (127+93=220). The complete inscription reads:

In the 93rd year of Maharaja Devaputra Vasudeva, in the 4th month of Hemanta as on the 25th day, an image of the Buddha, who has full grasp of knowledge and whose faith cannot be shaken, was set up along with a parasol by a Buddhist monk who was Kayastha (?) after paying due respect to his father Sarvanandi, mother Jivsri and Arya Dhana.

— Inscription on the Buddha statue of Vasudeva I.

The relatively peaceful reign of Vasudeva is marked by an important artistic production, in particular in the area of statuary. Several Buddhist statues are dated to the reign of Vasudeva, and are important markers for the chronology of Buddhist art. A partially preserved Sakyamuni statue, also from Mathura, has the date "Year 94", although without mentioning Vasudeva specifically.

The statue, located in the Mathura Museum, is an important example of the art of Mathura.

== See also ==
- Kushan art
