= Feng Hetu =

Chinese military official

Tomb of Feng Hetu
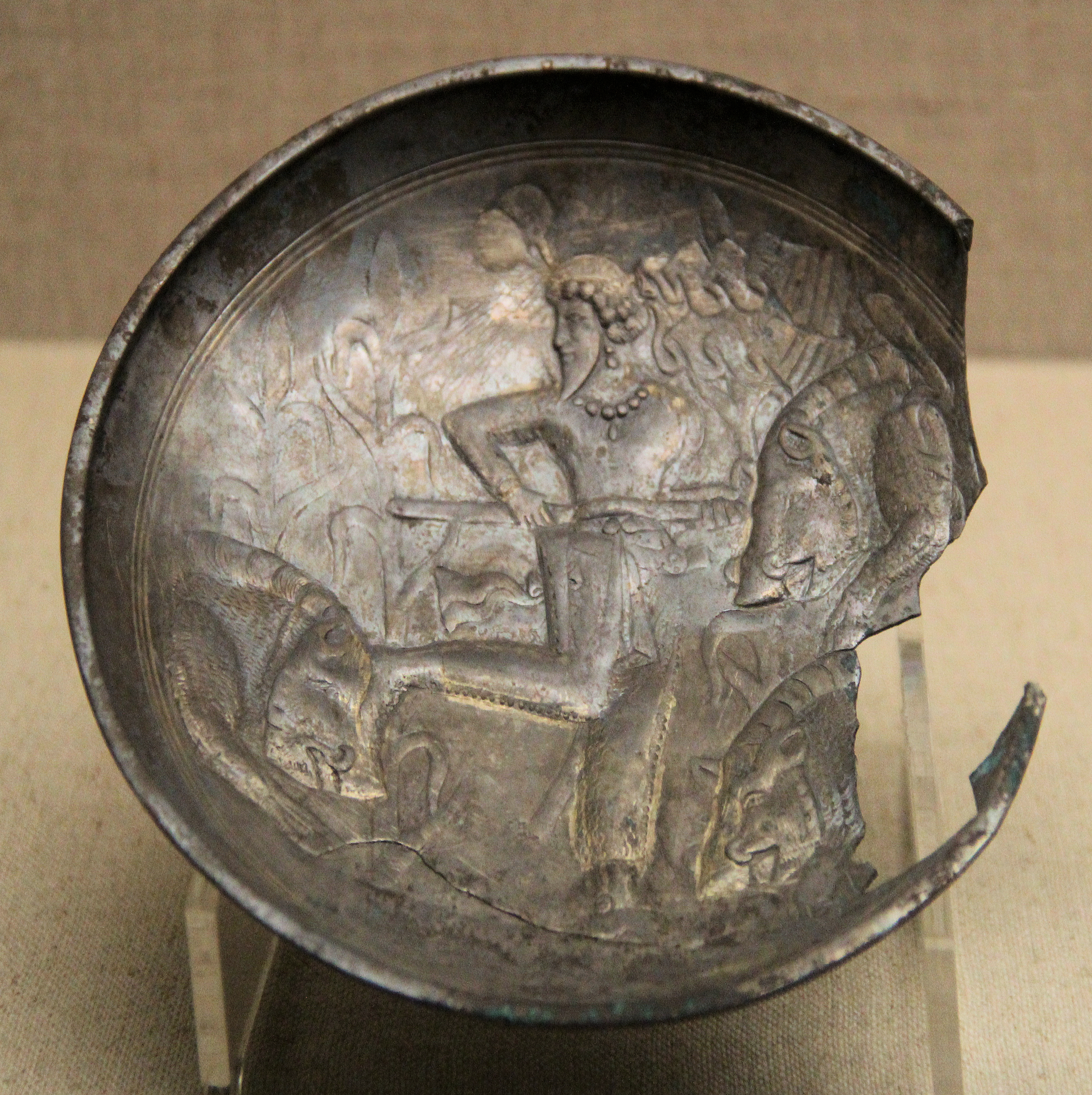
- A Sasanian-style plate with hunting scene, from the tomb of Feng Hetu. Shanxi Museum. It is dated the 3rd-4th century CE, and was probably manufactured in northern Afghanistan. The man spears a boar to the right, while holding back another with his right foot. It is highly similar to other known Sasanian plates.
- Created: 504 CE
- Discovered: Xiaozhan, Datong, Shanxi 40.098708°N 113.220612°E

Location

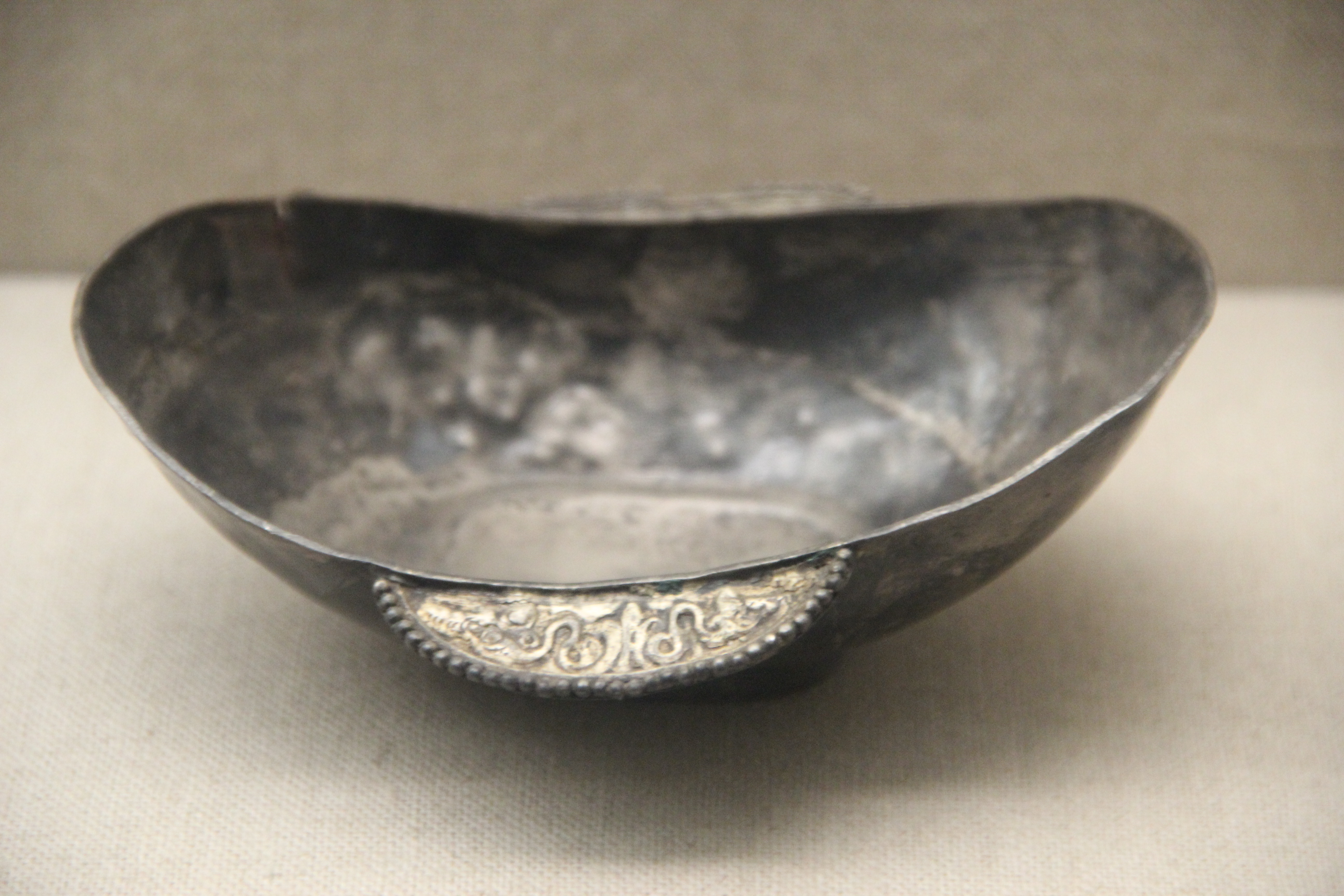
Another foreign silver vessel from the tomb of Feng Hetu. Shanxi Museum.

Feng Hetu (封和突 Fēng Hétū, 438-501 CE) was a Chinese military official and a minister of the Northern Wei dynasty. He probably was of Xianbei ethnicity.

His tomb was discovered partially destroyed in Xiaozhan village, west of Datong. It contained three silver vessels of foreign origin. One plate especially has Sasanian-style designs, and is thought to have been manufactured in Northern Afghanistan or Southern Turkmenistan. It is nearly identical in composition to another plate which has been found in Kabul. The plate is dated the 3rd-4th century CE, and probably belongs to the artistic production of the Kushano-Sasanians.

The tomb also had an epitaph, giving a summary account of the life of Feng Hetu. He died in Chang'an in 501, and was re-buried in his native Datong in Xiaozhan village (小站村) in 504. The epitaph reads:

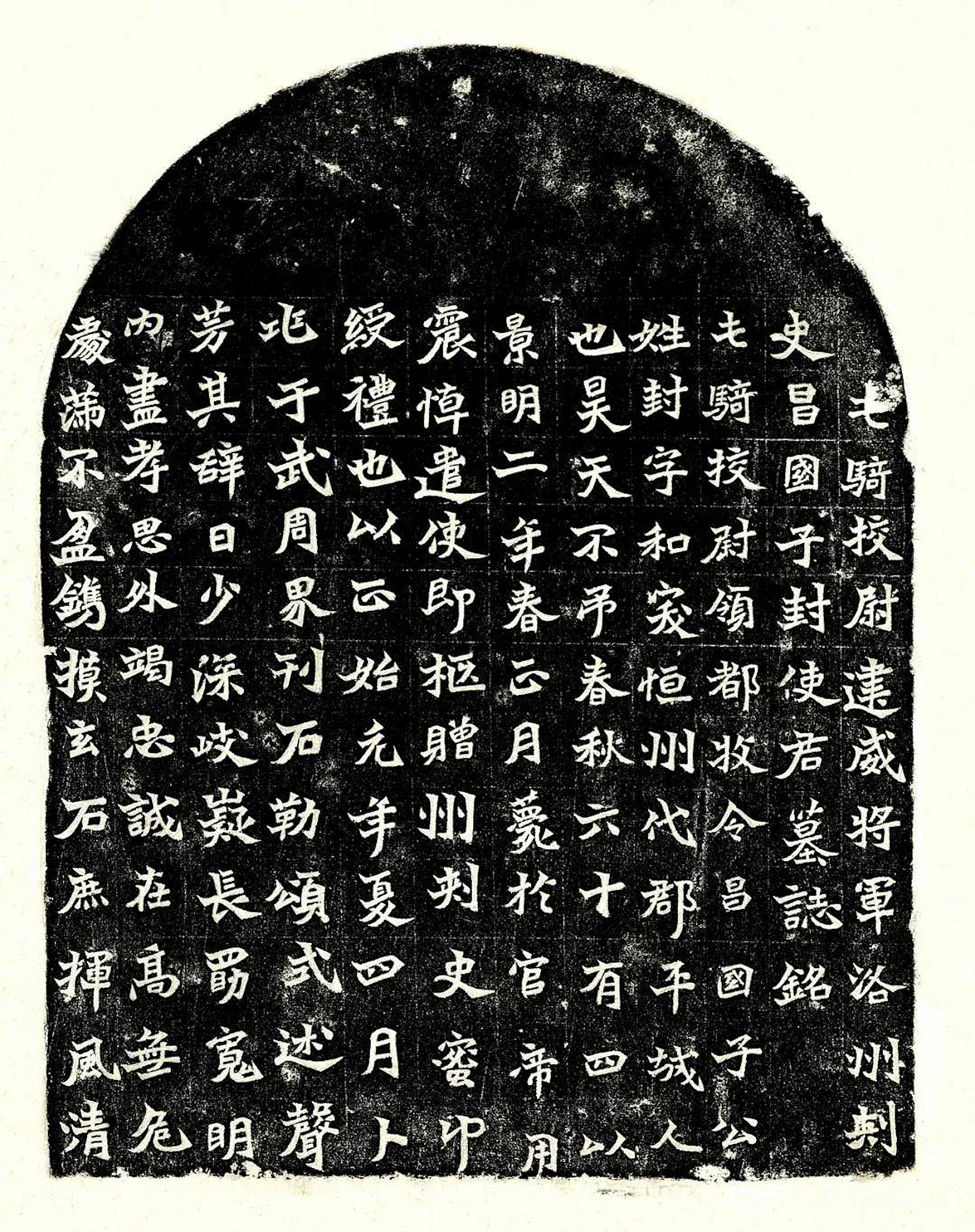
Epitaph of Feng Hetu

屯騎校尉建威將軍洛州刺/史昌國子封使君墓志銘/ 屯騎校尉、領都牧令、昌國子，公/ 姓封，字和突，恆州代郡平城人/ 也。昊天不弔，春秋六十有四，以/ 景明二年春正月薨於官。帝用/ 震悼，遣使即柩贈州刺史，蜜印/ 授，禮也。以正始元年夏四月卜/ 兆於武周界，刊石勒頌，式述聲/ 芳。其辭曰：少深岐嶷，長勗寬明。/ 內盡孝思，外竭忠誠。在高無危，/ 處滿不盈。鐫摸玄石，庶揮風清。

— Epitaph of Feng Hetu.

Northern Wei art came under influence of Indian and Central Asian traditions through the mean of trade routes. Most importantly for Chinese art history, the Wei rulers converted to Buddhism and became great patrons of Buddhist arts.

== See also ==
- Central Asian objects of Northern Wei tombs
