= Hormizd I Kushanshah =

Ruler of the Kushano-Sasanian Kingdom

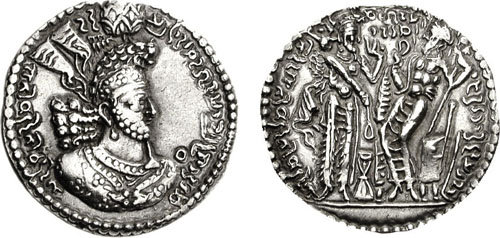
- Coin of Hormizd I Kushanshah, Marw mint

Kushanshah of the Kushano-Sasanian Kingdom
- Reign: 275–300
- Predecessor: Peroz I Kushanshah
- Successor: Hormizd II Kushanshah
- Died: 300
- Father: Bahram I
- Religion: Zoroastrianism

Hormizd I Kushanshah was Kushanshah of the Kushano-Sasanian Kingdom from 275 to 300. His reign was marked by his rebellion against his brother and suzerain the Sasanian King of Kings Bahram II (r. 274–293).

Hormizd I Kushanshah was notably the first Kushano-Sasanian ruler to claim the title of "Great Kushan King of Kings" instead of the traditional "Great Kushan King". This displays a noteworthy transition in Kushano-Sasanian ideology and self-perception and possibly a direct dispute with the ruling branch of the Sasanian family. By the time of Bahram II's death in 293, Hormizd I Kushanshah's rebellion had been suppressed; he continued to rule until his death in 300, and was succeeded by his namesake Hormizd II Kushanshah.

== Etymology ==
Hormizd (also spelled Ōhrmazd, Hormozd) is the Middle Persian version of the name of the supreme deity in Zoroastrianism, known in Avestan as Ahura Mazda. The Old Persian equivalent is Auramazdā, while the Greek transliteration is Hormisdas.

== Background ==
Like the previous Kushano-Sasanians, Hormizd I Kushanshah was, in effect, a governor of the eastern portion of the Sasanian Empire, which included the Tukharistan region, Kabulistan and Gandhara. The Kushano-Sasanians, in the same manner as the Kushan Empire, used the title of Kushanshah ("Kushan King"), thus demonstrating a continuum with their predecessors. Hormizd I Kushanshah was probably a son of the Sasanian king Bahram I (r. 271–274), who died in 274 and was succeeded by another son, Bahram II (r. 274–293). It was during the reign of his brother that Hormizd I Kushanshah choose to rebel.

== Reign ==
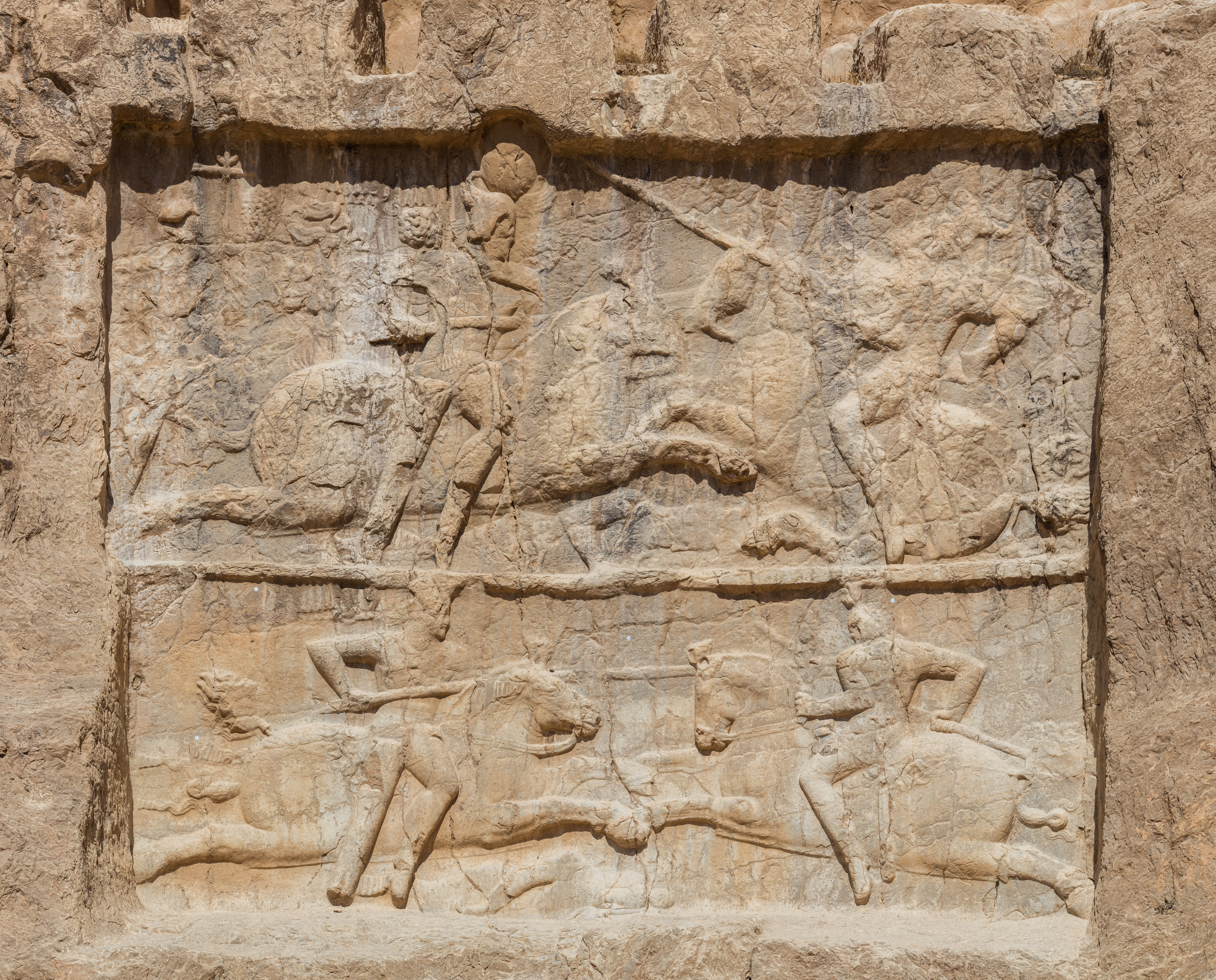
The victory of Bahram II (left) over Hormizd I Kushanshah (right) is depicted in the bottom panel at Naqsh-e Rustam (the top panel is the "victory" of Bahram II over Roman Emperor Carus).

Hormizd I Kushanshah was the first Kushano-Sasanian ruler to mint coins with the title of "Great Kushan King of Kings" instead of the traditional "Great Kushan King".The exact dates of Hormizd I Kushanshah’s reign remain uncertain and are primarily reconstructed through numismatic evidence rather than contemporary historical records. The Kushano-Sasanian king, now laying claims to the title of King of Kings, which had originally also been used by the Kushan Empire, displays a noteworthy transition in Kushano-Sasanian ideology and self-perception and possibly a direct dispute with the ruling branch of the Sasanian family.

Hormizd I Kushanshah was supported in his efforts by the Sakastanis, Gelae, and Kushans. Another revolt also occurred in Sakastan, led by Hormizd I Kushanshah's cousin Hormizd of Sakastan, who has been suggested to be the same person as him. However, according to Rezakhani, this proposal must now be disregarded. At the same time, a revolt led by a high-priest (mowbed) occurred in the province of Khuzestan, which was seized by the latter for a period.

Meanwhile, the Roman emperor Carus, hearing of the civil war occurring in the Sasanian Empire, chose to take advantage of the situation by making a campaign into the empire in 283. He invaded Mesopotamia while Bahram II was in the east, and even besieged the Sasanian capital of Ctesiphon without facing much fighting. The Sasanians, due to facing severe internal problems, were unable to mount an effective coordinated defense at the time; Carus and his army may have captured Ctesiphon. However, Carus shortly died afterwards, reportedly being struck by lightning. The Roman army as a result withdrew, and Mesopotamia was re-conquered by the Sasanians. The following year, Bahram II made peace with the Romans, now ruled by Diocletian, who was faced with internal issues of his own.

By the time of Bahram II's death in 293, the revolts in the east had been suppressed, with his son and heir Bahram III being appointed the governor of Sakastan, receiving the title of sakanshah ("King of the Saka"). Hormizd I Kushanshah ruled till 300, and was succeeded by his namesake Hormizd II Kushanshah.

== Coinage ==
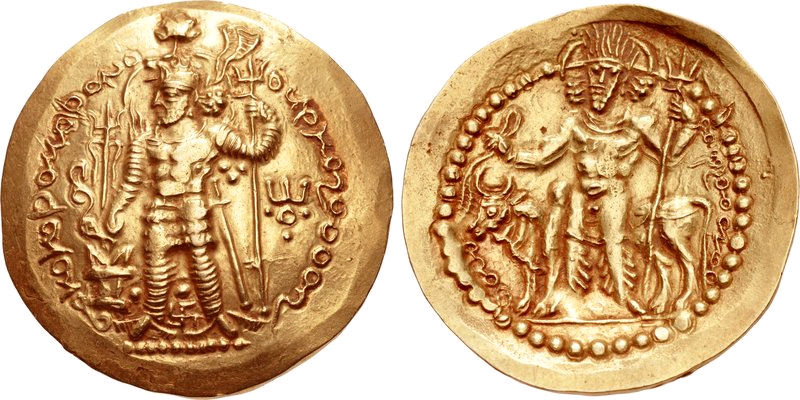
Gold coin of Hormizd I Kushanshah, imitating the Kushan coins, with the deity Oesho on the reverse.

Coins of Hormizd I Kushanshah were minted at Kabul, Balkh, Herat, and Marw. The synchronicity of the Kushano-Sasanians with the rulers of the Kushan Empire is rather well established, as a large quantity of the early copper coins of Hormizd I Kushanshah from the south of the Hindu-Kush were overstruck by the Kushan Emperor Vasudeva II (r. 275–300). Some of Hormizd I Kushanshah's coins imitate Kushan coinage, with king standing in Kushan military dress on the obverse, and the deity Oesho on the reverse. Other coins however follow more closely the Sasanian pattern, with him being portrayed in the Sasanian style, and with fire altar or deity on the reverse.

On the obverse of the coins, Hormizd I Kushanshah is wearing a crown shaped as the head of a lion. The lion was a symbol of Nana, the eastern counterpart to Anahita, the goddess of fertility, and was a derivative of the Mesopotamian goddess Inanna. Lions, along with leopards and cats were regarded as evil animals in Zoroastrianism, and were thus disfavoured. Nevertheless, the lion may have been chosen as the symbol of Nana/Anahita by the Kushano-Sasanians, regardless of its unfavorable implication.

A couple of overstrikes on coins of Hormizd I by the Parataraja ruler Datayola are known.

== Sources ==
- Curtis, Vesta Sarkhosh (2007). "Religious iconography on ancient Iranian coins". Journal of Late Antiquity. London: 413–434.
- Daryaee, Touraj (2014). Sasanian Persia: The Rise and Fall of an Empire. I.B.Tauris. pp. 1–240. ISBN 978-0857716668.
- Potter, David (2013). Constantine the Emperor. Oxford University Press. ISBN 978-0199755868.
- Frye, Richard Nelson (1984). The History of Ancient Iran. C.H.Beck. pp. 1–411. ISBN 9783406093975. "The history of ancient iran."
- Shahbazi, A. Shapur (1988). "Bahrām II". Encyclopaedia Iranica, Vol. III, Fasc. 5. pp. 514–522.
- Frye, R. N. (1983), "Chapter 4", The political history of Iran under the Sasanians, The Cambridge History of Iran, vol. 3, Cambridge University Press, ISBN 978-0-521-20092-9
- Shahbazi, A. Shapur (2004). "Hormozd Kusansah". Encyclopaedia Iranica.
- Rezakhani, Khodadad (2017). ReOrienting the Sasanians: East Iran in Late Antiquity. Edinburgh University Press. pp. 1–256. ISBN 9781474400305.
- Cribb, Joe (2018). Problems of Chronology in Gandhāran Art: Proceedings of the First International Workshop of the Gandhāra Connections Project, University of Oxford, 23rd–24th March, 2017. University of Oxford The Classical Art Research Centre Archaeopress.
- Shayegan, M. Rahim (2004). "Hormozd I". Encyclopaedia Iranica, Vol. XII, Fasc. 5. pp. 462–464.
- Vevaina, Yuhan; Canepa, Matthew (2018). "Ohrmazd". In Nicholson, Oliver (ed.). The Oxford Dictionary of Late Antiquity. Oxford: Oxford University Press. ISBN 978-0-19-866277-8.
- Payne, Richard (2016). "The Making of Turan: The Fall and Transformation of the Iranian East in Late Antiquity". Journal of Late Antiquity. 9. Baltimore: Johns Hopkins University Press: 4–41. doi:10.1353/jla.2016.0011. S2CID 156673274.

Preceded by Peroz I Kushanshah	Kushanshah of the Kushano-Sasanian Kingdom; 275–300	Succeeded by Hormizd II Kushanshah
