= Vasudeva I =

Kushan emperor from c.191 to c.232

- Kushan emperor
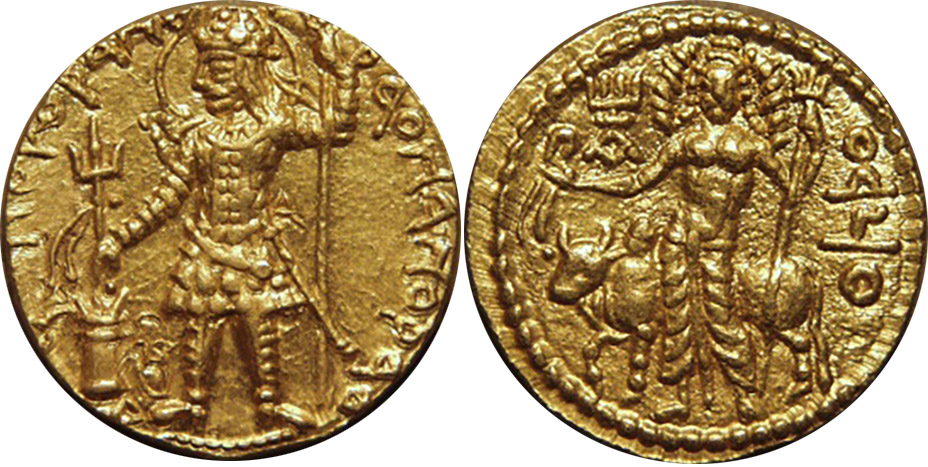
- Gold coin of Vasudeva I or II. Obv: Vasudeva in tall helmet, holding a scepter, and making an offering over an altar. Legend in Kushan language and Greek script (with the Kushan letter Ϸ "sh"): ϷΑΟΝΑΝΟϷΑΟ ΒΑΖΟΔΗΟ ΚΟϷΑΝΟ ("Shaonanoshao Bazodeo Koshano"): "King of kings, Vasudeva the Kushan". Rev: ΟΗϷΟ (oesho), Hindu god Shiva, holding a trisula scepter, with the bull Nandi. Monogram (tamgha) to the left.
- Reign: 191–232 CE
- Coronation: 191 CE
- Predecessor: Huvishka
- Successor: Kanishka II
- Born: 139 AD; Kabul
- Died: 232 AD (91 years); Ludhiana
- Burial: 232 AD; Leh
- Spouse: Unknown
- Issue: Kanishka III Vashishka
Names
- Vasudeva I
- Dynasty: Kushan
- Father: Kanishka
- Mother: unknown
- Religion: Hinduism

Location of the inscriptions mentioning Vasudeva I as ruler.

Vāsudeva I (Kushano Bactrian: Βαζοδηο Bazodeo; Middle Brahmi: 𑀯𑀸𑀲𑀼𑀤𑁂𑀯; Vā-su-de-va, Chinese: 波調 Bodiao; fl. 200 CE) was a Kushan emperor, last of the "Great Kushans." Named inscriptions dating from year 64 to 98 of Kanishka's era suggest his reign extended from at least 191 to 232 CE. He ruled in Northern India and Central Asia, where he minted coins in the city of Balkh (Bactria). He probably had to deal with the rise of the Sasanians and the first incursions of the Kushano-Sasanians in the northwest of his territory.

The last named inscription of his predecessor, Huvishka, was in the year 60 of the Kanishka era (187 CE), and the Chinese evidence suggests he was still ruling as late as 229 CE.

His name "Vāsudeva", is that of the popular Hindu God Vāsudeva, which refers to Krishna, and he was the first Kushan king to be named after the Indian God. He converted to Hinduism during his reign. His name reinforces the notion that his center of power was in Mathura.

== Contacts with China ==
In the Chinese historical chronicle Records of the Three Kingdoms, he is recorded to have sent tribute to Emperor Ming of Wei in 229 CE (3rd year of Taihe 太和):

King of the Greater Yuezhi, Bodiao (波調) (Vāsudeva), sent his envoy to present tribute and His Majesty granted him a title of "King of the Greater Yuezhi Intimate with Wei (魏)".

He is the last Kushan ruler to be mentioned in Chinese sources. His rule corresponds to the retreat of Chinese power from Central Asia, and it is thought that Vasudeva may have filled the power vacuum in that area. The great expansion of the Dharmaguptaka Buddhist group in Central Asia during this period has also been related to this event.

== Coinage ==
The coinage of Vasudeva consisted in gold dinars and quarter dinars, as well as copper coins. Vasudeva almost entirely removed the pantheon of deities displayed in the coinage of Kanishka and Huvishka. Apart from a few coins with the effigies of Mao and Nana, all of Vasudeva's coins feature Oesho on the reverse, who is generally identified as Shiva. On the obverse, Vasudeva restored the royal imagery of Kanishka, with the standing, making a sacrifice over an altar, although he holds a trident rather than Kanishka's spear and he appears nimbate. Another trident is sometimes also added over the small sacrificial altar. At the end of his rule, Vasudeva introduced the nandipada symbol on his coinage.

== Sassanid invasion in the northwest ==
Vasudeva I was the last great Kushan emperor, and the end of his rule coincides with the invasion of the Sassanians as far as northwestern India, and the establishment of the Indo-Sassanians or Kushanshahs from around 240 CE. Vasudeva I may have lost the territory of Bactria with its capital in Balkh to Ardashir I Kushanshah. Thereafter, Kushan rule would be restricted to their eastern territories, in western and central Punjab.

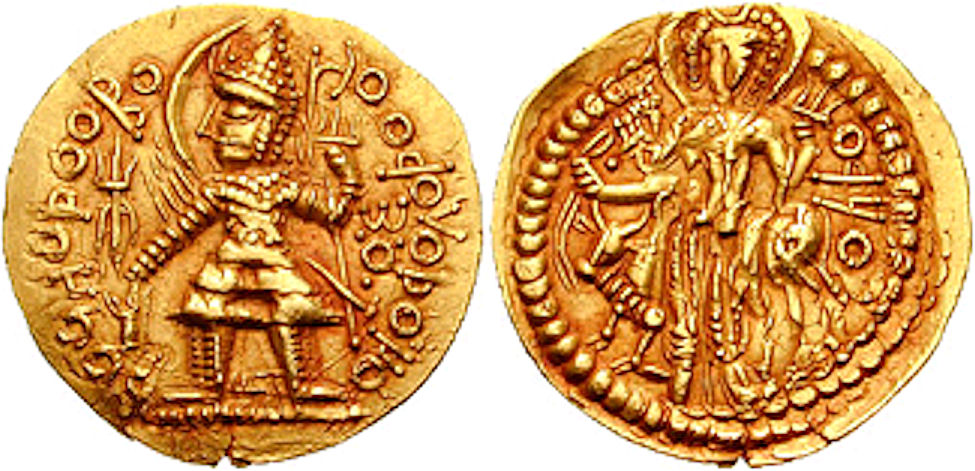
An imitation of a coin of Vasudeva I, by the Kushano-Sasanian ruler Ardashir I Kushanshah, c. 230 – c. 245 CE.

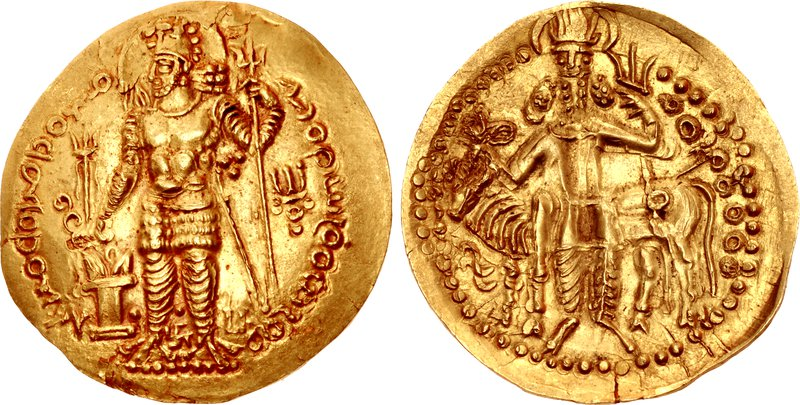
Gold coin of Peroz I Kushanshah (246-275 CE), imitating the design of Vasudeva I, minted at Balkh.

== Statuary ==
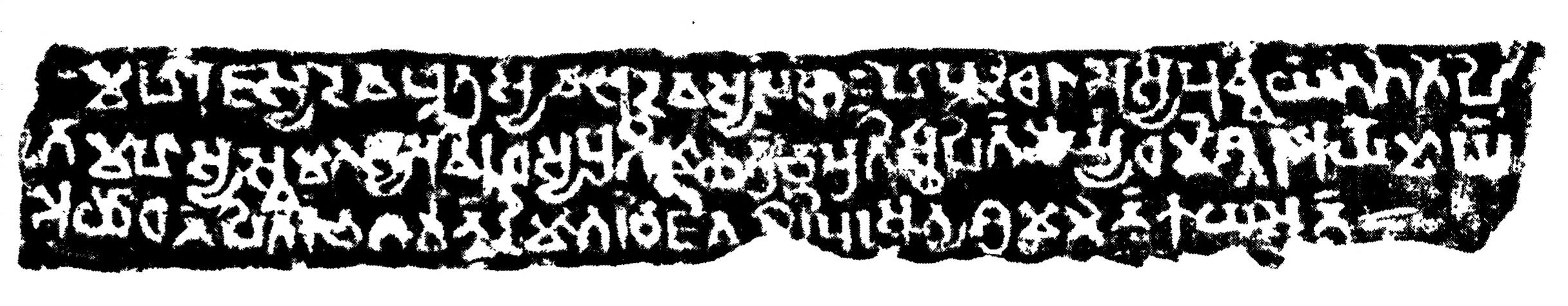
Buddha statue of Vasudeva I, pedestal inscription: "In the 93rd year" (𑀲𑀁𑁣𑁔) of "Great King, son of God, Vasudeva" ( Mahārājasya Devaputrasya Vāsudeva, from the start of the first line). Mathura Museum. Photograph of the pedestal.

The relatively peaceful reign of Vasudeva is marked by an important artistic production, in particular in the area of statuary. Several Buddhist statues are dated to the reign of Vasudeva, and are important markers for the chronology of Buddhist art.

An inscription on the base of the Buddha statue of Vasudeva I is also known from the Mathura Museum: "In the 93rd year of Maharaja Devaputra Vasudeva...", probably corresponding to c. 171 CE, or 220 CE with the more recent definition of the Kanishka era as starting in 127 CE. A partially preserved Sakyamuni statue, also from Mathura, has the date "Year 94", although without mentioning Vasudeva specifically.

Dedications in the name of Vasudeva, with dates, also appear on Jain statuary discovered in Mathura.

Statuary dated to the reign of Vasudeva I
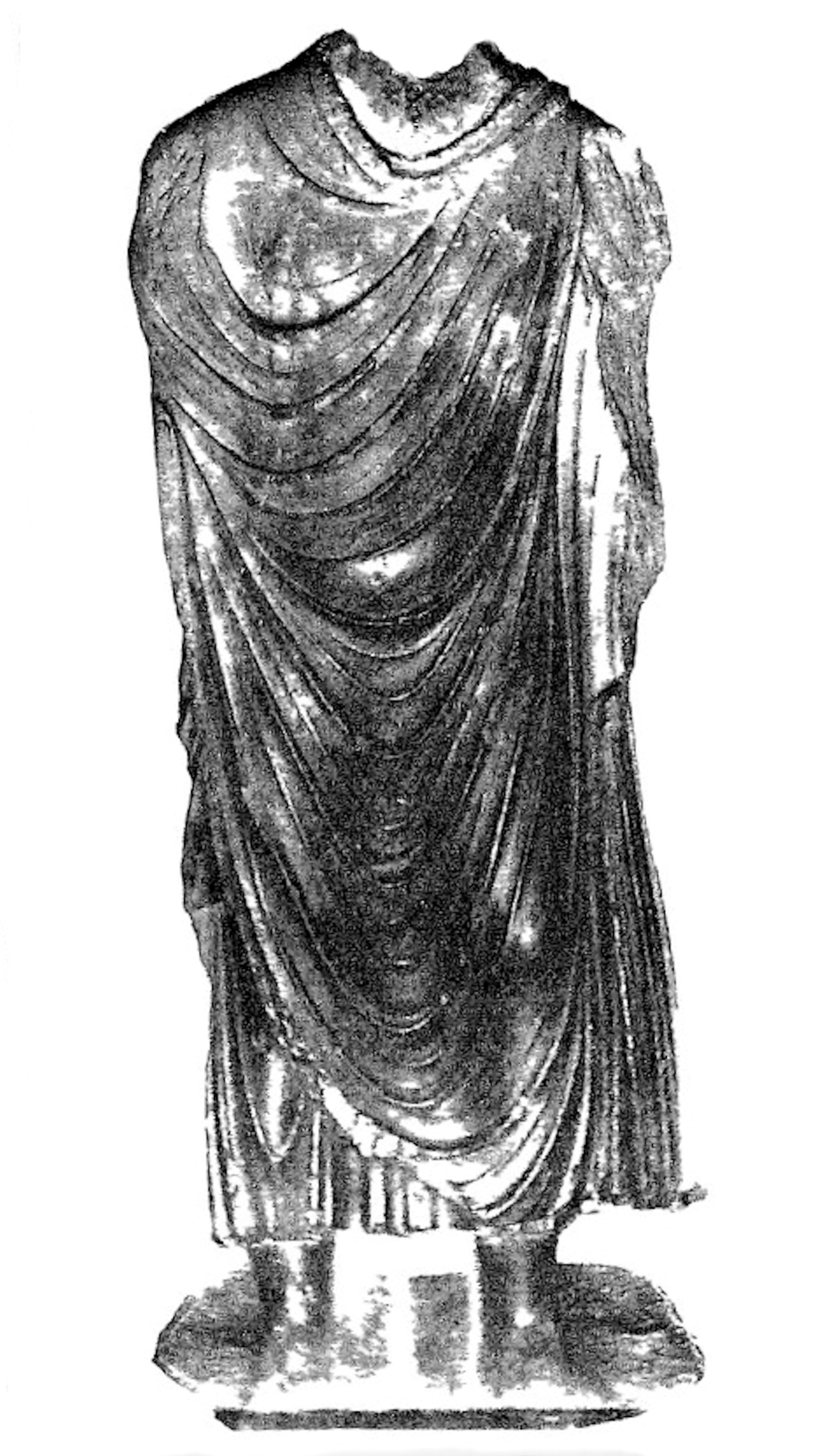
Hashtnagar Buddha, inscribed with "year 384" (probably of the Yavana era), hence 209 CE.

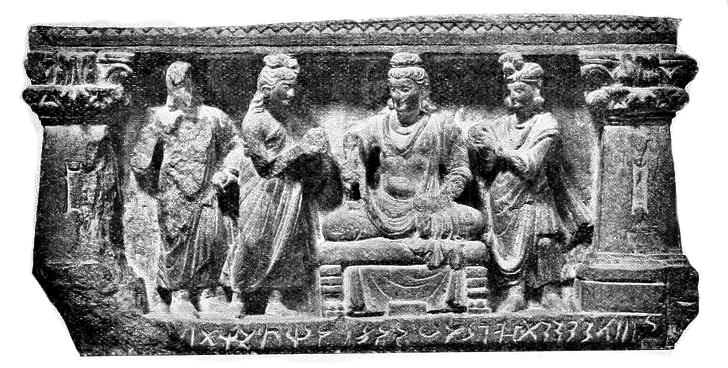
Pedestal of the Hashtnagar Buddha statue, now in the British Museum, inscribed with "year 384" (probably of the Yavana era), hence 209 CE. The inscription reads in the Kharoshthi script: sam 1 1 1 100 20 20 20 20 4 Prothavadasa masasa divasammi pamcami 4 1 ("In the year 384, on the fifth, 5, day of the month Prausthapada"). The pedestal was sawed off from the body of the statue by L. White King in 1883 and brought to the British Museum. British Museum

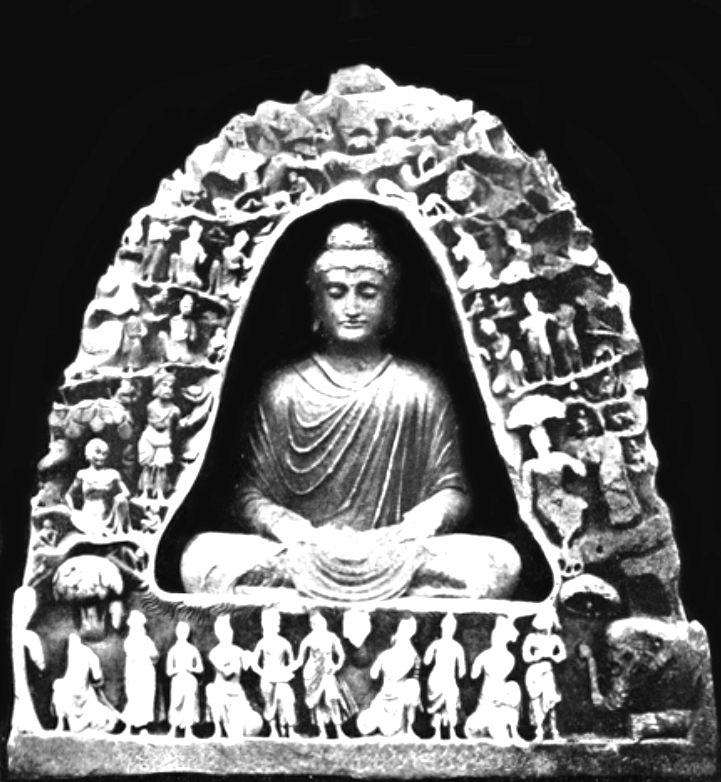
Mamane Dheri Buddha, inscribed with "Year 89" (probably of the Kanishka era), hence 216 CE. Peshawar Museum.

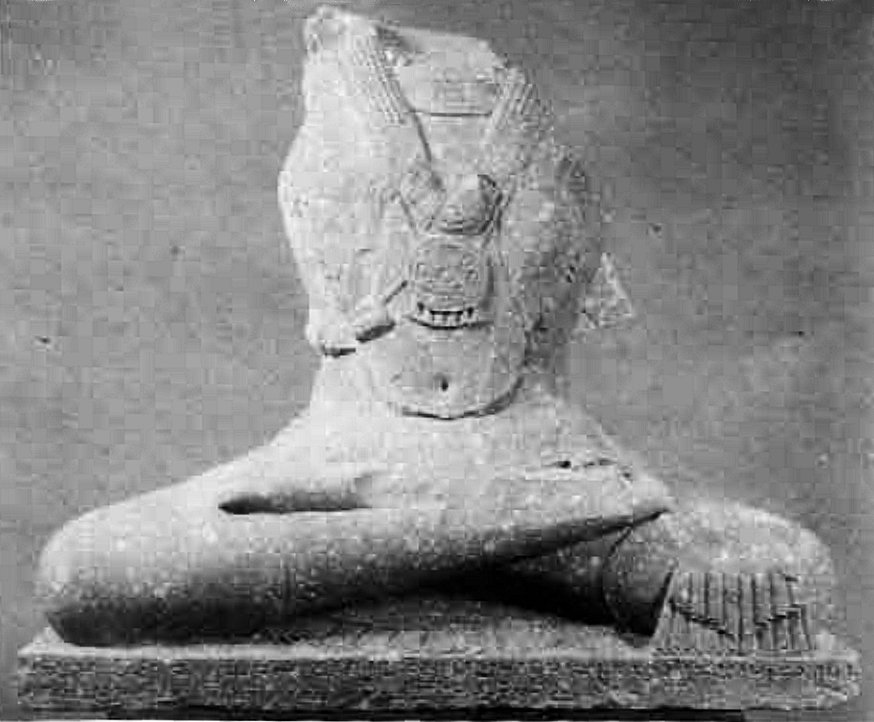
Sakyamuni statue of the "Year 94" (221 CE). Mathura Museum.

== Bibliography ==
- Falk, Harry (2001). "The yuga of Sphujiddhvaja and the era of the Kuṣâṇas." Silk Road Art and Archaeology VII, pp. 121–136.
- Falk, Harry (2004). "The Kaniṣka era in Gupta records." Harry Falk. Silk Road Art and Archaeology X, pp. 167–176.
- Sims-Williams, Nicholas (1998). "Further notes on the Bactrian inscription of Rabatak, with an Appendix on the names of Kujula Kadphises and Vima Taktu in Chinese." Proceedings of the Third European Conference of Iranian Studies Part 1: Old and Middle Iranian Studies. Edited by Nicholas Sims-Williams. Wiesbaden. pp. 79–93.

Preceded by Huvishka	Kushan Ruler	Succeeded by Kanishka II

Territories/ dates	Western India	Western Pakistan Balochistan	Paropamisadae Arachosia	Bajaur	Gandhara	Western Punjab	Eastern Punjab	Mathura	Pataliputra
				INDO-SCYTHIAN KINGDOM			INDO-GREEK KINGDOM	INDO-SCYTHIAN Northern Satraps	
25 BCE – 10 CE				Indo-Scythian dynasty of the APRACHARAJAS; Vijayamitra (ruled 12 BCE – 15 CE) (Note: From the dated inscription on the Rukhana reliquary)	Liaka Kusulaka; Patika Kusulaka; Zeionises	Kharahostes (ruled 10 BCE– 10 CE); Mujatria	Strato II and Strato III	Hagana	
10-20CE		INDO-PARTHIAN KINGDOM; Gondophares		Indravasu	INDO-PARTHIAN KINGDOM; Gondophares		Rajuvula		
20–30 CE			Ubouzanes; Pakores	Vispavarma (ruled c. 0–20 CE)	Sarpedones		Bhadayasa	Sodasa	
30-40 CE			KUSHAN EMPIRE; Kujula Kadphises (c. 50–90)	Indravarma	Abdagases		...	...	
40–45 CE				Aspavarma	Gadana		...	...	
45–50 CE				Sasan	Sases		...	...	
50–75 CE							...	...	
75–100 CE	Indo-Scythian dynasty of the WESTERN SATRAPS; Chastana		Vima Takto (c. 90–113)				...	...	
100–120 CE	Abhiraka		Vima Kadphises (c. 113–127)						
120 CE	Bhumaka; Nahapana	PARATARAJAS; Yolamira	Kanishka I (c. 127–151)				Great Satrap Kharapallana and Satrap Vanaspara for Kanishka I		
130–230 CE	Jayadaman; Rudradaman I Damajadasri I Jivadaman; Rudrasimha I Isvaradatta; Rudrasimha I Jivadaman; Rudrasena I	Bagamira; Arjuna; Hvaramira; Mirahvara	Huvishka (c. 151 – c. 190); Vasudeva I (c. 190 – 230)						
230–250 CE	Samghadaman; Damasena; Damajadasri II; Viradaman; Yasodaman I Vijayasena; Damajadasri III; Rudrasena II; Visvasimha	Miratakhma; Kozana; Bhimarjuna; Koziya; Datarvharna; Datarvharna	KUSHANO-SASANIANS; Ardashir I (c. 230 – 250); Ardashir II (?-245)	Kanishka II (c. 230 – 247)					
250–280	Samghadaman; Damasena; Damajadasri II; Viradaman; Yasodaman I Vijayasena; Damajadasri III; Rudrasena II; Visvasimha	Miratakhma; Kozana; Bhimarjuna; Koziya; Datarvharna; Datarvharna	Peroz I, "Kushanshah" (c. 250 – 265); Hormizd I, "Kushanshah" (c. 265 – 295)			Vāsishka (c. 247 – 267); Kanishka III (c. 267 – 270)			
280–300	Bhratadarman	Datayola II	Hormizd II, "Kushanshah" (c. 295 – 300)			Vasudeva II (c. 267 – 300)		GUPTA EMPIRE; Chandragupta I Samudragupta; Chandragupta II	
300–320 CE	Visvasena; Rudrasimha II; Jivadaman		Peroz II, "Kushanshah" (c. 300 – 325)			Mahi (c. 300–305); Shaka (c. 305 – 335)		GUPTA EMPIRE; Chandragupta I Samudragupta; Chandragupta II	
320–388 CE	Yasodaman II; Rudradaman II; Rudrasena III; Simhasena; Rudrasena IV		Varahran I (325–350); Shapur II Sassanid king and "Kushanshah" (c. 350)			Kipunada (c. 335 – 350)		GUPTA EMPIRE; Chandragupta I Samudragupta; Chandragupta II	
388–396 CE	Rudrasimha III		KIDARITES invasion					GUPTA EMPIRE; Chandragupta I Samudragupta; Chandragupta II	
