= Ardashir I Kushanshah =

Ruler of the Kushano-Sasanian Kingdom from 233 to 245

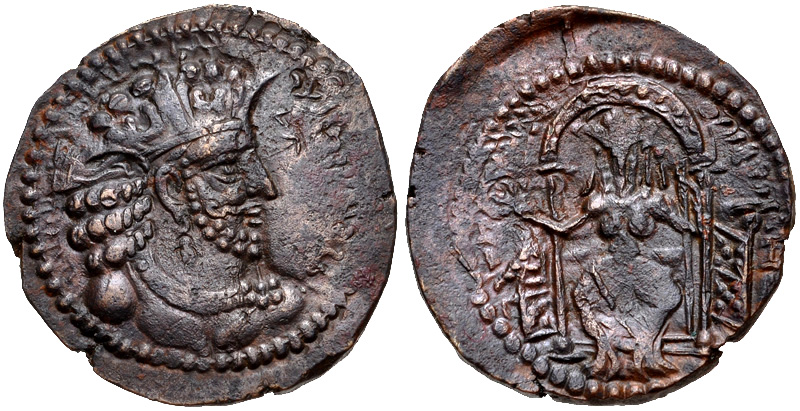
- Coin of Ardashir I Kushanshah, Marw mint

Kushanshah of the Kushano-Sasanian Kingdom
- Reign: 233–245
- Successor: Peroz I Kushanshah
- Died: 245
- Religion: Zoroastrianism

Ardashir I Kushanshah was the first Kushanshah of the Kushano-Sasanian Kingdom from 233 to 245. He was succeeded by Peroz I Kushanshah.

== Name ==
Ardashir is the Middle Persian form of the Old Persian Ṛtaxšira (also spelled Artaxšaçā, meaning "whose reign is through truth"). The Latin variant of the name is Artaxerxes. Three kings of the Achaemenid Empire were known to have the same name.

== Reign ==
Map of the Kushano-Sasanian Kingdom

"Kushano-Sasanian" is a historiographic term used by modern scholars when referring to a dynasty of monarchs who supplanted the Kushan Empire in the Tukharistan region, and ultimately in both Kabulistan and Gandhara as well. According to the historian Khodadad Rezakhani, the dynasty was seemingly a young branch of the House of Sasan, and perhaps a offspring of one of the Sasanian King of Kings. It was founded in 233 by Ardashir I Kushanshah after his appointment by the first Sasanian King of Kings, Ardashir I (r. 224–242). The Kushano-Sasanians, in the same manner as the Kushans, used the title of Kushanshah ("Kushan King"), thus demonstrating a continuum with their predecessors.

The coins of Ardashir I Kushanshah had the Bactrian legend AP∆AÞΟPΟ KΟÞANΟ ÞAΟ, "Ardashir, the Kushan Shah". Some of his coins also had a Pahlavi legend on the reverse reading mzdysn bgy arthštr RBA kwšan MLK "The Mazda-worshipping lord Ardashir the Great Kushan Shah". The reverse of his Bactrian-written coins depicted the goddess Anahita, whilst the ones written in Pahlavi depicted Mithra. Several of Ardashir I Kushanshah's coins have been found together with coins of the Kushan ruler Vasishka, suggesting a level of interaction between the two rulers.

== Sources ==
- Schmitt, R. (1986). "Artaxerxes". Encyclopaedia Iranica, Vol. II, Fasc. 6. pp. 654–655.
- Daryaee, Touraj; Rezakhani, Khodadad (2017). "The Sasanian Empire". In Daryaee, Touraj (ed.). King of the Seven Climes: A History of the Ancient Iranian World (3000 BCE - 651 CE). UCI Jordan Center for Persian Studies. pp. 1–236. ISBN 9780692864401.
- Kia, Mehrdad (2016). The Persian Empire: A Historical Encyclopedia [2 volumes]: A Historical Encyclopedia. ABC-CLIO. ISBN 978-1610693912.
- Rezakhani, Khodadad (2017). "East Iran in Late Antiquity". ReOrienting the Sasanians: East Iran in Late Antiquity. Edinburgh University Press. pp. 1–256. ISBN 9781474400305. JSTOR 10.3366/j.ctt1g04zr8. (registration required)
- Vaissière, Étienne de La (2016). "Kushanshahs i. History". Encyclopaedia Iranica.
- Wiesehöfer, Joseph (1986). "Ardašīr I i. History". Encyclopaedia Iranica, Vol. II, Fasc. 4. pp. 371–376.

| Preceded by Kushan Empire | Kushanshah of the Kushano-Sasanian Kingdom; 233–245 | Succeeded by Peroz I Kushanshah |
