= Étienne de la Vaissière =

French historian (born 1969)

Etienne de la Vaissière
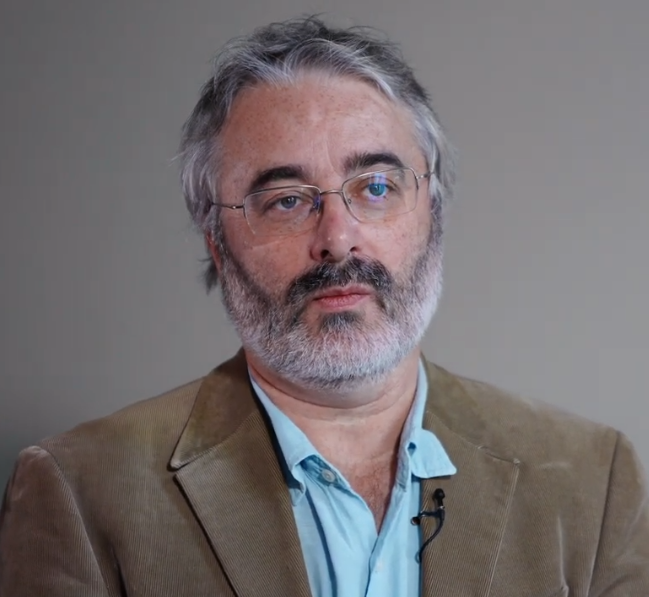
- In a 2024 interview
- Born: 5 November 1969 (age 56); Dijon, France
- Occupation: Historian

Étienne de La Vaissière (born 5 November 1969) is a French historian, professor at the École des hautes études en sciences sociales, in Paris. He teaches the economic and social history of early medieval Central Asia, before and after the arrival of Islam. He is a specialist in Sogdian culture, its traders and nobility, and also in the nomadic invasions of the fourth and fifth centuries. Some of his theories are:

- a depiction of the network which gave to the image of "Silk Road" its only historical reality during the Early Middle Ages
- the textual proof that the Huns and the Xiongnu are indeed synonymous
- a shift of two centuries in the history of Eastern Manichaeism (it arrived in China in the 6th century)
- a reinterpretation of Abbasid 9th century political history pushing the birth of the mamluk phenomenon to the 860s-870s

He contributed to the expedition that led to the decipherment of the inscription of Hüis Tolgoi.

== Books ==
- Histoire des marchands sogdiens, De Boccard, Paris, 2002
  - New edition corrected and expanded, 2004
  - English translation Sogdian traders : a history, Handbook of Uralic studies v.10, Leiden, 2005, ISBN 978-90-04-14252-7
- Samarcande et Samarra. Elites d'Asie centrale dans l'empire abbasside, Peeters, Louvain, 2007
- With Éric Trombert, Les Sogdiens en Chine, École française d’Extrême-Orient, Paris, 2005
- With Matteo Compareti, Royal Nawruz in Samarkand, supplement of the Rivista degli Studi Orientali, 2006
- With M. Ghose "Ephtalites", in Bulletin of the Asia Institute, 2007.
- Islamisation de l'Asie centrale. Processus locaux d'acculturation du VIIe au XIe siècle, Peeters, Louvain, 2008.

== Articles ==
- de La Vaissière, Étienne (2003). "Is There a "Nationality of the Hephtalites"?". Bulletin of the Asia Institute. 17: 119–132. ISSN 0890-4464. JSTOR 24049310.
- de La Vaissière, Étienne (2005). "Huns et Xiongnu". Central Asiatic Journal. 49 (1): 3–26. ISSN 0008-9192. JSTOR 41928374.
- de La Vaissière, Étienne (2006). "Les Turcs, rois du monde à Samarcande". Rivista degli studi orientali. 78: 147–162. ISSN 0392-4866. JSTOR 41913394.
