= Joe Cribb =

British numismatist

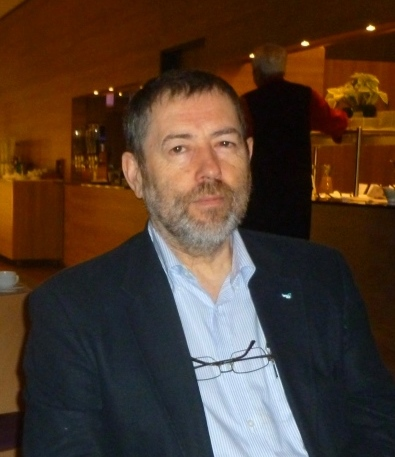
Cribb at the Berlin symposium on the Kushans in 2013

Joe Cribb (born 1948) is a numismatist, specialising in Asian coinages, and in particular on coins of the Kushan Empire. His catalogues of Chinese silver currency ingots, and of ritual coins of Southeast Asia were the first detailed works on these subjects in English. With David Jongeward he published a catalogue of Kushan, Kushano-Sasanian and Kidarite Hun coins in the American Numismatic Society New York in 2015. In 2021, he was appointed Adjunct Professor of Numismatics at Hebei Normal University, China.

== Career ==
Joe Cribb studied Latin, Greek, and Ancient History at Queen Mary College, University of London, graduating in 1970. He became a research assistant at the Department of Coins and Medals at the British Museum. He eventually rose to be the Keeper of the Coins and Medals (2003–2010), before his retirement in 2010. His work was focused at first on the Chinese coin collection, but later expanded to other aspects of Asian coinage.

During his time at the museum he curated a major exhibition Money: from Cowrie Shells to Credit Cards (1986), developed the museum's first Money Gallery, and contributed to many other exhibitions and catalogues.

Cribb has specialist knowledge of all Asian coinages. He started looking at Chinese coins, and wrote the first English-language catalogue on Chinese silver ingots, and then focused on the pre-Islamic coinages of India, Bangladesh, Sri Lanka, Pakistan, Kashmir, and Afghanistan. He is particularly renowned for his research on the coins of the Kushan kings of ancient South and Central Asia (first to fourth centuries).

In addition to his work at the British Museum, Cribb was President of the Royal Numismatic Society (2005–2009) and was Secretary General of the Oriental Numismatic Society (2011–2018).

He was also a Trustee of the Ditchling Museum, where his grandfather Joseph Cribb was a sculptor, and coordinator of the Eric Gill Society.

== Honours and awards ==
- 1997 Award of the Hirayama Silk Road Institute, Kamakura
- 1999 Medal of the Royal Numismatic Society (1999),
- 2009 Huntington Medal of the American Numismatic Society
- 2023 Honorary Doctorate from Hebei Normal University
- 2023 Derek Allen Prize of the British Academy

Two volumes of papers in his honour were presented to him upon his retirement from the British Museum, and a Festschrift to mark his 75th birthday:

- Nasim Khan (ed.) Gandharan Studies, Vol. 4 (2010).
- Shailendra Bhandare and Sanjay Garg (eds): Felicitas: Essays in Numismatics, Epigraphy and History in Honour of Joe Cribb (Mumbai: Reesha Books International, 2011).
- Helen Wang and Robert Bracey (eds), Look at the Coins! Papers in Honour of Joe Cribb on his 75th Birthday (Oxford: Archaeopress, 2023)

== Publications ==
A selection of his publications are given below:

Books

- (ed.) Money, from Cowrie Shells to Credit Cards, BM Press, London, 1986.
- (with T. Francis) Money Fun Book, BM Press, London, 1986.
- Money in the Bank, an Illustrated Introduction to the Money Collection of The Hongkong and Shanghai Banking Corporation, Spink & Son Ltd., London, 1987.
- (with I. Carradice and B. Cook) The Coin Atlas, London, Macdonald, London, 1990.
- (contributor and co-editor with E. Errington) Crossroads of Asia, Transformation in Image and Symbol in the Art of Ancient Afghanistan and Pakistan, Ancient India and Iran Trust, Cambridge, 1992.
- A Catalogue of Sycee in the British Museum, Chinese Silver Currency Ingots, c.1750–1933, British Museum Press, London 1992.
- (co-editor with H. Wang and K. Tanabe) Studies in Silk Road Coins and Culture, Papers in Honour of Professor Ikuo Hirayama on his 65th Birthday, Institute of Silk Road Studies, Kamakura, 1997.
- Magic Coins of Java, Bali and the Malay Peninsula, 13th century to 20th century – A Catalogue based on the Raffles Collection of Coin-shaped charms from Java in the British Museum, BM Press, London, 1999.
- Eyewitness Guide: Money, Dorling Kindersley, London, 1990, (revised edition, 2000).
- (with H. Wang, M. Cowell and S. Bowman, eds) Metallurgical Analysis of Chinese Coins at the British Museum, British Museum Research Publication 152, 2005.
- (co-authored with R. Cribb) Eric Gill and Ditchling: The Workshop Tradition, Ditchling, 2007.
- (co-edited with G. Herrmann) After Alexander: Central Asia before Islam, Proceedings of the British Academy 133, London, 2007 .
- (co-authored with M.N. Khan and E. Errington) Coins from Kashmir Smast – New Numismatic Evidence, Peshawar, 2008.
- (co-authored with Robert Bracey) Kushan Coins: A Catalogue Based on the Kushan, Kushano-Sasanian and Kidarite Hun Coins in The British Museum, 1st-5th Centuries (British Museum Press, 2025) ISBN 978-0861591916. Open Access.

Articles

- 'The end of Greek coinage in Bactria and India and its evidence for the Kushan coinage system', in R. Ashton and S. Hurter (eds) Studies in Greek Numismatics in Memory of Martin Jessop Price, Spink & Son Ltd., London, 1998, pp. 83–98, plates 21–23.
- 'The early Kushan kings: new evidence for chronology – Evidence from the Rabatak inscription of Kanishka I', in M. Alram and D.E. Klimburg-Salter (eds) Coins, Art and Chronology, Essays on the pre-Islamic History of the Indo-Iranian Borderlands, Vienna 1999, pp. 177–205.
- 'Kanishka I’s Buddha image coins revisited', in Silk Road Art and Archaeology, Kamakura, vol. 6, 1999/2000, pp. 151–189.
- Ancient Indian Coins from the Chand Collection, Rarities Ltd and Asian Civilisations Museum, Singapore, 2003, pp. x and 66
- 'The origins of money - evidence from the ancient Near East and Egypt', in G. Crapanzano (ed.), La Banca Premonetale - Contributi culturale e storici intorno alle prime forme di transazione mentaria, Art Valley Association, Milan, 2004.
- 'The Indian Coinage Tradition: Origins, Continuity and Change', in Indian Institute of Research in Numismatic Studies, Nasik, 2005, pp. 72
- 'Money as Metaphor 1: Money is Justice', in Numismatic Chronicle, (2005), pp. 417–438, pl. 47, '2: Money is Order', in Numismatic Chronicle, (2006), pp. 494–516, pl. 83-96; '3: Money is Time', Numismatic Chronicle (2007), pp. 361–95, pls. 83–96; '4: Money is Power', Numismatic Chronicle (2009) pp. 461–529, pl. 49–56.
- Dating and locating Mujatria and the two Kharahostes, Journal of the Oriental Numismatics Society, 2015, p. 26-47
