= Battle of Narasara =

Military engagement of the Roman-Persian wars

- Part of the Perso-Roman wars of 337–361
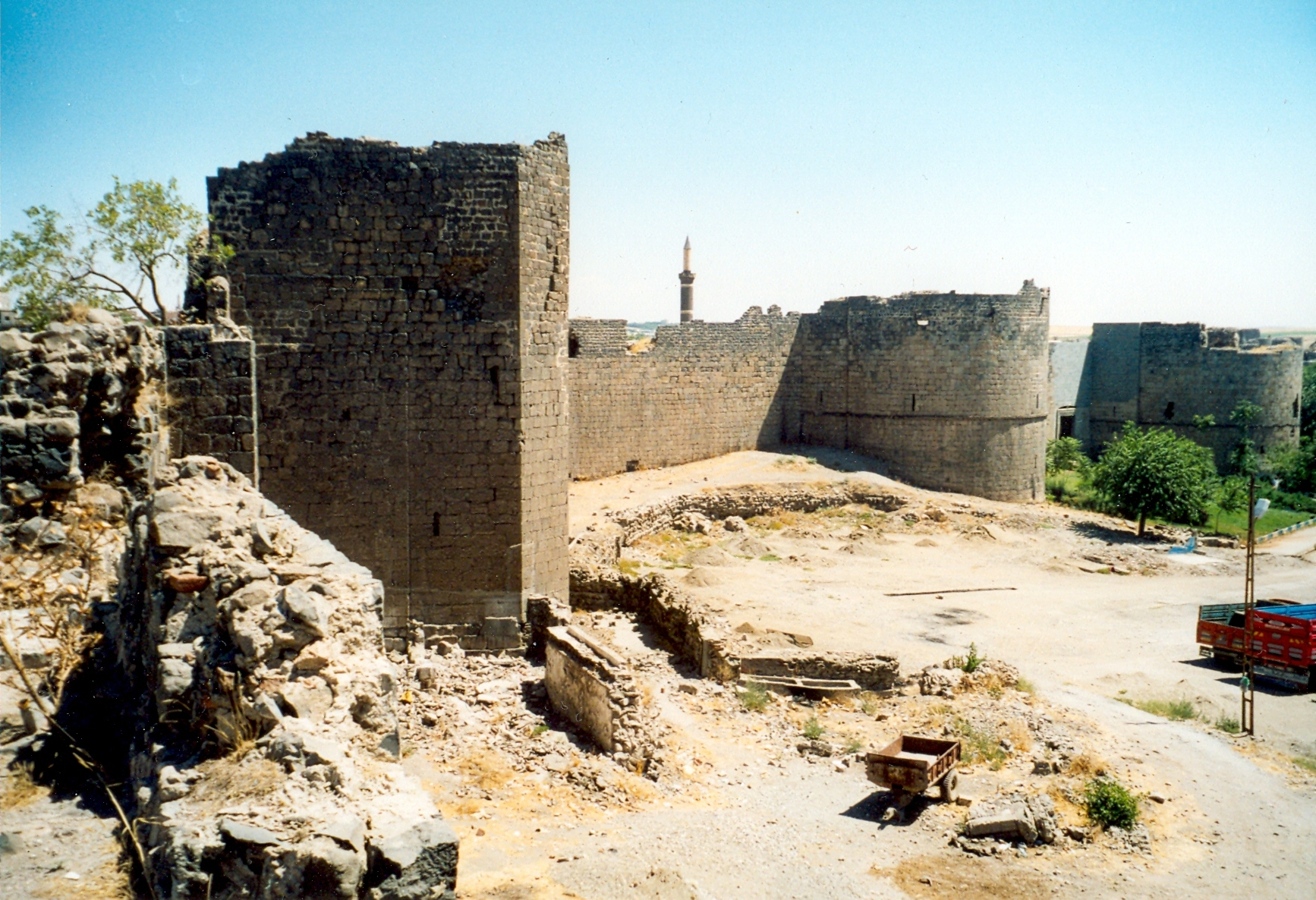
- The walls of the city of Amida (Diyarbakır) built by Constantius II a few years before the battle
Date	337 or October 343
Location	Narasara, possibly near Nineveh, Amida or Singara (see § below)
Result	Roman victory
Territorial changes	Rome recaptures Amida and Nineveh

Belligerents
Sasanian Empire	Roman Empire

Commanders and leaders
Narses, brother of Shapur †	Constantius II^{?}

Casualties and losses
Nineveh's population deported to Thrace	

The Battle of Narasara in 337 or October 343 was one of the first clashes of the Roman-Persian wars under Emperor Constantius II. Sasanian troops under Narses, brother of the Sasanian king of kings (shahanshah) Shapur II, invaded Roman Mesopotamia and took the city of Amida. In the subsequent engagement, Narses was defeated and killed by a local Roman force, and the Romans recaptured the lost territories, including the city of Nineveh, whose inhabitants were deported to Roman Thrace.

== Background ==
In 334, Tiridates III of Armenia, allied with Rome, was captured by Shapur II and taken to Persia, forcing the Armenians to invoke the help of Emperor Constantine. Shapur, realizing Armenia's weakness, decided to annex the region, directly threatening the nearby province of Roman Mesopotamia.

In 335, Emperor Constantine sent his son Constantius in the wast as preparation for a campaign against the Sasanian Empire. Constantius, with the help of Ablabius, recruited and drafted new soldiers, implemented training and drills, expanded the cavalry, and stockpiled supplies. These preparations, however, did not go unnoticed by the Persians.

== Battle ==
=== Narrative ===
Narses, the younger brother of Shapur II, was ordered to invade Roman Mesopotamia. The Sassanians had used previous years to amass a considerable army, including siege engines and war elephants, and Aswaran clibinarii which Libanius describes as being more heavily armoured than earlier Sassanian cavalry. Narseh advanced deep into the province and winning several minor cavalry skirmishes capturing Amida (Diyarbakır), before being confronted by a Roman army at a place called Narasara. There, the Romans destroyed Narseh's army. It is possible that the Romans had positioned themselves behind the Sassanian army to cut off their route of retreat before engaging them in the battle. According to Festus, Narses was killed in the battle. This identification is supported by modern scholarship, which distinguishes him from Narses, son of Shapur, who died at the Battle of Singara. (Note: Festus identifies the Narses at Narasara as a son of Shapur II, whereas Movses Khorenatsi identifies him as Shapur's brother. The identification of the Narses killed at Narasara with Shapur's brother is based in part on the account of Theophanes the Confessor, analyzed by Mosig-Walburg, whose article distinguishes the Narses involved in the battles of Narasara and Singara.) Following this victory, the Romans recaptured Amida and also captured Nineveh. According to Libanius, the population of the latter city was deported to Thrace.

=== Date and triumph ===
Traditionally, the battle has been dated to 337. Arce, following an analysis of an inscription from Troesmis (ILS 724), proposes a date of 335. On this reconstruction, Constantius II would have been present on the eastern frontier and taken part in the battle. Portmann, based on Theophanes the Confessor's account, instead, dates the battle to 341. Burgess, however, rejects this chronology, arguing that Theophanes' Anni mundi can be used only as a subsidiary chronology to the regnal years. He instead dates the battle to October 343, a date also accepted by Malosse. Therefore, Constantius was at Antioch when the battle took place, and on 31 January 344 he held a triumph, which was later commemorated with four days of ludi (public games) on 26 and 28 to 31 January to mark the event.

=== Localization and identification ===
The location of Narasara is disputed among modern historians, and several identifications have been proposed. One possibility places it somewhere in the vicinity of Nineveh. Other historians identify it with Nararra (Nehar Ḥarré), approximately 13 Roman miles east of Amida, on the road towards Tigranocerta. Another possibility is that the battle took place in the vicinity of Singara (Sinjar), with the eponym "Narasara" deriving from Narses, the brother of Shapur II. If this identification is accepted, the battle most likely took place at the foot of the Sinjar mountain range, along the Nahr Ghîrân river.

A few historians have proposed that Narasara formed part of the Battle of Singara, which they regard as a series of engagements rather than a single battle. Several historians, however, reject this interpretation, noting that Festus, in his account of the battles fought by Constantius against the Persians, distinguishes between these two battles. (Note: Festus lists eleven battles, namely at Sisarvena, two at Singarena (one of them may be the one reported by Ammianus Marcellinus that took place in 360), at Sicgarena, Constantiensis, the Persian conquest of Amida, the three sieges at Nisibis (338, 346, 350), at Narasara, and finally, Singara.)

== See also ==
- Siege of Nisibis (338)
- Battle of Singara (344)
- Siege of Nisibis (350)
- Siege of Singara (360)

== Bibliography ==
- Arce, Javier (1982). "The Inscription of Troesmis (ILS 724) and the First Victories of Constantius II as Caesar". Zeitschrift für Papyrologie und Epigraphik. 48: 245–249.
- Burgess, R. W. (1999). Studies in Eusebian and Post-Eusebian Chronography. Historia – Einzelschriften. Franz Steiner Verlag. ISBN 3-515-07530-5.
- Crawford, Peter (2016). Constantius II: Usurpers, Eunuchs, and the Antichrist. Pen & Sword Books. ISBN 978-1-78340-055-3.
- Dodgeon, Michael H.; Lieu, Samuel N. C. (1991). The Roman Eastern Frontier and the Persian Wars (AD 226–363): A Documentary History. Routledge. ISBN 0-415-10317-7.
- Ensslin, W. (1936). "Zu dem vermuteten Perserfeldzug des rex Hannibalianus". Klio (in German). 29 (29): 102–110.
- Harrel, John S. (2016). The Nisibis War: The Defence of the Roman East, AD 337–363. Pen & Sword Books. ISBN 978-1-47384-830-6.
- Malosse, Pierre-Louis (2002). "Enquête surla date du discours 59 de Libanios". Antiquité Tardive (in French). 9: 297–306.
- Mosig-Walburg, Karin (2000). "Zu Spekulationen über den sasanidischen 'Thronfolger Narsê' und seine Rolle in den sasanidisch-römischen Auseinandersetzungen im zweiten Viertel des 4. Jahrhunderts n. Chr". Iranica Antiqua (in German). 35: 111–157.
- Portmann, W. (1989). "Die 59. Rede Des Libanios Und Das Datum Der Schlacht Von Singara". Byzantinische Zeitschrift (in German). 82 (1/2): 1–18.
- Syvänne, Ilkka (2015). Military History of Late Rome, 284–361. Pen & Sword Books. ISBN 1-4738-7184-0.
