= Siege of Nisibis (350) =

- Part of the Perso-Roman wars of 337–361
Date	Early spring AD 350
Location	Nisibis (modern-day Nusaybin, Turkey)
Result	Roman victory

Belligerents
Roman Empire	Sasanian Empire

Commanders and leaders
Lucillianus; Vologaeses, bishop of Nisibis	Shapur II

Casualties and losses
Unknown, presumably light	Heavy, up to 10,000 killed

The Siege of Nisibis in AD 350 was the third attempt by Shapur II, the Sasanian King of Kings, to capture the strategically important Roman frontier city of Nisibis (modern-day Nusaybin, Turkey). Like his previous unsuccessful sieges in AD 338 and 346, this campaign would end in failure, though it came closer to success than any prior attempt.

== Background ==
When Shapur II, who ascended to the throne of the Sasanian Empire in AD 309 (at the time an unborn infant), came of age and took in hand the administration of his kingdom, he dedicated himself to a lifelong mission of restoring his country's military power, and avenging its recent defeats by the Romans and Saracens. After thoroughly subduing the Lakhmid Arabs rebellion in the south, he directed his attention towards Rome, his main enemy.

In AD 337, Shapur II had sent his general Narses to invade Armenia, but Narses was defeated and killed at Narasara. Following Constantine the Great's death, Shapur personally besieged Nisibis, which was then regarded as the key to Mesopotamia. After sixty days, no closer to taking the city and with a plague hampering his army, he lifted the siege and returned to Persia.

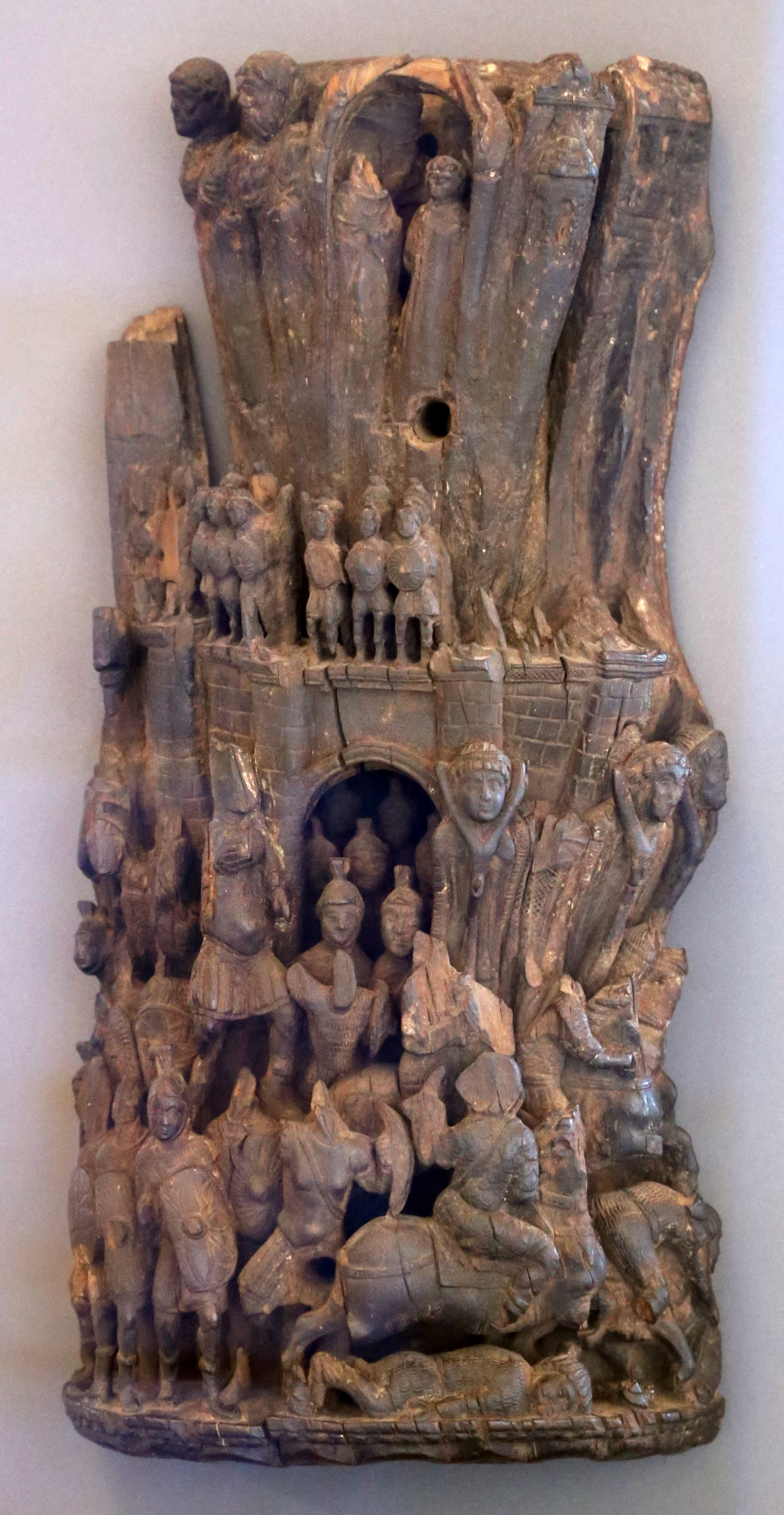
Cypress sculpture, considered as a possible representation of siege warfare during the Perso-Roman wars of 337–361: the Roman infantry in helmet, lorica hamata and shield, frees a city besieged by the Persian cataphract horsemen, armed with long lorica squamata

Following a second failed siege of Nisibis in AD 346, another major engagement occurred, where Constantius met Shapur's forces near Singara. The date of this battle is uncertain, and sources are divided as to the victor of the battle. While the Sasanians camped around Singara, the Romans launched a nighttime raid on their camp, killing many Sasanian soldiers in their sleep. This disrupted Shapur's AD 348 campaign, and the Sasanian army retreated to their own territory.

== Siege ==
In early spring AD 350, Shapur invaded and besieged Nisibis for the third time. Roman Emperor Constantius II had left the defence of Mesopotamia and the city of Nisibis to Count Lucillianus, a competent and respected officer. Vologaeses, the bishop of Nisibis, also participated in the siege.

There is no indication that Constantius sent Lucillianus any reinforcements from the field army. It is assumed that Shapur, as was his custom in 359 and 360, upon his arrival before the walls of Nisibis, tried to persuade the garrison to capitulate.

The Persians besieged the city for between 100 and 160 days. The Persian engineers used every siege tactic, which Count Lucillianus successfully defeated. Finally, the Persian engineers brought down a section of the wall by use of the Mygdonius River, and the valley flooded. When the whole plain was filled with water up to the walls of the city, a Sasanid fleet was embarked and floated to the ramparts.

A part of the walls collapsed and the Sasanids withdrew in preparation for the assault. The attack which was launched, supported by Sasanid war elephants, bogged down in the muddy waters formed by the lake, and Shapur gave the signal to fall back. According to the Chronicon Paschale, the Persians suffered heavy losses, amounting to 10,000 troops lost.

Shortly after this failed assault, the Persian Army lifted the siege and retreated after suffering heavy casualties from combat and disease. Before retreating to Persia, Shapur burned all his siege equipment and executed some of his chief officers and advisors. The lifting of the siege represented another humiliating defeat for the Persians.

== Bibliography ==
- Colombo, Maurizio (2012). "La datazione dell'"Epitoma Rei Militaris" e la genesi dell'esercito tardoromano" [The Dating of the "Epitoma Rei Militaris" and The Genesis of the Late Roman Army]. Ancient Society. 42: 255–92. ISSN 0066-1619. JSTOR 44079966.
- Crawford, Peter (2016). Constantius II: Usurpers, Eunuchs, and the Antichrist. Pen & Sword Books. ISBN 978-1-473-88393-2.
- Debié, Muriel (2006). "Nisibe sauvée des eaux" [Nisibis Saved from the Waters]. In Caseau, Béatrice; Cheynet, Jean-Claude; Déroche, Vincent (eds.). Pèlerinages et lieux saints dans l'Antiquité et le Moyen-Âge [Pilgrimages and Holy Places in Antiquity and the Middle Ages]. Association des Amis du Centre d'Histoire et Civilisation de Byzance. pp. 135–51. ISBN 978-2-916-71608-4. OCLC 71336477.
- Fiey, Jean-Maurice (1977). Nisibe: métropole syriaque orientale et ses suffragants des origines à nos jours [Nisibis: Eastern Syriac Metropolis and its Suffragan States from Their Origins to The Present Day]. Secretariat du Corpus Scriptorum Christianorum Orientalium. OCLC 462681806.
- Harrel, John (2016). The Nisibis War: The Defence of the Roman East, AD 337–363. Pen & Sword Books. ISBN 978-1-473-84830-6.
- Lightfoot, Chris (1988). "Facts and Fiction: The Third Siege of Nisibis (AD 350)". Historia: Zeitschrift für Alte Geschichte. 27 (1): 105–25. JSTOR 4436041.
