= Siege of Nisibis =

Siege of Nisibis may refer to:

- Siege of Nisibis (197) by the Parthians under Vologases V
- Siege of Nisibis (235)
- Siege of Nisibis (252) by the Sassanids under Shapur I
- Siege of Nisibis (262) by the Romans under Odaenathus
- Siege of Nisibis (338) by the Sassanids under Shapur II
- Siege of Nisibis (346) by the Sassanids under Shapur II
- Siege of Nisibis (350) by the Sassanids under Shapur II
- Siege of Nisibis (573)

== See also ==
- Battle of Nisibis (disambiguation)
