= Perso-Roman wars of 337–361 =

Wars between Rome and Persia

- Part of Roman–Persian Wars
Date	337 – 361
Location	Armenia, Mesopotamia
Result	Indecisive

Belligerents
Roman Empire and allies	Sasanian Empire and allies

Commanders and leaders
Constantius II; Ursicinus	Shapur II; Narses; Grumbates

The Perso-Roman wars of 337–361 were a series of military conflicts fought between the Roman Empire and the Sasanian Empire between 337 and 361. They were a result of long-standing competition between the rival powers over influence in the border kingdoms of Armenia and Iberia, as well as the desire of Shapur II, after his Arab campaign, to revoke the unfavorable terms of the Treaty of Nisibis, which had concluded the previous war between the empires. Though the Romans under Constantius II were defeated in several sanguinary encounters, Shapur was unable to secure a decisive victory.

== Events ==
=== First war: 337–350 ===
In 335, Emperor Constantine sent his son Constantius in preparation for a campaign against the Sasanian Empire. Constantius recruited and drafted new soldiers, implemented training and drills, expanded the cavalry, and stockpiled supplies. These preparations did not go unnoticed by the Sasanians. In 336, Shapur II sent his general Narses to invade Armenia. Narses, however, was defeated and killed at Narasara. Following Constantine the Great's death, Shapur besieged Nisibis, which was then regarded as the key to Mesopotamia. After sixty days, no closer to taking Nisibis and with a plague hampering his army, he lifted the siege and returned to Persia. Although he lost at Nisibis, Shapur collected tribute from the Armenian king Khosrov starting in the year 345–6.

In 343–4, Constantius met Shapur's forces near Singara or Alaina. The date of this battle is uncertain. (Note: Not even the date of this, the biggest confrontation between Constantius and Shapur, is certain, with 343, 344, and 348 all mentioned) Sources are divided as to the victor of the battle. Some sources state a Sasanian victory, some a Roman victory, while another states a pyrrhic Roman victory. (Note: The battle of Singara was technically a Roman victory because they held the field of battle, but Roman casualties made it a pyrrhic victory.)

In 346–7 Shapur besieged Nisibis a second time, and was repulsed.

In 348, a Sasanian army invaded Roman Mesopotamia and marched on Singara. The fortress city was either besieged or blockaded. While the Sasanians camped around Singara, the Romans launched a nighttime raid on their camp, killing many Sasanian soldiers in their sleep. This disrupted Shapur's 348 campaign. The Sasanian army retreated to their own territory.

In 350, Shapur laid siege to Nisibis, for a third time. The dams of the river Mygdonius, which passed near the valley in which Nisibis was located, were broken down, and the valley flooded. When the whole plain was filled with water up to the walls of the city, a Sasanid fleet was embarked and floated to the ramparts. A part of the walls collapsed and the Sasanids withdrew in preparation for the assault. The attack which was launched, supported by Sasanid war-elephants, bogged down in the muddy waters formed by the lake, and Shapur gave the signal to fall back. In the interval of a single night the defenders effected the repair of the walls, this along with news of Hunnic invasions of the eastern provinces, compelled Shapur to a cessation of hostilities against Rome. Before retreating to Persia, Shapur burned all his siege equipment and executed some of his chief officers and advisors.

The usurpation of Magnentius in the west occurred around the same time diverting Constantius, who left his cousin Gallus to defend the east.

=== Interwar: 350–359 ===
During 350-359 the war between the Roman and Sasanid Empires languished. Constantius was engaged in several campaigns against enemies, both foreign and domestic, while Shapur was occupied with his eastern campaign in the steppes of Central Asia.

In 356, however, the Romans made serious overtures towards a lasting peace. Shapur delivered his conditions to the following effect: that should Constantius deliver up the provinces of Mesopotamia and Armenia, which Diocletian had wrested from Narseh under the Treaty of Nisibis. Constantius, though discredited by previous defeats, and even himself secretly doubtful of the outcome of a second war, treated the offer with contempt. Yet, he dispatched civil and military officers accompanied by a sophist on a new embassy to the Sasanid court, advising Shapur II of the necessity of more reasonable grounds for peace. The embassy was dismissed by Shapur when he arrived at Ctesiphon and preparations were conducted for another campaign.

=== Second war: 359–361 ===
In 359, Shapur II launched a large scale invasion into Roman Mesopotamia. During this campaign he was assisted by the Roman turncoat Antoninus who had critical knowledge of the Roman defences. With most of the eastern tribes (including the Chionites) now supporting his army, Shapur crossed the Tigris at Nineveh and marched to Singara which he stormed or blockaded. He then marched to Bebase, a major road junction on the Khabur River. From there he could threatened Nisibis to the east and Zeugma, where the main bridge across the Euphrates was located, to the west. He surprised general Ursicinus, whose headquarters was in Nisibis, by suddenly marching toward the Amida to the north.

As soon as Ursicinus' spies, including later historian Ammianus Marcellinus, had informed him the Sasanian army had crossed the Tigris, he secured the defenses of Nisibis and proceeded to Amida. After giving orders for the fields of Roman Mesopotamia to be burned to prevent Shapur's army using it as fodder, the population took refuge in the fortified city. With Shapur's crossing of the Tigris secured, Ursicinus fell back to Amida, from which he could harass the Sasanians if they besieged Nisibis or threaten their lines of communication and supply in case they marched west. After setting up his headquarters at Amida, Ursicinus retreated to oversee the defense of the Euphrates.

Six Roman legions: V Parthica, XXX Ulpia Victrix, Magnentius, Decentius, Superventores and Praeventores and a detachment (vexillation) of X Fortenses had been gathered at Amida and took up its defence. The legions Magnentius, Decentius and XXX Ulpia Victrix were remnants of the army of the usurper Magnentius, and had been sent east by Constantius at the end of the civil war. Unlike the other legions in the area, these three legions were made up of Gallic soldiers. The numbers of the Roman force at Amida are a point of debate: Crawford puts them at 20,000, Blockley at 7,000–10,000, and Harrel at 5,300. The army of Shapur reportedly numbered 100,000 men.

Shapur bypassed Nisibis and reached Bebase. From there, his scouts informed him of the flooding of the Euphrates and a strong Roman fortification on the other bank. Faced with this predicament, Antoninus advised the Sasanid monarch to force march his army and cross the Euphrates northwest of Amida. From there Shapur could advance into the interior of Asia Minor. Marching by way of Horre, Miacarire, Carcha, and the fortresses of Reman and Busan which capitulated on his approach, Shapur arrived beneath the walls of Amida at the end of July.

==== Siege of Amida (359) ====
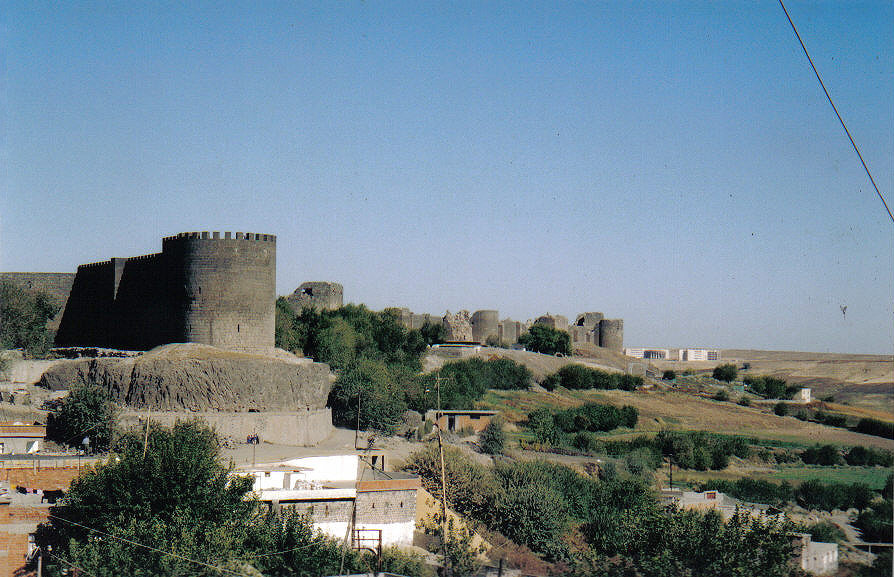
The walls of Amida, built by Constantius II before the Siege of Amida of 359.

Shapur convinced himself that the mere sight of his formidable army would terrorize the city into surrender. Grumbates, king of the Chionites, was sent to threaten the defiant city into submission. But before the king could make known the reason of his approach, a dart from the Roman ballistae struck his son and crown prince killing him instantly.

The Sasanids encircled the city on every side; as auxiliaries, the Vertae were assigned the assault of the south wall, the Albanians on the north, the Chionites to the east, and the Segestanis with their war-elephants on the west. The operations of the siege began with a two-day mutual discharge of missiles, following heavy casualties on both sides, a truce was concluded. The Sasanids then set themselves to raising mounds for scaling the walls, and siege towers captured from the Romans in the previous war at Singara. Meanwhile, the forays of the Sasanid cavalry were devastating the surrounding country taking many prisoners and much spoil. Ursicinus, who proposed a bold attack using light infantry to divert the Sasanid blockade, was accused of fomenting a treacherous reverse through his excessive zeal for the relief of the city.

A night attack on the Sasanid camp by two Gallic legions from Amida boosted Roman morale and inflicted heavy losses on the Sasanid army, but the loss of 400 Gauls was more devastating to the besieged city. Shapur increased his assaults on the city only to suffer further casualties due to the Roman scorpions and fire darts. Finally the Roman structures, under the bombardment of Sasanid ballistae, collapsed. The Sasanids carried their earth mounds to the level of the ramparts, and swarmed into the city. After a prolonged last-ditch defense the garrison was overpowered, the city sacked and the inhabitants removed to the further reaches of the Sasanid Empire. Count Aelianus and the rest of the surviving Roman commanders were crucified. The siege being successful and autumn arriving, the Sasanids were obliged to return to winter-quarters.

==== Campaigns of 360 ====
In spring 360, Shapur renewed his inroads into Mesopotamia, besieging the desert town of Singara. The wall was breached after some days by battering ram, and the town fell. The 1st Flavian and 1st Parthian legions which had formed the garrison, as well as the inhabitants of Singara, were sent into captivity in Sasanid Persia.

Shapur then invested Bazabde, a strong Roman fortress on the Tigris. He lingered only to repair the walls and post a strong garrison in Bazabde before he proceeded on an expedition against Virtha, a formidable fortress on the outliers of the Mesopotamian desert. But the garrison of Virtha defended themselves successfully and Shapur retired over the Tigris towards the end of the campaign season.

In the meantime, towards autumn of 360, Constantius finally arrived at the head of his long-prepared army. The revolt of Julian in Gaul had momentarily delayed the emperor, but his ministers prevailed on him to campaign against the Sasanids. Before crossing the Tigris to face Shapur, Constantius was determined to retake the important fortress of Bazabde. During the ensuing blockade, the Sasanids sallied several times from the city to destroy Roman battering rams and ballistae. With winter beginning, the area was flooded with heavy rains and Constantius' attacks were beaten back, he retreated from Bazabde into Syria and wintered in Antioch.

==== Campaigns of 361 ====
The following spring 361, Constantius crossed the Euphrates once more, arriving at Edessa. Unwilling to resume the blockade of Bazabde and fearing a costly siege, he sent his two generals, Arbetio and Agilo, to observe the motions of Shapur from the further bank of the Tigris to inform him when the latter should cross the river. Shapur, however, declined to venture over the Tigris and the entire summer of 361 was wasted in ineffectual maneuvering with each monarch on opposite banks of the river. Meanwhile, Constantius had requested reinforcements from Julian in Gaul, the Gallic legions, however, revolted and proclaimed Julian Augustus.

On account of the immediate Sasanid threat, Constantius was unable to directly respond to his cousin's usurpation, other than by sending missives in which he tried to convince Julian to resign the title of Augustus and be satisfied with that of Caesar. Constantius saw no alternative but to face the usurper, and yet the threat of an invasion by Shapur remained. Shapur, however, did not attempt another campaign that year. This temporary respite in hostilities allowed Constantius to turn his full attention to Julian.

The war ended indecisively with Constantius dying of fever on 5 October 361 at Mopsucrene.

== Sources ==
- Barnes, T. D. (1980). "Imperial Chronology, A. D. 337-350". Phoenix. 34 (2 (Summer)): 160–166. doi:10.2307/1087874. JSTOR 1087874.
- Blockley, R. C. (1988). "Ammianus on the Persian Invasion of AD 359". Phoenix. 42 (3 (Autumn)). doi:10.2307/1088346. JSTOR 1088346.
- Crawford, Peter (2016). Constantius II: Usurpers, Eunuchs, and the Antichrist. Pen & Sword.
- Daryaee, Touraj (2012). The Oxford Handbook of Iranian History. Oxford University Press. ISBN 978-0199732159.
- Daryaee, Touraj (2017). "ŠĀPUR II". Encyclopaedia Iranica.
- Dmitriev, Vladimir (2015). The 'Night Battle' of Singara: Whose Victory?. Historiai Swiat.=.
- Dodgeon, Michael H.; Lieu, Samuel N. C., eds. (2002). The Roman Eastern Frontier and the Persian Wars (AD 226-363). Routledge.
- Harrel, John S. (2016). The Nisibis War. Pen & Sword.
- Kulikowski, Michael (2016). The Triumph of Empire: The Roman World from Hadrian to Constantine. Harvard University Press. ISBN 978-0674659612.
- Lightfoot, C. S. (1988). "Facts and Fiction: The Third Siege of Nisibis (A.D. 350)". Historia: Zeitschrift für Alte Geschichte. Bd. 37, H. 1 1st Qtr. Franz Steiner Verlag.
- Patterson, Lee E. (2017). "Minority Religions in the Sasanian Empire: Suppression, Integration and Relations with Rome". In Sauer, Eberhard (ed.). Sasanian Persia: Between Rome and the Steppes of Eurasia. Edinburgh University Press.
- Potter, David S. (2004). The Roman Empire at bay, AD 189-395. Routledge.
- Pourshariati, Parvaneh (2008). Decline and Fall of the Sasanian Empire: The Sasanian-Parthian Confederacy and the Arab Conquest of Iran. London and New York: I.B. Tauris. ISBN 978-1845116453.
- Sellwood, D. (2011). "AMIDA". Encyclopaedia Iranica, Vol. I, Fasc. 9. p. 938.
- Smith II, Andrew M. (2013). Roman Palmyra: Identity, Community, and State Formation. Oxford University Press (USA). ISBN 978-0199861101.
- Southern, Patricia (2001). The Roman Empire from Severus to Constantine. Routledge. ISBN 978-0415239448.
- Taylor, Donathan (2016). Roman Empire at War: A Compendium of Roman Battles from 31 B.C. to A.D. 565. Pen & Sword.
