= Tamshapur =

Tamshapur (Middle Persian: Tahm-Šabuhr) was an Iranian marzban (general of a frontier province, "margrave") of Adiabene under the Sasanian king (shah) Shapur II (r. 309–379). Tamshapur is first mentioned in 357 as the first receiver of an unofficial peace measure of the Roman senator, Strategius Musonianus. He was later in contact with the Roman defector Antoninus and supported him at the court in Ctesiphon. In 359, Tamshapur led the soldiers of Shapur II at the siege of Amida, which resulted in a Sasanian victory.

== Sources ==
- Wiesehöfer, Josef (2018). "Tamshapur". In Nicholson, Oliver (ed.). The Oxford Dictionary of Late Antiquity. Oxford: Oxford University Press. ISBN 978-0-19-866277-8.
