= Sasanian navy =

Naval force of the Sasanian Empire

- Founder: Ardashir I (r. 212–224)
- Military leader: Navbed
- Political leader: Sasanian king
- Active regions: Indian Ocean basin (Persian Gulf, Arabian Sea, Red Sea), Mediterranean Sea
- Part of: Sasanian Empire

The Sasanian navy was the naval force of the Sasanian Empire active since its establishment. It operated in the Persian Gulf, the Arabian Sea, the Red Sea, and briefly in the Mediterranean Sea.

== Sources ==
Not much is known about the Sasanian navy, which never really became a major force. Information about the Sasanian navy appears mostly in oriental sources, i.e. works of Arab, Persian and Armenian authors. There is little information in the Roman/Byzantine sources, and almost no iconographic information.

== Organization and role ==
The Sasanian naval forces were established since the time of the empire's founder, Ardashir I.

Given that the coasts of the Persian Gulf were already firmly under rule of the Sasanians or their vassals, the main role of the Sasanian navy was to protect Sasanian economic interests, rather than to conduct military expeditions. According to V. A. Dmitriev, the role of the navy was to advance the military, political, and commercial influence of the empire throughout the northern waters of the Indian Ocean. The navy was mostly active in the Persian Gulf, the Red Sea, and the Arabian Sea. The Sasanians downplayed the development of their navy due to their geopolitical interests as well as the fact that their military was highly influenced by the land-based military of the Parthian Empire, and that, unlike the Achaemenids, the Sasanians failed to capture the ports of the Eastern Mediterranean.

The leader of the navy allegedly bore the title of Navbed.

== Vessels ==
The vessels used by the Sasanian military were exclusively transport landing ships for carrying land forces, and possibly also merchant ships for carrying cavalry. The dhow-type vessels were used in the Indian Ocean basin, while the Byzantine-style sailing-rowing dromons and chelandions were used in the Mediterranean, but only for transporting troops.

The Persians were able to construct large ships suited for long voyages as far as the marginal seas of the north of the Indian and west of the Pacific Oceans.

== Operational history ==
There were two distinct areas of operation for the Sasanian navy: the Indian Ocean basin (against the Arabs and the Ethiopians) and the Mediterranean (against the Byzantines).

The Sasanian navy played an important role in Ardashir I's conquest of the Arabian side of the Persian Gulf as well as in Shapur II's Arab campaign. Naval power reached its peak during the reign of Khosrow I (r. 531-579), who sent a force of eight ships (kashtīg) under Vahrez to conquer Yemen—each ship could carry 100 men. Six of the ships managed to reach Yemen safely. An attempt by Khosrow I to establish a Sasanian fleet in the Black Sea via the ports of Lazica in 540s, which was able to directly threaten the heart of the Byzantine Empire, was thwarted by the defeats at Petra and Phasis in the last stage of the Lazic War. During the climactic Byzantine–Sasanian War of 602–628, the Sasanian navy tried naval expeditions in the Mediterranean Sea—although not very successful, they managed to capture the island of Rhodes in 622/3 and several other islands in the eastern Aegean around the same time. Since the Sasanians did not have a fleet in the Mediterranean, it has been suggested that their forces were transported either by the captured Byzantine ships in the newly conquered ports (e.g. Alexandria, Antioch, and Rhodes) or by vessels built in Egyptian or Syrian shipyards especially for them. Later in that war, they were forced to rely on monoxyla of their allied Slavs in order to transport the 3,000 troops across the Bosphorus which they had promised the khagan of the Avars. The weakness of the Sasanian navy is considered a key factor in their failure to defeat the Byzantines in the last war between them.

After the Muslim conquest of Persia, the Sasanian navy forces joined the Muslim armies and participated in the wars against the Byzantines and elsewhere. For example, according to the Chinese source Old Book of Tang, Guangzhou was ravaged and burned during the joint naval expedition of the Arabs and the Persians in 758.

== Sources ==
- Bosworth, C. E. (1983). "ABNĀʾ". Encyclopaedia Iranica, Vol. I, Fasc. 3. pp. 226–228.
- Daryaee, Touraj (2009). Sasanian Persia: The Rise and Fall of an Empire. I.B.Tauris. pp. 1–240. ISBN 978-0857716668.
- Dmitriev, Vladimir (2017). "The Sasanian Navy revisited: An unwritten chapter in Iran's military history". International Journal of Maritime History. 29 (4): 727–737. doi:10.1177/0843871417726966. S2CID 158676495.
- Dmitriev, Vladimir (2019). "'They are in the habit of sailing in big crafts': what kinds of warships did the Sasanids use?". International Journal of Maritime History. 31 (2): 222–232. doi:10.1177/0843871419842050. S2CID 198712052.
- Greatrex, Geoffrey; Lieu, Samuel N. C. (2005). The Roman Eastern Frontier and the Persian Wars AD 363-628. Routledge. ISBN 978-1134756469.
- Howard-Johnston, J.D. (2006). East Rome, Sasanian Persia and the End of Antiquity: Historiographical and Historical Studies. Ashgate Publishing, Ltd. ISBN 978-0860789925.
- Kia, Mehrdad (2016). The Persian Empire: A Historical Encyclopedia [2 volumes]: A Historical Encyclopedia. ABC-CLIO. ISBN 978-1610693912.
- Nicolle, David (1996), Sassanian Armies: the Iranian Empire Early 3rd to Mid-7th Centuries AD, Stockport: Montvert, ISBN 978-1-874101-08-6
