= Strategius Musonianus =

Strategius Musonianus (Greek: Στρατήγιος Μουσονιανός; died c. 370) was a Roman senator who served in various civilian offices from the reign of Constantine I through to Constantius II.

Originally called Strategius, he received the nickname Musonianus from the emperor Constantine I, who was impressed by his skills as an interpreter. According to Ammianus Marcellinus, "when Constantine was closely investigating the different religious sects, Manichaeans and the like, and no suitable interpreter could be found, he chose Musonianus, as a person recommended to him as competent; and when he had done that duty skilfully, he wished him to be called Musonianus, whereas he had hitherto had the name of Strategius."

Musonianus is first mentioned around the year 326 as a comes in Antioch, with a rank of vir perfectissimus. Next in 343, he, along with Hesychius of Antioch, represented the emperor Constantius II at the Council of Sardica. It has been suggested that he may have been proconsul of the city of Constantinople (the precursor to the office of praefectus urbi of the city), occupying that post prior to 353.

In 353, Musonianus was serving as the proconsular governor of Achaea. During this year, he induced the Athenians to offer Libanius a chair of rhetoric at the Athenian Academy. Then from 354 to 358, he was the Praetorian Prefect of Oriens, initially under Constantius Gallus. He presided over the trial of the people involved in the riot and murder of Theophilus, consularis governor of Syria Coele, during which Musonianus was accused of condemning poor men who were nowhere near the incident, while the wealthy perpetrators were allowed to go free after being stripped of their property.

In 357, Musonianus entered into negotiations with the Sassanid Persian commander Tamshapur, asking him to approach Shapur II with a view of establishing a peace that would secure their mutual frontiers. The following year, Musonianus proposed that the philosopher Eustathius of Cappadocia be included in a delegation to Persia to continue negotiations with the Sassanid king. During his time as Praetorian Prefect, he also reorganised the fleet of navicularii (associations granted state privileges when engaged in export shipping) in the east. Sometime before 24 August 358, he had relinquished his role as Praetorian Prefect and went into retirement, residing in Constantinople. He had died by 11 February 371.

A friend of Libanius, Musonianus was a Christian and well versed in both Latin and Greek. According to Ammianus, although he was greedy and corrupt, he had a reputation as a competent governor – "a man intelligent in other respects and satisfactory to the provinces, mild also and well-spoken".
