= Pushtigban =

- Active: 224-644
- Allegiance: Sasanian Empire
- Type: Heavy cavalry
- Size: 1,000
- Headquarters: Ctesiphon
- Engagements: Battle of Samarra, Battle of Callinicum, unnamed others

The pushtigban was an elite military unit of the Sasanian Empire, charged with the protection of the Persian Emperor.

They were stationed during peacetime in the royal capital of Ctesiphon and were drawn from the best of the ranks of the Sasanian Savārān cavalry. They numbered 1000 men, under the command of the pushtigban-salar; in battle they fought mostly as cataphracts, heavily armed and armoured horsemen who would charge enemy positions with tremendous momentum.

There are allusions to the participation of this unit in sources describing the Shapur II's Arab campaign and Siege of Amida (359).

A sub-unit of pushtigban were the gyan-avspar, the "sacrificers of their lives" - the best of the pushtigban. The pushtigban fought with distinction and zeal befitting their name during Julian's invasion of Persia in the 4th century AD.

The pushtigban disappeared with the Muslim conquest of Persia, that led to the Fall of the Sasanian Empire.

== See also ==
- Immortals (Sasanian Empire)
- Cataphract

== Bibliography ==
- Farrokh, Kaveh (2005) Sassanian Elite Cavalry, AD224-642. Osprey Publishing
- Morony, Michael G. (2005) [1984]. Iraq After The Muslim Conquest. Gorgias Press LLC. ISBN 978-1-59333-315-7.
