= Battle of Nisibis =

The name Battle of Nisibis can refer to one of six battles fought near the city of Nisibis in northern Mesopotamia:

- Battle of Nisibis (217), in which the Parthians defeated the Romans
- Battle of Nisibis (541), in which the Sassanids under Nabedes beat the Byzantines under Belisarius

== See also ==
- Siege of Nisibis (disambiguation)
