= Antoninus (turncoat) =

Roman soldier and turncoat

Antoninus (Ancient Greek: Ἁντωνῖνος) was a member of the Household Cavalry under Emperor Constantius II, and later an advisor to the Sasanian king (shah) Shapur II. He played a key role in providing intelligence to the shah, culminating in the sack of Amida in 359 AD.

== Life ==
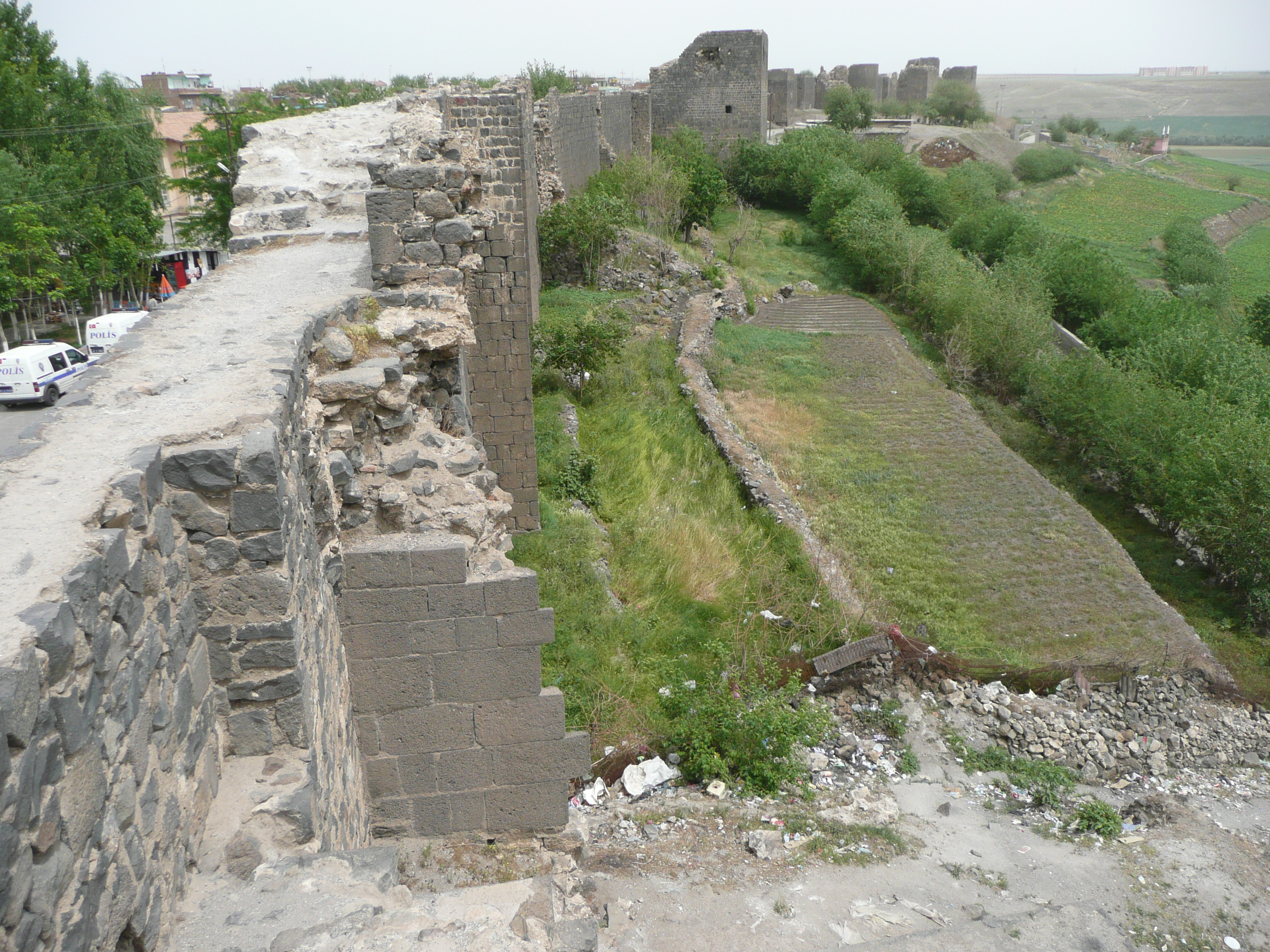
Walls of Amida, modern Diyarbakır, looking north from the eastern wall.

Ammianus Marcellinus is the only source on Antoninus:

"There was a certain Antoninus, at first a rich merchant, then an accountant in the service of the governor of Mesopotamia, and finally one of his body-guard, a man of experience and sagacity."

Ammianus then goes on to describe how Antoninus had been mistreated by the imperial authorities of Constantius II. Having grown tired of losing property and wealth to corruption, Antoninus decided to become turncoat. After contacting the Sasanian authorities, he crossed the Tigris river and joined the Sasanians. Antoninus later met Ursicinus in the turn of events leading to the siege of Amida. Ammianus (who was present) noted how Antoninus had come to adopt the dress and customs of the Sasanian court.

There is nothing else known about Antoninus' life, aside from the high position in the court of Shapur II. This may in part have been because he spoke both Greek and Latin.
