= Legio V Parthica =

Roman legion

- Country: Roman Empire; Byzantine Empire
- Type: Roman legion
- Garrison/HQ: Amida, Mesopotamia
- Nickname(s): Parthica, "Parthian" (archaism)
- Engagements: Siege of Amida

Legio V Parthica (the "Fifth Parthian Legion") was a legion of the Roman Empire (and later the Byzantine Empire) garrisoned in Amida, Mesopotamia, established by the Roman emperor Diocletian (284–305), who reorganized the eastern frontier. The legion is described by the historian Ammianus Marcellinus. The cognomen "Parthica" was an archaism, as the Parthian Empire was already replaced by the Sasanian Empire at the time of the establishment of the legion.

In 359, Amida was besieged by the Sasanian forces under Shapur II and their allies. Although V Parthica was reinforced by six more legions, the city eventually fell. V Parthica was probably not re-established later, as its name is absent in the document Notitia Dignitatum.

== See also ==
- List of Roman legions
