= Battle of Singara (344) =

Battle between Roman and Persian forces

- Part of the Perso-Roman wars of 337–361
Date	344 CE
Location	Singara, Mesopotamia
Result	Disputed

Belligerents
Sasanian Empire	Roman Empire

Commanders and leaders
Shapur II; Prince Narseh †	Constantius II

Strength
Unknown	Unknown, but larger

Casualties and losses
Heavy	Heavy

The Battle of Singara was fought in 344 between Roman and Sasanian Persian forces. The Romans were led in person by Emperor Constantius II, while the Persian army was led by King Shapur II of Persia. It is the only one of the nine pitched battles recorded to have been fought in a war of over twenty years, marked primarily by indecisive siege warfare, of which any details have been preserved. Although the Persian forces prevailed on the battlefield, both sides suffered heavy casualties.

== Background ==
When Shapur II, who ascended to the throne of the Sasanian Empire in 309 (at the time an unborn infant), came of age and took in hand the administration of his kingdom, he dedicated himself to a lifelong mission of restoring his country's military power, and avenging its recent defeats by the Romans and Saracens. After thoroughly subduing the Lakhmid Arabs rebellion in the south, he directed his attention towards Rome, his main enemy, in 337. The sacking of a Sasanian city and the deportation of its population may have led to the intervention of Shapur II. He began by recapturing Armenia. and then advanced in his first campaign against Constantius II in the following year, however, the Roman defensive lines resisted and the Persian forces made limited progress.

== Battle ==
The Persian troops initially retreated and the Romans broke into the Persian camp. They inflicted heavy casualties including Shapur's son Prince Narseh. However, the Persians counter-attacked and drove the Romans away with heavy losses.

== Outcome and aftermath ==
The result of the battle is disputed. Some sources say the battle resulted in a Sasanian victory, another states a Roman victory. Samuel Lieu and Dominic Montserrat state that both sides claimed victory but ultimately the battle was indecisive, with both armies sustaining heavy casualties.

The death of Shapur's son did not facilitate an amicable settlement of the conflict, and the war dragged on for several years. Shapur, notwithstanding the extent of his victory, proved unable to utilize the event to any further advantage. Two years later, he became bogged down in another siege of Nisibis, but was then obliged to break off the war to meet the threat of nomadic barbarian invasions in Sogdiana in the far east. The war resumed in 359 CE, but ended with no conclusive result. In 363 it was taken up energetically by Julian, who was successful until the battle of Samarra where he was defeated and killed. After his death, the Roman army suffered a decisive defeat. His successor, Jovian, was forced to cede extensive Roman territory in the treaty of Dura, and thus Shapur's ambitions were accomplished.

== See also ==
- Perso-Roman wars of 337–361
- Siege of Amida

== Sources ==
- Barnes, T. D. (1980). "Imperial Chronology, A. D. 337-350". Phoenix. 34 (2 (Summer)): 163. doi:10.2307/1087874. JSTOR 1087874.
- Daryaee, Touraj (2017). "ŠĀPUR II". Encyclopaedia Iranica. "The encroachment of the nomadic tribes in Central Asia forced Šāpur II to turn his attention to the East (Chronicle of Arbela, p. 85), and the war with Rome ended in stalemate by 350."
- Dmitriev, Vladimir (2015). "The 'Night Battle' of Singara: Whose Victory?". Historiai Swiat. Rochester, NY: 68. SSRN 2648954.
- Dodgeon, Michael H.; Lieu, Samuel N. C. (1994). The Roman Eastern Frontier and the Persian Wars (AD 226-363): A Documentary History. Psychology Press. p. 188. ISBN 9780415103176.
- Frye, Richard N. (2005). "The Sassanians". In Bowman, Alan K.; Garnsey, Peter; Cameron, Averil (eds.). The Cambridge Ancient History. Vol. 12, The Crisis of Empire, AD 193-337. Cambridge University Press. pp. 461–480. ISBN 9780521301992.
- Hunt, David (2007). "The successors of Constantine". In Cameron, Averil; Garnsey, Peter (eds.). The Cambridge Ancient History. Vol. 13: The Late Empire, AD 337-425. Cambridge University Press. pp. 1–43. "In the one notable exception, the massed conflict before the fortress of Singara in 344, a Roman victory was lost through the troops' over-enthusiasm to prolong the fighting into the night, and to pursue the enemy in disarray against the emperor's orders."
- Lieu, Samuel; Montserrat, Dominic (1995). From Constantine to Julian: Pagan and Byzantine Views: A Source History. Routledge.
- Taylor, Donathan (2016). Roman Empire at War: A Compendium of Roman Battles from 31 B.C. to A.D. 565. Pen and Sword. p. 166. ISBN 9781473869110.
