= Aelianus (comes) =

Roman army officer

Count Aelianus
- Native name: Ancient Greek: Κόμης Αιλιανός; Latin: Aelianus comes
- Died: 359

Count Aelianus (Latin: Aelianus comes; Ancient Greek: Κόμης Αιλιανός; died 359 AD) was the chief Roman officer in charge of the defense of Amida during the siege of 359 by Shah Shapur II.

Very little is known about his life, except that he was noted by Ammianus Marcellinus as being a member of the Portectors Domesticus in 348 when he led new recruits (the praeventores and the Superventores) in an attack on the Sassanids who were laying siege to the Roman city of Singara. By 359 Aelianus had risen to the rank of comes rei militaris and was in command of the Roman Trans-Tigris forces. During the Siege of Amida he was in command of the defences of the fortress-city. After the capture and sack of Amida, he was gibbeted by the victorious Sasanians along with his tribunes.

He was mentioned in the earlier books of Ammianus Marcellinus (books 1-13), but these are lost.
