= Siege of Amida (359) =

Siege undertaken by Sasanian Persia

- Part of the Perso-Roman wars of 337–361
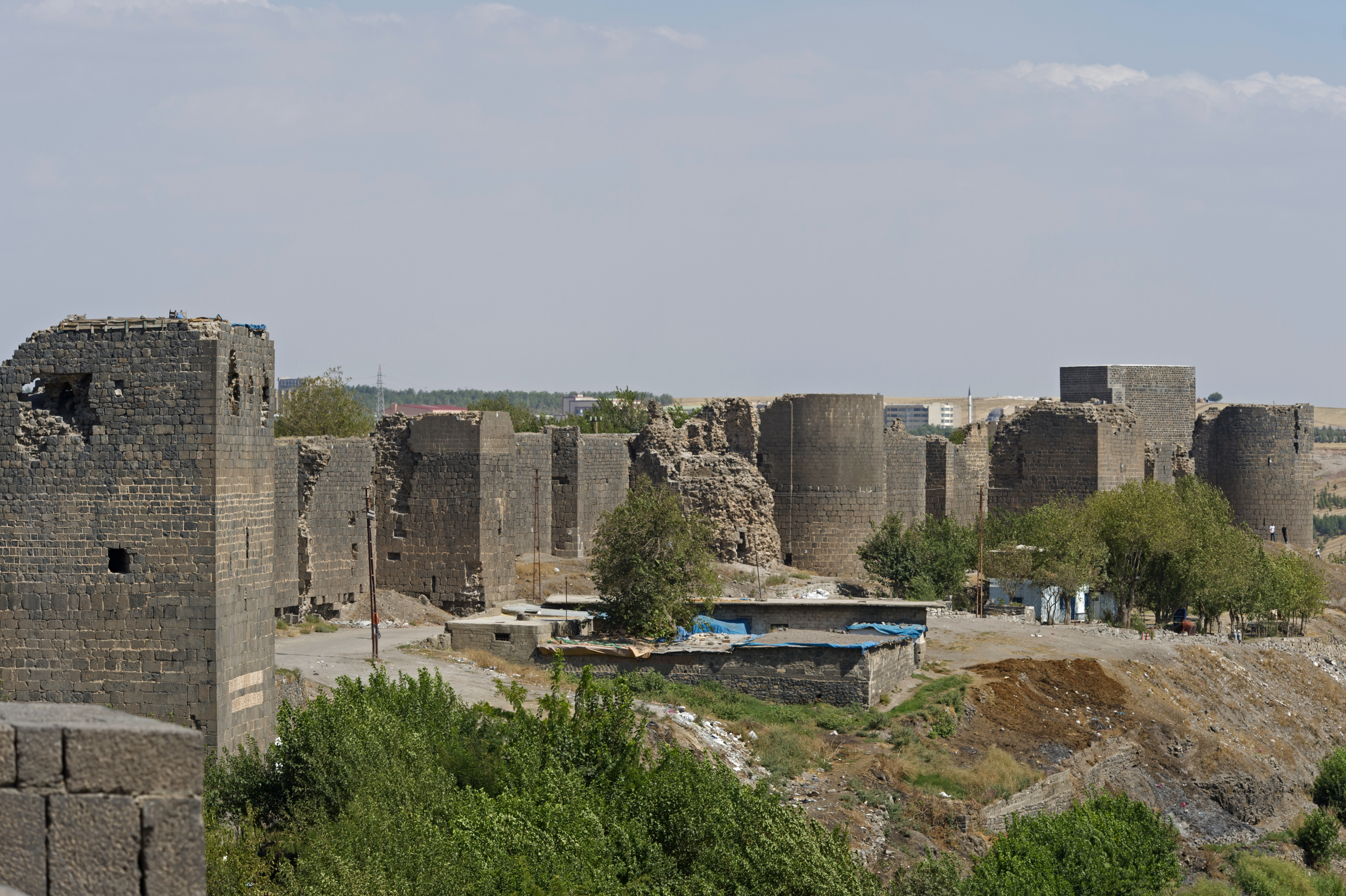
- The walls of Amida, built by Constantius II before the siege of 359
Date	359 AD
Location	Amida, Mesopotamia (modern-day Diyarbakır, Turkey) 37°55′N 40°13′E
Result	Sasanian victory
Territorial changes	Sasanian forces capture Amida

Belligerents
Sasanian Empire and allies	Roman Empire

Commanders and leaders
Shapur II or Peroz; Tamshapur; Grumbates; Urnayr	Aelianus (executed); Sabinianus; Ursicinus

Units involved
Sasanian army Xionites; Gelani; Albani; Segestani	Legio V Parthica and an unnamed cavalry unit (garrison); Legio XXX Ulpia; A detachment of Legio X Fretensis; Tricensimani; Decimani; Superventores and Praeventores (light cavalry); Comites Sagittarii (Household mounted archers); Magnentiaci and Decentiaci (legions from Gaul loyal to Magnentius)

Strength
c. 100,000	20,000–120,000 *est. 5,300 soldiers

Casualties and losses
c. 30,000 dead	Most defenders, some citizens, some refugees from countryside
- Location of the Siege of Amida Amida (Turkey)

The siege of Amida was a military investment of the Roman fortified frontier city of Amida (modern Diyarbakır, Turkey) by the Sasanian Empire. It took place in AD 359 when the Sasanian army under king Shapur II invaded the eastern provinces of the Roman Empire. Shapur wanted to exploit the absence of the Roman Emperor Constantius II who was overseeing affairs in the western part of the Empire. The city fell after a siege of 73 days.

== Background ==
Ammianus Marcellinus, a Roman army officer, provided a vivid description of the siege in his work (Res Gestae). Ammianus served on the staff of Ursicinus, the Magister Equitum (master of horse) of the East, during the events of the siege.

=== Persian ===
When Shapur II took control of the Sasanian Empire, he sought to regain old territories previously lost to the Roman Empire. After crushing the Arabs in the south, Shapur II had to fight for a decade against invaders called the Xionites. He was successful in his efforts, asserting his dominance over the invaders and securing his eastern borders. The Xionites were forced to conclude a peace, and their king, Grumbates, accompanied Shapur II in the war against the Romans. In 358 the Romans had failed to dissuade Shapur from attacking Mesopotamia, so the next year Shapur decided to invade. Shapur besieged Amida in 359.

=== Roman ===
Emperor Constantius II had increasingly been doubting the loyalty of General Ursicinus. As a result, he did not give him command of the Roman forces in the East, and instead gave it to Sabinianus. Ursicinus served as Magister Equitum (Master of Horse) while Sabinianus held the rank of Magister Peditum (Master of Foot) of the East. As events unfolded, Ursicinus became the 'de facto' commanding general of the Limitanei armies of Mesopotamia and Osrhoene, while Sabinianus continued as commander of Comitatus (the Field Army) of the East.

As news of the Persian invasion spread, the civilian population of the region began to panic:

"Dispatch riders were sent at once to Cassian, the general of Mesopotamiam and Euphronius, then governor of the province, with orders to compel the country folk [farmers] to move with their families and all their livestock to places of safety. Carrhae was to be evacuated immediately, because of the weakness of its fortifications, and the whole country set on fire (see:scorched earth), to deprive the enemy of a source of fodder."

— Ammianus Marcellinus, Res Gestae, 18.7

Several Roman legions gathered at Amida. These included: Legio XXX Ulpia Victrix, Magnentius, Decentius, Superventores, Praeventores and a detachment of Legio X Fretensis. The garrison of Amida itself consisted of Legio V Parthica supported by an unidentified cavalry regiment. Ursicinus probably planned to use Amida as a base of operations against the Persian invasion.

== Preliminaries of the siege ==
Shapur's plan was to bypass difficult fortress cities like Nisibis and march straight into Syria. The Sassanid Royal Army crossed the Tigris and blockaded or stormed Singara. In response, Ursicinus ordered the Comes Aelianus with five legions to Amida. The Romans wanted to use the city as a base to strike at the Sassanids if they besieged Nisibis or to attack their lines of communication and supply if they moved westwards towards Syria. Ursicinus moved his headquarters to Amida and sent out scouting parties. The Sassanids suddenly marched to Amida, where their vanguard almost captured Ursicinus when he rode out with the cavalry wanting to make sure the bridges across the Euphrates were broken down. After a protracted fight, Ursicinus' cavalry was driven towards the Tigris with Ursicinus and a few men barely escaping. When Shapur and the main army approached Amida, the Sassanids were provoked into attacking the city. This came about when the son of Grumbates, while inspecting the defences of Amida, was shot and killed with an arrow shot by the city garrison. Ammianus described how Grumbates, outraged at his son's death, demanded revenge from the Romans: he compares the death to that of Patroclus at Troy. The Sassanids began the attack with siege towers and attempted to take the city quickly, but were largely unsuccessful.

== Siege ==
According to Ammianus Marcellinus

The king himself [Shapur II], mounted upon a charger and overtopping the others, rode before the whole army, wearing in place of a diadem a golden image of a ram's head set with precious stones, distinguished too by a great retinue of men of the highest rank and of various nations. But it was clear that he would merely try the effect of a conference on the defenders of the walls, since by the advice of Antoninus he was in haste to go elsewhere.

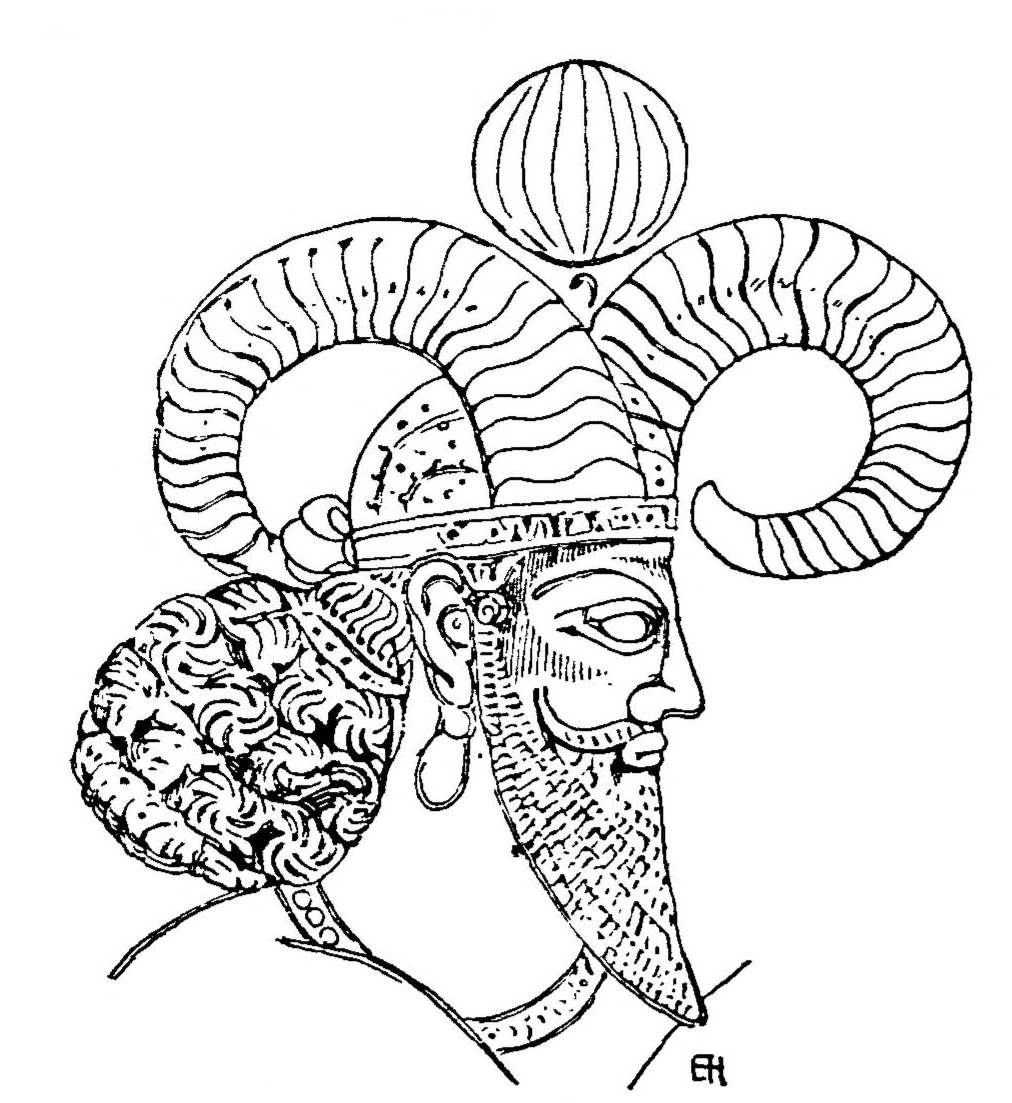
A ram horns headdress, as appears on a silver plate of a Sasanian ruler of the east of the Empire. The Kidarite Pērōz also displays such a headdress on his coinage. Hermitage Museum.

According to historian Khodadad Rezakhani, the ruler described by Ammianus Marcellinus, who is not named specifically as Shapur II, could alternatively be the Kidarite ruler Peroz. In particular, Shapur's traditional headgear is a crenellated crown, and is very different from the one described by Ammianus Marcellinus. The headgear with ram's horn would rather correspond to that of Peroz as seen on many of his coins in the Sasanian style. Ammianus Marcellinus also mentions that the king, whom he assumes to be Shapur, was called "Saansaan" and "Pirosen" by the Persians, which could actually refer to "Šāhanšāh Pērōz", the ruler of the eastern Hunnic tribes (Chionites, Gelani, and Sagistani).

Ammianus Marcellinus continues with the account of how he reached the safety of the city just as the Sassanids were descending on the city:

I myself, having taken a direction apart from that of my comrades, was looking around to see what to do, when Verennianus, one of the guard, came up with an arrow in his thigh; and while at the earnest request of my colleague I was trying to pull it out, finding myself surrounded on all sides by the advancing Persians, I made up for the delay by breathless speed and aimed for the city, which from the point where we were attacked lay high up and could be approached only by a single very narrow ascent; and this was made still narrower by mills which had been built on the cliffs for the purpose of making the paths. Here, mingled with the Persians, who were rushing to the higher ground with the same effort as ourselves, we remained motionless until sunrise of the next day, so crowded together that the bodies of the slain, held upright by the throng, could nowhere find room to fall, and that in front of me a soldier with his head cut in two, and split into equal halves by a powerful sword stroke, was so pressed on all sides that he stood erect like a stump.

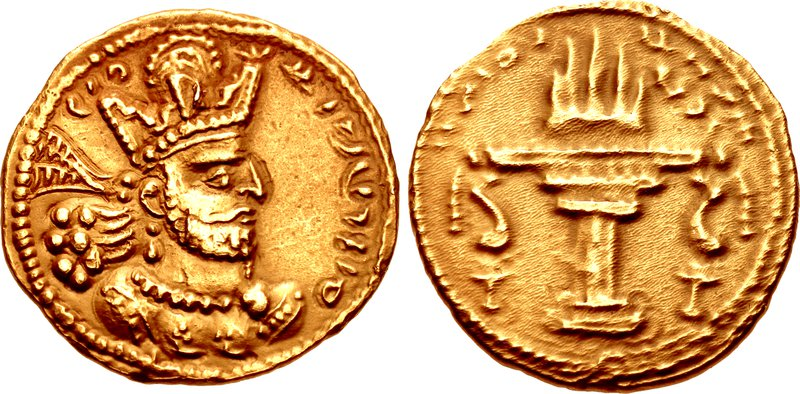
Shapur II led the siege against Amida.

The siege took 73 days. Shapur II attempted to capture the city several times but every time it failed. Early in the siege a company of 70 elite Persian foot-archers by aid of a Roman renegade gained entrance to a tower on the south side of the city, which was placed on the bank of the Tigris. The archers then fired precision shots toward the city's interior in coordination with Shapur II's general assault outside the city. The Romans recaptured the tower as the archers ran out of arrows and killed them. At the same time, repeated assaults on the walls were repulsed by the garrison, and many of the Persian siege towers were set on fire. During the siege, plague broke out in Amida but ended after ten days by a light rain.

Cavalry forces were used during the siege, with Albanian cavalry stationing to the city's north, the Sakas of Sakastan to the west, the Chionites to the east, and Shapur II and his "Royal Escort" (possibly the pushtigban) to the south. War elephants were employed to the city's west. The Romans reportedly countered the elephants by hurling flames against their skins. Ammianus mentions the assaults by Shapur II and his cavalry force against the gates, noting that how close the king was to the defenders.

At one point two Gallic legions which were stationed in the city, willing to prove their courage in the fight, and infuriated by the sight of Roman captives being hauled in to the enemy camp by Persian raiders who were devastating the country, persuaded their commanders to allow them to carry out a night attack on the Persian camp. Although a slight noise warned the Persians in time, the Gauls inflicted heavy casualties before retiring in good order within the walls.

Although all their siege towers were destroyed by the employment of the Roman scorpions, they were able to erect mounds of earth against the walls, which the Romans countered by building higher mounds within the circuit of the city, from which to aim their missiles against the Persians on the mounds below. Ultimately, one of the improvised towers of the Romans collapsed under the repeated shocks of the Persian missile-engines. The Persians were thus able to extend their mounds to the ramparts and scale the battlements of the city. Shapur's army made its long-delayed entrance into the fortress, the obstinacy of which was punished by a promiscuous massacre. Aelianus the count, who had directed the defense, with all his principal officers who survived, were subjected to crucifixion.

== Outcome ==
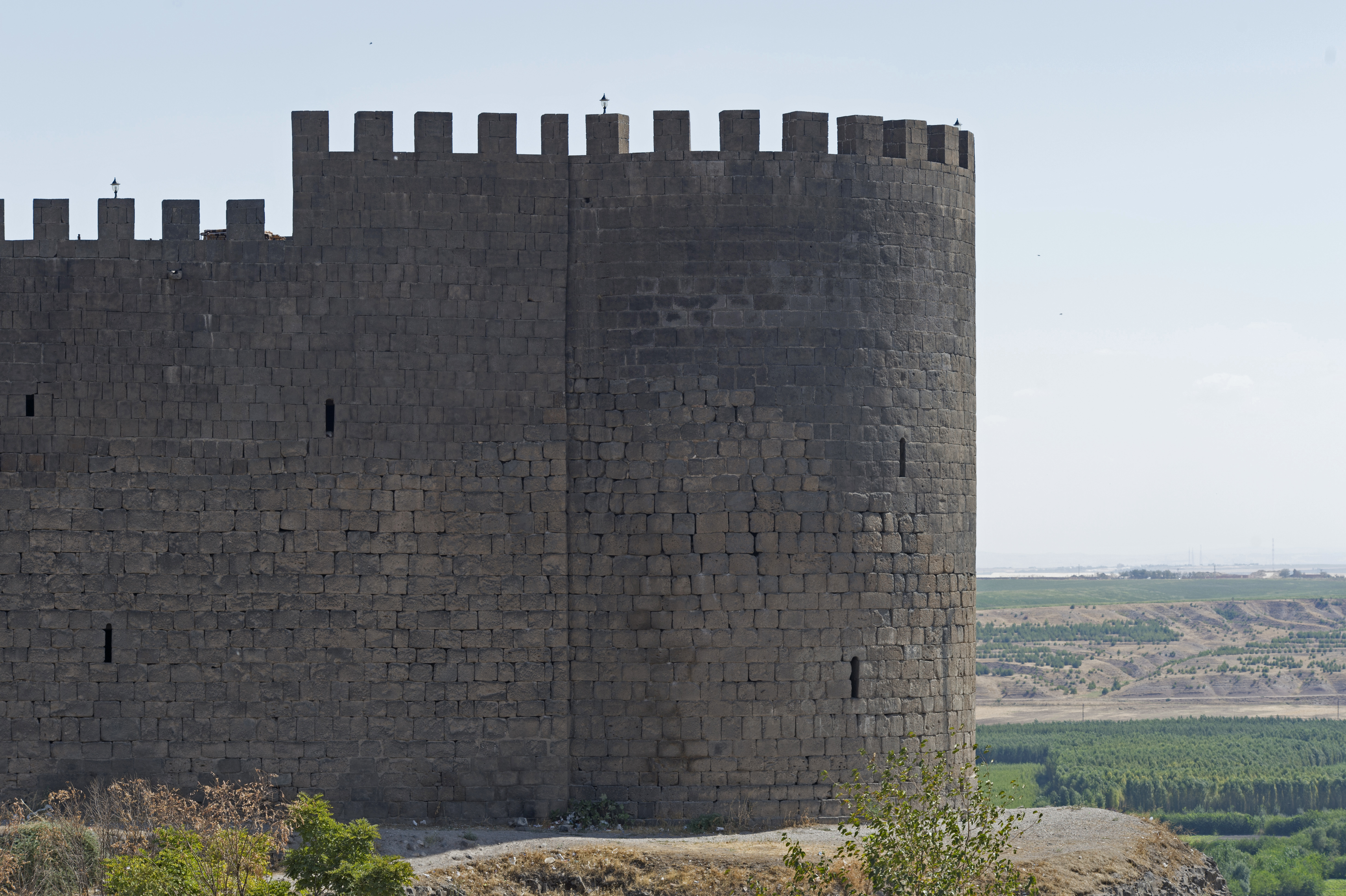
Walls of Amida fortress.

After the capture of the city, most of the Roman leaders were executed, the city was sacked, the residential areas were destroyed, and the population was deported to Khuzestan province in Persia. Autumn having arrived, the Persians could advance no further. Aside from having spent the campaign season in the reduction of a single city, Shapur II had lost as many as 30,000 in the siege, and his barbarian allies from the east deserted him due to the heavy casualties.

In the following year (360), Shapur II renewed his invasion and captured the key border fortresses Bezabde and Singara, killing and capturing five entire Roman legions, but again suffering high casualties. In spring of the next year Constantius II who had spent the winter in Constantinople recruiting his forces, finally arrived in the east. Shapur's strategy was to refortify and hold on to the fortresses he had captured and avoid a pitched battle. Constantius directed his efforts towards retaking Bezabde, but met an unexpectedly strong resistance; diverted from his purpose by the revolt of Julian which had arisen meanwhile in Gaul, Constantius abandoned the siege at the approach of winter, heading west. He died shortly at Antioch of a fever.

At the accession of Julian, Shapur desired peace. In 363, Emperor Julian, at the head of a strong army, invaded Persia and advanced to take Ctesiphon. But despite a good start to the campaign he was killed in battle on the retreat. His successor Jovian signed a treaty of peace, by which the districts on the Tigris and Nisibis (totalling five Roman provinces) were ceded to the Persians and the Romans relinquished the right to interfere in Armenia.

== See also ==
- Persian wars of Constantius II

== Sources ==
- Blockley, R. C. (1988). "Ammianus Marcellinus on the Persian invasion of A.D. 359". Phoenix. 42 (3 Autumn): 244–260. doi:10.2307/1088346. JSTOR 1088346.
- Chegini, N.N.; Nikitin, A.V. (1996). "Sassanian Iran- economy, society, arts and crafts". In Litvinsky, B.A.; Guang-da, Zhang; Samghabadi, R. Shabani (eds.). History of Civilizations of Central Asia: The Crossroads of Civilizations. Vol. III. UNESCO.
- Crawford, Peter (2016). Constantius II: Usurpers, Eunuchs, and the Antichrist. Pen & Sword. p. 169.
- Daryaee, Touraj (2008). Sasanian Iran (224-651 CE): Portrait of a Late Antique Empire. Mazda Publishers.
- Farrokh, Kaveh; Maksymiuk, Katarzyna; Garcia, Javier Sanchez (2018). The Siege of Amida (359 CE). Archeobooks. ISBN 978-83-7051-887-5.
- Greenwood, David Neal (2021). Julian and Christianity: Revisiting the Constantinian Revolution. Cornell University Press.
- Harrel, John (2016). The Nisibis War: The Defence of the Roman East AD 337–363. Pen & Sword Military.
- Lieu, Samuel; Montserrat, Dominic (1995). From Constantine to Julian: Pagan and Byzantine Views: A Source History. Routledge.
- Matthews, John (1989). The Roman Empire of Ammianus. Johns Hopkins University Press.
