= Grumbates =

4th century king of the Xionites

- Military career
- Allegiance: Chionitae
- Rank: King
- Conflicts: Siege of Amida in 359 CE

Grumbates or Krumbates was a king of the Chionitae, probably of the Kidarites tribe, an ancient nomadic tribe of Transoxiana.

== Etymology ==
The exact origin of his name is not fully known. Hyun Jin Kim etymologized his name as *Qurum-pat, "ruling prince"; containing Iranian element pat "chieftain, ruler" and Turkic qurum "rule, leadership, administration" which is attested in the name of Bulgarian khan Krum.

== Attacks on the Sasanian Empire ==
The Kidarite king Grumbates mentioned by Ammianus Marcellinus was a cause of much concern to the Persians. Between 353 AD and 358 CE, the Xionites under Grumbates attacked in the eastern frontiers of Shapur II's empire along with other nomad tribes. After a prolonged struggle they were forced to conclude a peace, and their king Grumbates accompanied Shapur II in the war against the Romans.

== Alliance with Shapur II against the Romans ==
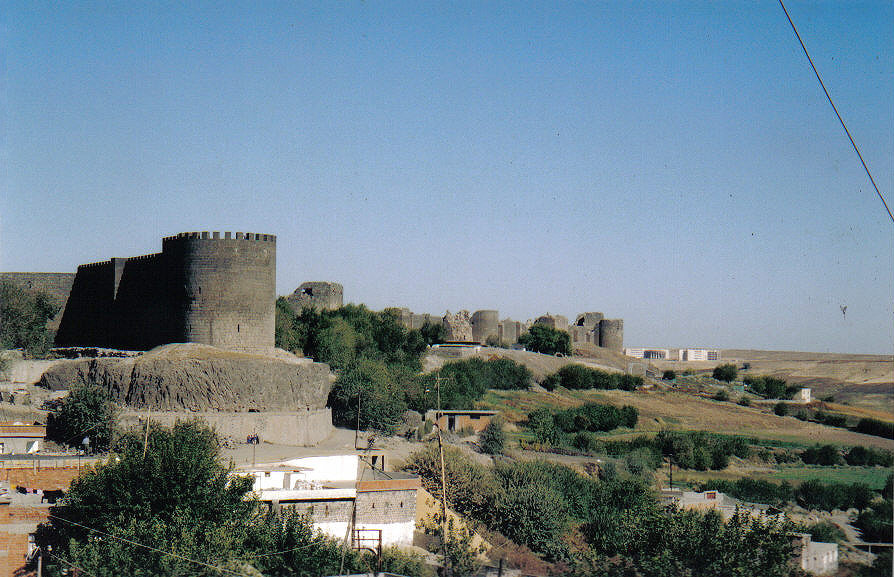
The walls of Amida in modern-day Turkey, built by Constantius II before the Siege of Amida of 359 AD, in which Grumbates participated. Ammianus himself was present in the city until a day before its fall.

Grumbates thus participated in the Siege of Amida in 359 AD as an ally of Shapur II. His participation to the Sasanian campaign in the Eastern Caspian lands are described by Ammianus Marcellinus, who was inside the fortress of Amida at the time:

"We saw below us the whole circuit of the lands filled with innumerable troops with the king (Shapur II) leading the way, glittering in splendid attire. Close by him on the left went Grumbates, king of the Chionitae, a man of moderate strength, it is true, and with shrivelled limbs, but of a certain greatness of mind and distinguished by the glory of many victories."

— Ammianus Marcellinus, 18.6.22.

The son of Grumbates, while inspecting the defences of Amida, was shot and killed with an arrow shot by the city garrison. Ammianus described how the Grumbates, outraged at his son's death, demanded revenge from the Romans: he compares the death to that of Patroclus at Troy. The Sassanids began the attack with siege towers and attempted to take the city hastily, but were largely unsuccessful. Unable to gain a quick victory, Shapur II had to commit to capturing Amida in order to appease his ally Grumbates.

And so, at the first dawn of day, Grumbates, king of the Chionitae, wishing to render courageous service to his lord, boldly advanced to the walls with a band of active attendants; but a skilful observer caught sight of him as soon as he chanced to come within range of his weapon, and discharging a ballista, pierced both cuirass and breast of Grumbates' son, a youth just come to manhood, who was riding at his father's side and was conspicuous among his companions for his height and his handsome person.

— Ammianus Marcellinus, 19.1

== Sources ==
- Turks in Transoxiana, Richard N. Frye
- Richard N. Frye, Turks in Transoxiana
