= Xionites =

4th–6th-century Bactrian-speaking nomadic people of Central Asia

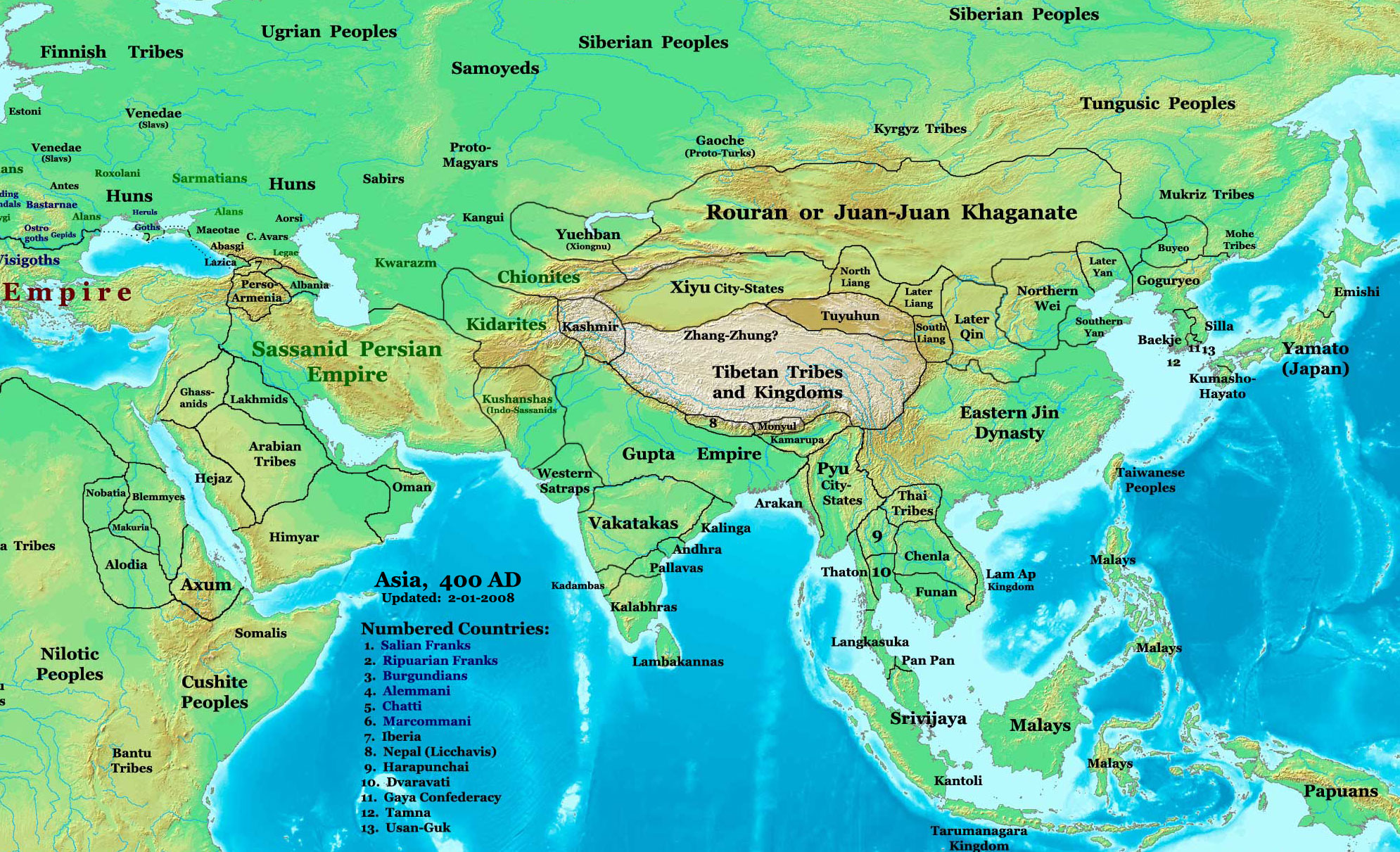
Asia in 400 AD, showing the Xionites ("Chionites") and their neighbors.

Xionites, (Note: Middle Persian: Inscriptional Pahlavi: 𐭧𐭩𐭥𐭭, Psalter Pahlavi: 𐮇𐮈𐮅𐮌, Manichaean: 𐫍𐫏𐫇𐫗, romanized: Xyōn (Note: Middle Persian pronunciation [ˈxjoːn]) New Persian: خیون, romanized: Xiyōn (Note: New Persian pronunciation [xi.ˈjoːn]) Avestan: X́iiaona- Sogdian: xwn) Khionites, Chionites, (Note: /ˈxjoʊnaɪts, ˈxiː-/ KHYOH-nyts, KHEE-oh-nyts) or Chionitae were a nomadic people in the Central Asian regions of Transoxiana and Bactria.

The Xionites appear to be synonymous with the Ḥūna peoples of classical/medieval India, and possibly also the Huns of European late antiquity, who were in turn linked onomastically to the Xiongnu in Chinese history.

They were first mentioned by the Roman historian Ammianus Marcellinus who was in Bactria during 356–357 AD; he described the Chionitæ as living with the Kushans. Ammianus indicates that the Xionites had previously lived in Transoxiana and, after entering Bactria, became vassals of the Kushans, were influenced culturally by them and had adopted the Bactrian language. They had attacked the Sassanid Empire, but later under the leadership of Grumbates, served as mercenaries in the Persian Sassanian army.

The Xionites seem to have been made up of two main subgroups, which were known in the Iranian languages by names such as Karmir Xyon and Spet Xyon. The prefixes karmir ("red") and speta ("white") likely refer to Central Asian traditions in which particular colours symbolised the cardinal points. The Karmir Xyon were known in European sources as the Kermichiones or "Red Huns", and some scholars have identified them with the Kidarites and/or Alchon. The Spet Xyon or "White Huns" appear to have been known in India by the cognate Shweta-Huna (Sanskrit: श्वेतहूण, romanized: Śvēta-Hūṇa, lit. 'White Hūṇas'), and are often identified, controversially, with the Hephthalites.

== Origins and culture ==
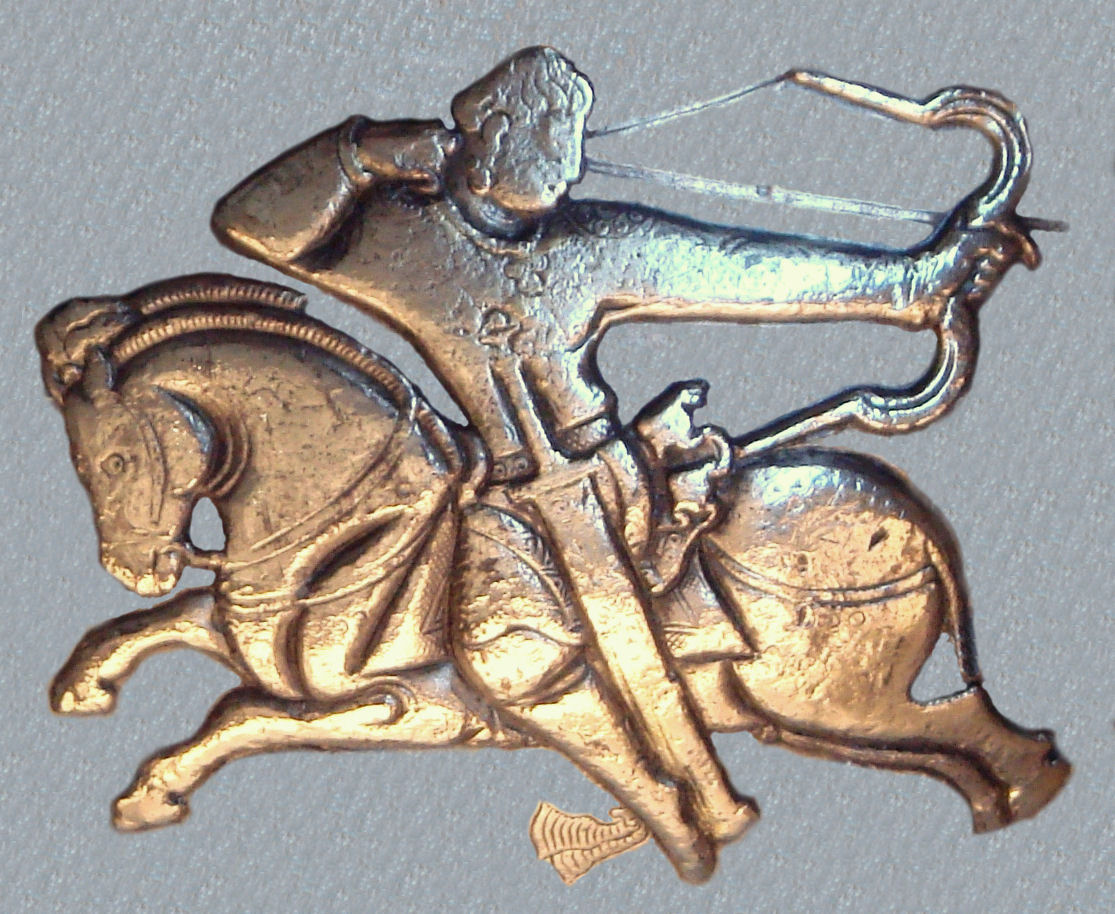
Alchon Hun horseman on the so-called "Hephthalite bowl" in the British Museum, 460–479 CE.

The original culture of the Xionites and their geographical urheimat are uncertain. They appear to have originally followed animist religious beliefs, which mixed later with varieties of Buddhism and Shaivism. It is difficult to determine their ethnic composition.

Differences between the Xionites, the Huns who invaded Europe in the 4th century, and the Turks were emphasised by Carlile Aylmer Macartney (1944), who suggested that the name "Chyon", originally that of an unrelated people, was "transferred later to the Huns owing to the similarity of sound". The Chyon who appeared in the 4th century, in the steppes on the northeastern frontier of Persia were probably a branch of the Huns that appeared shortly afterwards in Europe. The Huns appear to have attacked and conquered the Alans, then living between the Urals and the Volga about 360 AD, and the first mention of the Chyon was in 356 AD.

At least some Turkic tribes were involved in the formation of the Xionites, despite their later character as an Eastern Iranian people, according to Richard Nelson Frye (1991): "Just as later nomadic empires were confederations of many peoples, we may tentatively propose that the ruling groups of these invaders were, or at least included, Turkic-speaking tribesmen from the east and north, although most probably the bulk of the people in the confederation of Chionites... spoke an Iranian language.... This was the last time in the history of Central Asia that Iranian-speaking nomads played any role; hereafter all nomads would speak Turkic languages".

The proposition that the Xionites probably originated as an Iranian tribe was put forward by Wolfgang Felix in Encyclopedia Iranica (1992).

In 2005, As-Shahbazi suggested that they were originally a Hunnish people who had mixed with Iranian tribes in Transoxiana and Bactria, where they adopted the Kushan-Bactrian language. Likewise, Peter B. Golden wrote that the Chionite confederation included earlier Iranian nomads as well as Proto-Mongolic and Turkic elements.

== History ==
The defeat of the Xiongnu in 89 CE by Han dynasty forces at the Battle of Ikh Bayan and subsequent Han campaigns against them, led by Ban Chao may have been a factor in the ethnogenesis of the Xionites and their migration into Central Asia.

Xionite tribes reportedly organised themselves into four main hordes: "Black" or northern (beyond the Jaxartes), "Blue" or eastern (in Tianshan), "White" or western (possibly the Hephthalites), around Khiva, and the "Red" or southern (Kidarites and/or Alchon), south of the Oxus. Artefacts found from the area they inhabited dating from their period indicate their totem animal seems to have been the (rein)deer. The Xionites are best documented in southern Central Asia from the late 4th century AD until the mid-5th century AD.

=== Chionite rulers of Chach ===
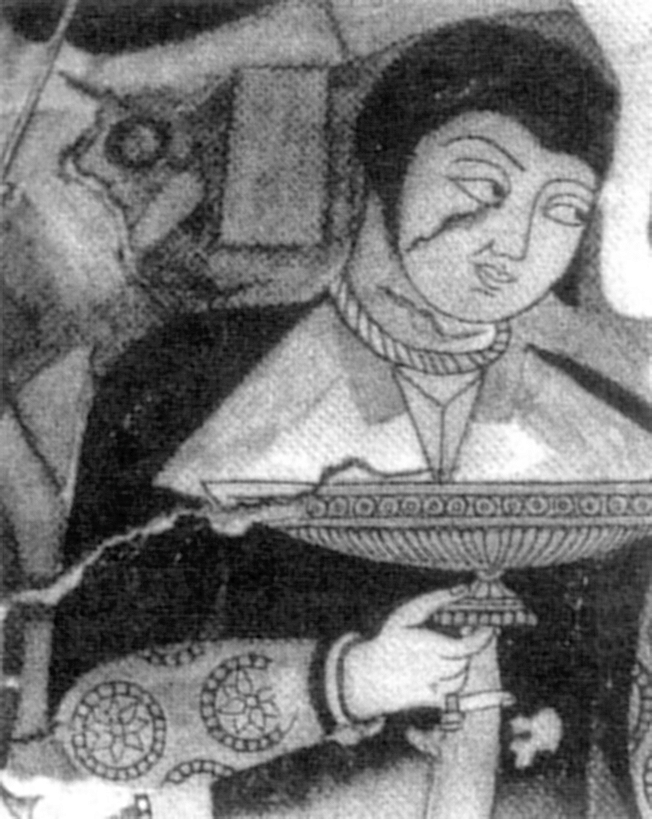
Mural of a man, from Balalyk Tepe, with an appearance similar to that on the coinage of the Chionites of Chach. 5th–7th century CE.

Some Chionites are known to have ruled in Chach (modern Tashkent), at the foot of the Altai Range, between the middle of the 4th century CE to the 6th century CE. A special type of coinage has been attributed to them, where they appear in portraits as diademed kings, facing right, with a tamgha in the shape of an X, and a circular Sogdian legend. They also often appear with a crescent over the head. It has been suggested that the facial characteristics and the hairstyle of these Chionite rulers as they appear on their coinage, are similar to those appearing on the murals of Balalyk Tepe further south.

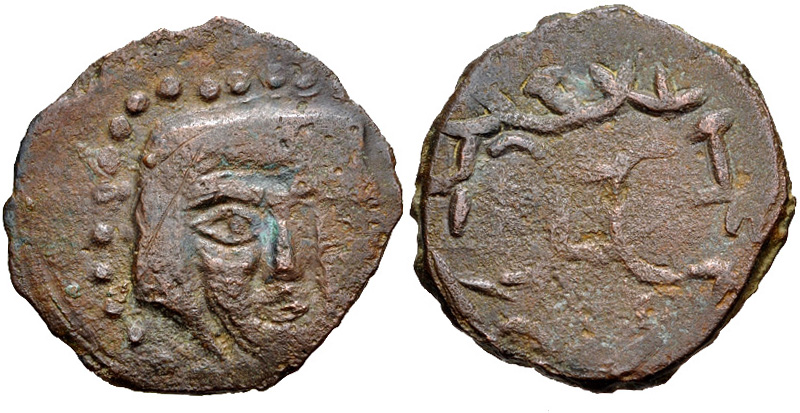
Chionite coinage of Chach

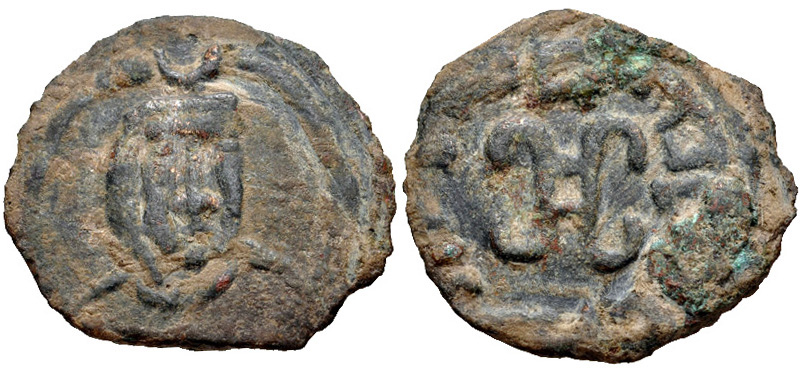
Chionite coinage of Chach

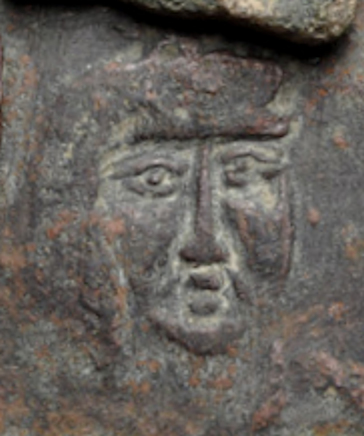
Portrait on a coin of Chach.

=== Kidarites ===
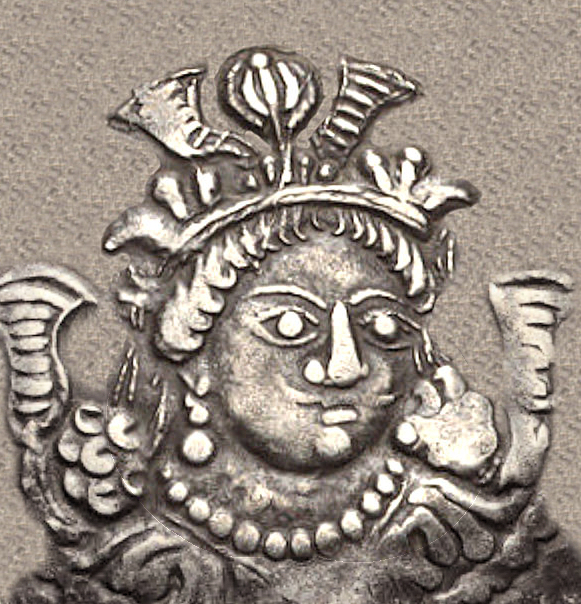
Portrait of Kidarites king Kidara, c. 350–386 AD.

Sometime between 194 and 214, according to the Armenian historian Moses of Khorene (5th century), Hunni (probably the Kidarites) captured the city of Balkh (Armenian name: Kush) . According to Armenian sources, Balkh became the capital of the Hunni.

At the end of the 4th century AD, the Kidarites were pushed into Gandhara, after a new wave of invaders from the north, the Alchon, entered Bactria.

=== Clashes with the Sasanians ===
Early confrontations between the Sasanian Empire of Shapur II with the Xionites were described by Ammianus Marcellinus: he reports that in 356 CE, Shapur II was taking his winter quarters on his eastern borders, "repelling the hostilities of the bordering tribes" of the Xionites and the Euseni, a name often amended to Cuseni (meaning the Kushans).

Shapur II successfully waged war against the Xionites for ten years which concluded in a treaty alliance with the Chionites and the Gelani in 358 CE under which the Xionites would help Shapur II in his war against the Romans.

=== Alchon ===
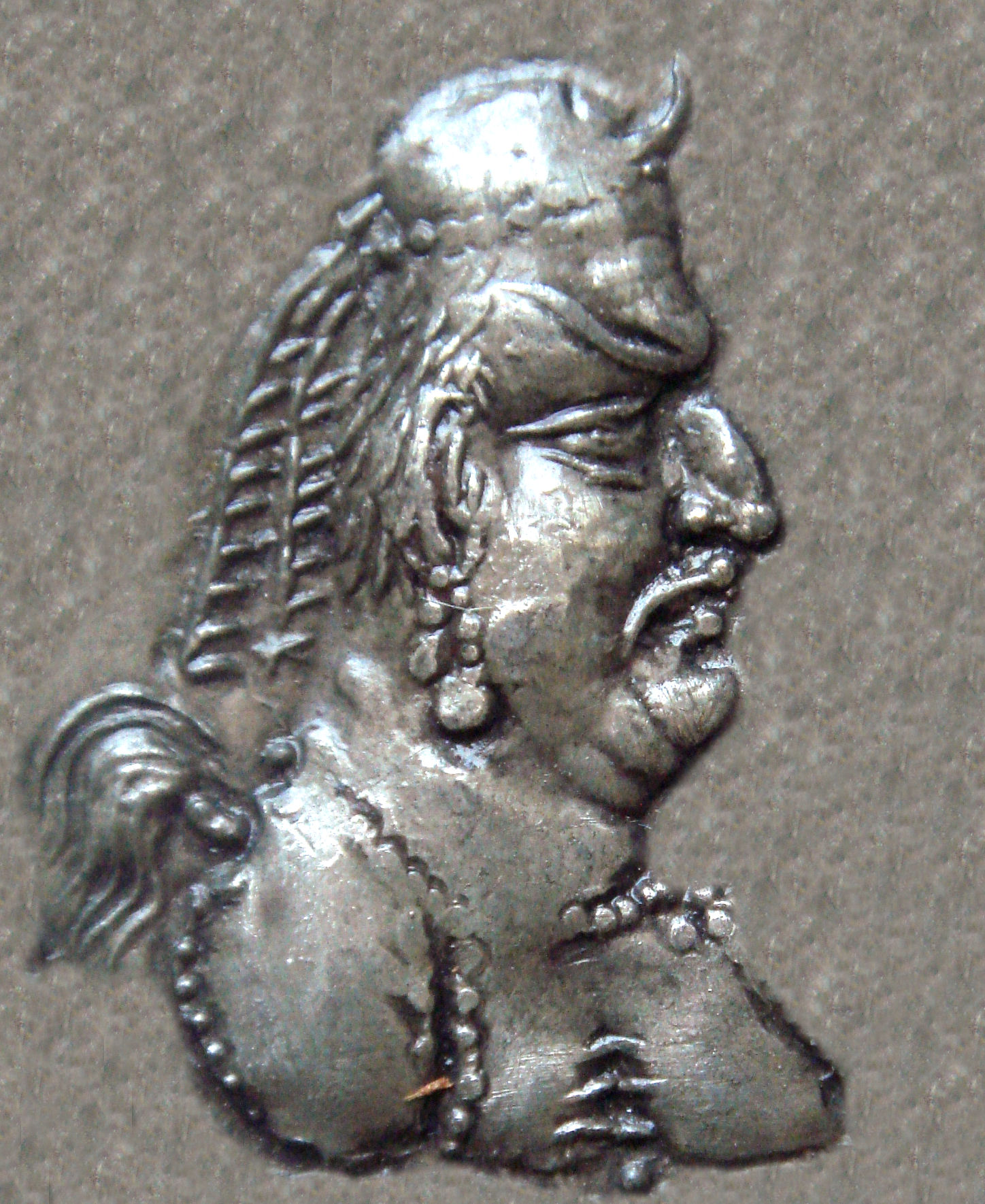
Artificial cranial deformation is suggested by a portrait of Khingila, king of the Alchon c. 430 – 490 AD.

In 460, Khingila I reportedly united a Hephthalite ruling élite with elements of the Uar and Xionites as Alchon (or Alχon). when.

At the end of the 5th century the Alchon invaded North India where they were known as the Huna. In India the Alchon were not distinguished from their immediate Hephthalite predecessors, and both are known as Sveta-Hunas there. Perhaps complimenting this term, Procopius (527–565) wrote that they were white skinned, had an organized kingship, and that their life was not wild/nomadic and they lived in cities.

The Alchon were noted for their distinctive coins, minted in Bactria in the 5th and 6th centuries. The name Khigi, inscribed in Bactrian script on one of the coins, and Narendra on another, have led some scholars to believe that the Hephthalite kings Khingila and Narana were of the AlChoNo tribe. They imitated the earlier style of their Hephthalite predecessors, the Kidarite Hun successors to the Kushans. In particular the Alchon style imitates the coins of Kidarite Varhran I (syn. Kushan Varhran IV).

The earliest coins of the Alchon have several distinctive features: 1) the king's head is presented in an elongated form to reflect the Alchon practice of head binding; 2) The characteristic bull/lunar tamgha of the Alchon is represented on the obverse of the coins.

=== Hephthalites ===
The Hephthalites, or White Huns, were a nomadic tribe who conquered large parts of the eastern middle-east and may have originally been part of the Xionites.

=== Nezak ===
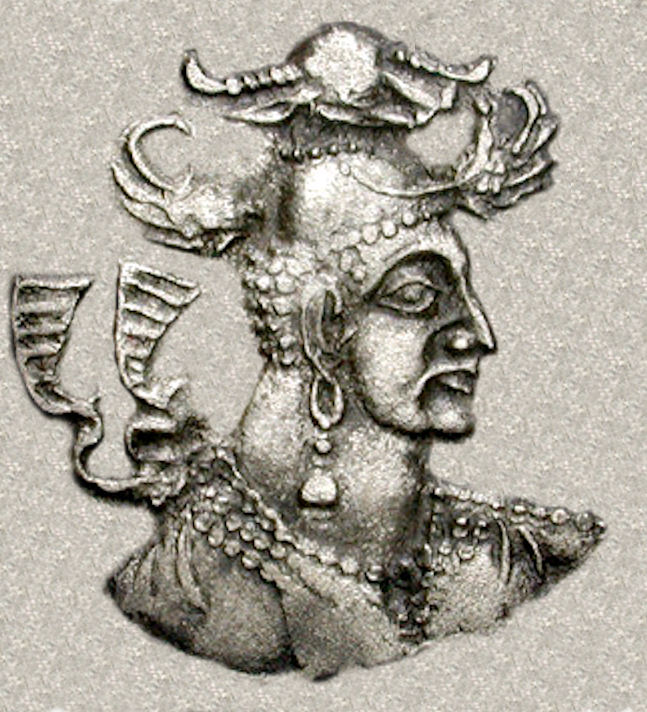
Portrait of a Nezak ruler, c. 460–560 CE.

Although the power of the Huna in Bactria was shattered in the 560s by a combination of Sassanid and Turkic forces, the last Hephthalite king Narana/Narendra managed to maintain some kind of rule between 570 and 600 AD over the nspk, napki or Nezak tribes that remained.

=== Identity of the Karmir Xyon and White Xyon ===
Bailey argues that the Pahlavi name Xyon may be read as the Indian Huna owing to the similarity of sound. In the Avestan tradition (Yts. 9.30-31, 19.87) the Xiiaona were characterized as enemies of Vishtaspa, the patron of Zoroaster.

In the later Pahlavi tradition, the Karmir Xyon ("Red Xyon") and Spet Xyon ("White Xyon") are mentioned. The Red Xyon of the Pahlavi tradition (7th century) have been identified by Bailey as the Kermichiones or Ermechiones.

According to Bailey, the Hara Huna of Indian sources are to be identified with the Karmir Xyon of the Avesta. Similarly he identifies the Sveta Huna of Indian sources with the Spet Xyon of the Avesta. While the Hephthalite are not mentioned in Indian sources, they are sometimes also linked to the Spet Xyon (and therefore possibly to the Sveta Huna).

More controversially, the names Karmir Xyon and Spet Xyon are often rendered as "Red Huns" and "White Huns", reflecting speculation that the Xyon were linked to Huns recorded simultaneously in Europe.

== See also ==
- Huna people
- Hephthalite Empire
- Uar
- Iranian Huns

== Sources ==
- Cribb, Joe (2010). Alram, M. (ed.). "The Kidarites, the numismatic evidence.pdf". Coins, Art and Chronology II: 91–146.
- Daryaee, Touraj; Rezakhani, Khodadad (2017). "The Sasanian Empire". In Daryaee, Touraj (ed.). King of the Seven Climes: A History of the Ancient Iranian World (3000 BCE – 651 CE). UCI Jordan Center for Persian Studies. pp. 1–236. ISBN 978-0-692-86440-1.
- Payne, Richard (2016). "The Making of Turan: The Fall and Transformation of the Iranian East in Late Antiquity". Journal of Late Antiquity. 9. Baltimore: Johns Hopkins University Press: 4–41. doi:10.1353/jla.2016.0011. S2CID 156673274.
- Rezakhani, Khodadad (2017). "East Iran in Late Antiquity". ReOrienting the Sasanians: East Iran in Late Antiquity. Edinburgh University Press. pp. 1–256. ISBN 978-1-4744-0030-5. JSTOR 10.3366/j.ctt1g04zr8.
