= Siege of Nisibis (338) =

- Part of the Mesopotamian campaigns of Shapur II
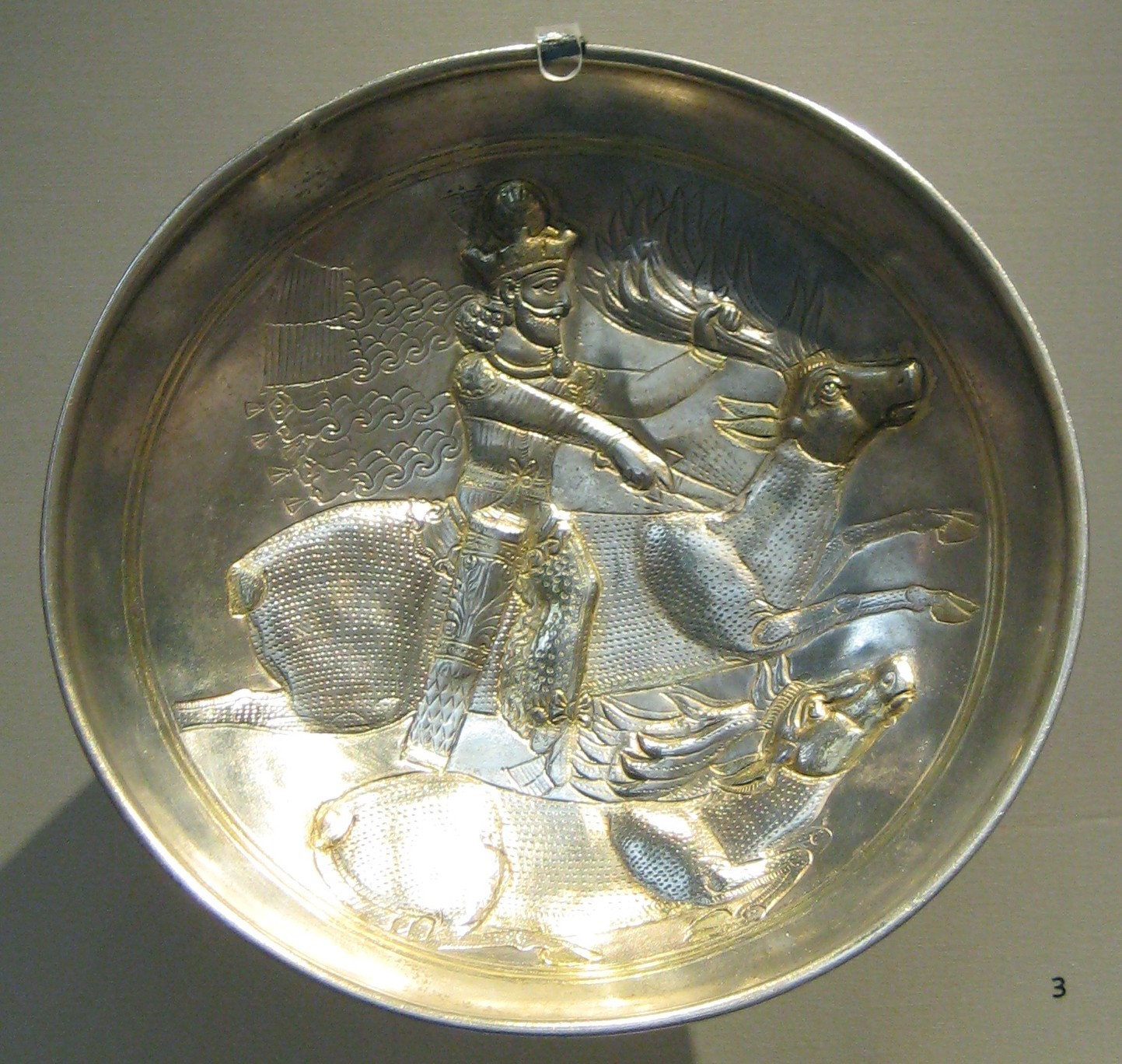
- Silver and gold plate depicting the Sassanid ruler Shapur II.
Date	June 15th – August 14th or 24th, (Note: Sources say Jacob of Nisibis died on July 15th, the thirtieth day of the siege, according to the Chronicle of 724. This means that the siege might have started in June 15th, and ended in August 14th (if the siege lasted 60 days) or August 24th (if it lasted for 70 days).) 338 AD, siege lasted 60–70 days
Location	Nisibis (modern Nusaybin)
Result	Roman victory

Belligerents
Roman Empire	Sasanian Empire

Commanders and leaders
Lucillianus; Jacob (PKIA) (Note: Most of the sources say that Jacob of Nisibis took part in the 338 siege by Shapur II. Some sources say he died in this siege, where the Martyrologium Hieronymianum relates that he died on 15 July, the thirtieth day of the siege, according to the Chronicle of 724. Other sources say that he also participated in a later siege of Nisibis by Shapur in 350, according to the Chronicon Paschale, and he died there, killed in action.)	Shapur II

The siege of Nisibis of 338 constituted the initial phase of Perso-Roman wars of 337–361. Shapur besieged Nisibis, which was then regarded as the key to Mesopotamia and, after sixty days, no closer to taking Nisibis and with a plague hampering his army, he lifted the siege and returned to Persia.

== Historical context ==
=== Prelude ===
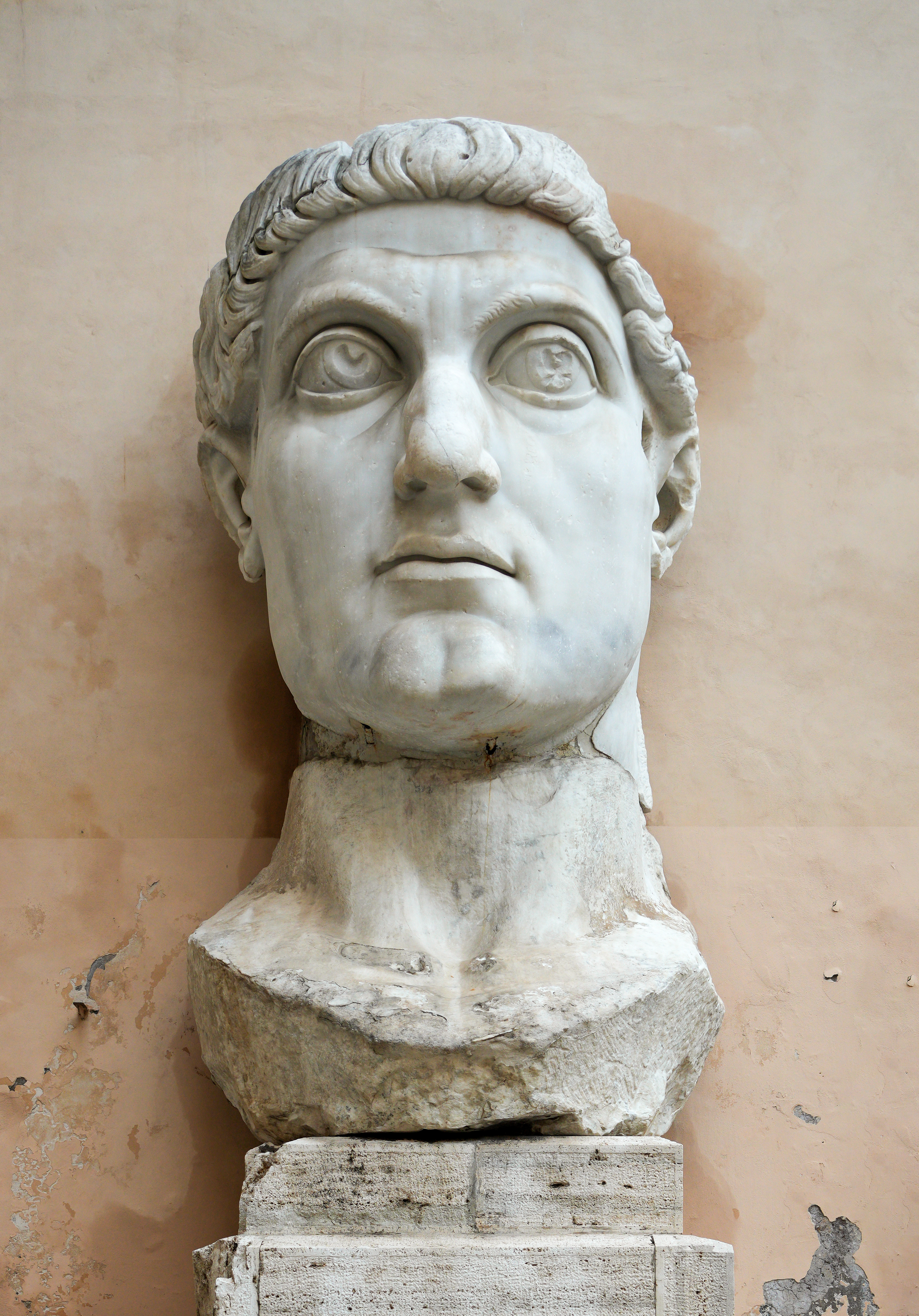
Head of the Colossus of Constantine the Great, Capitoline Museums.

Constantine I died on 22 May 337, not far from Nicomedia, while preparing a military campaign against the Sassanids. He did not appoint a single successor, but divided power between his three sons, the Caesars Constans I, Constantine II and Constantius II, and his two nephews Dalmatius and Hannibalianus. And so shortly before the death of Constantine I, the two armies, on one side the Roman one commanded by Constantine's son, Constantius II (with " headquarters " in Antioch in Syria), and by his nephew Hannibalianus (sent to Caesarea Cappadocia and appointed "king of the Armenians and the tribes of Pontus"), on the other the Persian one, led by Shapur II himself, broke the truce and began to clash again. Constantius, who was busy in northern Mesopotamia supervising the construction of the border fortifications, hastened back to Constantinople, where he organised and attended his father's funeral ceremonies: with this gesture he strengthened his rights as successor and gained the support of the army, a fundamental component of Constantine's policy.

Thus began a period of the so called "war of position" which lasted on and off for almost thirty years, in which Shapur tried to conquer the border fortresses of Roman Mesopotamia: Singara, Nisibis and Amida. And although Shapur had succeeded in some circumstances in defeating the Roman army of Constantius II, he failed to ensure permanent occupation of these fortresses, which were often reoccupied by the Romans.

=== Casus belli ===
By early 337 (probably shortly after Constantine's death), the Armenians revolted against the Sassanid rule, driving them out of their territories and even carrying out raids against them, beyond the borders of their kingdom. In a moment of such great crisis, Constantius II was however unable to give them his military aid, since he was in Pannonia to divide the Empire with his brothers Constantine II and Constans I, now that Hannibalianus (the fourth Caesar) had fallen victim to a conspiracy. In fact the limes orientalis (eastern frontier, border) was without a commander in chief. This allowed Shapur II to take advantage of this situation of political uncertainty in the Roman Empire, attacking its eastern provinces. The Sassanid ruler began his campaign by besieging the city of Nisibis, and then proceeded to devastate the whole of Roman Mesopotamia. It is said that the royal army was immense, composed of infantry and cavalry units.

== Siege ==
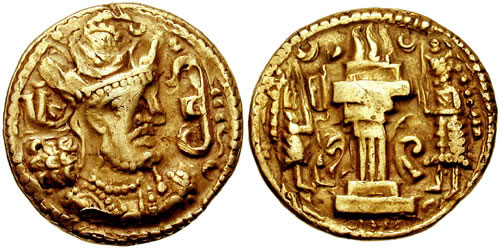
Face and emblem of Shapur II depicted on a coin.

Having reached the city, Shapur divided his army so as to surround it completely, placing siege engines everywhere (including a helepolis), e placing a series of branches transversally in front of the latter, ordering the construction of ramps and towers that would lean against the city walls. Then as he ordered the archers to attack, after they had climbed up the high siege towers, he instructed other troops to dig tunnels under the city walls, to make them collapse or to overcome them and attack the enemy from within, behind him.

However, none of these measures had the desired effect on the part of the Persians, thanks to the skillful defense of Jacob of Nisibis. Sapore then decided to adopt a new, very ingenious technique: he blocked the course of the nearby river by building a dam, so as to accumulate a large quantity of water, which he would then suddenly throw against the city walls with great violence, as if it were an enormous battering ram.

The walls could not resist the force of the water, and shaken by the waves, they collapsed, at least along that part of the city hit by the wave. But the inhabitants of Nisibeno were not discouraged and the following night they rebuilt new ones with everything they had available (stones and bricks), forcing the Sassanids to postpone their assault. The height of the new walls was such that it could repel an assault by the fearsome cataphract cavalry or by infantry equipped with assault ladders. Theodoret of Cyrrhus adds that the Christian prayers of the Nisibenians caused the arrival of a great quantity of midges and mosquitoes which attacked the Sassanid armies, on their mounts and on the elephant departments, so much so as to cause general confusion. The Sassanid king, taken by despair, seeing that:

- None of his siege engines had been able to make a decisive assault on the city walls;
- The attempt to break through the walls with the force of the water from the nearby river had been in vain;
- The entire Sassanid army was now exhausted;
- The man in command on the walls appeared to be the Roman emperor himself, as he was wearing a purple tunic and a diadem;

He referred to withdraw and return to his imperial palace, condemning to death all those who had assured him that the Emperor himself would not be there to defend Nisibis.

Jacob of Nisibis probably died in this siege, killed in action, right before Shapur's retreat.

== Sources ==
=== Secondary or modern ===
- Dodgeon, Michael H.; Lieu, Samuel N. C., eds. (2002). The Roman Eastern Frontier and the Persian Wars (AD 226-363). Routledge.
- Bundy, David (2013). "Jacob of Nisibis". Encyclopedia of Early Christianity, ed. Everett Ferguson. Routledge.
- Lightfoot, C. S. (1988). "Facts and Fiction: The Third Siege of Nisibis (A.D. 350)". Historia: Zeitschrift für Alte Geschichte, Bd. 37, H. 1. Franz Steiner Verlag. pp. 105–125.
- Whitby, Michael (1998). "Deus Nobiscum: Christianity, Warfare and Morale in Late Antiquity". Bulletin of the Institute of Classical Studies. Supplement, No. 71. Wiley. pp. 191–208.
- Frend, W. H. C. (1972). "The Monks and the Survival of the East Roman Empire in the Fifth Century". Past & Present, No. 54. Oxford University Press. pp. 3–24.
- Burgess, R. W. (1988). "The Dates of the First Siege of Nisibis and the Death of James of Nisibis". Byzantion, Vol. 69, No. 1. Peeters Publishers. pp. 7–17.
- Horst, Eberhard (September 1, 1987). Rusconi Libri (ed.). Costantino il Grande (in Italian).
- Bury, John Bagnell (1925). The Cambridge Ancient History - Volume XIII The Late Empire 337-425. Cambridge University Press. pp. 11–32. ISBN 0-521-30200-5.
