= Shapur II's Arab campaign =

325 Sasanian military campaign

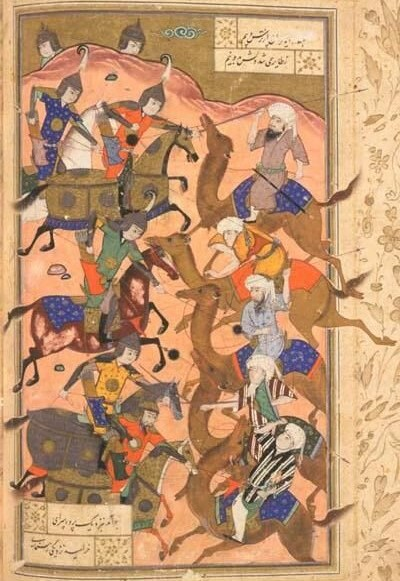
- "The battle between Shapur II with the Arabs led by Ta'ir", from a copy of the Shahnameh, dated 1500
Date	325
Location	Mesopotamia, Persian Gulf littoral, Arabian Peninsula, and Syrian Desert
Result	Sasanian victory

Belligerents
Sasanian Empire	Arab tribes, primarily: Iyad; Taghlib; Banu Bakr; Banu Abdul Qays; Banu Tamim; Banu Hanzala

Commanders and leaders
Shapur II	

Units involved
Sasanian army: Cavalry; Pushtigban Sasanian navy	

Strength
Unknown	Unknown

Casualties and losses
Unknown	

Shapur II's Arab campaign took place in 325, against numerous Arab tribes, due to the Arab incursions into the Sasanian Empire. Shahanshah Shapur II defeated all the Arab tribes his forces encountered during the campaign.

== Arab incursions ==
During the childhood of Shapur II, Arab nomads made several incursions into the Sasanian homeland of Pars, where they raided Gor and its surroundings. Furthermore, they also made incursions into Meshan and Mazun.

== Campaign ==
At the age of 16, Shapur led an expedition against the Arabs. According to al-Tabari, he hand-picked 1,000 cavalrymen for the campaign, a possible reference to the pushtigban unit. He primarily campaigned against the Iyad tribe in Asoristan and thereafter he crossed the Persian Gulf, reaching al-Khatt, a region between present-day Bahrain and Qatar. He then attacked the Banu Tamim in the Hajar Mountains.

After having dealt with the Arabs of Eastern Arabia, he continued his expedition into Western Arabia and the Syrian desert. Furthermore, he also deported some Arab tribes by force; the Taghlib to Bahrain and al-Khatt; the Banu Abdul Qays and Banu Tamim to Hajar; the Banu Bakr to Kirman, and the Banu Hanzalah to a place near Hormizd-Ardashir.

The Zoroastrian scripture Bundahishn also mentions the campaign:

During the rulership of Shapur (II), the son of Hormizd, the Arabs came; they took Khorig Rūdbār; for many years with contempt (they) rushed until Shapur came to rulership.

Colonies of Persian officials and soldiers were settled in new garrisons along the Arabian coastlands of the Persian Gulf, especially in Oman's strategic coast in Al Batinah Region, including the tip of the Musandam Peninsula, Sohar, and Rustaq.

In order to prevent the Arabs from making more raids into his country, Shapur II ordered the construction of a defensive line near al-Hira, which became known as Wall of the Arabs (Middle Persian: war ī tāzīgān, in Arabic: خندق سابور khandaq Sābūr, "Ditch of Shapur").

Some of the accounts regarding Shapur's campaign against the Arab lands record the mistreatment of the Arabs, the burning of cities, and the flooding of water sources. These embellishments stem from Persian sources that have been greatly overstated. However, the Roman historians about the event do not support this claim.

Ferdowsi presents a different account of the campaign, placing it during the reign of Shapur II. As for the claim that Hormizd II defeated the Arabs, it is highly questionable, as eastern sources mention that Shapur II was a staunch enemy of the Arabs. However, the story of his campaign reaching Al-Yamama and near Medina, and his being called "Dhū al-Aktāf" as "he who pierces shoulders", due to his mistreatment of captives, is considered a fabrication. The Arab kings of Al-Hira, specifically the Lakhmids, were allies of the Sasanians, and their hostility toward the Ghassanids, who served the Romans, was a significant factor, as seen in the wars of Khosrow I with the Byzantines. These Lakhmid kings also had their own political role.

Sources mention that Shapur was given the title "Dhū al-Aktāf" because he supposedly dislocated the shoulders of the Arabs. However, Theodor Nöldeke believed that this explanation was a fabrication. According to him, the title originally had a different meaning in Sasanian culture, unrelated to shoulder dislocation. Instead it meant "the one with shoulders", symbolizing strength and power. He argued that later historians reinterpreted the title to fit the narrative of Shapur's harsh treatment of the Arabs.

== Sources ==
- Bosworth, C. E. (2014). "ABNĀ". Encyclopaedia Iranica.
- Daryaee, Touraj (2017). "ŠĀPUR II". Encyclopaedia Iranica.
- Frye, R. N. (1983). "The political history of Iran under the Sasanians". In Yarshater, Ehsan (ed.). The Cambridge History of Iran: The Seleucid, Parthian and Sasanian Periods. Vol. 3(1). Cambridge: Cambridge University Press. ISBN 0-521-20092-X.
- Munt, Harry (2015). "Arabic and Persian Sources for Pre-Islamic Arabia". In Fisher, Greg (ed.). Arabs and Empires before Islam. Oxford University Press. pp. 434–500. ISBN 978-0-19-965452-9.457
- Pourshariati, Parvaneh (2008). Decline and Fall of the Sasanian Empire: The Sasanian-Parthian Confederacy and the Arab Conquest of Iran. London and New York: I.B. Tauris. ISBN 978-1-84511-645-3.
- Shapur Shahbazi, A. (2005). "SASANIAN DYNASTY". Encyclopaedia Iranica, Online Edition.
