= Indianisation =

Spread of Indian religions, culture, diaspora, soft power, economic reach and impact

Indianisation (also spelt as Indianization) may refer to the spread of Indian languages, culture, diaspora, cuisines, economic reach and impact beyond the Indian subcontinent.

== History ==
=== Ancient era ===
Presence and spread of Sanskrit

Indianisation took place in Southeast Asia mainly from the first millennium onwards through trade and religion.

==== Indo-Greek Kingdom ====
The blending of Indian and Greek cultures eventually produced the unique Greco-Buddhist art of Gandhara, the region spanning parts of present-day Afghanistan and the northwestern frontier.

The Indo-Greeks and the Shungas seem to have reconciled and exchanged diplomatic missions around 113 BCE, as indicated by the Heliodorus pillar, which records the dispatch of a Greek ambassador named Heliodorus, from the court of the Indo-Greek king Antialcidas, to the court of the Shunga emperor Bhagabhadra at the site of Vidisha in central India. A pillar known as the Heliodorus column stands at Besnagar, near Sanchi in Central India. Dating back to the first century BC, it features a Sanskrit inscription that offers valuable insight into the Indianization of the Greeks who had settled on the Indian frontier. The pillar illustrates how these Greeks absorbed Indian culture. The inscription has been translated as follows:

This Garuda column of Vasudeva (Vishnu), the God of gods, was erected by Heliodorus, a worshipper of Vishnu, the son of Dion, and an inhabitant of Taxila, who came as Greek ambassador from the great King Antialcidas to King Kashiputra Bhagabhadra, the saviour, then reigning in the fourteenth year of his kingship.
Three immortal precepts, when practised well, lead to heaven—self-restraint, self-sacrifice (charity), conscientiousness.

==== Kushan Empire ====
During the reigns of Kanishka I and Huvishka, the dynastic self-representation of the Kushan emperors was formed from ethnic and cultural elements characteristic of Bactria. This may have been intended to reinforce the conception of Bactria or more precisely, Tokharistan as the imperial homeland of the Kushans, the site at which Kanishka’s successful conquest of India was commemorated. Such a reorientation is especially noteworthy in view of the pronounced emphasis on Indian cultural motifs that characterized the coinage of Vima Kadphises. In the later period, the western territories of the Kushan Empire, including Bactria itself, fell under Sasanian control, confining Kushan rule to Indian lands alone. This territorial contraction appears to have encouraged a further evolution of their dynastic self-representation toward a more distinctly Indian identity. (Note: "On a seal of Kaniška II or III, the king has lost his designation ‘Kušān’ but now has the new title υνδογανο þαο ‘king of the Indians’ (Sims-Williams – Tucker 2006, 588). The Kamra inscription of Vasiška does mention the designation, whereas the Ārā Inscription of his son Kaniška III does not (on both inscriptions cf. Falk 2009, 27–28); at the same time the title Kušānšāh was used by the Sāsānian subsidiary dynasty in Bactria, and the territory was also named the Kušānšahr in Sāsānian inscriptions, (so noted by Cribb 2018, 17).")

=== Colonial era ===
The term Indianisation was used in British India to describe the inclusion of native people in running India. For example, the Indian Armed Force began to Indianise in 1917. In the early 20th century, discourse around Indianisation also revolved around the emerging scholarship on an ancient Greater India and the possibility to re-assert India's value and independence. Initially, the theory considered it likely that Indians had colonised Southeast Asia in developing it, though later it became clear that influence occurred mainly through trade and peaceful contact.

== Indian cultural influence ==
Silk Road transmission of Buddhism

Historical spread of Indian culture beyond India proper:

- Indomania or Indophilia refers to the special interest that Indian culture has generated in the world, more specifically the western world where though the 19th century European writers had seen India as a cradle of civilization, their romantic vision of India was gradually replaced by "Indophobia". Indology has evolved as the academic study of Indian history and culture, which is sometimes replaced by the term "South Asian studies".
- Greater India
  - Indosphere
  - Sanskritisation
    - List of Sanskrit-related topics
  - Buddhist studies
  - Hindu studies
  - Neo-Vedanta
- Indianisation of Southeast Asia
  - Indianised kingdom
  - History of Indian influence on Southeast Asia
    - Sanskrit inscriptions in the Malay world
    - South-East Asia campaign of Rajendra Chola
    - Chola invasion of Srivijaya
    - Indian influences in early Philippine polities
  - East Indies or Indies in Southeast Asia under Indian cultural influence, e.g. Indonesia and Philippines
  - Indochina, Indianised Southeast Asia under French colonial rule

== Indian inventions ==
- List of Indian inventions and discoveries
- Indian numeral system, disseminated from India to Arabia and then to Europe.

== Indian soft power ==
Historic Indosphere cultural influence zone of Greater India for transmission of elements of Indian arts, architecture, culture, religion, martial arts, etc.

Global spread of Indian soft power:

- Medical tourism in India
  - Ayurveda
  - Siddha medicine
  - Yoga
- Global influence of India's:
  - Architecture
  - Cuisine
    - Influence on Southeast Asian cuisine
  - Martial arts, especially on Southeast Asian martial arts
  - Movies and Bollywood
  - Music
  - Physical culture
- India at the Big Four international beauty pageants
- Indianisation of British Colonial India's bureaucracy

=== Names ===
- Global influence of India in names of people
- Global influence of India in names of places
- Influence of Indian honorifics in Southeast Asia
  - Filipino
  - Indonesian
  - Malay
  - Thai
- Renaming of cities in India, for decolonisation and re-indianisation of city names

== Indian diaspora ==
Global Indian diaspora is world's largest diaspora, which includes NRIs, OCI, PIO, and mixed races:

- Indian diaspora (PIO and NRI), world's largest diaspora
  - Overseas Citizenship of India
  - List of heads of state and government of Indian origin, Indian diaspora's influence on policy making of other nations
  - List of foreign politicians of Indian origin, Indian diaspora's influence on policy making of other nations
- British colonial era diaspora
  - Coolies, Girmityas, and Indian indentured labourers, such as Indian South Africans, Malaysian Indians, Indo-Caribbeans, Indo-Fijians, Mauritians of Indian origin, Indian diaspora in Southeast Africa, Indian Singaporeans
  - Anglo-Indians, such as Eurasians in Singapore, Irish Indians, Luso-Indian, Macanese people, Scottish-Indian
  - Commonwealth diaspora – Diaspora of the British Commonwealth
- Other mixed diaspora
  - Chinese Indians
  - Dougla
  - Seychellois Creole people
  - South Asian diaspora
- Indian-origin religions diaspora:
  - Buddhist diaspora: Tibetan diaspora
  - Hindu diaspora: Bengali Hindu diaspora
  - Jain diaspora
  - Sikh diaspora
- Foreign-origin religions diaspora of overseas Indians
  - Jews: Bnei Menashe Mizo-Manipuri diaspora
- Global influence of Indian diaspora organisations and lobby groups
  - Global Organization for People of Indian Origin
  - Indian origin politicians in other nations

== See also ==
- Acculturation – Adjusting to a new cultural environment
- Arabization – Process of growing Arab influence on non-Arab populations
- Christianization – Conversion of society or culture to Christianity
- Islamization – History of Islam
- Persianization – Cultural assimilation of Persian traits
- Westernization – Global adoption of western culture and values
  - Americanization – Global influence of US culture
  - Anglicization – Form of cultural assimilation
