= Vasudeva (disambiguation) =

Vasudeva, or Vasudeva Anakadundubhi, is a character from the Mahabharata and father of the Hindu deity Krishna or (Vāsudeva-Krishna).

Vasudeva may also refer to:

- Vāsudeva-Krishna or Krishna Vasudeva (or simply Vāsudeva and Krishna), a major Hindu god, son of Vasudeva
- Vasudeva, a class of 9 illustrious beings in Jainism
- Any of the following Kushana kings
  - Vasudeva I, c.191 to c.232
  - Vasudeva II, c. 275 to 300
  - Vasudeva III
  - Vasudeva IV
- Vasudeva Kanva, 1st-century BCE founder of the Kanva dynasty of Magadha in ancient India
- Vasudeva (Chahamana dynasty), a ruler of the Chahamanas of Shakambhari in medieval northern India
- Vasudeva (book), a book about Vasudeva by Indian writer Narendra Kohli
- Vasudeva-hindi, 5th-century Jain text in Maharashtri Prakrit about Vasudeva

== See also ==
- Vasudev (disambiguation)
- Basudev (disambiguation)
- Vasudevan, an Indian name
