= Vāsishka =

Kushan emperor from c.247 to c.265

- Kushan emperor
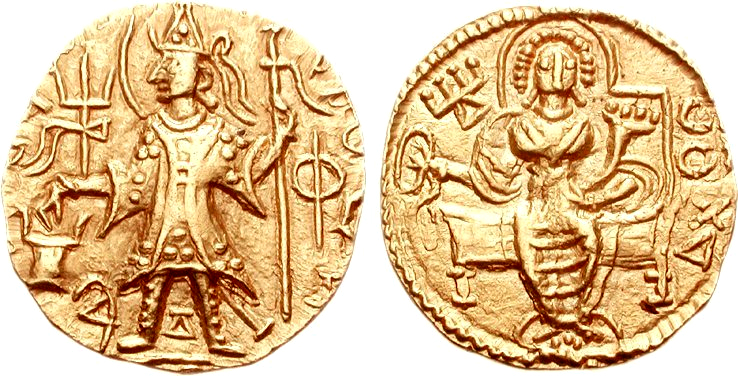
- Coinage of Vashishka. c. 240–250 CE. Obverse: [ÞAONANOÞAO BAZH]ÞKO K[O]ÞA[NO] (Shaonanoshao Bazishko Koshano) in Greco-Bactrian script, Vasishka, nimbate, diademed, and crowned, standing facing, head left, sacrificing over an altar to left, and holding trident in left hand; filleted trident to left; "Vira" in Brahmi script to inner left at feet; "Va" in Brahmi between legs; "Chu" in Brahmi script in inner right field. Reverse: ΔXOO in Greco-Bactrian script, nimbate and diademed Ardoxsho seated facing on throne, feet holding filleted investiture garland in right hand and cradling a cornucopia in left arm; above, tamgha to left.
- Reign: 247–265 CE (18 years)
- Coronation: 247 CE
- Predecessor: Kanishka II
- Successor: Kanishka III
- Born: 187 CE
- Died: 265 CE
- Burial: 265 CE
- Spouse: Eliza
- Issue: Vasudeva II Kanishka III
Names
- Vashishka
- House: Unknown
- Dynasty: Kushan
- Father: Huvishka

Location of the epigraphic inscriptions of Vasishka.

Vāsishka (Bactrian: BAZHÞKO Bazēško; Middle Brahmi: 𑀯𑀸𑀲𑀺𑀱𑁆𑀓; Vā-si-ṣka, Vāsiṣka; Kharosthi: 𐨬𐨗𐨿𐨱𐨅𐨮𐨿𐨐 Va-jhe-ṣka, Vajheṣka; ruled c. 247–265 CE) was a Kushan emperor, who seems to have had a short reign following Kanishka II.

== Rule ==
The rule of Vāsishka in the area of Punjab is attested by inscriptions, as well as in the area of Mathura (Isapur inscription). His rule is recorded as far south as Sanchi, where one and possibly another inscription in his name have been found, dated to the year 22 (The Sanchi inscription of "Vaskushana"-i.e. Vasishka Kushana) and year 28 (The Sanchi inscription of Vasaska-i.e. Vasishka) of a Kushan era (widely thought to be the second century of the Kanishka era). This would place his reign c. 247–265.

== Inscriptions and statuary ==
Vasishka appears in four known inscriptions, including a Kharoshti inscription in the Indus region.

=== Sanchi Bodhisattava ===
Several statues or statue fragments from the art of Mathura with the name of Vasishka have been found on the site of Sanchi. One of them is a statue of a seated Bodhisattva, dated to "Year 28 of Vasishka". The inscription reads:

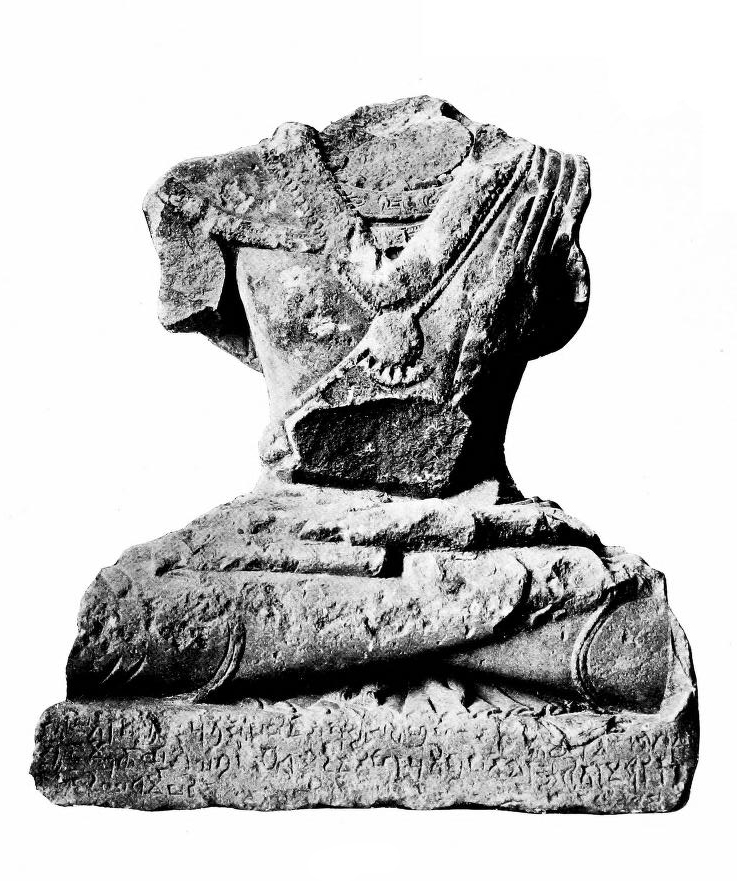
Sanchi Bodhisattva with inscription of Year 28 of Kushan King Vasishka.

L.1 ........ sya [rā] j[ā] t[i] r [ā] jasya Dēvaputrasya sh[ā]hi V[ā]s[ī]shkasya sa[ṁ] 20 8 he I di 5 as ya purv [āyāṁ] Bhaga[va]
L.2 sya jambuchhāyā-śailagṛi [ha]sya Dharmadēva vihārē pratishṭāpita Virasya dhitare Madhuriaka
L.3 [Anē]na deyadharma-pari [tyāgena]

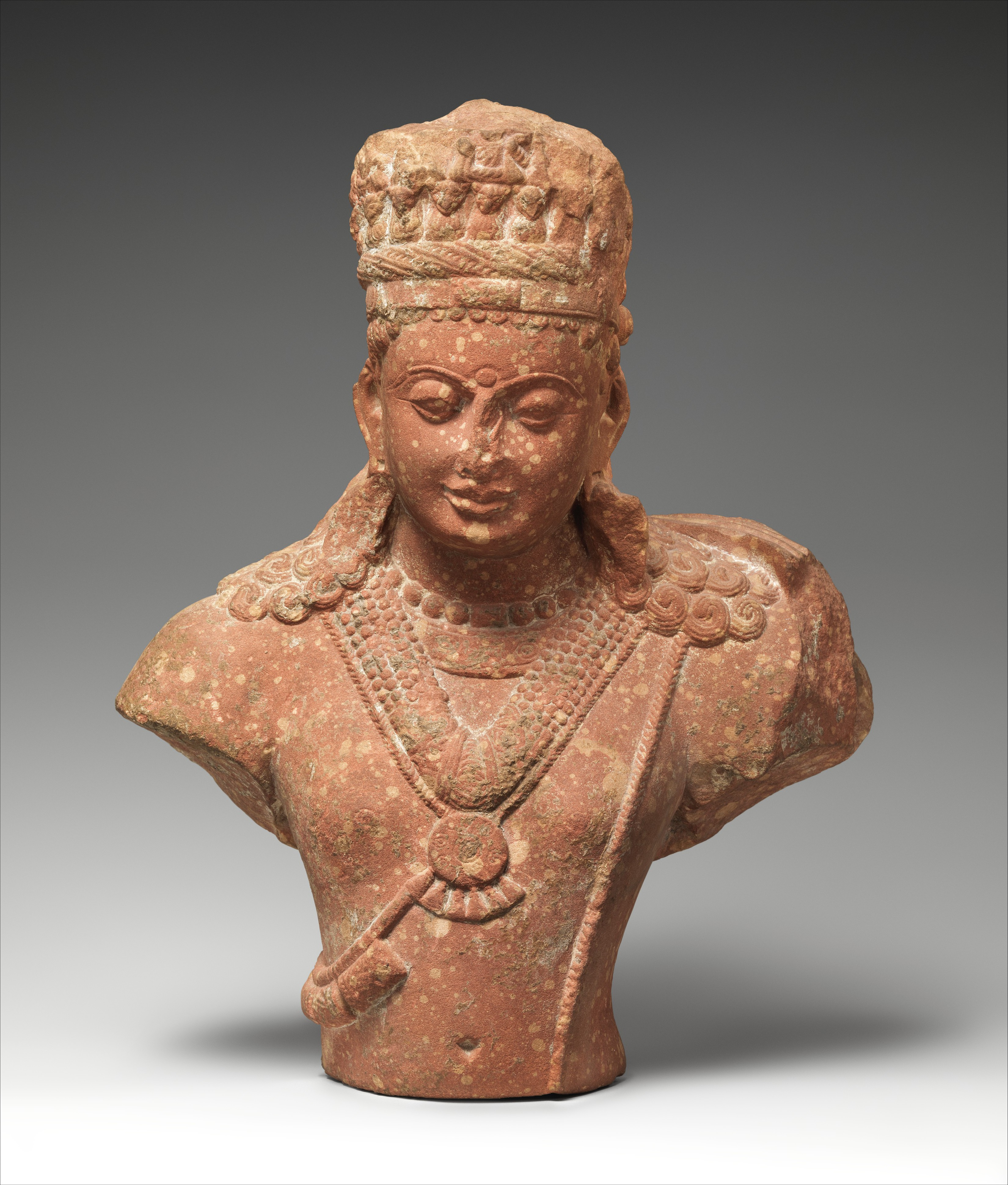
A better preserved statue with similar jewellery.

"Success : In the year 28 of Mahārāja Rājatirāja Devaputra Shāhi Vāsishka, in the first month of winter, on the fifth day, on this date, Madhurika, daughter of Vīra, installed (an image) of Bhagavat (Bodhisattva) sitting on the hill under the shade of the Jambu (rose-apple) tree in the Dharmadāvavihāra.
By this gift.... "

=== Sanchi pedestal ===
Another Mathura fragment found in Sanchi is the pedestal of a statue of a standing Buddha. The inscription is inscribed with "Year 22 of Vaskushana", thought to be possibly "Vasishka Kushana". Worshippers in long tunics with belts typical of the Kushan style can be seen standing around a seated Boddhisattva. The inscription reads:

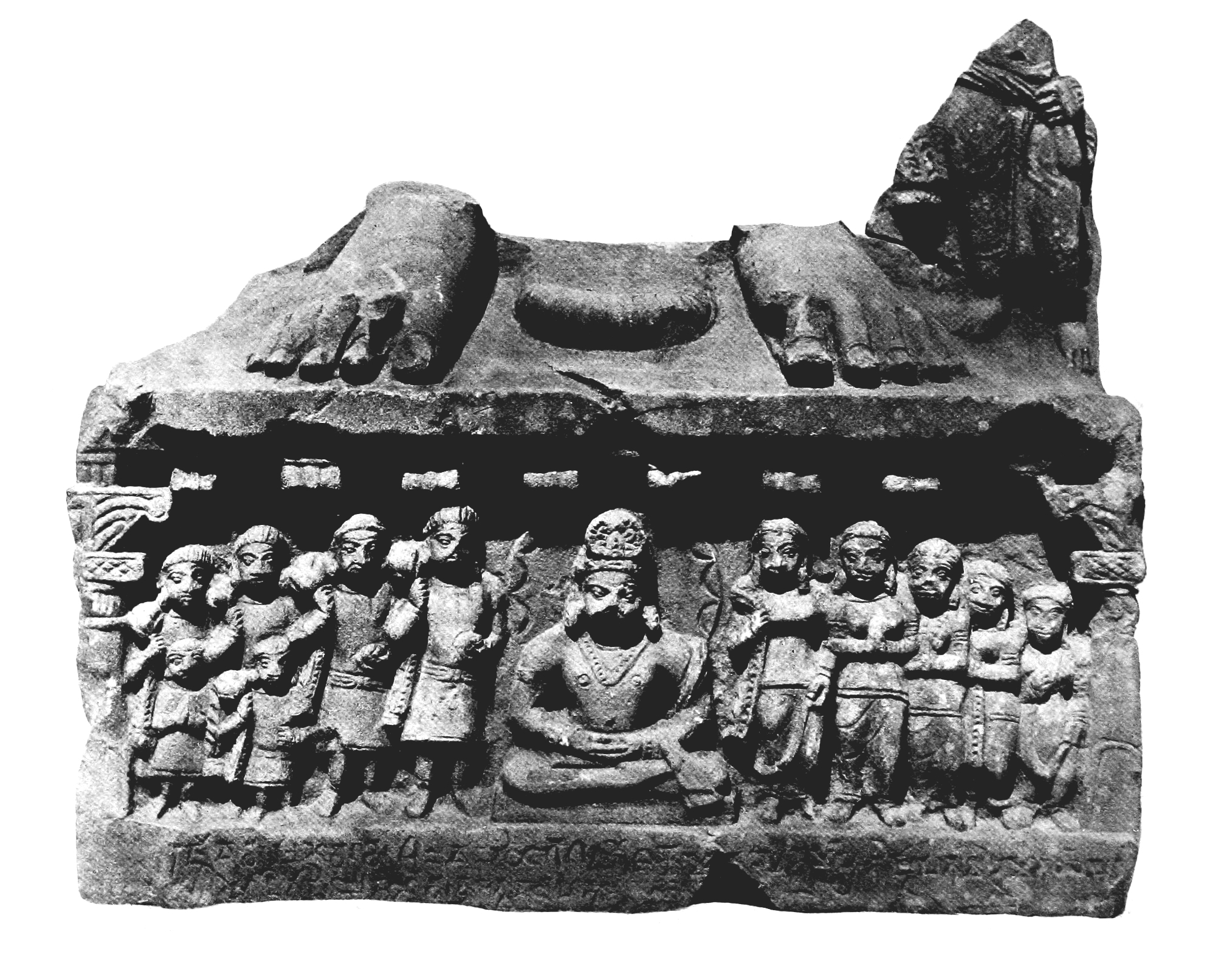
Sanchi Buddha pedestal inscribed Year 22 of Vaskushana.

L.1 ..... rājño Vaskushāṇasya sa 20 2 va 2 di 10 Bhagavato Sakkyam[un]eḥ pratimā pratishṭāpita Vidyamatiye pu
L.2 ......mātā-pitṛiṇa sarvva-satvanā ca hita-su

"In the (reign) of King Vaskushāṇa, the year 22, the 2nd month of the rainy season, on the 10th day, (this) image of the Bhagavat Sakyamuni was installed by Vidyamati for ...... and for the welfare and happiness of (her) parents and all creatures."

=== Ara inscription ===
Vāsishka appears in the "Ara inscription" of Kanishka III, found in the Indus region, not far south of Attock. In this inscription, he is presented as the father of Kanishka, thought to be Kanishka III, and his name appears in Kharoshthi as "Vajeshka".

Isapur inscription of Vasishka, Year 24
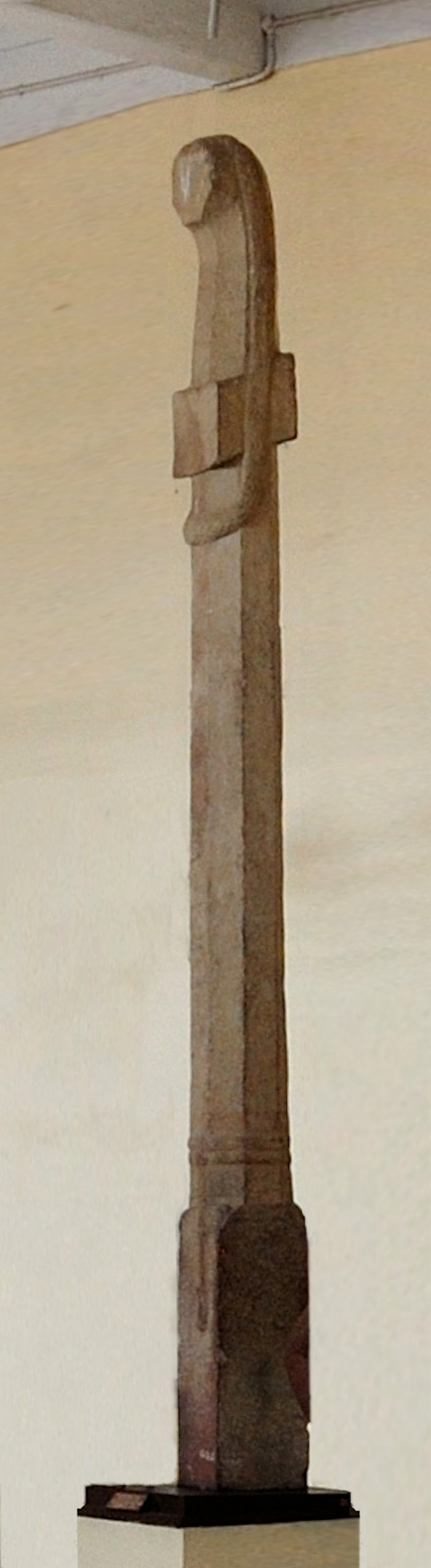
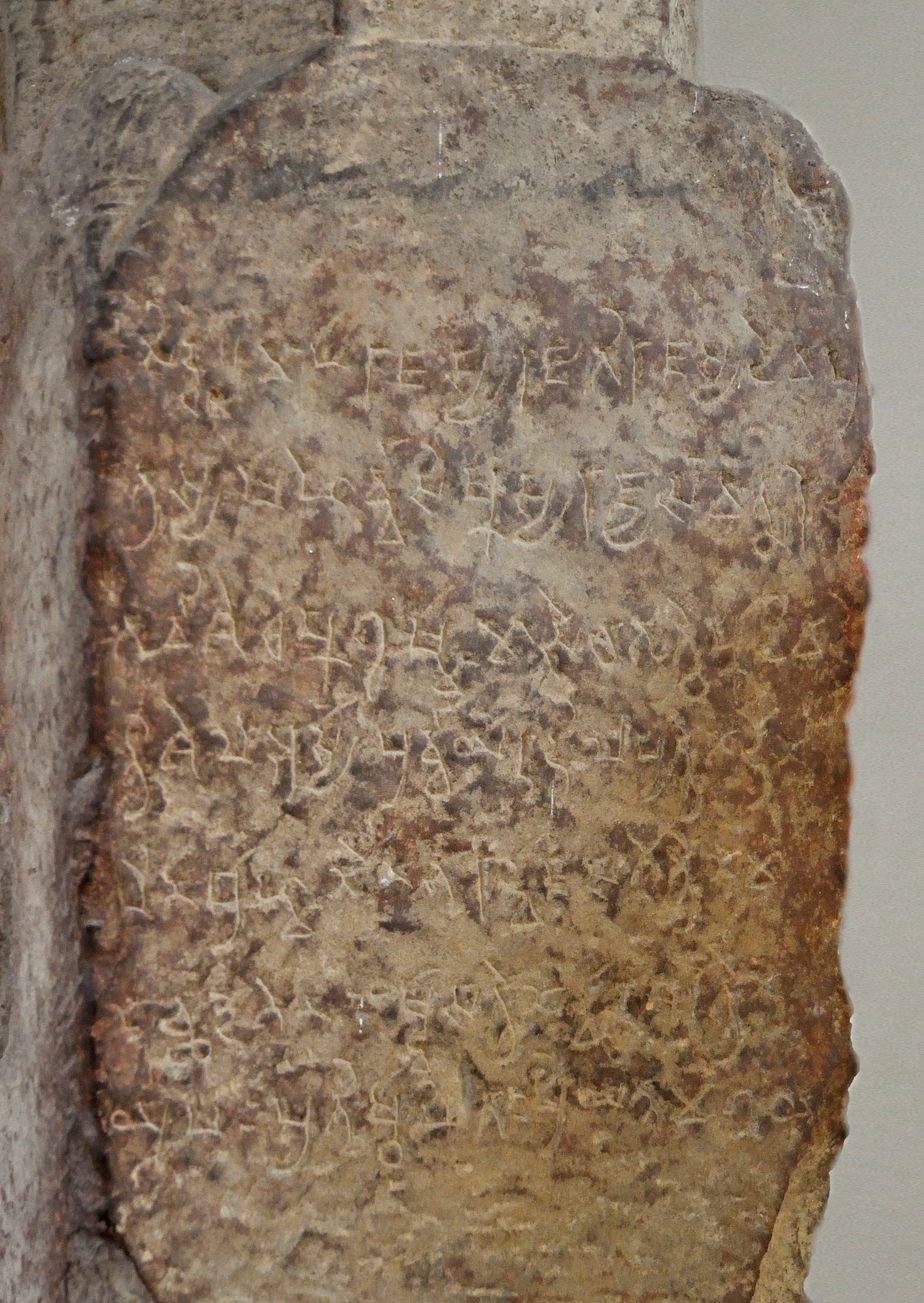
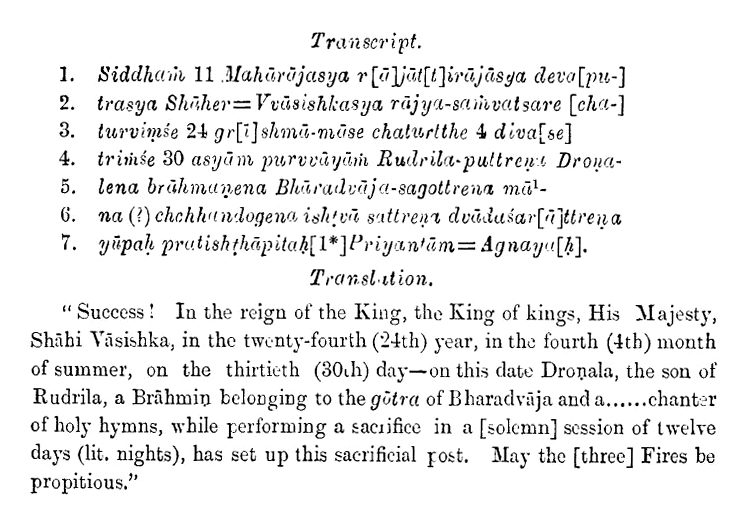
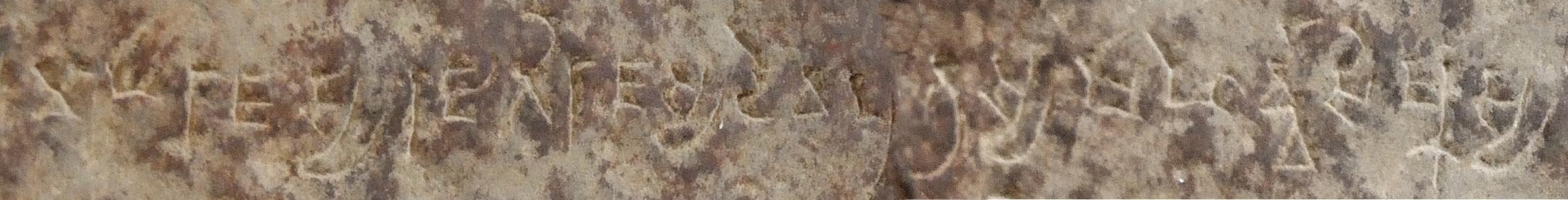
Inscription of Vasishka of the Year 24, on a Yupa Brahmanical sacrifical pillar from Isapur, near Mathura. Mathura Museum. The regnal title (bottom) reads clearly in Middle Brahmi script:

Mahārājasya rājātirājāsya devaputrasya Shāhe Vvāsishkasya
"Of the Great King, the King of kings, His Majesty, Shahi Vasishka"
Ara inscription of the Year 41
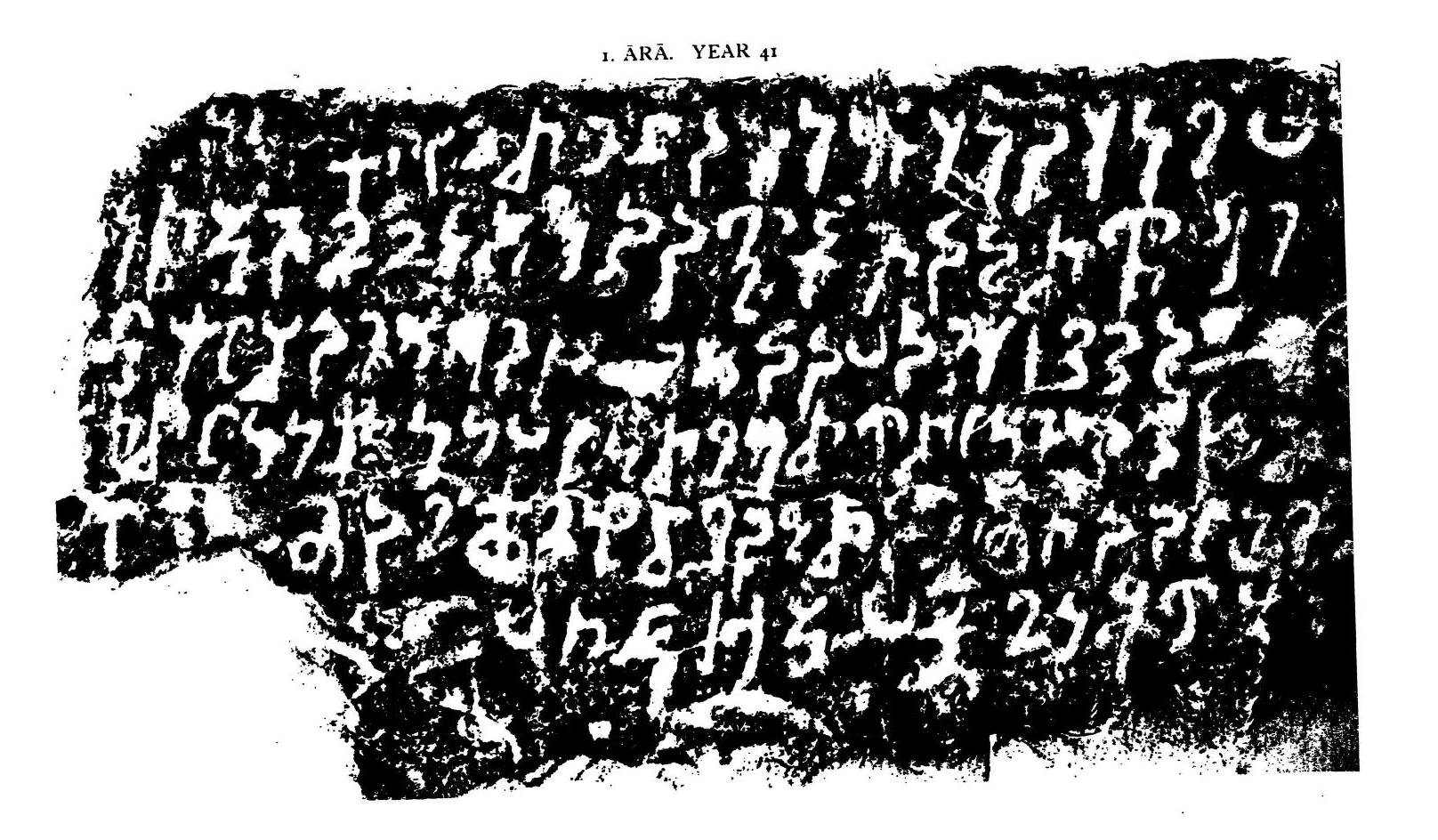
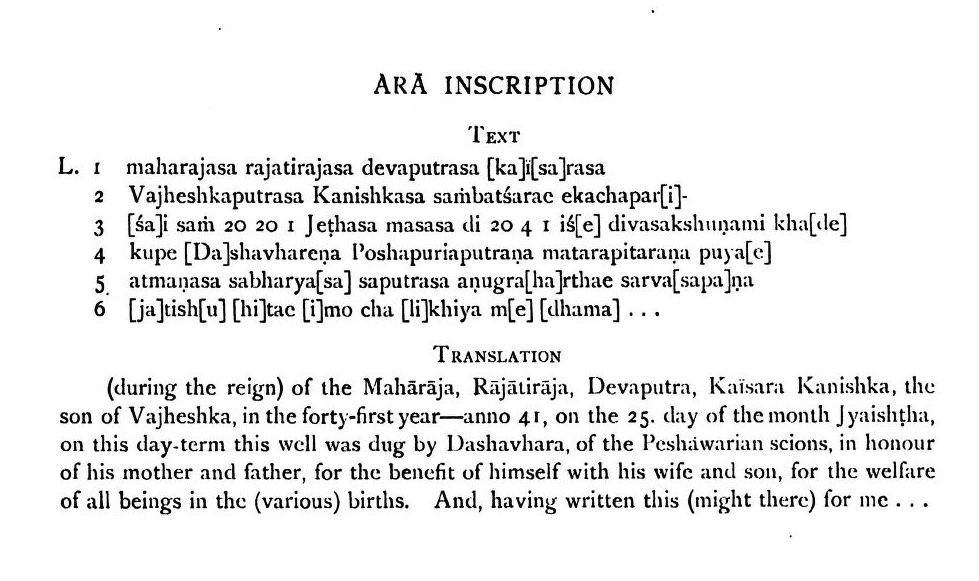
The Ara inscription of Kanishka III, in Kharoshthi, using the title Maharaja Rajatiraja Devaputra Kaisara Kanishka ("Great King, King of Kings, Son of God, Caesar, Kanishka)

=== Isapur inscription of Vasishka, Year 24 ===
An inscription in the name of Vasishka in pure Sanskrit in Middle Brahmi script, with his full imperial titles Mahārājasya rājātirājāsya devaputrasya Shāhe Vvāsishkasya ("Of the Great King, the King of kings, His Majesty, Shahi Vasishka") was found in Isapur (27.5115°N 77.6893°E), near the city of Mathura, on the shaft of a "Yupa", a sacrificial Brahmanical pillar, now in the Mathura Museum.

== Coinage ==
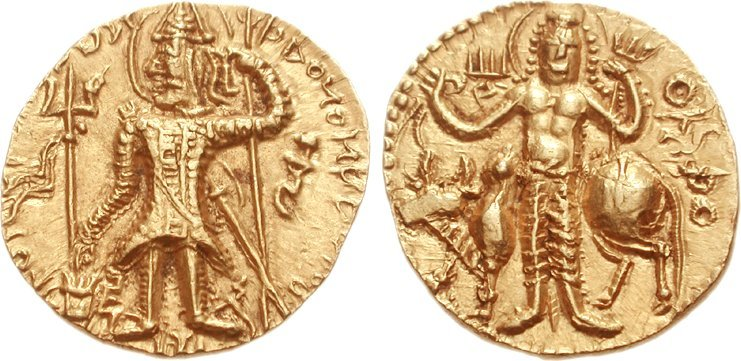
Gold Dinar of Vasishka (as Vaskushana). Oesho, probably Shiva, appears on the reverse. c. 240-250 CE

The coinage of Vasishka became smaller than his predecessors, being minted on increasingly small flans, and the metal quality becoming debased. The deities appearing on the reverse of his coinage are similar to those in the coins of Huvishka and Vasudeva I.

Several of Vāsishka's coins have been found together with those of the Kushano-Sasanian ruler Ardashir I Kushanshah, suggesting a level of rivalry and interaction between the two rulers.

The coins of Vasishka usually have the legend in Greco-Bactrian script þAONANOþAO BAZIþKO KOþANO "King of King Bazeshko Kushano".

Some coins with a slightly different name (Obverse legend þAONANOþAO BAZOΔΗO/BOZOΗO KOþANO "King of King Bazodeo the Kushan") have been attributed to "Vaskushana", generally equaled with Vasishka himself.

Preceded by Kanishka II	Kushan Ruler	Succeeded by Kanishka III

Territories/ dates	Western India	Western Pakistan Balochistan	Paropamisadae Arachosia	Bajaur	Gandhara	Western Punjab	Eastern Punjab	Mathura	Pataliputra
				INDO-SCYTHIAN KINGDOM			INDO-GREEK KINGDOM	INDO-SCYTHIAN Northern Satraps	
25 BCE – 10 CE				Indo-Scythian dynasty of the APRACHARAJAS; Vijayamitra (ruled 12 BCE – 15 CE) (Note: From the dated inscription on the Rukhana reliquary)	Liaka Kusulaka; Patika Kusulaka; Zeionises	Kharahostes (ruled 10 BCE– 10 CE); Mujatria	Strato II and Strato III	Hagana	
10-20CE		INDO-PARTHIAN KINGDOM; Gondophares		Indravasu	INDO-PARTHIAN KINGDOM; Gondophares		Rajuvula		
20–30 CE			Ubouzanes; Pakores	Vispavarma (ruled c. 0–20 CE)	Sarpedones		Bhadayasa	Sodasa	
30-40 CE			KUSHAN EMPIRE; Kujula Kadphises (c. 50–90)	Indravarma	Abdagases		...	...	
40–45 CE				Aspavarma	Gadana		...	...	
45–50 CE				Sasan	Sases		...	...	
50–75 CE							...	...	
75–100 CE	Indo-Scythian dynasty of the WESTERN SATRAPS; Chastana		Vima Takto (c. 90–113)				...	...	
100–120 CE	Abhiraka		Vima Kadphises (c. 113–127)						
120 CE	Bhumaka; Nahapana	PARATARAJAS; Yolamira	Kanishka I (c. 127–151)				Great Satrap Kharapallana and Satrap Vanaspara for Kanishka I		
130–230 CE	Jayadaman; Rudradaman I Damajadasri I Jivadaman; Rudrasimha I Isvaradatta; Rudrasimha I Jivadaman; Rudrasena I	Bagamira; Arjuna; Hvaramira; Mirahvara	Huvishka (c. 151 – c. 190); Vasudeva I (c. 190 – 230)						
230–250 CE	Samghadaman; Damasena; Damajadasri II; Viradaman; Yasodaman I Vijayasena; Damajadasri III; Rudrasena II; Visvasimha	Miratakhma; Kozana; Bhimarjuna; Koziya; Datarvharna; Datarvharna	KUSHANO-SASANIANS; Ardashir I (c. 230 – 250); Ardashir II (?-245)	Kanishka II (c. 230 – 247)					
250–280	Samghadaman; Damasena; Damajadasri II; Viradaman; Yasodaman I Vijayasena; Damajadasri III; Rudrasena II; Visvasimha	Miratakhma; Kozana; Bhimarjuna; Koziya; Datarvharna; Datarvharna	Peroz I, "Kushanshah" (c. 250 – 265); Hormizd I, "Kushanshah" (c. 265 – 295)			Vāsishka (c. 247 – 267); Kanishka III (c. 267 – 270)			
280–300	Bhratadarman	Datayola II	Hormizd II, "Kushanshah" (c. 295 – 300)			Vasudeva II (c. 267 – 300)		GUPTA EMPIRE; Chandragupta I Samudragupta; Chandragupta II	
300–320 CE	Visvasena; Rudrasimha II; Jivadaman		Peroz II, "Kushanshah" (c. 300 – 325)			Mahi (c. 300–305); Shaka (c. 305 – 335)		GUPTA EMPIRE; Chandragupta I Samudragupta; Chandragupta II	
320–388 CE	Yasodaman II; Rudradaman II; Rudrasena III; Simhasena; Rudrasena IV		Varahran I (325–350); Shapur II Sassanid king and "Kushanshah" (c. 350)			Kipunada (c. 335 – 350)		GUPTA EMPIRE; Chandragupta I Samudragupta; Chandragupta II	
388–396 CE	Rudrasimha III		KIDARITES invasion					GUPTA EMPIRE; Chandragupta I Samudragupta; Chandragupta II	
