= Shaka (Kushan) =

Kushan emperor from 300 to 350

- Kushan emperor
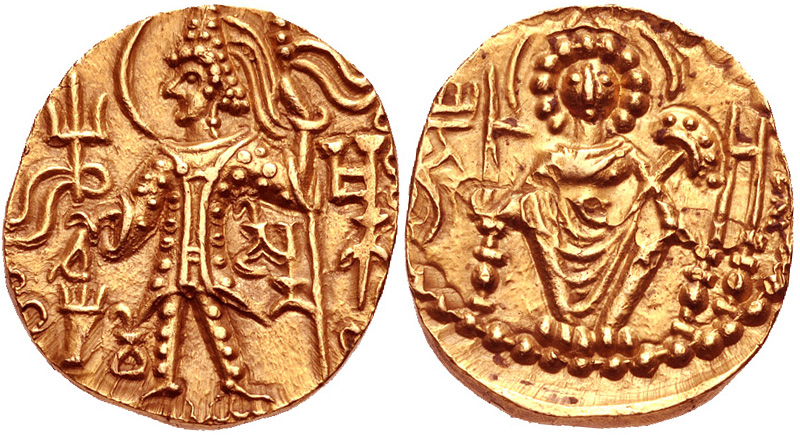
- Kushan Empire Shaka Circa 325–345. Obverse: King Shakā making a sacrifice over an altar. To the right of the altar: Vi. The name of the ruler appears vertically to the right of the king in Gupta script: Sha-kā. Under the arm of the ruler, also in Brahmi script: Si-ta.Traces of Greco-Bactrian legend around. Reverse: Ardoxsho enthroned, holding filleted investiture garland and cornucopia; tamgha to upper left.
- Reign: 300–350
- Predecessor: Vasudeva II
- Successor: Kipunada
- Born: 270
- Died: 350 (aged 79–80)
- Dynasty: Kushan Dynasty
- Father: Kanishka III

Shaka (Gupta script: Sha-kā) may have been one of the last rulers of the Kushan Empire around 325–345. He may have succeeded Vasudeva II. There is a group of Kushan gold coins that all carry the Brahmi legend Shaka in the right field, in the same place where Vasudeva II's coins read Vasu, so it is natural to suppose that perhaps Shaka was the name of the king who issued these coins. A further support for this idea is that there is a mention of one "Devaputra Shahi Shahanshahi Shaka Murunda" in Samudragupta's famous Allahabad inscription, as one of the rulers who paid him homage. In this context, Shaka could be a title, it could refer to a tribe, or it could be a personal name. In any case, it seems to be related to the Shaka coins. We do not know the date of the Allahabad inscription, so the best guess on dating Shaka is c. mid-4th century.

Robert Göbl, for instance, did not think Shaka was the name of a ruler; rather, he thought the coins were tribal issues, but Michael Mitchiner and many other authors do think Shaka was a personal name.

The Shaka coins all have the goddess Ardoxsho on the reverse, whether many other Kushan rulers are known to have used Oesho (probably Shiva with his bull) on the reverse of their coins.

There are also sources who use the term Shaka-Kushan as a label for a historic period that began sometime between 78 A.D. and 128 A.D. This included the reign of rulers bearing the name of Vasudeva. It was associated with several excavated remains in northern India, which revealed building activities as well as artifacts like red polished pottery, ceramics, and terracotta figures. The discovered remains showed sophisticated construction practices like the use of burnt bricks for flooring and tiles for flooring and roofing. The wares, including some coins, found in the Shaka-Kushana sites were also found in several locations in Delhi, Jhatikra Nahar near Najafgarh, and Gordon Highlanders near Badli ki Sarai. Archaeologists believe that this indicates contact among these contemporary settlements or that these sites were under the sphere of influence of the Shaka-Kushana empire.

== Footnotes ==
Preceded by Kanishka III	Kushan Ruler c. 325 – c. 345	Succeeded by Kipunada

Territories/ dates	Western India	Western Pakistan Balochistan	Paropamisadae Arachosia	Bajaur	Gandhara	Western Punjab	Eastern Punjab	Mathura	Pataliputra
				INDO-SCYTHIAN KINGDOM			INDO-GREEK KINGDOM	INDO-SCYTHIAN Northern Satraps	
25 BCE – 10 CE				Indo-Scythian dynasty of the APRACHARAJAS; Vijayamitra (ruled 12 BCE – 15 CE) (Note: From the dated inscription on the Rukhana reliquary)	Liaka Kusulaka; Patika Kusulaka; Zeionises	Kharahostes (ruled 10 BCE– 10 CE); Mujatria	Strato II and Strato III	Hagana	
10-20CE		INDO-PARTHIAN KINGDOM; Gondophares		Indravasu	INDO-PARTHIAN KINGDOM; Gondophares		Rajuvula		
20–30 CE			Ubouzanes; Pakores	Vispavarma (ruled c. 0–20 CE)	Sarpedones		Bhadayasa	Sodasa	
30-40 CE			KUSHAN EMPIRE; Kujula Kadphises (c. 50–90)	Indravarma	Abdagases		...	...	
40–45 CE				Aspavarma	Gadana		...	...	
45–50 CE				Sasan	Sases		...	...	
50–75 CE							...	...	
75–100 CE	Indo-Scythian dynasty of the WESTERN SATRAPS; Chastana		Vima Takto (c. 90–113)				...	...	
100–120 CE	Abhiraka		Vima Kadphises (c. 113–127)						
120 CE	Bhumaka; Nahapana	PARATARAJAS; Yolamira	Kanishka I (c. 127–151)				Great Satrap Kharapallana and Satrap Vanaspara for Kanishka I		
130–230 CE	Jayadaman; Rudradaman I Damajadasri I Jivadaman; Rudrasimha I Isvaradatta; Rudrasimha I Jivadaman; Rudrasena I	Bagamira; Arjuna; Hvaramira; Mirahvara	Huvishka (c. 151 – c. 190); Vasudeva I (c. 190 – 230)						
230–250 CE	Samghadaman; Damasena; Damajadasri II; Viradaman; Yasodaman I Vijayasena; Damajadasri III; Rudrasena II; Visvasimha	Miratakhma; Kozana; Bhimarjuna; Koziya; Datarvharna; Datarvharna	KUSHANO-SASANIANS; Ardashir I (c. 230 – 250); Ardashir II (?-245)	Kanishka II (c. 230 – 247)					
250–280	Samghadaman; Damasena; Damajadasri II; Viradaman; Yasodaman I Vijayasena; Damajadasri III; Rudrasena II; Visvasimha	Miratakhma; Kozana; Bhimarjuna; Koziya; Datarvharna; Datarvharna	Peroz I, "Kushanshah" (c. 250 – 265); Hormizd I, "Kushanshah" (c. 265 – 295)			Vāsishka (c. 247 – 267); Kanishka III (c. 267 – 270)			
280–300	Bhratadarman	Datayola II	Hormizd II, "Kushanshah" (c. 295 – 300)			Vasudeva II (c. 267 – 300)		GUPTA EMPIRE; Chandragupta I Samudragupta; Chandragupta II	
300–320 CE	Visvasena; Rudrasimha II; Jivadaman		Peroz II, "Kushanshah" (c. 300 – 325)			Mahi (c. 300–305); Shaka (c. 305 – 335)		GUPTA EMPIRE; Chandragupta I Samudragupta; Chandragupta II	
320–388 CE	Yasodaman II; Rudradaman II; Rudrasena III; Simhasena; Rudrasena IV		Varahran I (325–350); Shapur II Sassanid king and "Kushanshah" (c. 350)			Kipunada (c. 335 – 350)		GUPTA EMPIRE; Chandragupta I Samudragupta; Chandragupta II	
388–396 CE	Rudrasimha III		KIDARITES invasion					GUPTA EMPIRE; Chandragupta I Samudragupta; Chandragupta II	
