= Basudev (disambiguation) =

Basudev refers to the 1984 Nepali film directed by Neer Shah.

Basudev may also refer to:

- Krishna, a major Hindu deity also known as Basudev, Basudeb, Vasudev or Vasudeva
- Vasudeva, father of Krishna
- Basudev (name)

== See also ==
- Vasudev (disambiguation)
- Vasudeva (disambiguation)
