= Vasudev =

Vasudev may refer to

- Vasudeva, father of Krishna in Indian epics
- Vasudev (name)
- Vakkeel Vasudev, a 1993 Indian Malayalam film

== See also ==
- Vasudeva (disambiguation)
- Basudev (disambiguation)
