= Vasudeva IV =

Vasudeva IV was reportedly a king ruling one the remnants of the Kushan Kingdom from Kandahar. He was possibly the father of Vasudeva of Kabul.

Preceded by Vasudeva III	Kushan Ruler	Succeeded by Vasudeva of Kabul

Territories/ dates	Western India	Western Pakistan Balochistan	Paropamisadae Arachosia	Bajaur	Gandhara	Western Punjab	Eastern Punjab	Mathura	Pataliputra
				INDO-SCYTHIAN KINGDOM			INDO-GREEK KINGDOM	INDO-SCYTHIAN Northern Satraps	
25 BCE – 10 CE				Indo-Scythian dynasty of the APRACHARAJAS; Vijayamitra (ruled 12 BCE – 15 CE) (Note: From the dated inscription on the Rukhana reliquary)	Liaka Kusulaka; Patika Kusulaka; Zeionises	Kharahostes (ruled 10 BCE– 10 CE); Mujatria	Strato II and Strato III	Hagana	
10-20CE		INDO-PARTHIAN KINGDOM; Gondophares		Indravasu	INDO-PARTHIAN KINGDOM; Gondophares		Rajuvula		
20–30 CE			Ubouzanes; Pakores	Vispavarma (ruled c. 0–20 CE)	Sarpedones		Bhadayasa	Sodasa	
30-40 CE			KUSHAN EMPIRE; Kujula Kadphises (c. 50–90)	Indravarma	Abdagases		...	...	
40–45 CE				Aspavarma	Gadana		...	...	
45–50 CE				Sasan	Sases		...	...	
50–75 CE							...	...	
75–100 CE	Indo-Scythian dynasty of the WESTERN SATRAPS; Chastana		Vima Takto (c. 90–113)				...	...	
100–120 CE	Abhiraka		Vima Kadphises (c. 113–127)						
120 CE	Bhumaka; Nahapana	PARATARAJAS; Yolamira	Kanishka I (c. 127–151)				Great Satrap Kharapallana and Satrap Vanaspara for Kanishka I		
130–230 CE	Jayadaman; Rudradaman I Damajadasri I Jivadaman; Rudrasimha I Isvaradatta; Rudrasimha I Jivadaman; Rudrasena I	Bagamira; Arjuna; Hvaramira; Mirahvara	Huvishka (c. 151 – c. 190); Vasudeva I (c. 190 – 230)						
230–250 CE	Samghadaman; Damasena; Damajadasri II; Viradaman; Yasodaman I Vijayasena; Damajadasri III; Rudrasena II; Visvasimha	Miratakhma; Kozana; Bhimarjuna; Koziya; Datarvharna; Datarvharna	KUSHANO-SASANIANS; Ardashir I (c. 230 – 250); Ardashir II (?-245)	Kanishka II (c. 230 – 247)					
250–280	Samghadaman; Damasena; Damajadasri II; Viradaman; Yasodaman I Vijayasena; Damajadasri III; Rudrasena II; Visvasimha	Miratakhma; Kozana; Bhimarjuna; Koziya; Datarvharna; Datarvharna	Peroz I, "Kushanshah" (c. 250 – 265); Hormizd I, "Kushanshah" (c. 265 – 295)			Vāsishka (c. 247 – 267); Kanishka III (c. 267 – 270)			
280–300	Bhratadarman	Datayola II	Hormizd II, "Kushanshah" (c. 295 – 300)			Vasudeva II (c. 267 – 300)		GUPTA EMPIRE; Chandragupta I Samudragupta; Chandragupta II	
300–320 CE	Visvasena; Rudrasimha II; Jivadaman		Peroz II, "Kushanshah" (c. 300 – 325)			Mahi (c. 300–305); Shaka (c. 305 – 335)		GUPTA EMPIRE; Chandragupta I Samudragupta; Chandragupta II	
320–388 CE	Yasodaman II; Rudradaman II; Rudrasena III; Simhasena; Rudrasena IV		Varahran I (325–350); Shapur II Sassanid king and "Kushanshah" (c. 350)			Kipunada (c. 335 – 350)		GUPTA EMPIRE; Chandragupta I Samudragupta; Chandragupta II	
388–396 CE	Rudrasimha III		KIDARITES invasion					GUPTA EMPIRE; Chandragupta I Samudragupta; Chandragupta II	
