= Basudev (name) =

Basudev is a South Asian given name and surname. Notable people with the name include:

- Basudev Chatterji (1949–2017), historian, writer and professor of History at the University of Delhi
- C. Basudev, 20th century Indian labour unionist
