= Vayu-Vata =

Avestan deity of wind and atmosphere

Vayu-Vata Avestan: 𐬬𐬀𐬌𐬌𐬎-𐬬𐬁𐬙𐬀
- God of the wind, storm, atmosphere, space, life and death
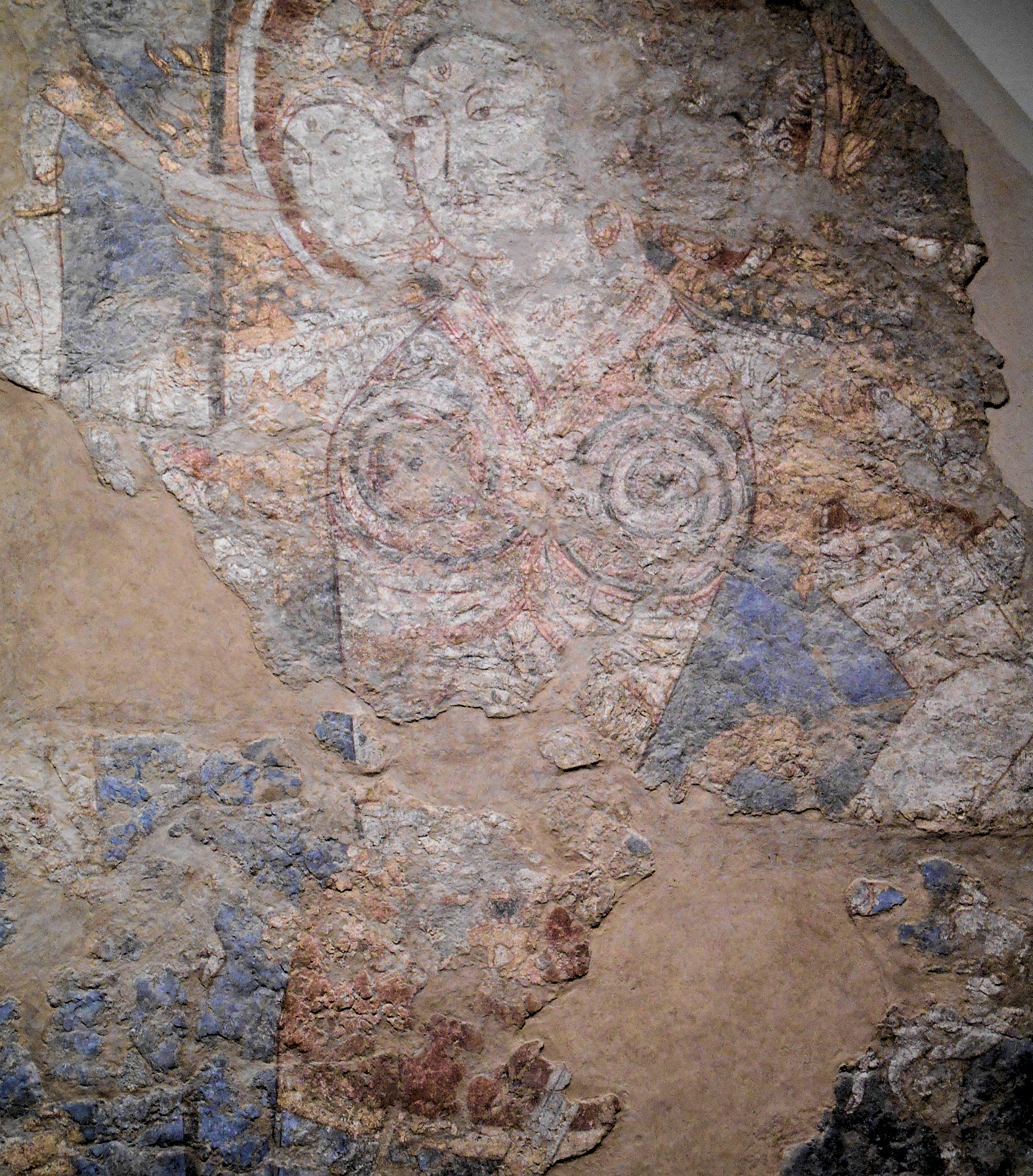
- Depiction of Vayu-Vata (as Weshparkar) on a mural from Panjikent
- Other names: Vay, Vaybe, Vaybod, Andarva, Vayu, Vata, Way, Wad, Oado, Oesho, Wesh, Weshparkar, Muzhduwan, Burzāwand Yazad
- Affiliation: The Thirty-Three Deities, Guardians of the Days of the Month, Four Elements
- Major cult centre: Ushrusana
- Weapons: Trident, bow and arrow
- Symbol: Lightning, rain and storm, void
- Attributes: War, storm, fertility, death, life, rain, wind
- Gender: Male
- Festivals: Wind Day

Equivalents
- Hindu: Shiva

Vayu-Vata (Avestan: 𐬬𐬀𐬌𐬌𐬎-𐬬𐬁𐬙𐬀, romanized: Vayu-Vata, lit. 'air, wind, atmosphere'; Avestan pronunciation: [ʋɑːju-ʋɑːt̪ə]), also known as Way and Wad in Middle Persian, is an ancient Yazata and dual-natured god of the wind, storms, cosmic space, the air, the breath of life, and the final breath of death. He features predominantly across ancient Iranian religions and Zoroastrianism. Vayu and Vata were originally two distinct deities in the Avesta, with Vata associated more with the tangible wind that blows, while Vayu was the calm and still air, more frequently mentioned, and much more of a personified deity than the more impersonal Vata (lit. "wind"), yet they often overlapped and represented one another in earlier tradition. Both names also appear in other contexts within the Avesta. The war god Bahram incarnates as blowing winds (Vata) while one of the four horses that draw the chariot of the water goddess Anahid is named as Vayu, representnig storm.

The distinction between Vayu and Vata continued into later Iranian traditions, but they were often confused with one another. Vata persisted as Wad in Middle Iranian languages, becoming Oaao or Oado in Kushan Bactria. Vayu survived as Oesho, but with the separation of their identities faltering among the lower classes of society, many inscriptions used their names interchangeably, thereby conjoining the two gods.

The worship of Vayu-Vata would extend into Central Asia, where his Bactrian name, Oesho was adopted by the Sogdians as Weshparkar or Veshparkar. There, he was primarily venerated as a wind god, and judging by the number of surviving inscriptions, he ranked third among Sogdian deities. He was revered by Sogdian Buddhists, adherents of Panjakent religion, and Manicheans.

== Etymology ==
The Avestan names Vayu and Vata derive from the same verbal root vā-, meaning "to blow", and appear to have originally been used as synonyms for wind. The name Vayu is a primary derivative formed with the suffix -yu- from Indo-European √H2weH1-, a formation relatively rare in Indo-Iranian, with the only other common example being Vedic manyú- and Avestan mainyu-. Vedic vā́ta- and Gathic Avestan Vata- (Y. 44.4) are sometimes trisyllabic, va’ata-, deriving from H2weH1-n̥t-o-. The tradition preserved in Yašt 15 also attempted an etymological explanation of the name vayu-. Derivatives of Vata- remain in common use for "wind" in living Iranian languages. The continuity of Vayu's identity across these traditions is also reflected in his names. As H. Humbach observed, Sogdian Buddhist wyšprkr (/Weshparkar/) is an eastern Iranian form of the Old Iranian divine name and epithet attested in Avestan as vayuš uparō.kairyō.

== History and development ==
=== Vayu and Vata in the Avesta ===
While both Vayu and Vata had strong associations with the wind, in the case of Vayu, due to his more complex nature and him clearly being the mightier god of the two, the natural phenomenon faded much further into the background in his characterization, strongly suggesting he was a more ancient god than Vata. While the Vedic tradition mirrors the Avesta concerning the pair's relationship, there is not much else closely in common between the equivalents of these deities in the Vedas and the Avesta.

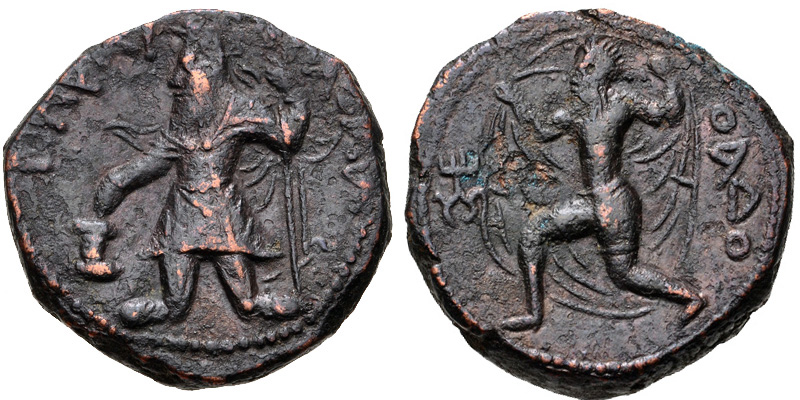
Vayu-Vata (right) on the inverse of a Kushan coin

Vayu variably appears as a powerful warrior god protecting the creation of Spenta Mainyu and a dreaded death-god. He is understood through his epithets, such as uparō.kairya-, meaning "having superior skill", and he is described as strong (uγra-), swift (aurwa-), and fleet (taxma-). Alternatively Vata was conceived by the Indo-Iranians as the wind that moved from time to time in the space or empty void between the solid earth beneath the feet of men and what they regarded as the solid dome of the sky above their heads. Since the wind brings rain, "bold Vata" was regarded as a helper of Tishtar and Sadwesh, aiding them in drawing up the waters and scattering the clouds. The identification of the god with the natural phenomenon was so close that translators sometimes have difficulty determining whether a particular passage refers to the wind-god or to the wind itself.

In the Avesta, Vayu is presented as superior not only to Spənta Mainyu, the Beneficent Spirit, and Ahriman, the Evil Spirit, but also to Ohrmazd himself, who must entreat Vayu for aid. His dominion over both creations suggests that, in some circles, Vayu enjoyed a universality that overshadowed both Ohrmazd and Ahriman, therefore Vayu may have been the supreme deity of a particular community, just as Ohrmazd and Mithra may have been supreme within their own respective communities. The idea of rival sectarian communities in pre-Zoroastrian Iran has, however, generally been ignored by scholars. Ancient Iranians, like their Vedic counterparts, entertained a variety of conceptions regarding creation and the formation of the cosmos. Vayu was also distinguished as having two opposing natures in one, where only his good nature, "belonging to the bounteous spirit" was worshipped, and not his "harmful" (Zinaka) nature. These came to be known as the Good Vayu (Way-e Weh) and Bad Vayu (Way-e Wattar). The latter was little more than a demon of death, identified in the Bundahishn with Astwihad, the Div of death, who just like Vayu, takes away the breath-soul, thereby causing death. To differentiate his two natures, the Good Vayu was said in the Pahlavi commentaries to "carry the righteous soul to heaven", while the Bad Vayu "led the soul away", his gaze said to destroy the breath-soul (final breath), his shadow to bring fever and his touch to cause lethargy.

The divinities Ohrmazd, Nana and Vayu-Vata depicted from left to right

=== Identification as Raman and role in Zurvanite theology ===
Raman Khvashtra was another Avestan divinity that merged with Vayu. Originally the god of peace and tranquility, Raman's hymn, titled Ram Yasht, has been completely overtaken by the veneration of Vayu, and the two came to be associated due to Vayu's possession of "good pastures" as the god of the air, which where understood as great expanses of the sky inhabited by clouds, conceived as celestial "cows" whose milk was the rain. Another explanation, preserved in Middle Iranian texts, relates the association to Vayu's role in guiding the souls of the righteous to Paradise, where the Good Vayu is called Ram, a word that signifies both joy and peace, because he brings joy to the souls he guides. Vayu may also have been associated with the bull, as suggested by references in the Ram Yasht. the bull may have constituted an important element of Vayu worship, highlighting the deity's close relationship with herds of domesticated animals. In Zoroastrianism, the bull is also associated with fertility, which depends upon an adequate supply of water, including the rain brought by Vayu. Furthermore, in the Sirozag, the Zoroastrian liturgical calendar, where the twenty-first day of the month is dedicated to Raman, the gods Vayu, Sepehr, infinite time (zrwan- akarana-) and the time of long dominion (zrwan- darəγō.xwaδāta-) are invoked along with him. This is notable for Vayu appears here under Raman's day, as opposed to the twenty-second day which is dedicated to Vata.

The invocation of Vayu alongside Zurvan (time) and Sepehr (space) further associates him with time and space respectively, which becomes relevant in later Pahlavi sources that identify a conception of primordial cosmos as characterized by infinite Space (Vayu) and infinite time (Zurvan), from which the dualities of finite space and finite time developed as necessary conditions for the creation of the world. The Bundahishn also identifies Vayu as the primordial Void that existed between Ohrmazd and Ahriman, presumably contributing to his association with Time (Zurvan) and the Firmament (Thwasha) in later tradition. Nothing in Vayu's hymn's suggests the deity's pagan worshipped contained any of these later characteristics.

=== Transformation in Kushan Bactria ===
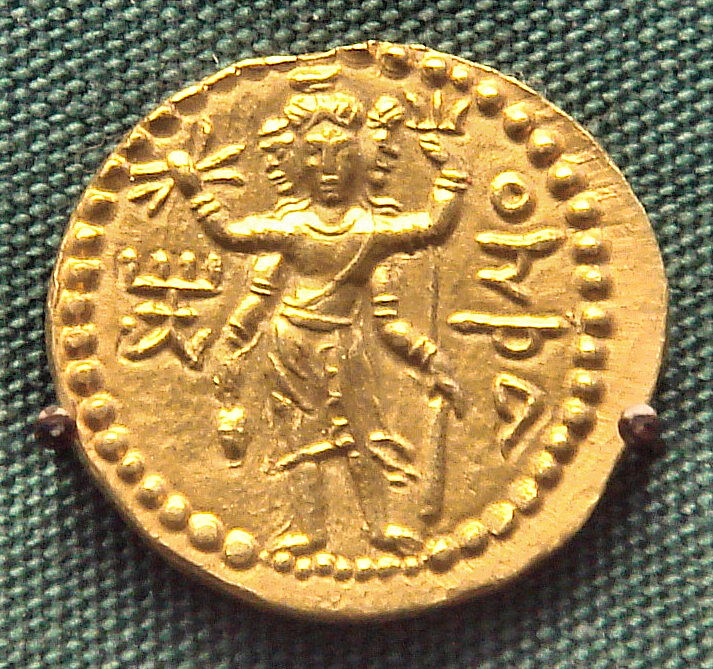
A depiction of Vayu-Vata (Oesho) on the inverse of a Kushan coin, taking the appearance of Shiva

Vayu continued to be worshipped in Bactria during the Kushan period under the name Oesho, retaining the aggressive and warlike characteristics associated with the earlier Iranian god. Vayu and Vata also underwent a gradual divergence during this period, with their formerly overlapping functions developing along separate lines. In the Kushan pantheon, Vayu emerged as one of the most prominent deities and was probably regarded as the consort of Nana, who alongside Mah, Mithra and Vayu himself were among the four principal or most frequently attested deities. These deities were represented in pairs, with Mah associating with Mithra and Vayu with Nana. Vayu also became closely associated with Shiva, increasingly reflected in the deity's Shivite appearance during the Kushan period.

Vata, known to the Bactrians as Oado, retained the characteristics of the wind god in a narrow sense. While Vata represented the anthropomorphic wind deity, neither textual nor iconographic sources indicate that Vayu in this period was particularly associated with the physical wind. Vata was depicted on Kushan coins and incorporated into theophoric names such as Tiroado, linking him to the deity Tir, but is otherwise unattested in Bactrian sources. The theological development of the two divinities, together with the increasing resemblance of Vayu to Shiva during the Kushan period, may not have resulted solely from Indian religious influence, but may also have occurred in parallel with developments in India because Rudra, who was later associated with Shiva, and had likewise originated as a wind and storm god, whereas wind was no longer a principal characteristic of the later Shiva, running parallel to the differentiation of Vayu and Vata in this period

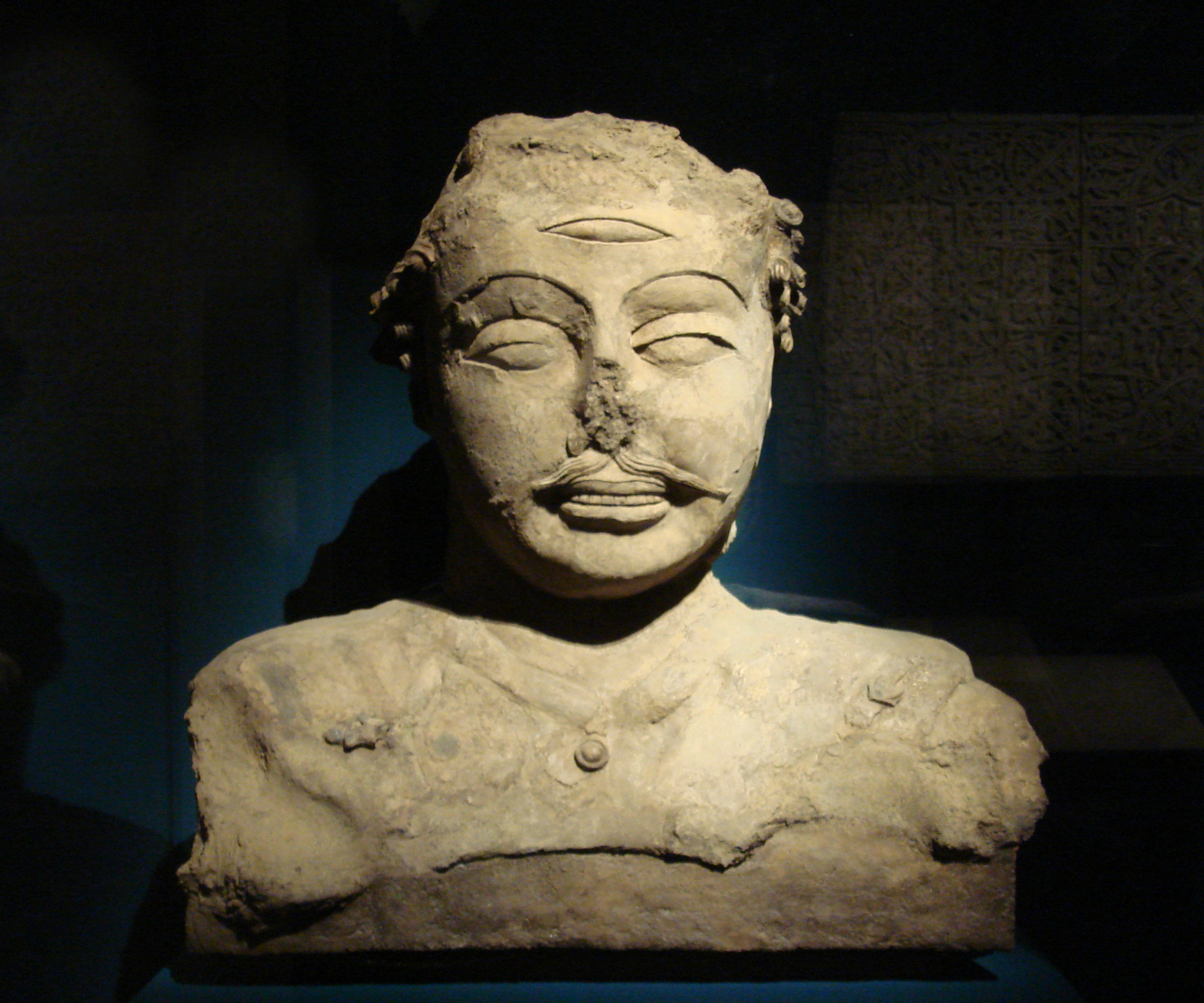
A statue representing Vayu-Vata (Weshparkar)

The separation of the two deities however was impermanent, as Vata was subsequently replaced in his functions as a wind-god entirely by Vayu, finalizing the fusion of the two divinities. In Bactria, several iconographic elements of Greek gods were also assigned to Vayu-Vata, such as the trident of Poseidon, signifying his characterization as god of sea-storms, which replaced his previous depictions with the club of Heracles, interpreted as a reduction in Vayu-Vata's martial character and a greater emphasis on his role as a fertility deity and bringer of rain.

Another name for Vayu-Vata in Bactria was Muzhduwan, an epithet of possible Shivite origins. Muzhduwan appears on Kushan coins and in the Rabatak inscription where the name is rendered as "μοζδοοανο". The exact origins and significance of the name are unclear, but it likely derives from Mizhdwah, meaning "gracious", possibly the name of a horse-deity of the steppe worshipped in the early Kushan or early Kushan period. Muzhdwan likewise bears a trident on Kushan coinage. Muzhdwan was alternatively connected to the Rig Vedic god Rudra, who was subsequently merged with Shiva. These interpretations have been discussed in connection with Vayu-Vata's absence from the Rabatak inscription under his familiar name, despite his prominence throughout Bactrian religious history.

Another title used by the Kushano-Sassanian rulers of Bactria for this deity was borzoando iazado or bago borzando in Bactrian, and burzawand yazad in Middle Persian, meaning "the exalted god". In both the Sassanian and Bactrian pantheons, which developed some level of symmetry with each other, a triad of deities, namely Ohrmazd, Mithra and Anahid were represented at the pinnacle of the divine hierarchy, however for the Kushano-Sassnians, Ohrmazd was equivocated with Vayu-Vata, and therefore replaced, since the Bactrians likely thought Vayu-Vata was a local equivalent of Ohrmazd.

=== Continuation in Sogdiana ===
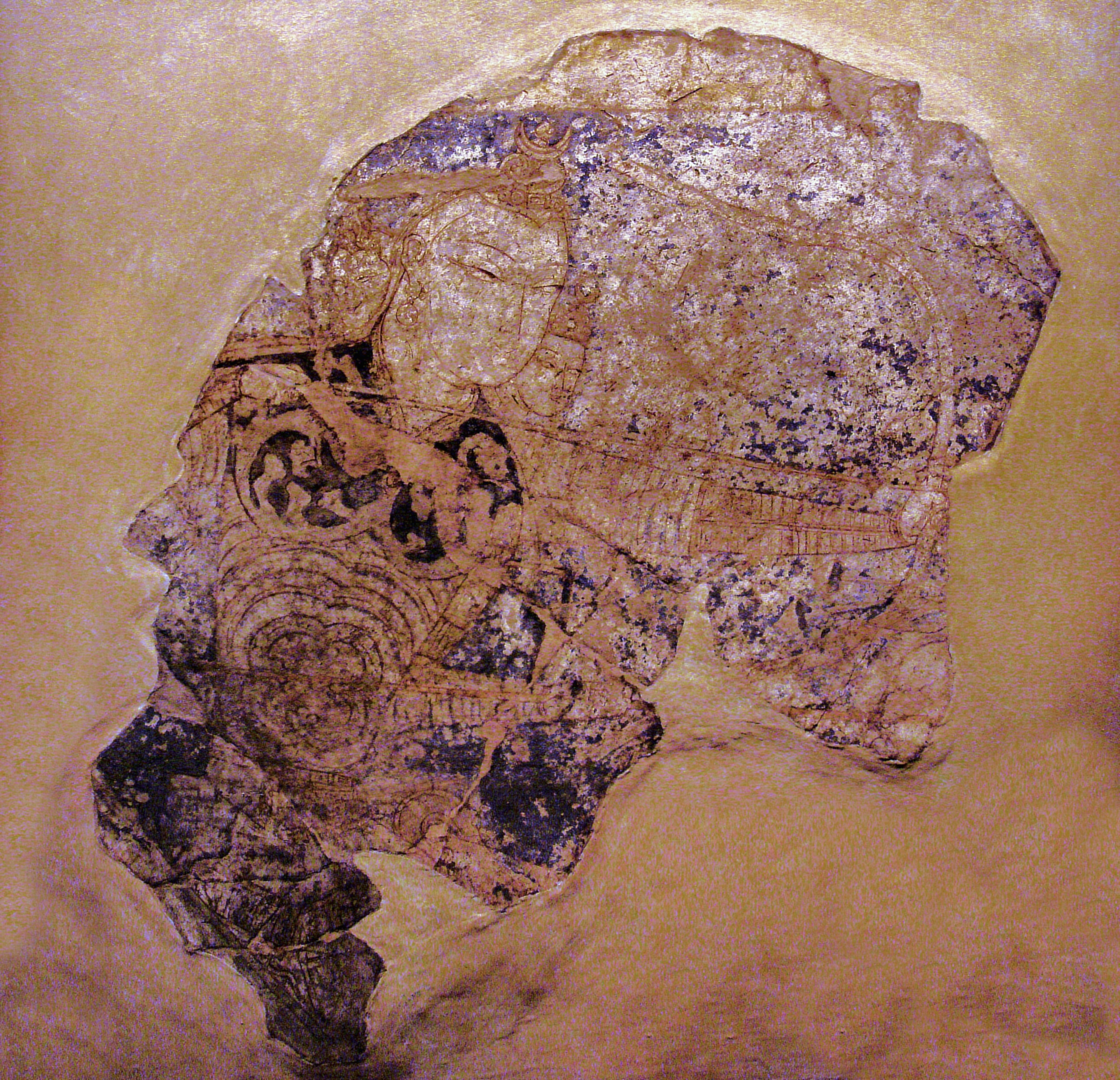
A panel from Kala-i Kakhakakha depicting Vayu-Vata (Weshparkar)

The worship of Vayu-Vata continued on from Bactria to Sogdia, where he was known as Weshparkar or Veshparkar. His Sogdian name harkens back to his full Avestan form, Vayuš uparō.kairiiō, "The Vayu who acts in the superior region". H. Humbach's interpretation of the name as Vayuš uparō kairyo, or "Vayu working on high", has consequently been regarded as more reasonable.

While the relationship of Vayu-Vata and Shiva is a subject of debate, it is increasingly clear that in his Bactrian form of Oesho, and as depicted on Kushan coins, Vayu-Vata cannot be identified with Shiva. However Weshparkar, his Sogdian form, did synchronize with the Indian deity, attributed to the influence of Hindu iconography during the seventh and eighth centuries.

As one of the three principal deities of Sogdian religion, numerous depictions of Vayu-Vata survive. One such painting, from a private house and explicitly labelled Weshparkar, shows one of the deity's three heads blowing a horn. Although the horn is not a customary attribute of Shiva, it is appropriate to the Iranian Vayu-Vata in his capacity as god of the atmosphere. This emphasis on natural elements is further reflected in the figure seated before Weshparkar, identified as Burz Yazad, the Indo-Iranian deity of the fire that burns within water.

== Iconography ==
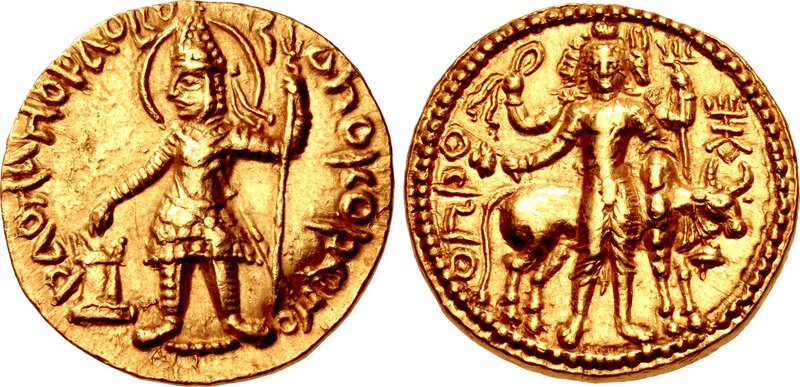
Vayu-Vata (Oesho) with a bull and trident on the inverse of a Kushan coin

Vayu-Vata features on Kushan coinage, with coins of Vima II Kadphises among the earliest examples. He is depicted with a bull, interpreted not as Nandi or Vrsbha, the bulls of Shiva, but as an animalistic representation of the Iranian war-god Bahram, who bestows Khwarrah (royal glory) upon the king. Vayu-Vata is depicted holding the Khwarrah as a ring, diadem or fillet on the coins of Kanishka I, Vasudeva I, Vasudeva II, Kanishka II, and Kanishka III.

Alternatively the Bactrian camel and humped bull are thought to represent his functions as a warrior god and bringer of rain and fertility respectively, with the camel, virtue of functional associations between Heracles and Bahram, being anthropomorphized on the reverse of Vima II Kadphises' coins. Vayu-Vata also holds a thunderbolt, or Vajra, on the coins of Kanishka I, probably imitated from Vajrapani in Buddhist reliefs of Gandhara, some of whose representations were themselves derived from images of Heracles. This Vajra, held by Heracles-Vajrapani, however, belonged originally to Indra-Verethragna, the Indo-Iranian predecessor to Avestan Bahram and Vedic Indra, while Vajrapani itself, meaning "holding a Vajra", was also an epithet of Indra.

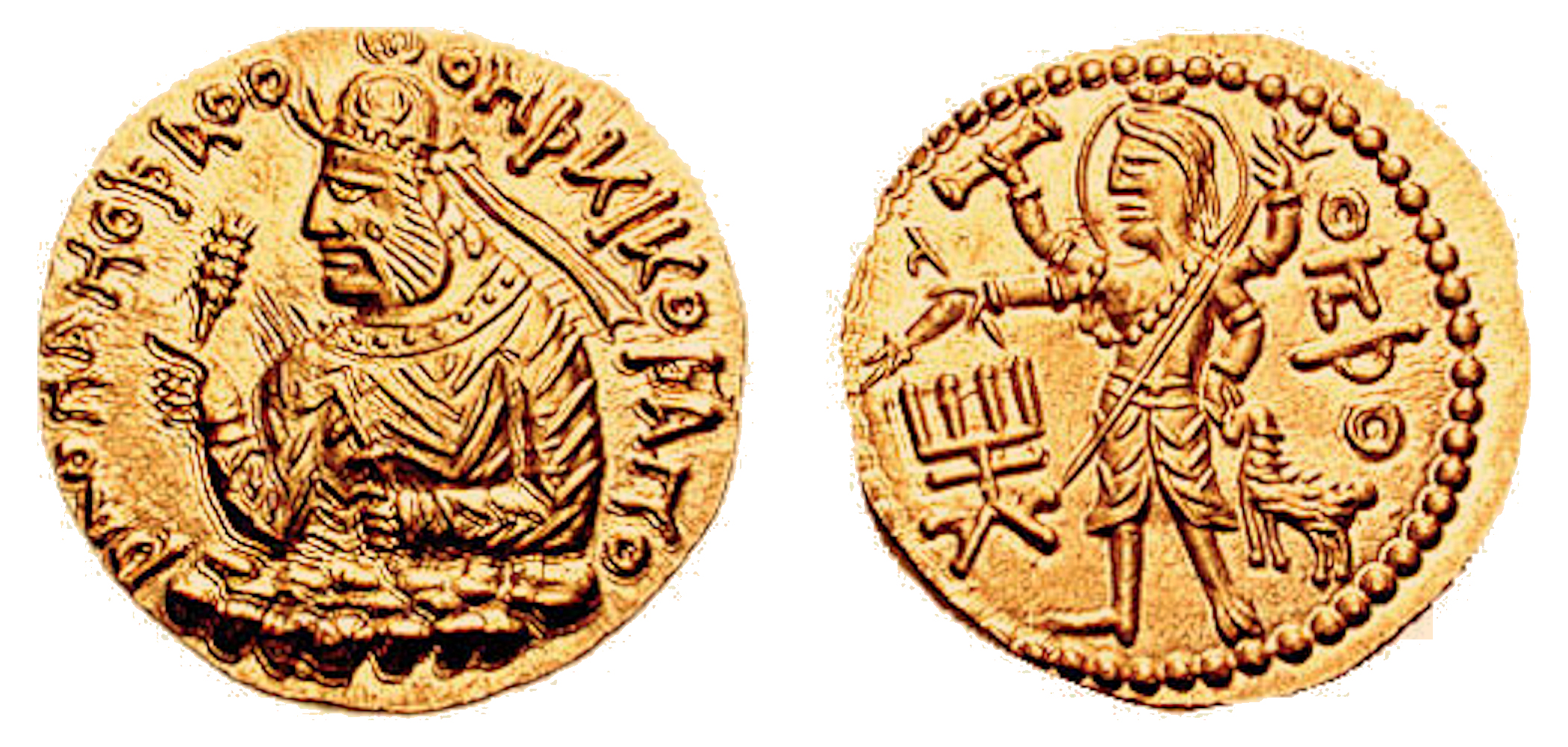
Vayu-Vata (Oesho) depicted holding a vajra and trident

By the time Huvishka's coins were struck, Vayu-Vata's representation had acquired three heads, four arms, and a trident. The three-headed appearance of Vayu-Vata on Kushan coins later continued into his depictions in Sogdia, being likewise represented by three heads and four arms. The significance of the three faces is interpreted differently, with M. Boyce regarded them as an expression of Vayu-Vata's great power and his capacity to sustain and destroy all things, comparable to Shiva. Another interpretation proposes that the two lateral heads of the three-headed Oesho and Weshparkar symbolize the opposing aspects of Vayu-Vata, Way-e Weh (Good Vay), and Way-e Wattar (Bad Vayu). The similarities between Vayu-Vata's eastern Iranian depictions with those of Shiva became difficult to discern, particularly in depictions such as that of a dancing deity in the "pose of an archer".

== Mythology and worship ==
Vayu-Vata appears in the myths of both Ardwisur Anahid and Tishtar, described as one of the four horses drawing the chariot of the former, and aiding the latter in his struggle to bring rain to the world. In Tishtar's myth, after rising again from the sea of Vourukasha, he calls to the wind-god, who drives the rain clouds and clouds upon places, dwellings and the seven lands. This association is further reflected when he is named as one of the Hamkars (divine assistants) of Khordad, who cares for the waters, alongside Tishtar and the Fravahars.

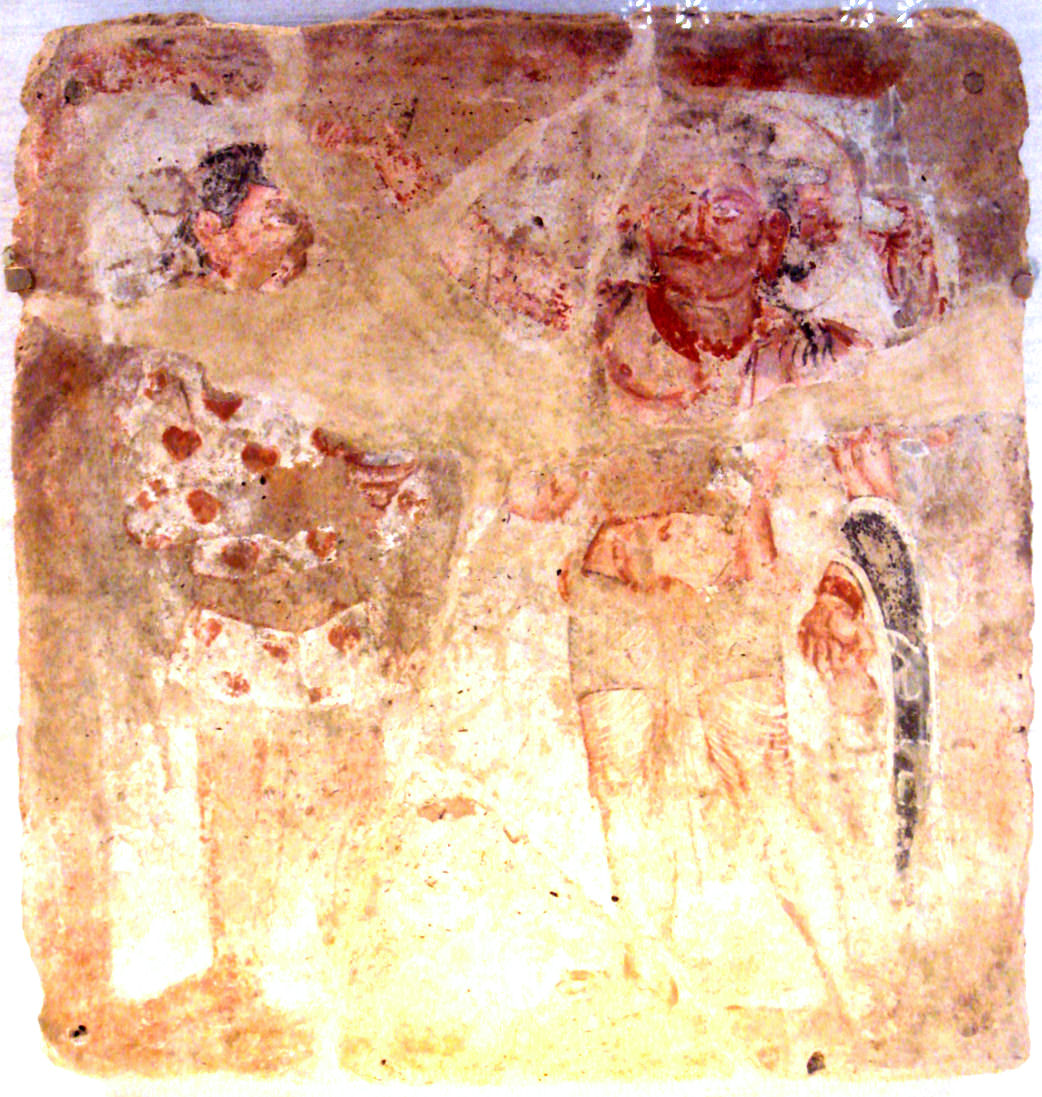
Vayu-Vata (Oesho) rendered with a worshipper

In appearance, Vayu-Vata is broad-chested, broad-hipped, high-stepping (bərəzi.pāδa-), and high-girdled. He wears a golden helmet, cape, necklace, vestment, shoes, and girdle. He is a warrior who rides a golden chariot with golden wheels, whose yoke-straps are firm. His weapons are golden, and he carries a sharp spear with a broad blade and impetuous thrusts. Given this image of the god, it is not surprising that the Bundahishn identifies him as the patron of the warrior or noble caste, the Arteshtaran.

Yet Vayu-Vata's power extended far beyond the battlefield, encompassing life and death themselves. The ancient Aryans perceived in Vayu both the physical wind (lit. Vata), rushing forth in storms with irresistible violence and swiftness, and the primordial cosmic principle of life. Within every living being, Vayu was the life-breath, just as within the cosmos he was the breath of life itself. Yet he was also the final breath exhaled by the dying, making him at once the god of life and the god of death. His power extended over both creations, that of the Beneficent Spirit and that of the Evil Spirit, neither of which could escape his reach. He hunted, overtook, and vanquished both, holding all life within his power. As lord of life and death, Vayu was therefore both kindly and cruel, a warrior god clad in golden armor and riding a golden chariot, the swiftest, strongest, and mightiest, who conquered with a single blow. In one verse of his Yasht, he declares that he carries off the man who has been bound, which later tradition suggests refers to a man already fettered by death. Since all men must eventually meet this fate, Vayu-Vata bears the exclusive epithet "all-conqueror" (vanõ.vispa-). The Aogəmadaēcā likewise celebrates his ruthlessness, declaring that even the strongest and most courageous man may overcome every other danger, but "only the path of the pitiless Vayu-Vata can never be avoided". This in itself appears sufficient to account for the awe which Vayu-Vata inspired, and the dread which in one aspect he aroused.

In Aogəmadaēcā, verses 78–81 enumerate paths of dire circumstances from which one may escape, but not that "which belongs to merciless Vayu" (yō vayaōš anamarəždikahe), marking the inescapability of death once more, and in worship, Vayu-Vata's beneficent nature was invoked, and so when Ohrmazd entreats the deity, the boon he asks for is "that I may strike down the creatures of Ahriman, by no means what belongs to the Spenta Mainyu". Likewise, when worshippers invoke Vayu-Vata, they do so with the formula: "We worship that (nature) of thine, o Vayu, which belongs to Spənta Mainyu".

The Good Vayu of long-dominion, who had merged with Raman, was particularly responsible for leadership of warriors, and when the soul (gyan) of a rightesou person corssed the Chinvat Bridge, the Good Vayu took it by the hand and guided it to its proper destination. The Good Vayu was also calleld Ram because he was the giver of pleasures, (rāmišn-dādār) to the whole world, and when the Bad Vayu struck the life-breath from the body, the Good Vayu received it and gave it contentment. Although this myth is a late editorial compilation of various sources, much of which was assembled by a redactor who possibly understood little Avestan.
