= Vasudev (name) =

Vasudev is an Indian name that may refer to

Given name

- Vasudeva (Chahamana dynasty), 16th century Indian king
- Vasudev Balwant Phadke (1845–1883), Indian freedom fighter
- Vasudev Devnani, Indian politician
- Vasudev Salgaocar (1916–1984), Indian businessman
- Vasudev V. Shenoy (1940–2015), Indian educationist and journalist
- Vasudev Vishnu Mirashi (1893–1985), Indian Sanskrit scholar

Surname

- Aditi Vasudev, 20th century Indian film actress
- Ganesh Vasudev Mavalankar (1888–1956), Indian independence activist
- Jaggi Vasudev, Indian yogi
- Madhukar Vasudev Dhond (1914–2007), Indian literary and art critic
- P. Kumar Vasudev, Indian television director
- S. G. Vasudev (born 1941), Indian artist
- Vishnu Vasudev Narlikar (1908–1991), Indian physicist
