= Kanishka II =

Kushan emperor from 230 to 247

- Kushan emperor
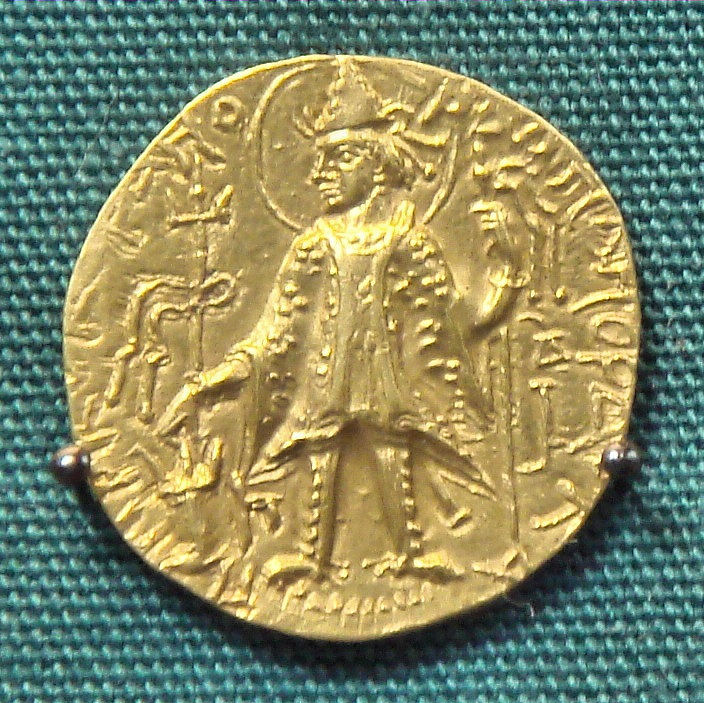
- Coin with a depiction of Kanishka II.
- Reign: 232-247 CE
- Predecessor: Vasudeva I
- Successor: Vasishka

Kanishka II (Brahmi: 𑀓𑀸𑀡𑀺𑀱𑁆𑀓; Kā-ṇi-ṣka) was one of the emperors of the Kushan Empire from around 232-247 CE. He succeeded Vasudeva I who is considered to be the last great Kushan emperor.

== Rule ==
While he upheld Kushan rule in northern India, it is likely that Kanishka II lost the western part of his empire, namely Bactria/Tokharistan to the Sasanian Shapur I (240-272 CE), whose conquests would be consolidated by the Kushano-Sassanians. In his inscriptions at Naqsh-e Rostam Shapur now claimed that he controlled the realm of the Kushans (Kūšān šahr) "up to Pašakibur (i.e. Purushapura)" (Peshawar), suggesting that he may have expanding even beyond the Hindu-Kush at the expense of the Kushans. The rock inscription at Rag-i-Bibi further support this view.

Several overstrikes by the Kushano-Sasanian Peroz I Kushanshah over coins of Kanishka II are known, and it is from the time of Peroz that the first Kushano-Sasanian coins were issued south of the Hindu-Kush.

Kanishka II recovered control of Gandhara at one point, as well as Kapiśa, and there are suggestions that following these successes he may have created a second Era of Kanishka in celebration of the hundredth anniversary of the original one.

== Coinage and dated statuary ==
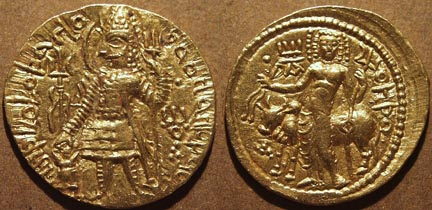
Coin of Kanishka II with Oesho.

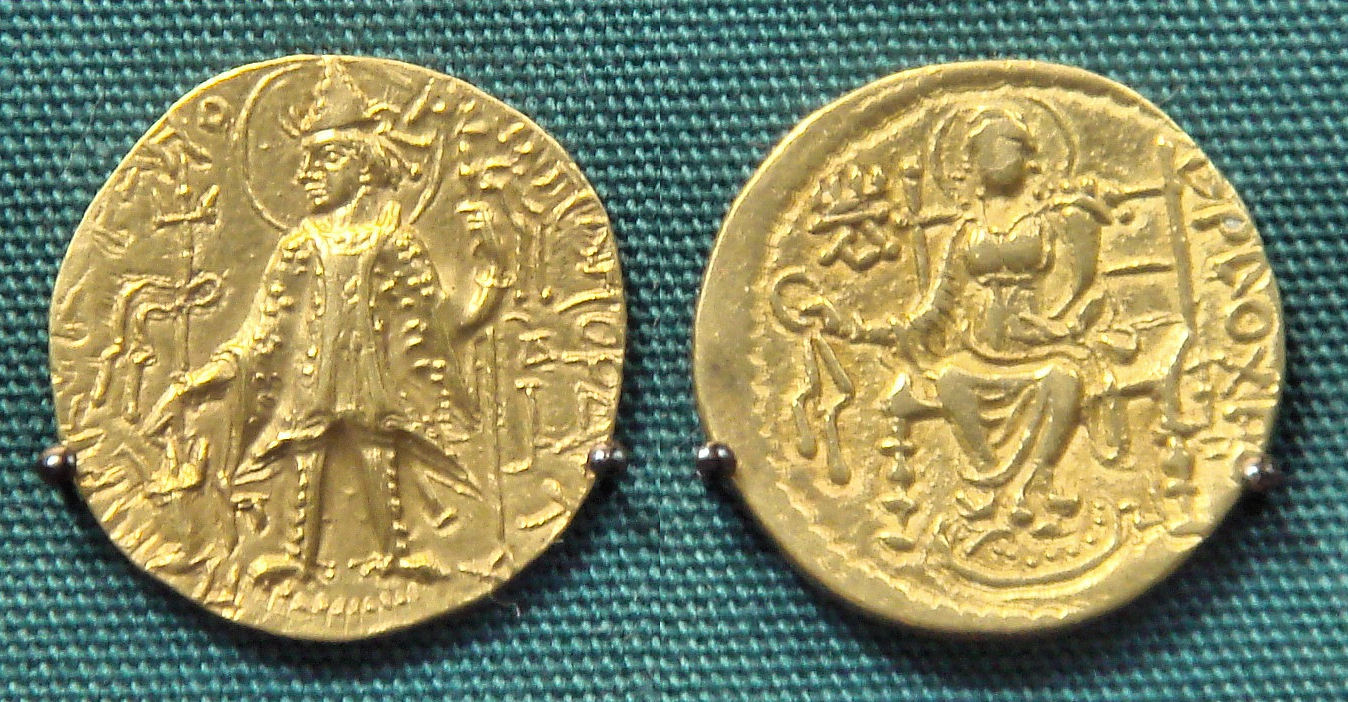
Kanishka II with Ardoksho.

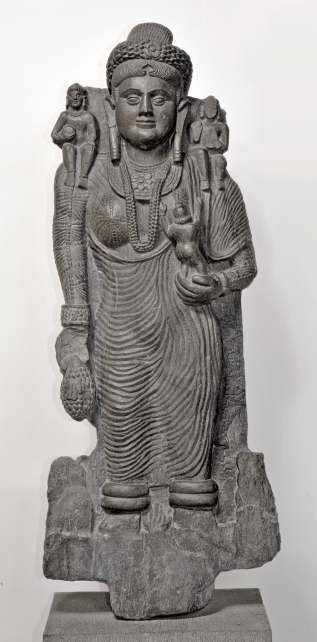
Statue of Hariti from Skarah Dheri, Gandhara, with the inscription "Year 399", probably in the Yavana era, hence 244 CE.

== Sources ==
- Cribb, Joe (2018). Problems of Chronology in Gandhāran Art: Proceedings of the First International Workshop of the Gandhāra Connections Project, University of Oxford, 23rd-24th March, 2017. University of Oxford The Classical Art Research Centre Archaeopress.

Preceded by Vasudeva I	Kushan Ruler	Succeeded by Vasishka

Territories/ dates	Western India	Western Pakistan Balochistan	Paropamisadae Arachosia	Bajaur	Gandhara	Western Punjab	Eastern Punjab	Mathura	Pataliputra
				INDO-SCYTHIAN KINGDOM			INDO-GREEK KINGDOM	INDO-SCYTHIAN Northern Satraps	
25 BCE – 10 CE				Indo-Scythian dynasty of the APRACHARAJAS; Vijayamitra (ruled 12 BCE – 15 CE) (Note: From the dated inscription on the Rukhana reliquary)	Liaka Kusulaka; Patika Kusulaka; Zeionises	Kharahostes (ruled 10 BCE– 10 CE); Mujatria	Strato II and Strato III	Hagana	
10-20CE		INDO-PARTHIAN KINGDOM; Gondophares		Indravasu	INDO-PARTHIAN KINGDOM; Gondophares		Rajuvula		
20–30 CE			Ubouzanes; Pakores	Vispavarma (ruled c. 0–20 CE)	Sarpedones		Bhadayasa	Sodasa	
30-40 CE			KUSHAN EMPIRE; Kujula Kadphises (c. 50–90)	Indravarma	Abdagases		...	...	
40–45 CE				Aspavarma	Gadana		...	...	
45–50 CE				Sasan	Sases		...	...	
50–75 CE							...	...	
75–100 CE	Indo-Scythian dynasty of the WESTERN SATRAPS; Chastana		Vima Takto (c. 90–113)				...	...	
100–120 CE	Abhiraka		Vima Kadphises (c. 113–127)						
120 CE	Bhumaka; Nahapana	PARATARAJAS; Yolamira	Kanishka I (c. 127–151)				Great Satrap Kharapallana and Satrap Vanaspara for Kanishka I		
130–230 CE	Jayadaman; Rudradaman I Damajadasri I Jivadaman; Rudrasimha I Isvaradatta; Rudrasimha I Jivadaman; Rudrasena I	Bagamira; Arjuna; Hvaramira; Mirahvara	Huvishka (c. 151 – c. 190); Vasudeva I (c. 190 – 230)						
230–250 CE	Samghadaman; Damasena; Damajadasri II; Viradaman; Yasodaman I Vijayasena; Damajadasri III; Rudrasena II; Visvasimha	Miratakhma; Kozana; Bhimarjuna; Koziya; Datarvharna; Datarvharna	KUSHANO-SASANIANS; Ardashir I (c. 230 – 250); Ardashir II (?-245)	Kanishka II (c. 230 – 247)					
250–280	Samghadaman; Damasena; Damajadasri II; Viradaman; Yasodaman I Vijayasena; Damajadasri III; Rudrasena II; Visvasimha	Miratakhma; Kozana; Bhimarjuna; Koziya; Datarvharna; Datarvharna	Peroz I, "Kushanshah" (c. 250 – 265); Hormizd I, "Kushanshah" (c. 265 – 295)			Vāsishka (c. 247 – 267); Kanishka III (c. 267 – 270)			
280–300	Bhratadarman	Datayola II	Hormizd II, "Kushanshah" (c. 295 – 300)			Vasudeva II (c. 267 – 300)		GUPTA EMPIRE; Chandragupta I Samudragupta; Chandragupta II	
300–320 CE	Visvasena; Rudrasimha II; Jivadaman		Peroz II, "Kushanshah" (c. 300 – 325)			Mahi (c. 300–305); Shaka (c. 305 – 335)		GUPTA EMPIRE; Chandragupta I Samudragupta; Chandragupta II	
320–388 CE	Yasodaman II; Rudradaman II; Rudrasena III; Simhasena; Rudrasena IV		Varahran I (325–350); Shapur II Sassanid king and "Kushanshah" (c. 350)			Kipunada (c. 335 – 350)		GUPTA EMPIRE; Chandragupta I Samudragupta; Chandragupta II	
388–396 CE	Rudrasimha III		KIDARITES invasion					GUPTA EMPIRE; Chandragupta I Samudragupta; Chandragupta II	
