= Kanishka III =

Kushan emperor from c. 265 to c. 270

Samrat Kanishka III
- Kushan emperor
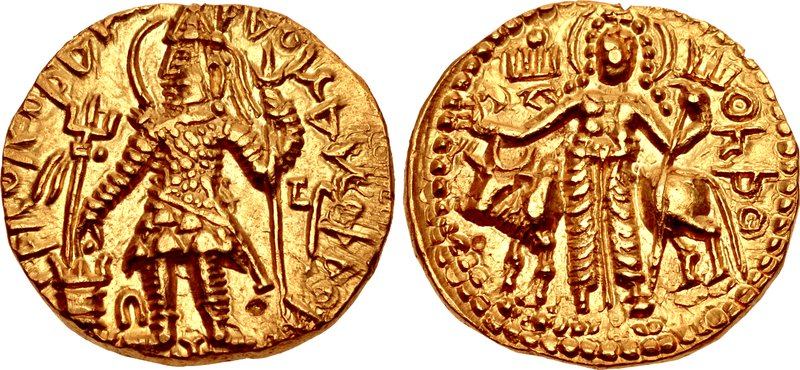
- Coin of Samrat Kanishka III. Circa AD 267–270. Main mint in Taxila. Obverse: King Kanishka standing holding a standard, sacrificing over an altar; trident to left. Greco-Bactrian legend around ϷΑΟΝΑΝΟϷΑΟ ΚΑΝΗϷΚΙ ΚΟϷΑΝΟ Shaonanoshao Kanishki Koshano "King of Kings, Kanishka the Kushan". ga in Brahmi to right of altar; gho in Brahmi between legs; hu in Brahmi to right of scepter. Reverse: Ithyphallic Oesho (Οηϸο), thought to be Shiva, standing facing, holding a garland or diadem and trident; behind, the bull Nandi standing left; to upper left, pellet above tamgha.
- Reign: c. 265 – 275 CE
- Coronation: 265 CE
- Predecessor: Vāsishka
- Successor: Vasudeva II
- Born: 214 CE
- Died: 278 CE
- Spouse: UNKNOWN
- Issue: Shaka
Names
- Kanishka III
- Dynasty: Kushan

Location of the Ara inscription of Samrat Kanishka III

Samrat Kanishka III (Greco-Bactrian: ΚΑΝΗϷΚΕ Kanēške; Kharosthi: 𐨐𐨞𐨁𐨮𐨿𐨐 Ka-ṇi-ṣka, Kaṇiṣka; Brahmi: Kā-ṇi-ṣka, Kāṇiṣka; Sanskrit: कनिष्क), was a Kushan emperor who reigned from around the year 265 CE to 270 CE. He is believed to have succeeded Vasishka and was succeeded by Vasudeva II. He ruled in areas of Northwestern India.

== Inscriptions ==
In an inscription dated to the "Year 41" (probably of the 2nd century of the Kanishka era) and discovered on the borders of the river Ara in Punjab, he qualifies himself as a Maharaja rajadhiraja Devaputra Kaisara Kanishka ("Great King, King of Kings, Son of God, Caesar, Kanishka), suggesting some awareness of the Roman Empire as Kaisara seems to stand for "Caesar", and names himself as the son of Vajheshka, identified as Kushan ruler Vashishka. The inscription is rather worn and the reading Kaisara has been doubted, especially since no other mentions of this title are known from Kushan sources.

Ara inscription of the Year 41

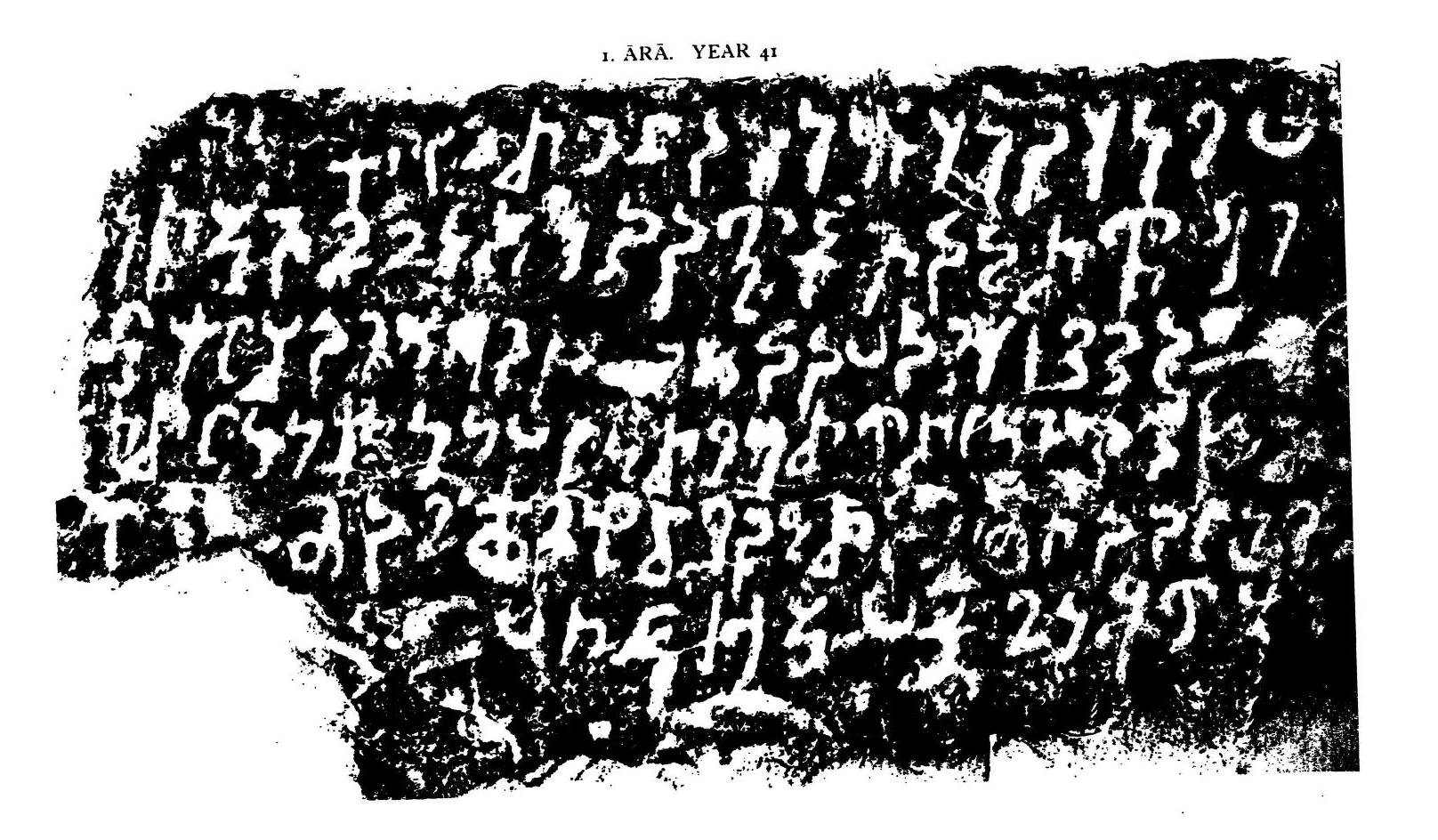
Rubbing of the inscription. The Kharosthi script reads right to left.

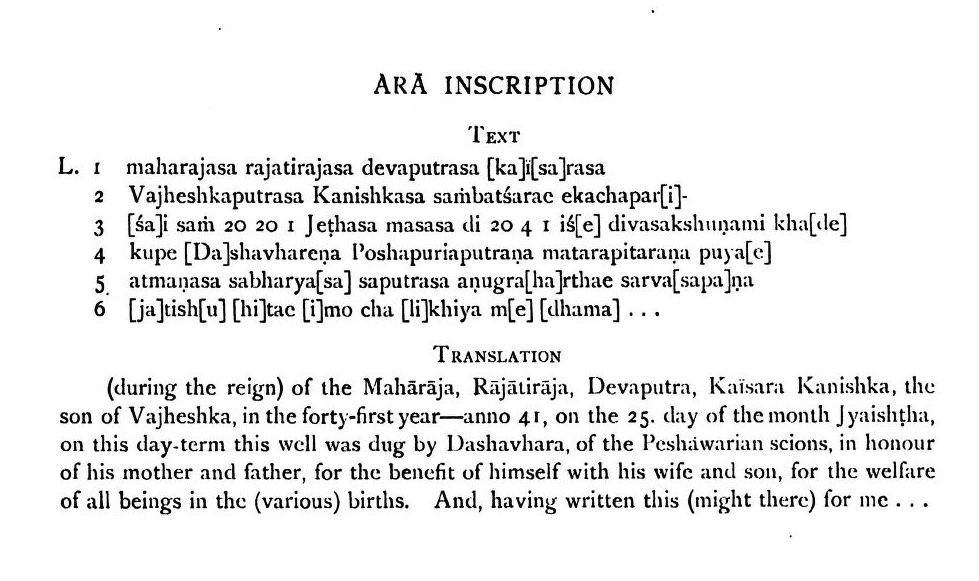
Transliteration and English translation.

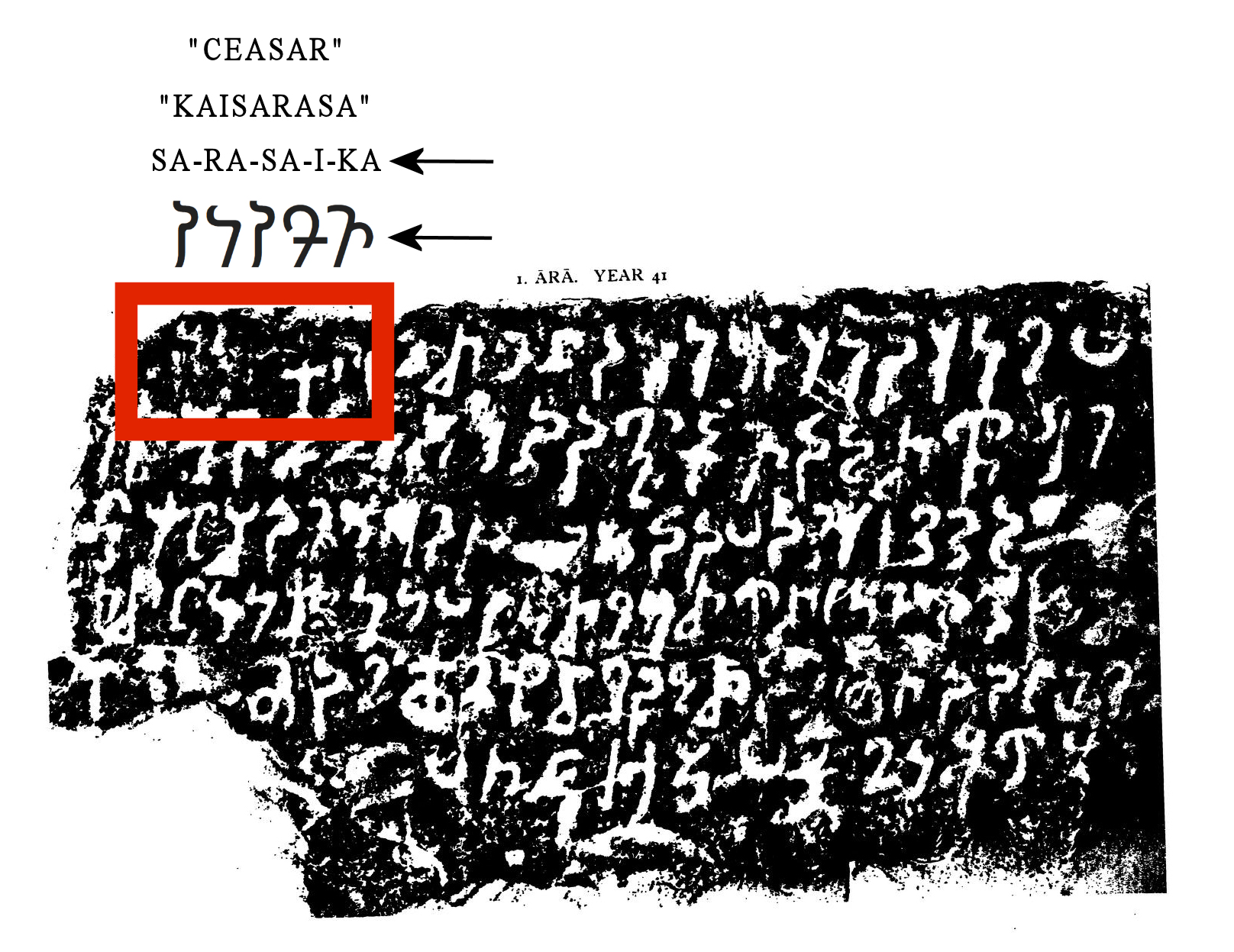
The very damaged "Caesar" portion, and its proposed reading

The Ara inscription of Kanishka III, in the Kharoshthi script, using the title Maharaja Rajatiraja Devaputra Kaisara Kanishka ("Great King, King of Kings, Son of God, Caesar, Kanishka)

== Coinage ==
It was initially thought that there were no definite coins known of him, as the "Kanishka" named in the coins was not differentiated. Only workmanship and graphical style in relation to other known rulers, tend to suggest attribution to this later Kanishka. However, this hypothesis was shaken by coin hoards being found in Tajikistan where coins of Kanishka III were found and identified in large numbers. All these finds north of the Oxus river seems to indicate that it was legal tender for a period of time.

== Notes ==
Preceded by Vasishka	Kushan Ruler	Succeeded by Vasudeva II

Territories/ dates	Western India	Western Pakistan Balochistan	Paropamisadae Arachosia	Bajaur	Gandhara	Western Punjab	Eastern Punjab	Mathura	Pataliputra
				INDO-SCYTHIAN KINGDOM			INDO-GREEK KINGDOM	INDO-SCYTHIAN Northern Satraps	
25 BCE – 10 CE				Indo-Scythian dynasty of the APRACHARAJAS; Vijayamitra (ruled 12 BCE – 15 CE) (Note: From the dated inscription on the Rukhana reliquary)	Liaka Kusulaka; Patika Kusulaka; Zeionises	Kharahostes (ruled 10 BCE– 10 CE); Mujatria	Strato II and Strato III	Hagana	
10-20CE		INDO-PARTHIAN KINGDOM; Gondophares		Indravasu	INDO-PARTHIAN KINGDOM; Gondophares		Rajuvula		
20–30 CE			Ubouzanes; Pakores	Vispavarma (ruled c. 0–20 CE)	Sarpedones		Bhadayasa	Sodasa	
30-40 CE			KUSHAN EMPIRE; Kujula Kadphises (c. 50–90)	Indravarma	Abdagases		...	...	
40–45 CE				Aspavarma	Gadana		...	...	
45–50 CE				Sasan	Sases		...	...	
50–75 CE							...	...	
75–100 CE	Indo-Scythian dynasty of the WESTERN SATRAPS; Chastana		Vima Takto (c. 90–113)				...	...	
100–120 CE	Abhiraka		Vima Kadphises (c. 113–127)						
120 CE	Bhumaka; Nahapana	PARATARAJAS; Yolamira	Kanishka I (c. 127–151)				Great Satrap Kharapallana and Satrap Vanaspara for Kanishka I		
130–230 CE	Jayadaman; Rudradaman I Damajadasri I Jivadaman; Rudrasimha I Isvaradatta; Rudrasimha I Jivadaman; Rudrasena I	Bagamira; Arjuna; Hvaramira; Mirahvara	Huvishka (c. 151 – c. 190); Vasudeva I (c. 190 – 230)						
230–250 CE	Samghadaman; Damasena; Damajadasri II; Viradaman; Yasodaman I Vijayasena; Damajadasri III; Rudrasena II; Visvasimha	Miratakhma; Kozana; Bhimarjuna; Koziya; Datarvharna; Datarvharna	KUSHANO-SASANIANS; Ardashir I (c. 230 – 250); Ardashir II (?-245)	Kanishka II (c. 230 – 247)					
250–280	Samghadaman; Damasena; Damajadasri II; Viradaman; Yasodaman I Vijayasena; Damajadasri III; Rudrasena II; Visvasimha	Miratakhma; Kozana; Bhimarjuna; Koziya; Datarvharna; Datarvharna	Peroz I, "Kushanshah" (c. 250 – 265); Hormizd I, "Kushanshah" (c. 265 – 295)			Vāsishka (c. 247 – 267); Kanishka III (c. 267 – 270)			
280–300	Bhratadarman	Datayola II	Hormizd II, "Kushanshah" (c. 295 – 300)			Vasudeva II (c. 267 – 300)		GUPTA EMPIRE; Chandragupta I Samudragupta; Chandragupta II	
300–320 CE	Visvasena; Rudrasimha II; Jivadaman		Peroz II, "Kushanshah" (c. 300 – 325)			Mahi (c. 300–305); Shaka (c. 305 – 335)		GUPTA EMPIRE; Chandragupta I Samudragupta; Chandragupta II	
320–388 CE	Yasodaman II; Rudradaman II; Rudrasena III; Simhasena; Rudrasena IV		Varahran I (325–350); Shapur II Sassanid king and "Kushanshah" (c. 350)			Kipunada (c. 335 – 350)		GUPTA EMPIRE; Chandragupta I Samudragupta; Chandragupta II	
388–396 CE	Rudrasimha III		KIDARITES invasion					GUPTA EMPIRE; Chandragupta I Samudragupta; Chandragupta II	
