= Vasudeva II =

Kushan emperor from c. 275 to 300

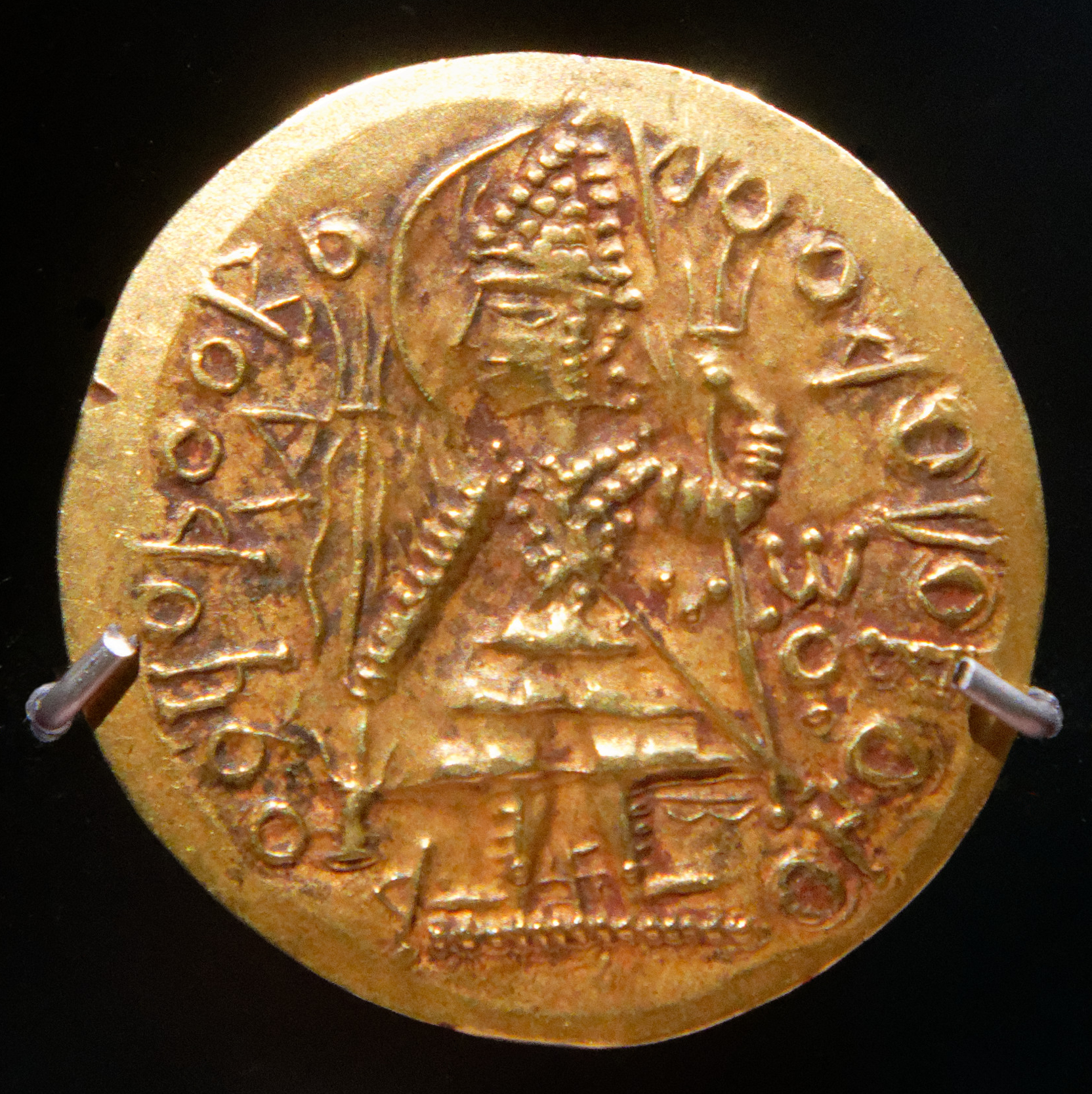
- Coin Vasudeva II, Guimet Museum, MA24360.

Kushan emperor
- Reign: c. 275–300
- Predecessor: Kanishka III
- Successor: Shaka
- Dynasty: Kushan
- Religion: Hinduism

Vasudeva II (Middle Brahmi script: Bā-zo-de-o Sanskritzied to "Vasudeva") was a Kushan emperor who ruled c. 275–300. He was probably the successor of Kanishka III and may have been succeeded by an emperor named Shaka Kushan.

Vasudeva II probably only was a local ruler in the area of Taxila, in western Punjab, under the suzerainty of the Gupta Empire.

Vasudeva II was a contemporary of Hormizd I Kushanshah of the Kushano-Sasanians, as he is known to have overstruck a large quantity of the early copper coins of Hormizd I issued south of the Hindu-Kush.

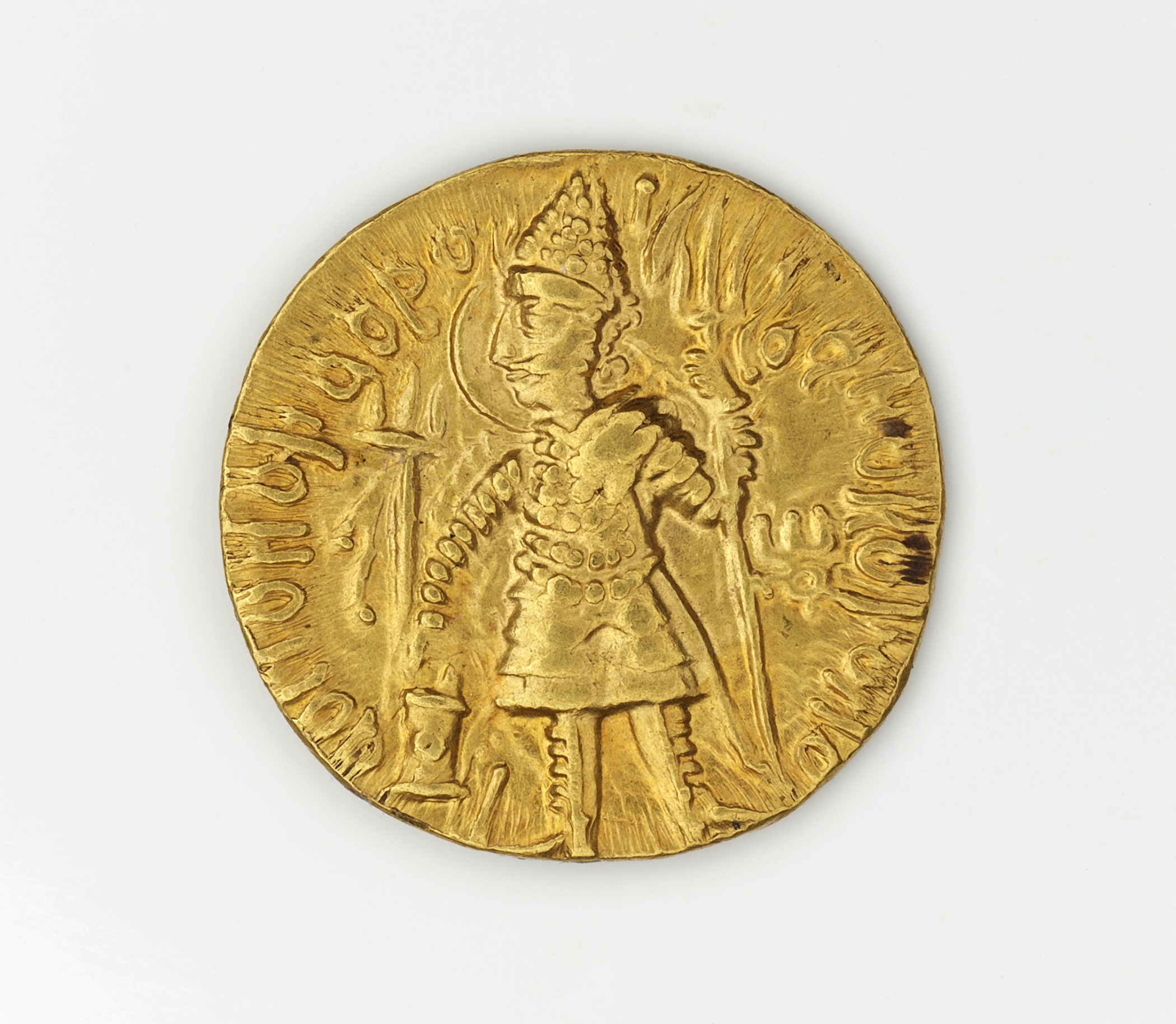
Dinar of Vasudeva II.

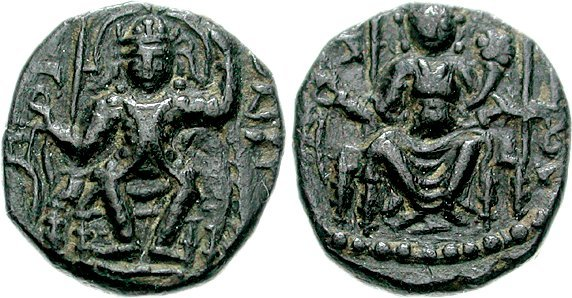
A bronze coin of Vasudeva II enthroned. Circa 290–310

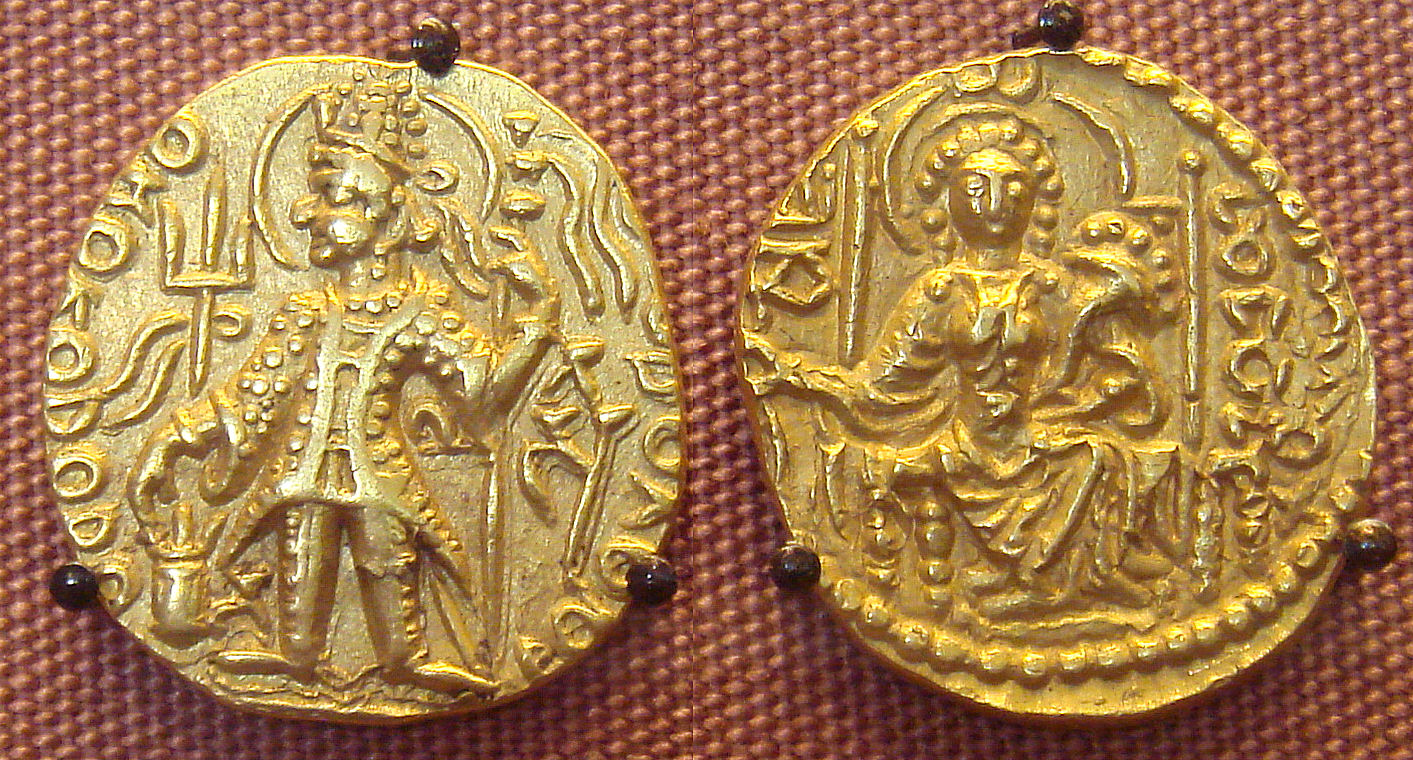
Coin of Vasudeva II. The name of the ruler appears vertically next to his left arm in Gupta script: Vā-su.

== Sources ==
- Cribb, Joe (2018). Problems of Chronology in Gandhāran Art: Proceedings of the First International Workshop of the Gandhāra Connections Project, University of Oxford, 23rd-24th March, 2017. University of Oxford The Classical Art Research Centre Archaeopress.

Preceded by Kanishka III	Kushan Ruler c. 275–300 AD	Succeeded by Shaka Kushan

Territories/ dates	Western India	Western Pakistan Balochistan	Paropamisadae Arachosia	Bajaur	Gandhara	Western Punjab	Eastern Punjab	Mathura	Pataliputra
				INDO-SCYTHIAN KINGDOM			INDO-GREEK KINGDOM	INDO-SCYTHIAN Northern Satraps	
25 BCE – 10 CE				Indo-Scythian dynasty of the APRACHARAJAS; Vijayamitra (ruled 12 BCE – 15 CE) (Note: From the dated inscription on the Rukhana reliquary)	Liaka Kusulaka; Patika Kusulaka; Zeionises	Kharahostes (ruled 10 BCE– 10 CE); Mujatria	Strato II and Strato III	Hagana	
10-20CE		INDO-PARTHIAN KINGDOM; Gondophares		Indravasu	INDO-PARTHIAN KINGDOM; Gondophares		Rajuvula		
20–30 CE			Ubouzanes; Pakores	Vispavarma (ruled c. 0–20 CE)	Sarpedones		Bhadayasa	Sodasa	
30-40 CE			KUSHAN EMPIRE; Kujula Kadphises (c. 50–90)	Indravarma	Abdagases		...	...	
40–45 CE				Aspavarma	Gadana		...	...	
45–50 CE				Sasan	Sases		...	...	
50–75 CE							...	...	
75–100 CE	Indo-Scythian dynasty of the WESTERN SATRAPS; Chastana		Vima Takto (c. 90–113)				...	...	
100–120 CE	Abhiraka		Vima Kadphises (c. 113–127)						
120 CE	Bhumaka; Nahapana	PARATARAJAS; Yolamira	Kanishka I (c. 127–151)				Great Satrap Kharapallana and Satrap Vanaspara for Kanishka I		
130–230 CE	Jayadaman; Rudradaman I Damajadasri I Jivadaman; Rudrasimha I Isvaradatta; Rudrasimha I Jivadaman; Rudrasena I	Bagamira; Arjuna; Hvaramira; Mirahvara	Huvishka (c. 151 – c. 190); Vasudeva I (c. 190 – 230)						
230–250 CE	Samghadaman; Damasena; Damajadasri II; Viradaman; Yasodaman I Vijayasena; Damajadasri III; Rudrasena II; Visvasimha	Miratakhma; Kozana; Bhimarjuna; Koziya; Datarvharna; Datarvharna	KUSHANO-SASANIANS; Ardashir I (c. 230 – 250); Ardashir II (?-245)	Kanishka II (c. 230 – 247)					
250–280	Samghadaman; Damasena; Damajadasri II; Viradaman; Yasodaman I Vijayasena; Damajadasri III; Rudrasena II; Visvasimha	Miratakhma; Kozana; Bhimarjuna; Koziya; Datarvharna; Datarvharna	Peroz I, "Kushanshah" (c. 250 – 265); Hormizd I, "Kushanshah" (c. 265 – 295)			Vāsishka (c. 247 – 267); Kanishka III (c. 267 – 270)			
280–300	Bhratadarman	Datayola II	Hormizd II, "Kushanshah" (c. 295 – 300)			Vasudeva II (c. 267 – 300)		GUPTA EMPIRE; Chandragupta I Samudragupta; Chandragupta II	
300–320 CE	Visvasena; Rudrasimha II; Jivadaman		Peroz II, "Kushanshah" (c. 300 – 325)			Mahi (c. 300–305); Shaka (c. 305 – 335)		GUPTA EMPIRE; Chandragupta I Samudragupta; Chandragupta II	
320–388 CE	Yasodaman II; Rudradaman II; Rudrasena III; Simhasena; Rudrasena IV		Varahran I (325–350); Shapur II Sassanid king and "Kushanshah" (c. 350)			Kipunada (c. 335 – 350)		GUPTA EMPIRE; Chandragupta I Samudragupta; Chandragupta II	
388–396 CE	Rudrasimha III		KIDARITES invasion					GUPTA EMPIRE; Chandragupta I Samudragupta; Chandragupta II	
