= Buddhism in Afghanistan =

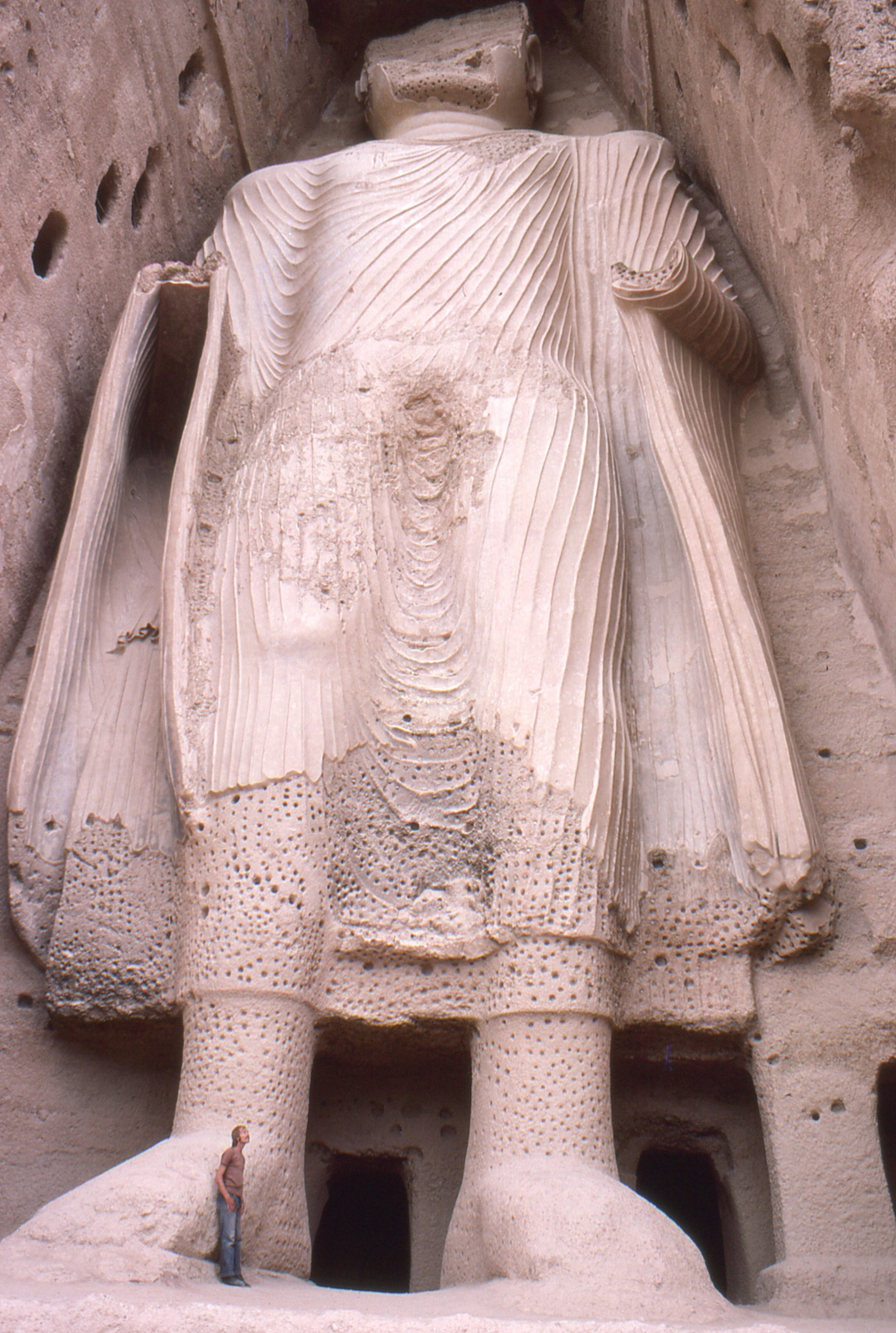
One of the Buddhas of Bamiyan (destroyed by the Taliban in 2001) photographed at its base in August 1977

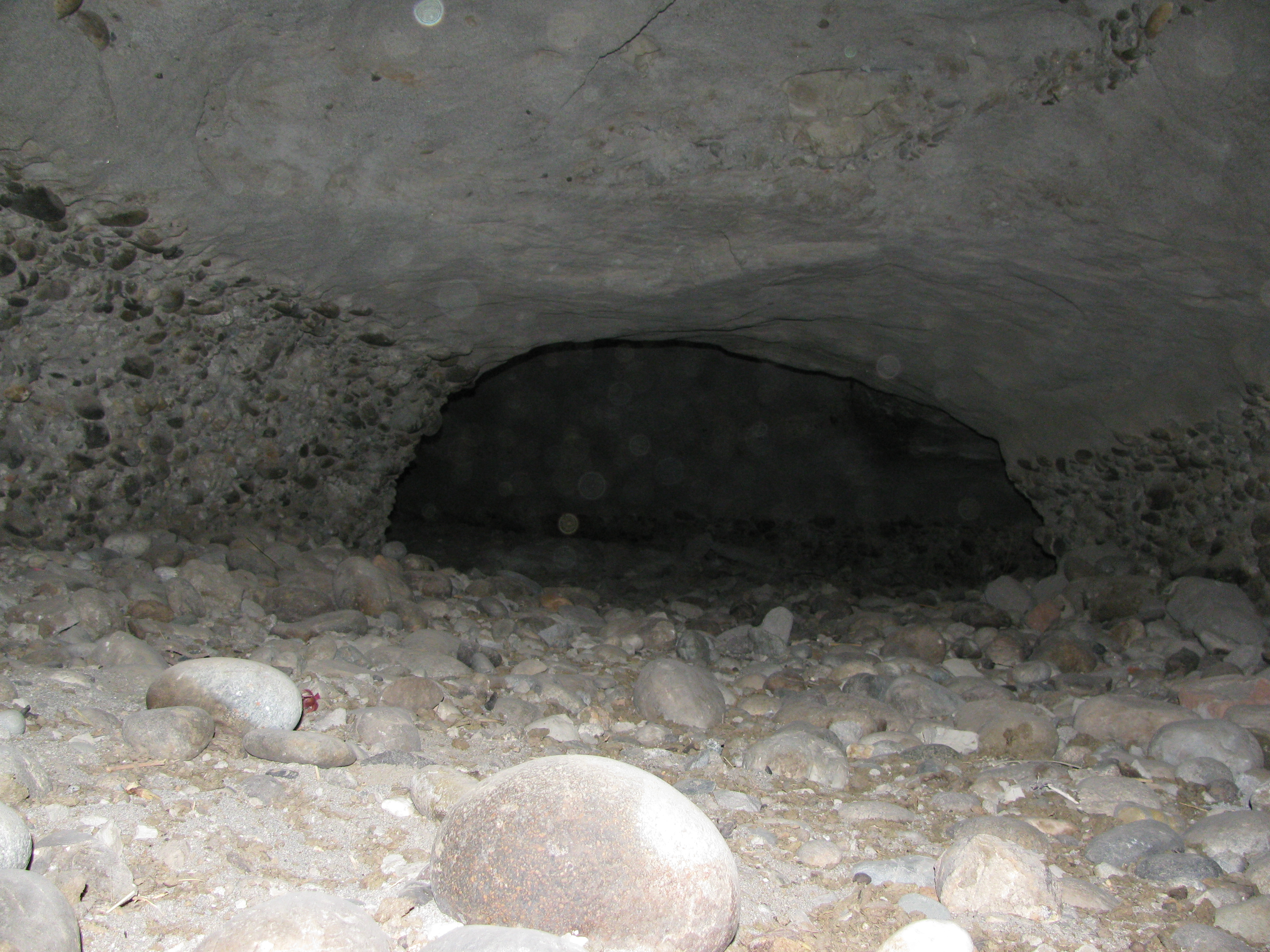
Ancient Buddhist cave in Jalalabad, 2009

Buddhism, a religion founded by Gautama Buddha, first arrived in modern-day Afghanistan through the conquests of Ashoka (r. 268–232 BCE), the third emperor of the Maurya Empire. Among the earliest notable sites of Buddhist influence in the country is a bilingual mountainside inscription in Greek and Aramaic that dates back to 260 BCE and was found on the rocky outcrop of Chil Zena near Kandahar.

Many prominent Buddhist monks were based in Afghanistan during this period: Menander I (r. 165–130 BCE), a Greco-Bactrian king, was a renowned patron of Buddhism and is immortalized in the Milinda Panha, a Pali-language Buddhist text; Mahadharmaraksita, a 2nd-century BCE Indo-Greek monk, is said to have led 30,000 Buddhist monks from "Alasandra, the city of the Yonas" (a colony of Alexander the Great, located approximately 150 kilometres or 93 miles to the north of modern-day Kabul) to Sri Lanka for the dedication of the Mahathupa in Anuradhapura, according to the Mahavamsa (Chap. XXIX); Lokaksema, a 2nd-century Kushan monk, travelled to the Chinese capital city of Luoyang during the reign of the Han dynasty, and was the first translator of Mahayana Buddhist scriptures into the Chinese language.

The Nava Vihara monasteries, located near the ancient city of Balkh in northern Afghanistan, functioned as the centre of Buddhist activity in Central Asia for centuries.

The Buddhist religion survived the Islamic conquest of Afghanistan by the Umayyads and successive rule by the Abbasid Caliphate and regional Islamic polities. Buddhism in Afghanistan was effectively destroyed in the 13th century by Mongol armies during the Mongol conquests. Foreign Buddhists were known to have had a presence in the Mongol Ilkhanate and Chagatai Khanate, which controlled parts of the region. The disintegration of these states in the 14th century also signaled the last mentions of Buddhism in Afghanistan.

== History ==
The territory within the modern borders of Afghanistan has seen many cultural and religious shifts over the centuries. The geographical position of the area between the Middle East, South Asian, and Central Asian cultures, and the proximity to the famous Silk Road (connecting East Asian and Mediterranean civilizations, and others in between), have been major drivers of local historical and cultural developments. One major influence was the conquest of the area by Alexander the Great, which incorporated the area for a time into the Hellenistic World, and resulted in a strong Hellenistic influence on Buddhist religious art in that region. In 305 BC, the Seleucid Empire made an alliance with the Indian Maurya Empire. The Mauryans brought Buddhism from India subcontinent and controlled the area south of the Hindu Kush until about 185 BC when they were overthrown.

Alexander took these away from the Aryans and established settlements of his own, but Seleucus Nicator gave them to Sandrocottus (Chandragupta), upon terms of intermarriage and of receiving in exchange 500 elephants.

— Strabo, 64 BC – 24 AD

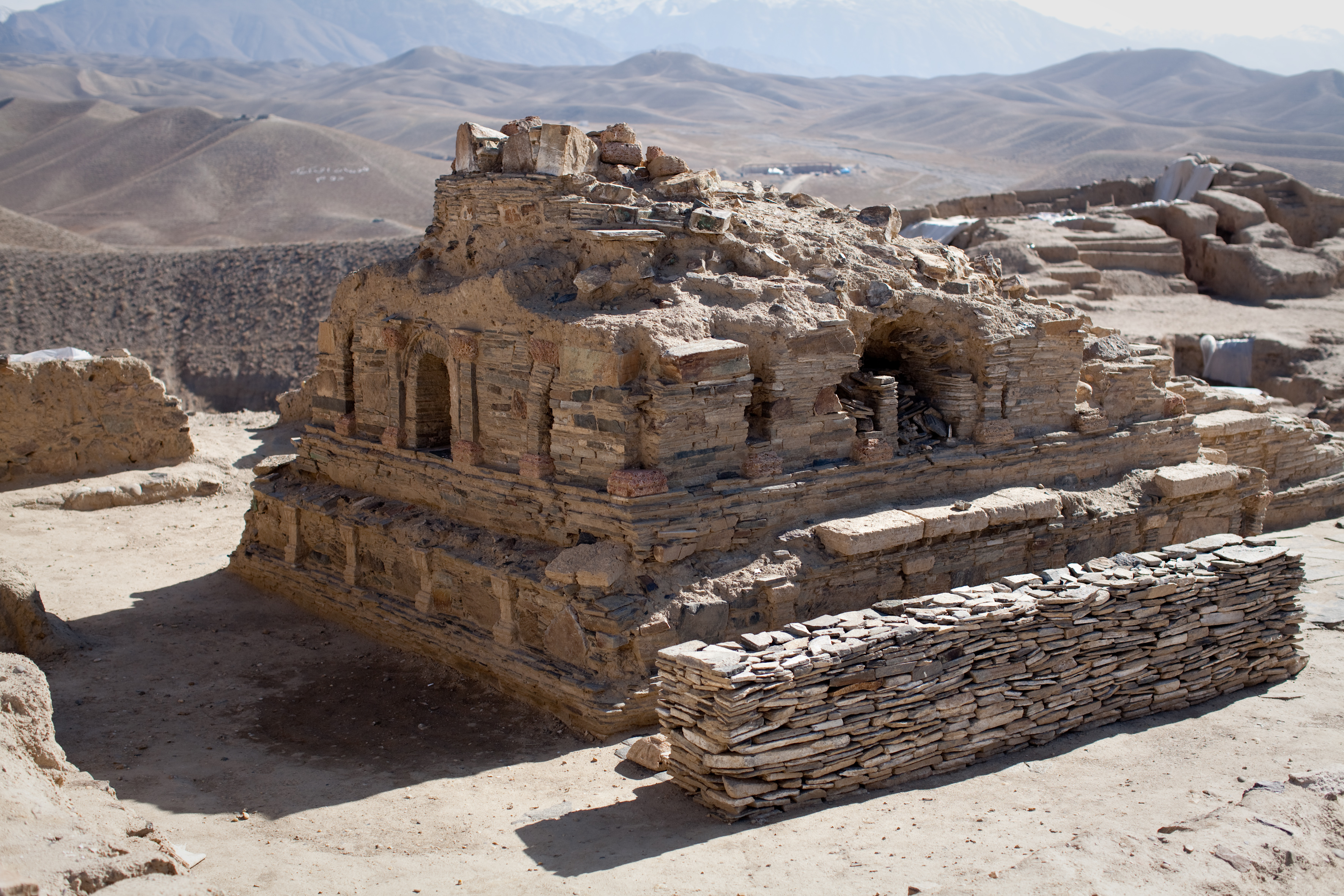
Mes Aynak Buddhist stupa, 2011

At the time of these developments, most of the area belonged to the kingdoms of Bactria and Sogdiana, including the Scythians, followed Buddhism until the arrival of Islam.

After the Mauryan Empire, Buddhism also flourished under the Kushan Empire, when a tribe called the Yuezhi conquered Bactria and entered the region of modern day Afghanistan.

The Sassanian Empire controlled much of Afghanistan and the influence of Zoroastrianism, the state religion of the empire, increased in western parts of the area and led to the decline of Buddhism there. However, Buddhism remained extant in eastern Afghanistan.

Soon after the Sassanian dynasty fell to the Muslims (in 651 AD), the Nava Vihara monastery in Balkh came under Muslim rule (in 663 AD), but the monastery continued to function for at least another century. In 715 AD, after an insurrection in Balkh was crushed by the Abbasid Caliphate, many Persian Buddhist monks fled east along the Silk Road to the Buddhist Kingdom of Khotan, which spoke a related Eastern Iranian language, and onward into Tang China. Nava Vihara's hereditary administrators, the Persian Barmakids, converted from Buddhism to Islam after the monastery's conquest and became powerful viziers under the Abbasid caliphs of Baghdad. The last of the family's line of viziers, Ja'far ibn Yahya, is a protagonist in many tales from the Arabian Nights. In folktales and popular culture, Ja'far has been associated with a knowledge of mysticism, sorcery, and traditions lying outside the realm of Islam.

During the early Islamic period, Buddhists were given dhimmi status and allowed to practice their religion and permission was granted to restore Buddhist temples. Local Buddhist rulers and elites were retained to govern specific parts of the area. While these policies were eventually weakened or eliminated later on, Buddhism continued to exist for several centuries, with several 11th century accounts indicating a Buddhist presence in the area. According to historian Johan Elverskog, Muslim rulers in Central Asia (including Afghanistan) "largely allowed the Buddhists to continue with their religious observances." Cultural exchanges including literature, art and science were significant during this period of interaction between Buddhists and the new Muslim powers.

From the 9th century onwards, Buddhism was considered a tolerated religion among the several succeeding Islamic powers that controlled the region, with Buddhist monasteries and iconography possibly still being extant by the early 13th century. Conversions to Islam rose as time passed, with most of the population being Muslim by the early 11th century. Buddhism went into decline during this period, with Muslim and external sources increasingly speaking less about the religion or its adherents. Whatever was left of Buddhism was decimated during the Mongol invasions. In the aftermath of the conquests, the emergence of successor states like the Chagatai Khanate and the IIkhanate signaled a brief return of Buddhism in the region. Rulers would often invite Tibetan Buddhist monks to their royal courts and built Buddhist temples. After the breakup of the Khanates and the decisive conversion of its rulers to Islam in the 14th century, there is no further mention of Buddhism in the area.

== Archaeological finds ==
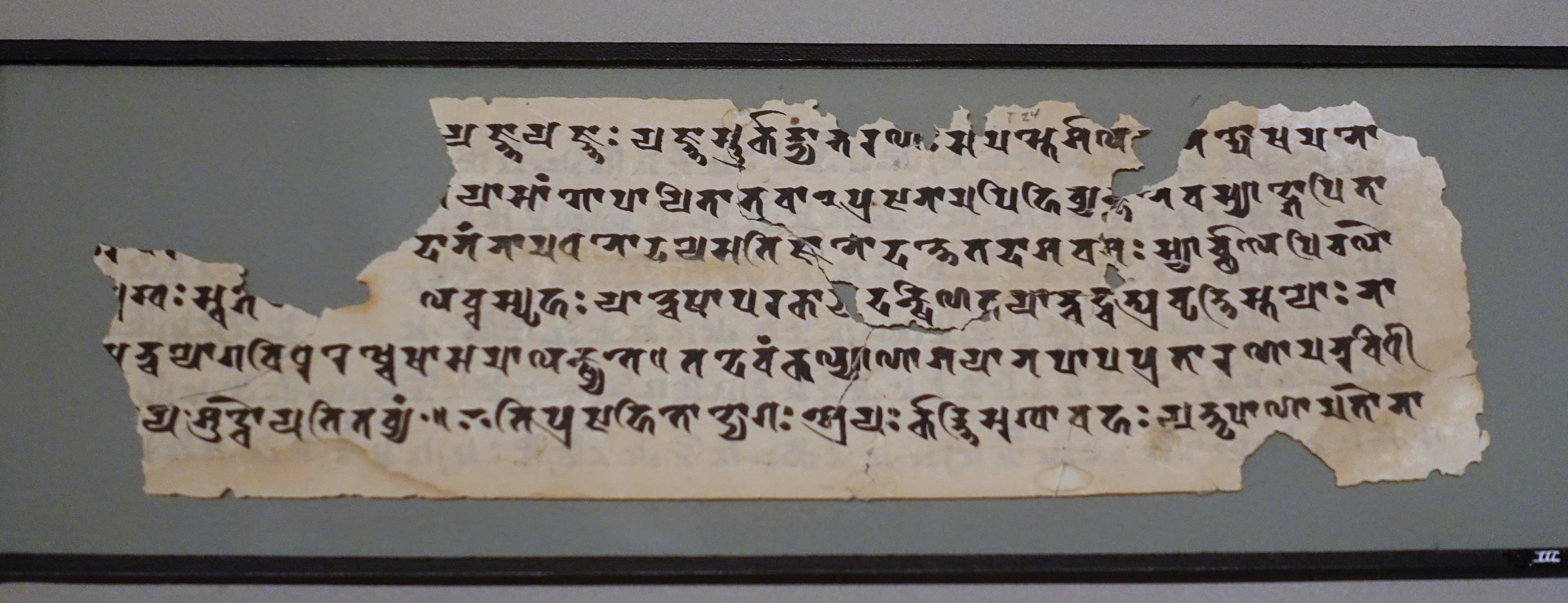
Manuscript fragment of the Buddhist Jatakamala, written in the Sanskrit language in the Gilgit–Bamiyan Type-II Protosarada script (Toyuk); dated to c. 8th century CE, Ethnological Museum of Berlin

=== Bamiyan monastery library ===
One of the early Buddhist schools, the Mahāsāṃghika-Lokottaravāda, were known to be prominent in the area of Bamiyan. The Chinese Buddhist monk Xuanzang visited a Lokottaravāda monastery in the 7th century CE, at Bamiyan, Afghanistan, and this monastery site has since been rediscovered by archaeologists. Birchbark and palm leaf manuscripts of texts in this monastery's collection, including Mahāyāna sūtras, have been discovered at the site, and these are now located in the Schøyen Collection. Some manuscripts are in the Gāndhārī language and Kharoṣṭhī script, while others are in Sanskrit and written in forms of the Gupta script. Manuscripts and fragments that have survived from this monastery's collection include the following source texts:

- Pratimokṣa Vibhaṅga of the Mahāsāṃghika-Lokottaravāda (MS 2382/269)
- Mahāparinirvāṇa Sūtra, a sūtra from the Āgamas (MS 2179/44)
- Caṃgī Sūtra, a sūtra from the Āgamas (MS 2376)
- Vajracchedikā Prajñāpāramitā Sūtra, a Mahāyāna sūtra (MS 2385)
- Bhaiṣajyaguru Sūtra, a Mahāyāna sūtra (MS 2385)
- Śrīmālādevī Siṃhanāda Sūtra, a Mahāyāna sūtra (MS 2378)
- Pravāraṇa Sūtra, a Mahāyāna sūtra (MS 2378)
- Sarvadharmapravṛttinirdeśa Sūtra, a Mahāyāna sūtra (MS 2378)
- Ajātaśatrukaukṛtyavinodana Sūtra, a Mahāyāna sūtra (MS 2378)
- Śāriputrābhidharma Śāstra (MS 2375/08)

=== Buddhist relics ===
In August 2010, it was reported that approximately 42 Buddhist relics have been discovered in Mes Aynak of the Logar Province in Afghanistan, which is south of Kabul. Some of these items date back to the 2nd century according to Archaeologists. Some Buddhist sites were found in Ghazni. The items in Logar include two Buddhist temples (Stupas), Buddha statues, frescos, silver and gold coins and precious beads.

There is a temple, stupas, beautiful rooms, big and small statues, two with the length of seven and nine meters, colorful frescos ornamented with gold and some coins... Some of the relics date back to the fifth century (AD)... We have come across signs that there are items maybe going back to the era before Christ or prehistory... We need foreign assistance to preserve these and their expertise to help us with further excavations.

— Mohammad Nader Rasouli, Afghan Archaeological Department

== Buddhist sites ==
- Tepe Narenj
- Bamiyan
- Haḍḍa
- Tapa Sardar
- Tapa Shotor
- Takht-i-Rustam
- Mes aynak
- Chakhil-i-Ghoundi Stupa
- Tepe Kafiriyat

== Buddhist historical figures from Afghanistan ==
- Prajñā, 9th-century Buddhist monk from what is now Kabul
- Barmakid family, hereditary monks of the Nava Vihara monastery close to Balkh prior to their conversion to Islam
- Buddhabhadra, 5th century monk and translator born in Nagarahāra (modern-day Jalalabad)

== Gallery ==
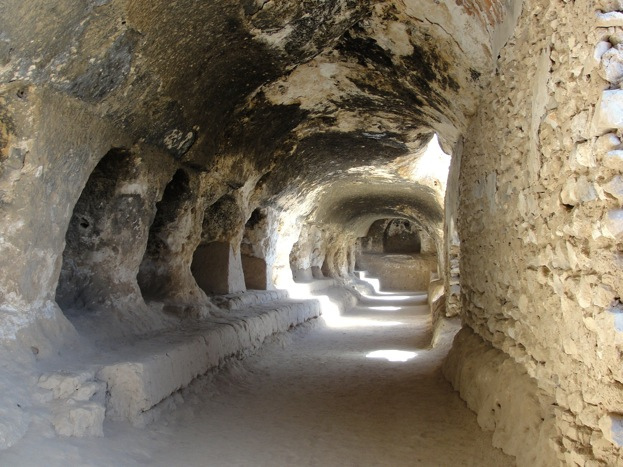
Cave system, stupa and monastery at Samangan, Takht-i-rustam

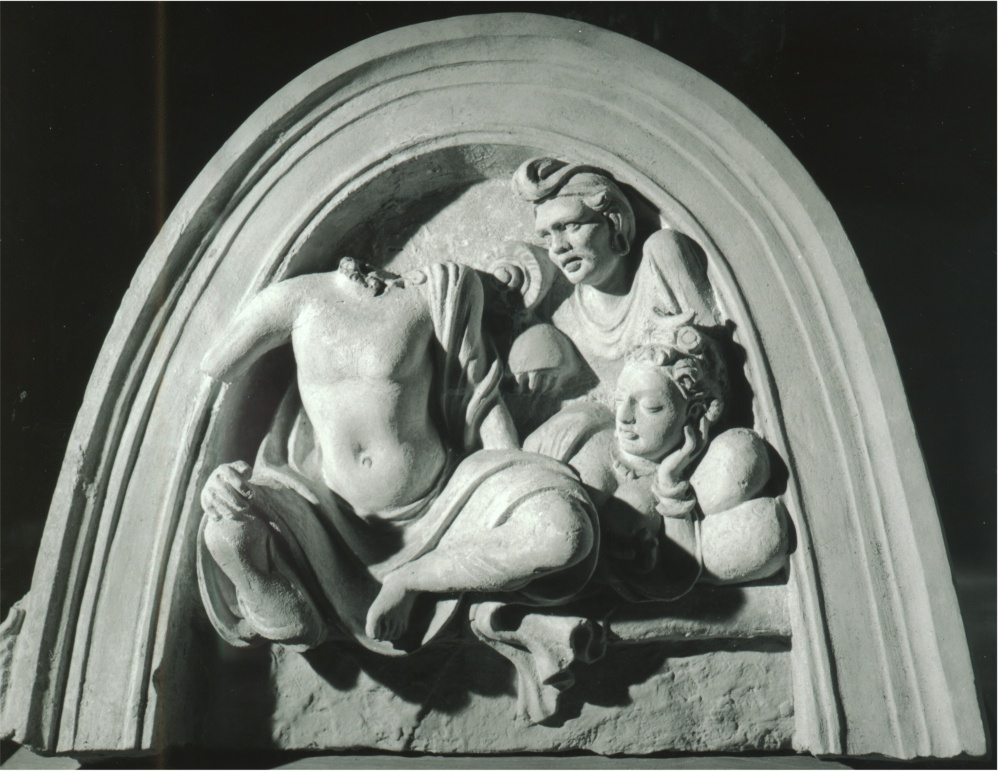
The Bodhisattva and Chandeka, Hadda, 5th century CE

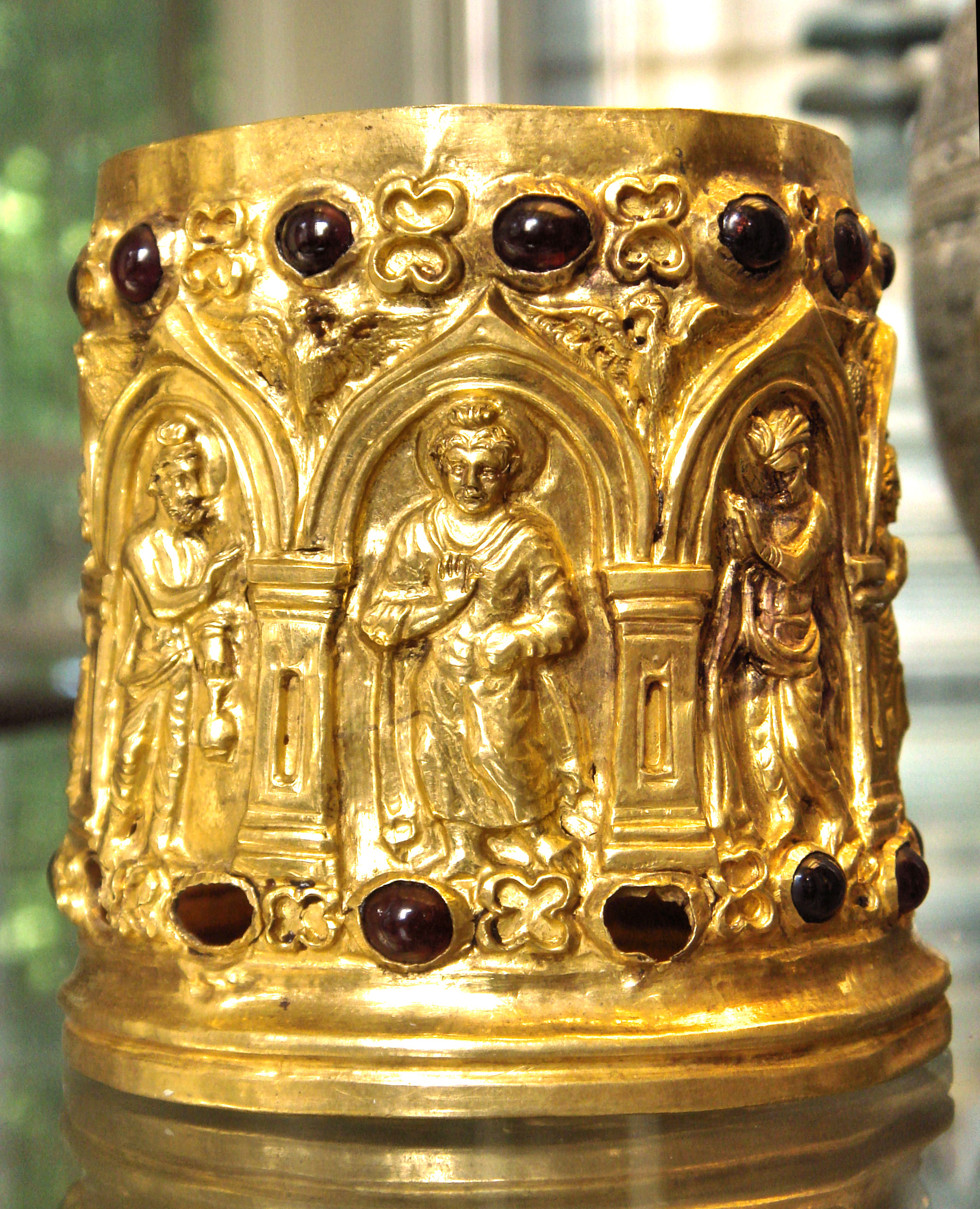
Bimaran Casket

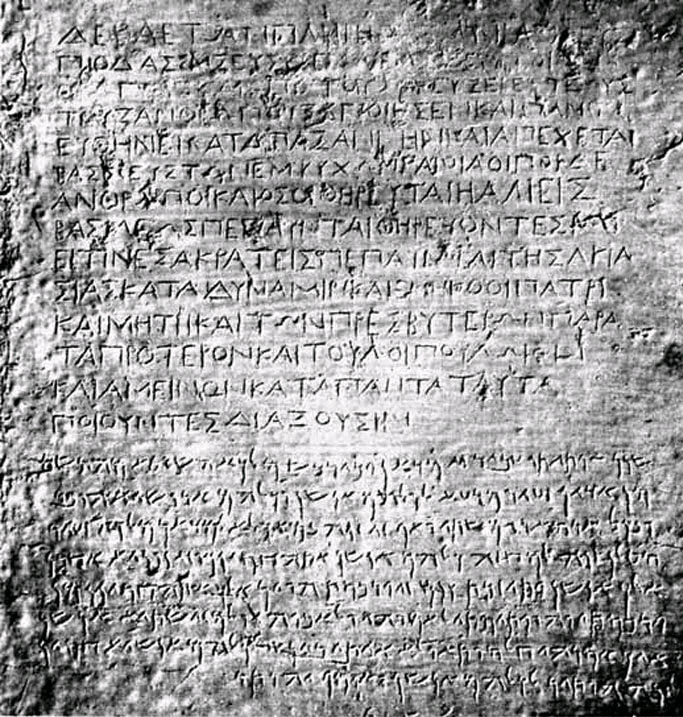
King Ashoka's Kandahar edict

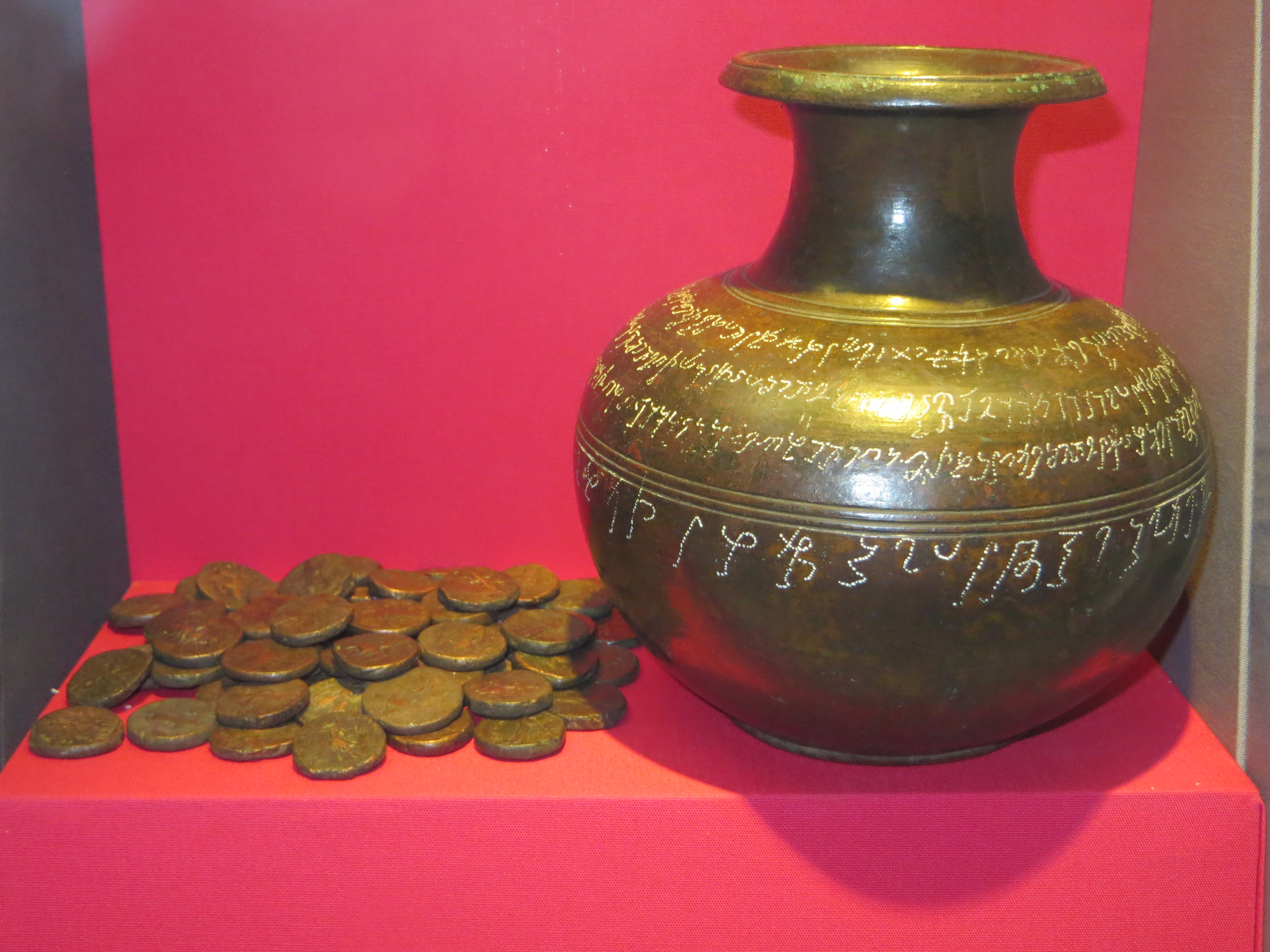
Wardak Vase in British Museum

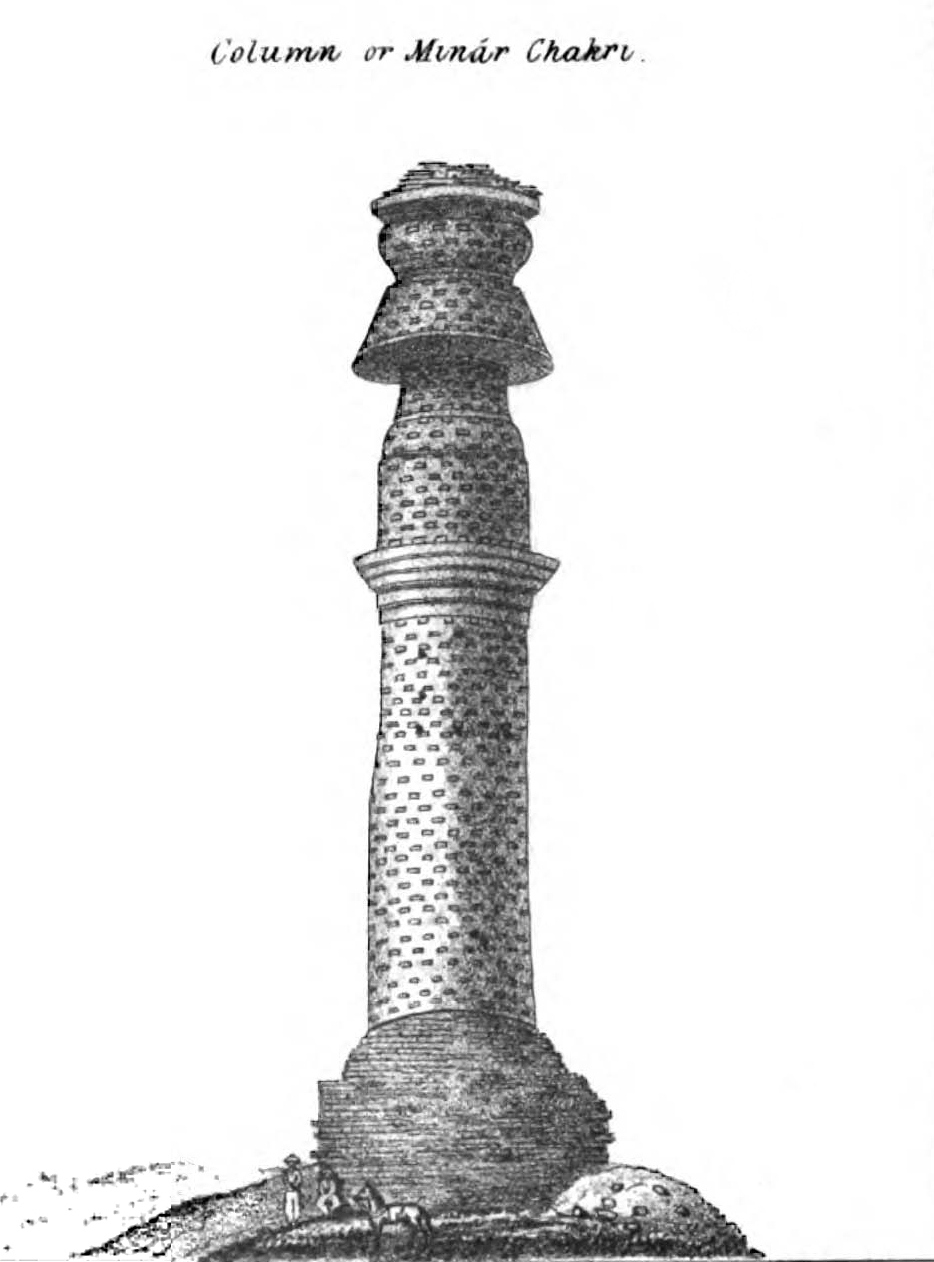
Minar-i-Chakri

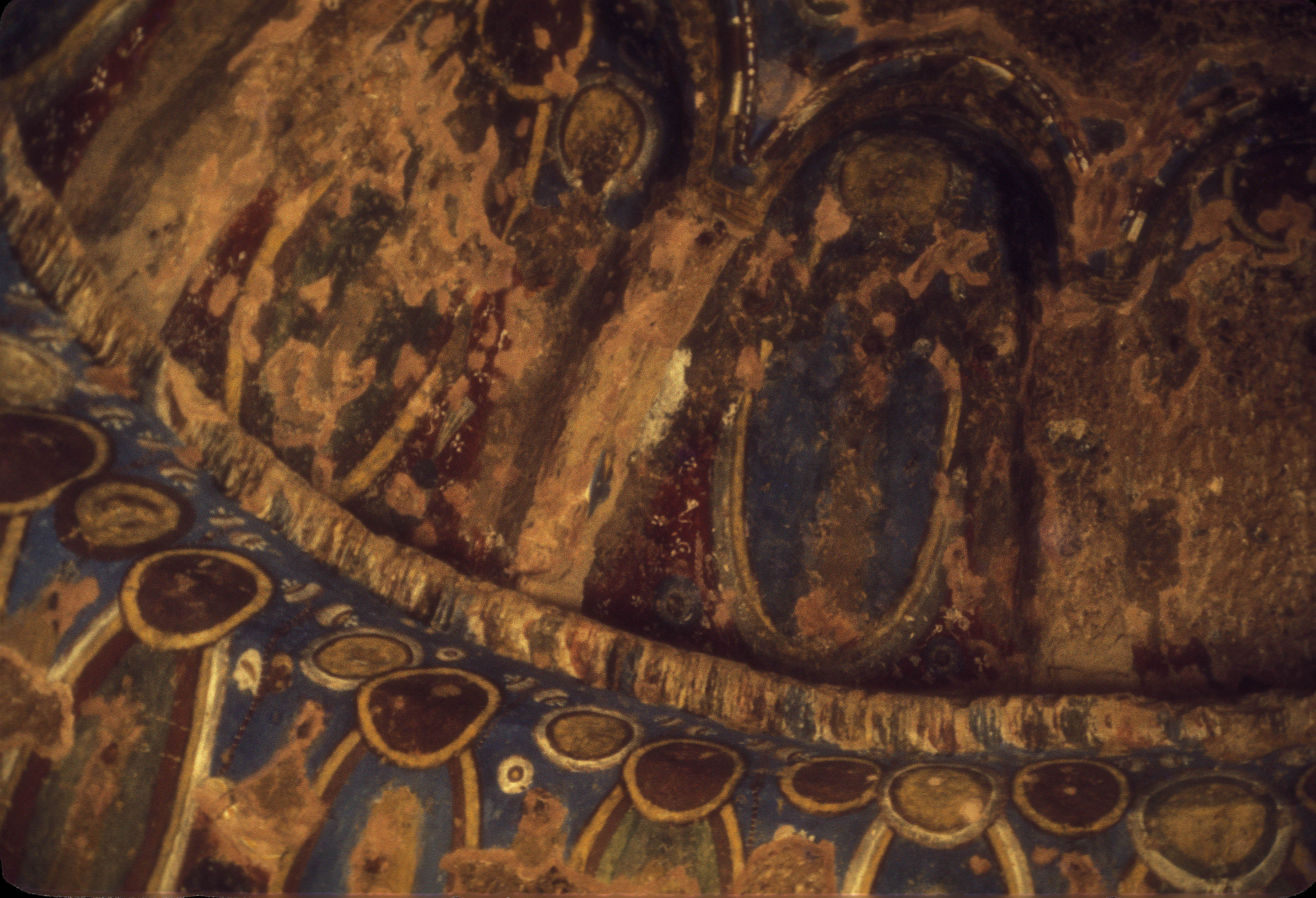
Bamiyan Grotto paintings

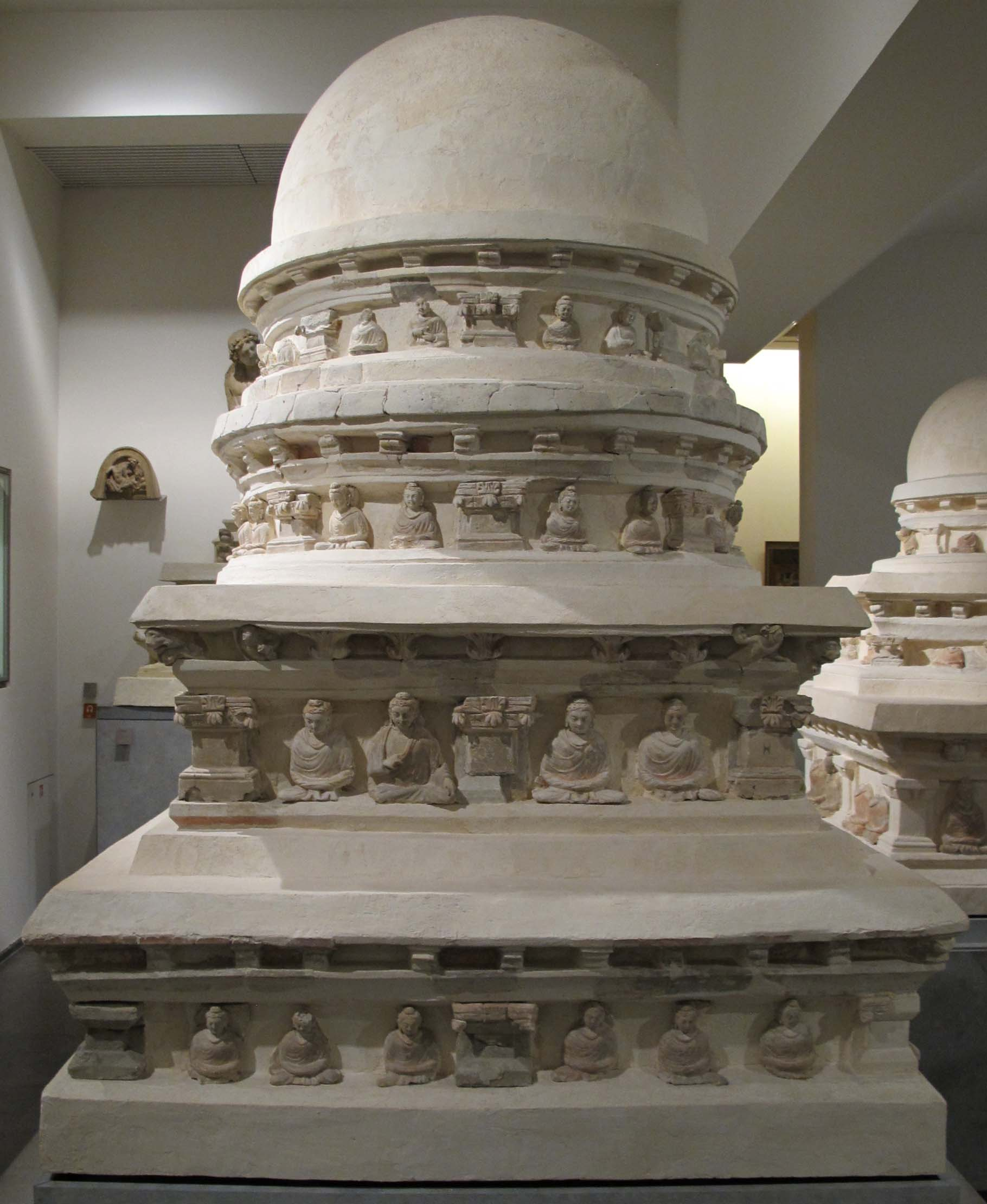
Afghanistan, stupa TK23, hadda site, tapa-kalan monastery, 4th-5th cent

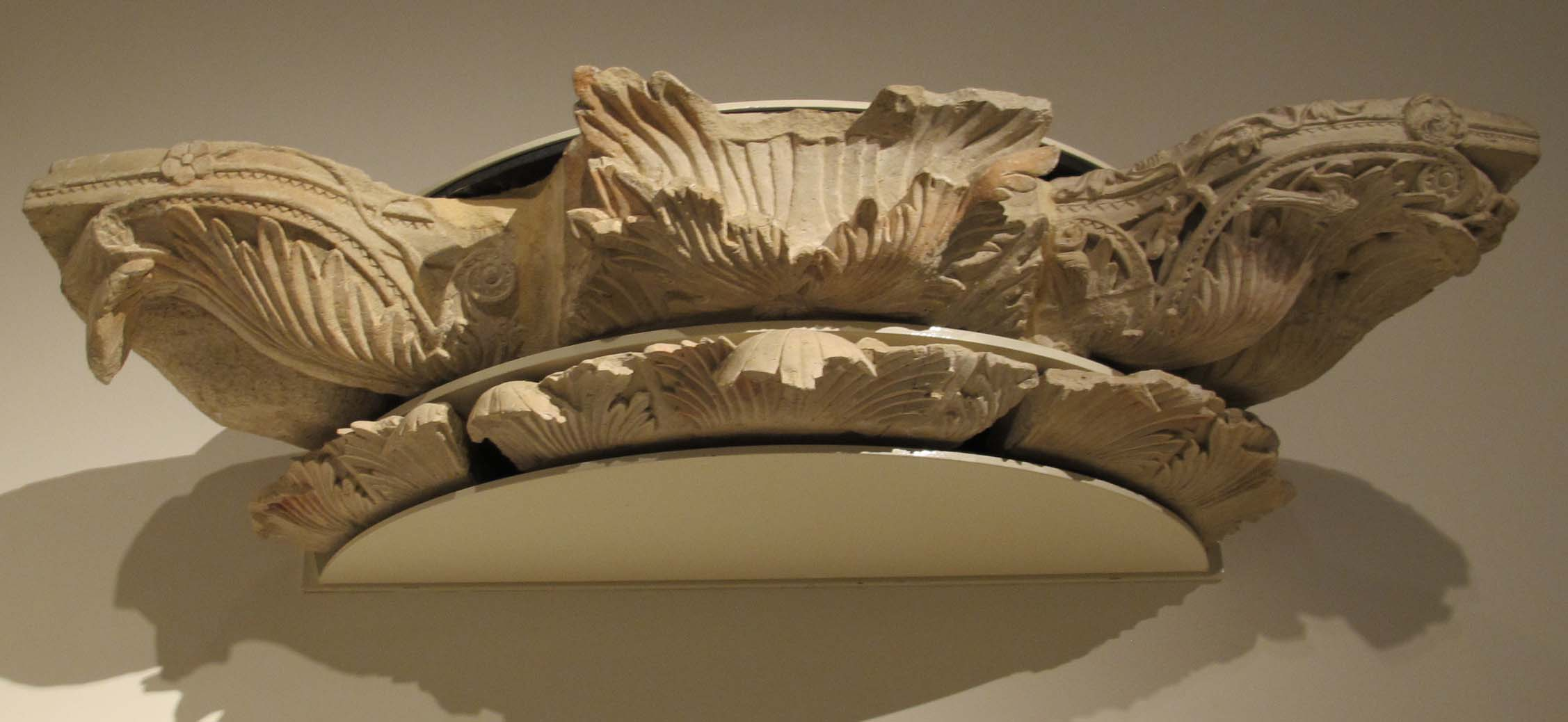
Afghanistan, capital of stupas, from the site of hadda, chakhil-i-ghoundi monastery, II-III century

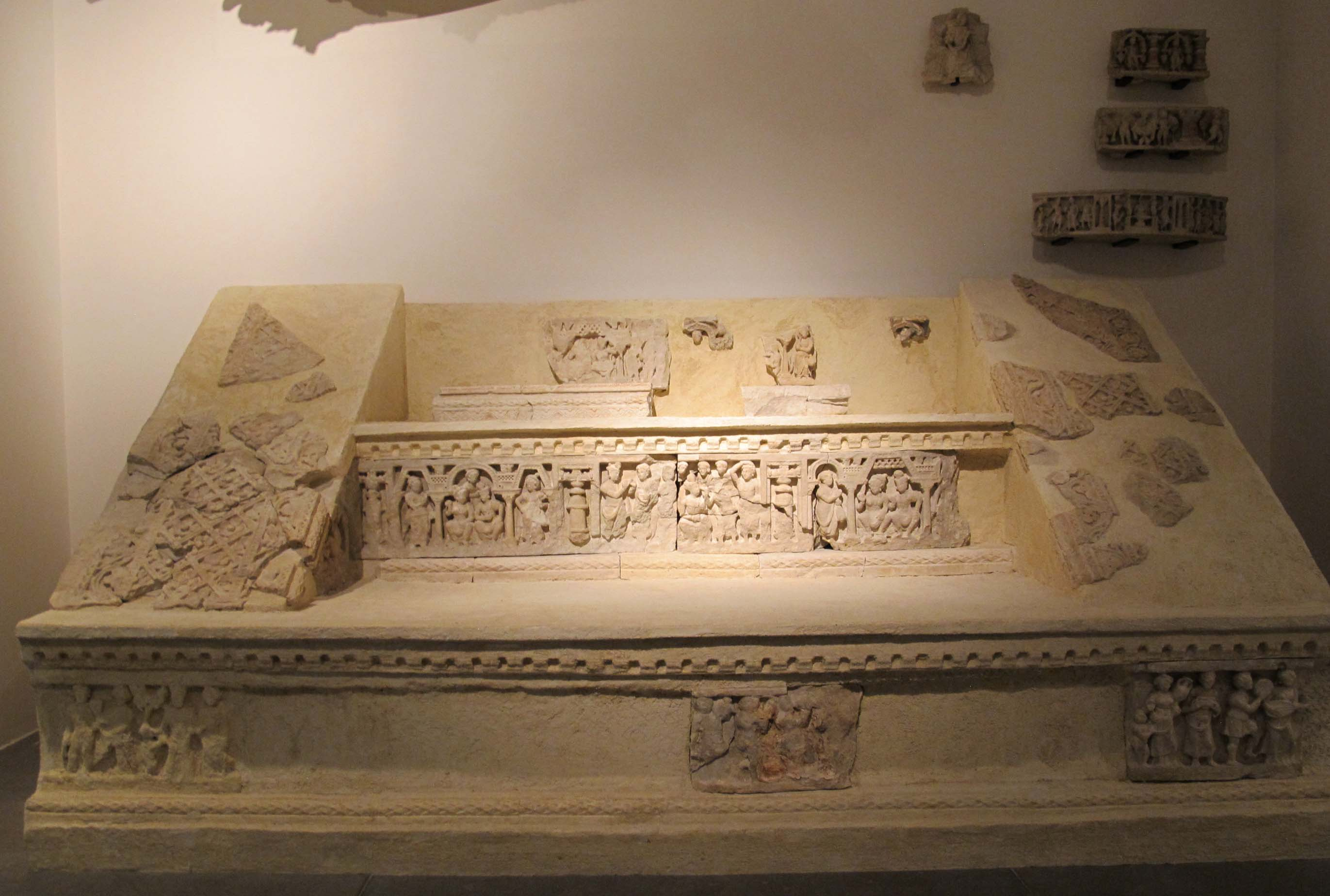
Afghanistan, stairway of stupas, from the site of hadda, chakhil-i-ghoundi monastery, II-III cent

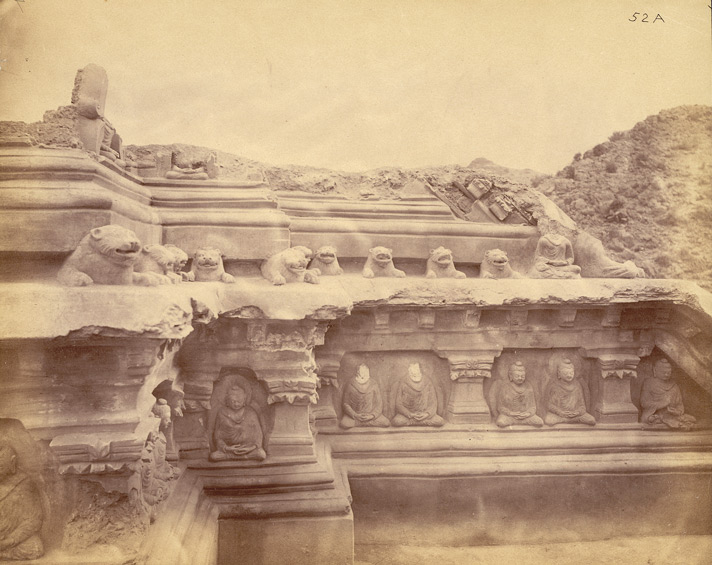
Court with stupa, after excavation, Ali Masjid

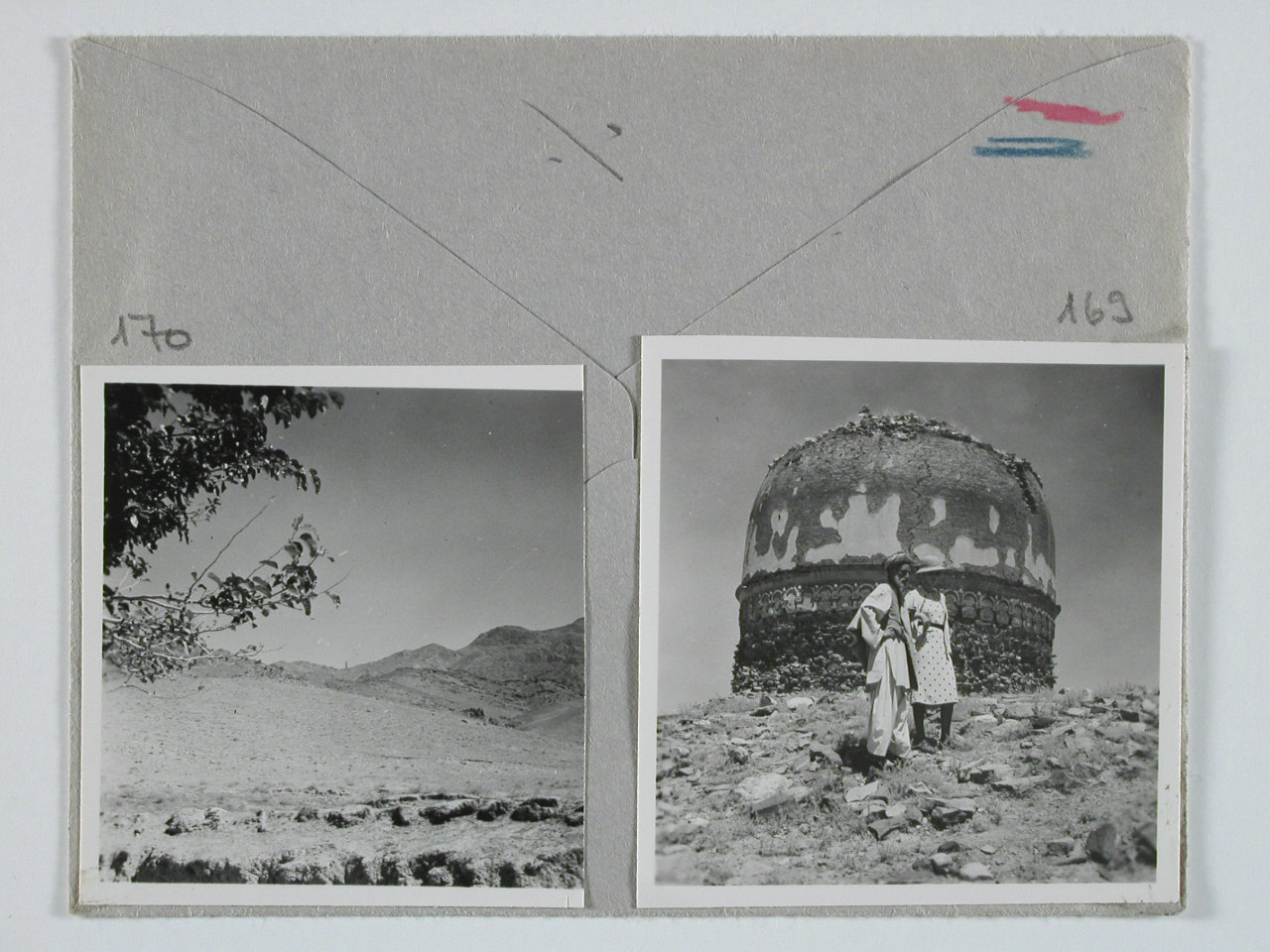
Shewaki stupa

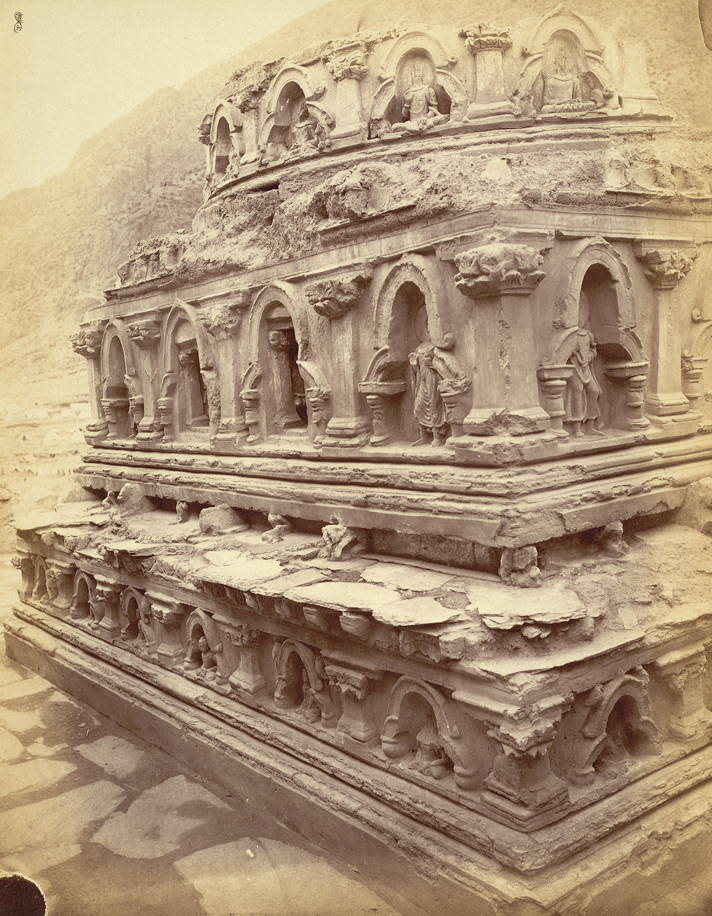
General view of Stupa No. 6, with Buddha images

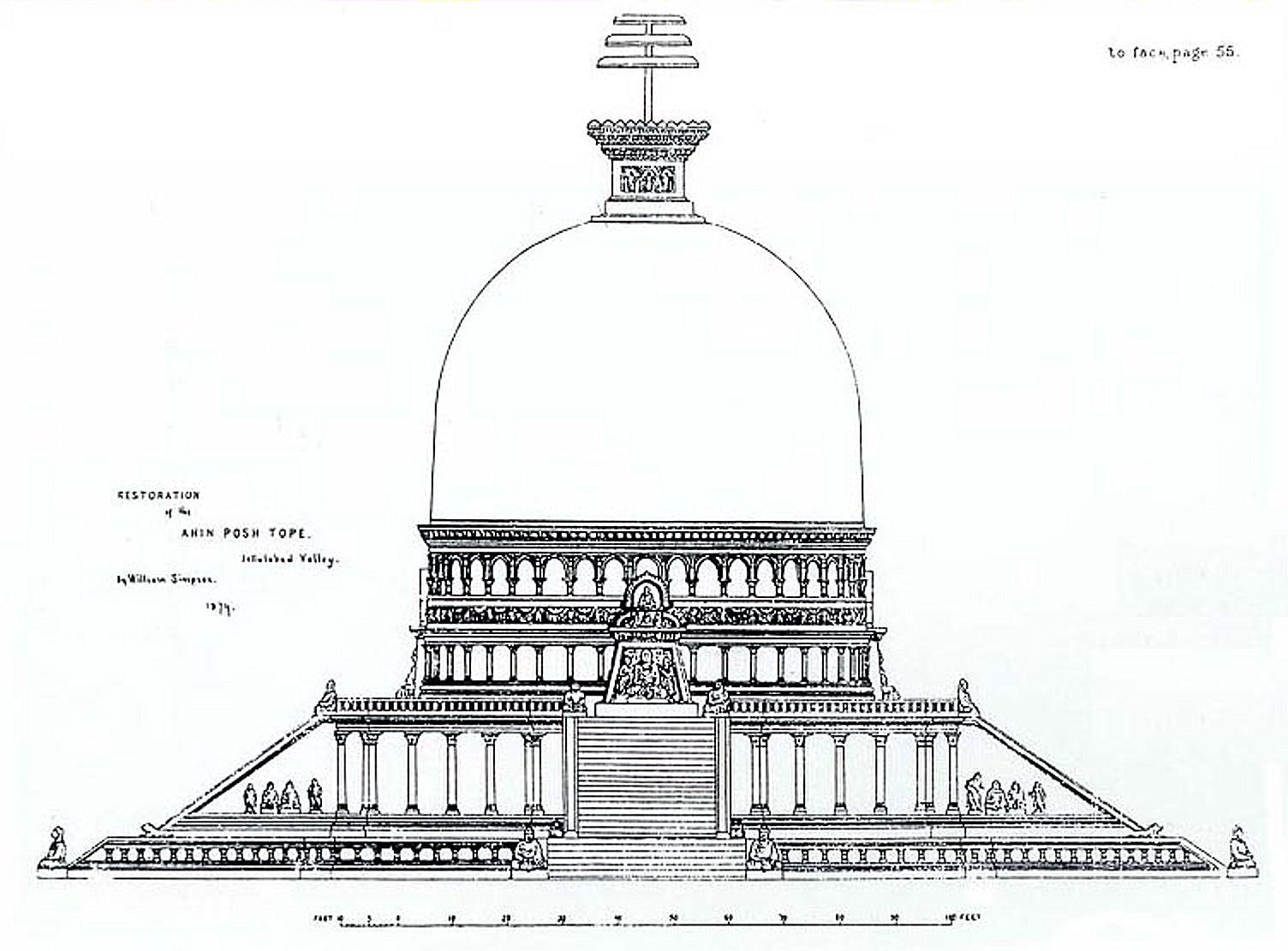
Reconstitution of the Buddhist monastery of Ahin Posh Tepe, Afghanistan

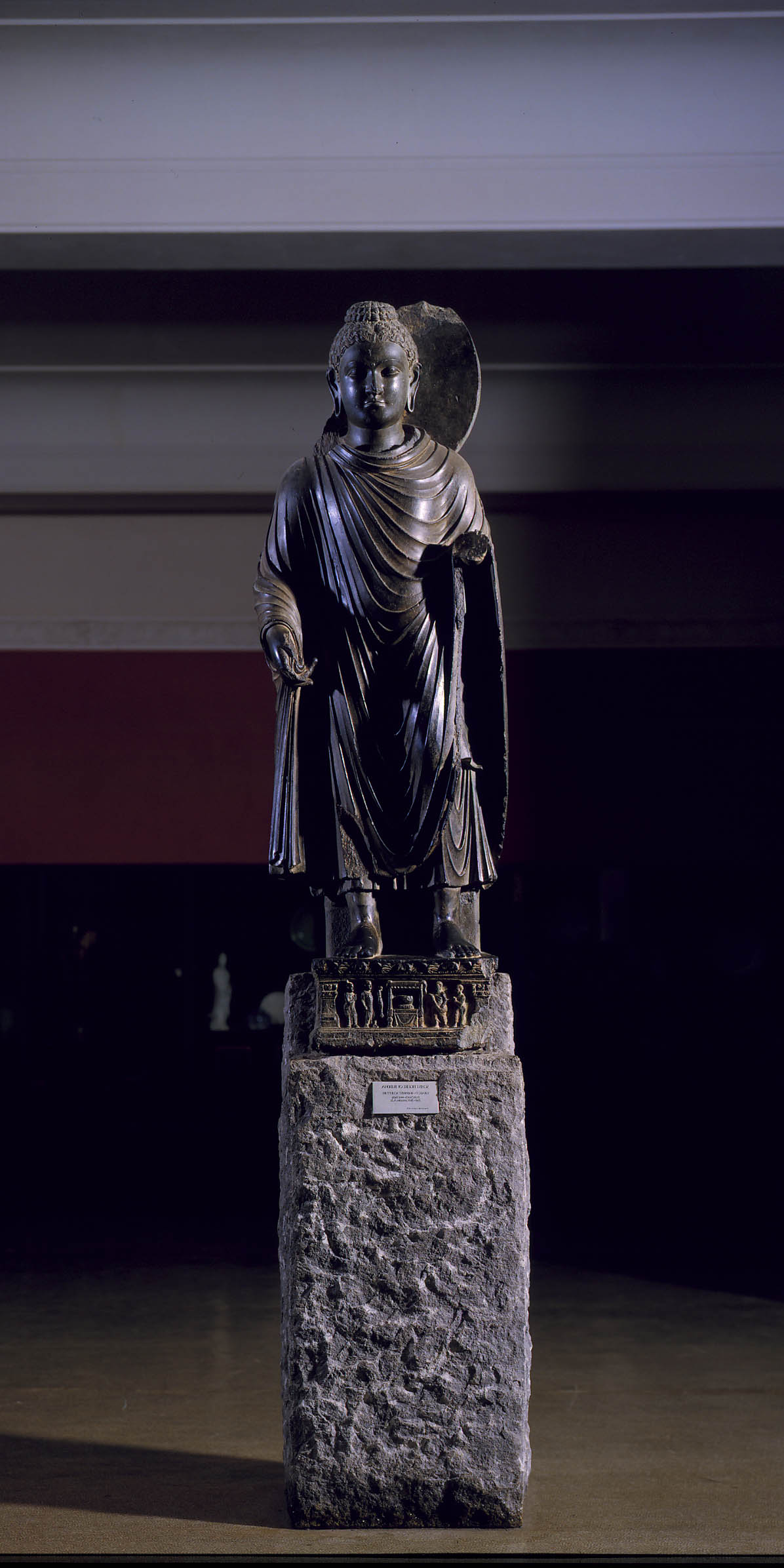
Grey schist figure of Buddha, Auckland Museum

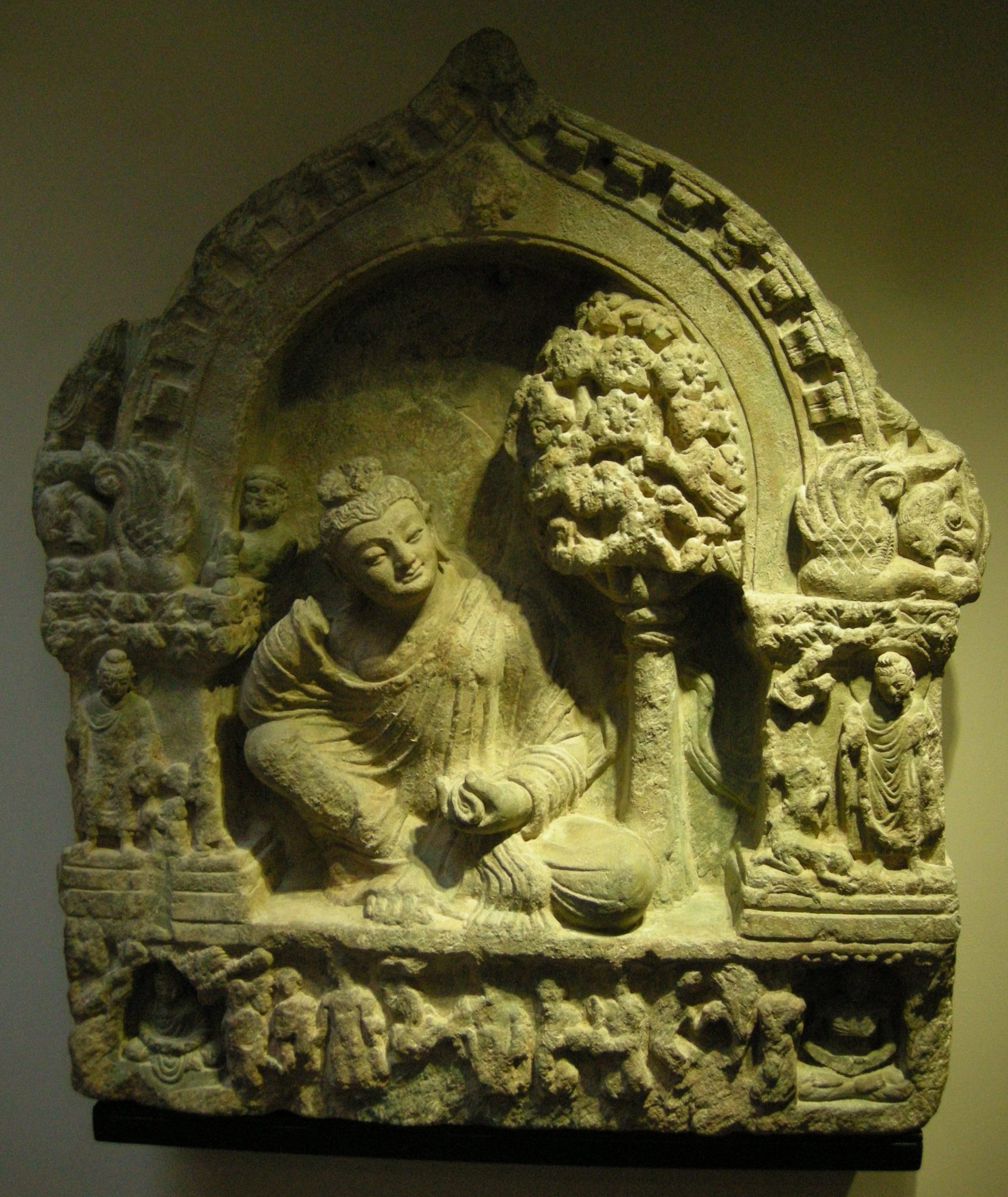
Afghanistan Buddhist art

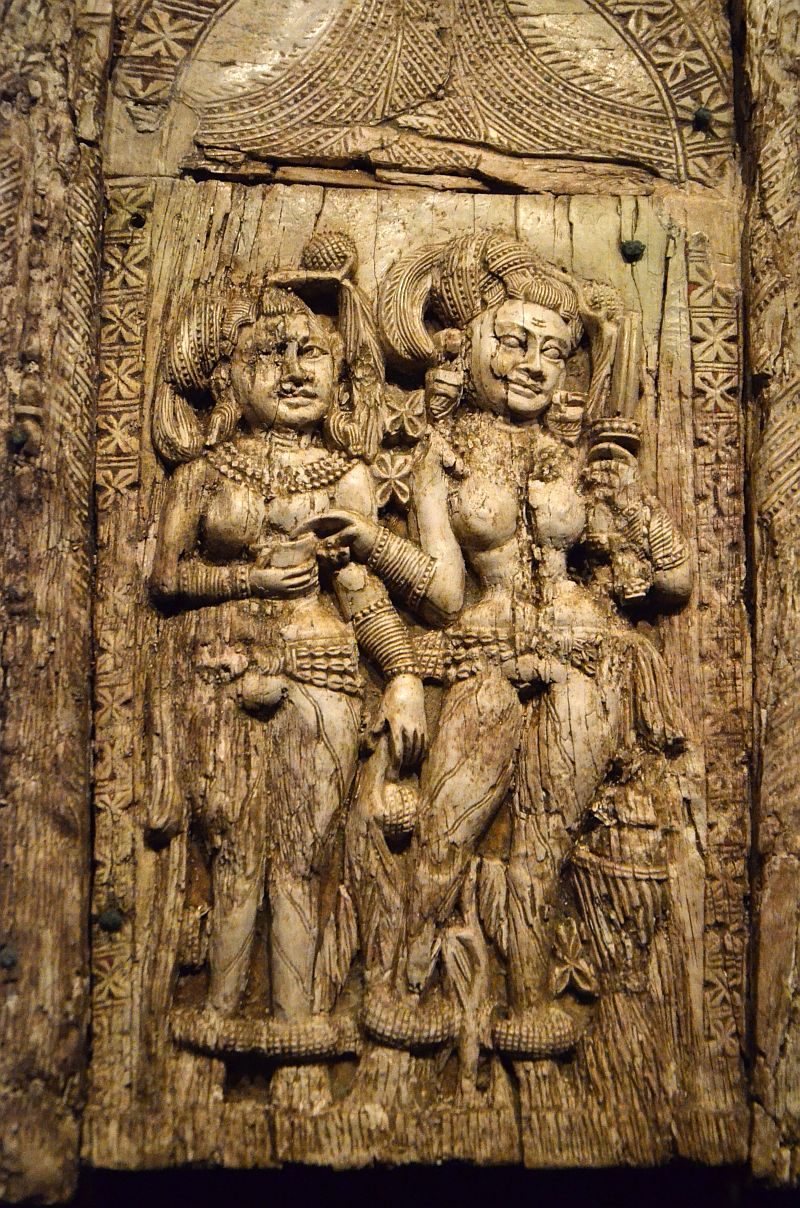
Begram Decorative plaque from a chair or throne, ivory, room 13, c.100 BCE

== See also ==
- Buddhism in Central Asia
- Greco-Buddhism
- Great Tang Records on the Western Regions
- Jñānagupta
- Kandahar Greek Edicts of Ashoka
- Kandahar Bilingual Rock Inscription
- Pre-Islamic Hindu and Buddhist heritage of Afghanistan
- Silk Road transmission of Buddhism
- Decline of Buddhism in the Indian subcontinent
- Hinduism in Afghanistan
- Trapusa and Bahalika
