= Modern Asian Studies =

- Discipline: Asian studies
- Language: English
- Edited by: Johan Elverskog, Sumit Guha, A. Azfar Moin, Robert M. Oppenheim

Publication details
- History: 1967–present
- Publisher: Cambridge University Press
- Frequency: Bimonthly
- Impact factor: 1.075 (2021)

Standard abbreviations
- ISO 4: Mod. Asian Stud.

Indexing
- ISSN: 0026-749X (print); 1469-8099 (web)

Links
- Journal homepage

Modern Asian Studies is a bimonthly peer-reviewed academic journal in the field of Asian studies, published by Cambridge University Press. The journal was established in 1967 by the Syndics of the University of Cambridge and the Committee of Directors at the Centre of South Asian Studies (CSAS), a joint initiative among SOAS University of London, University of Cambridge, University of Hull, University of Leeds, and University of Sheffield. The journal covers the history, sociology, economics, and culture of modern Asia.

Since 2021, the journal has been co-edited by Johan Elverskog, (Southern Methodist University), Sumit Guha, A. Azfar Moin, and Robert M. Oppenheim (all at the University of Texas, Austin). The previous editor was Norbert Peabody (University of Cambridge).

== History ==
In 1947, the Scarbrough Commission asserted that knowledge of Asian countries needed to be granted a permanent place in British academia. The commission, in its report, believed that knowledge of the histories, cultures, and languages of Asia were "quite inadequate for Britain's national purposes."

Ralph Lilley Turner, the second Director of the School of Oriental and African Studies (SOAS), requested state funding to implement the commission's recommendations, which began in 1948. SOAS planned to appoint 18 professors, 35 readers, and 114 lectures over a five-year time period. The launching of an academic journal in 1967 represented the culmination of these efforts.

The journal nowadays publishes monographic essays on a wide range of topics that are supported with empirical data. It is one of the leading journals in the field and has long been considered the flagship area studies journal of Cambridge University Press.

== Abstracting and indexing ==
The journal is abstracted and indexed in:

- Bibliography of Asian Studies
- Scopus
- Social Sciences Citation Index
- Worldwide Political Science Abstracts

According to the Journal Citation Reports, the journal has a 2021 impact factor of 1.075.
