= Buddhism and Islam on the Silk Road =

2010 book by Johan Elverskog

- Author: Johan Elverskog
- Language: English
- Series: Encounters with Asia
- Subject: Buddhist–Muslim relations, Silk Road, Inner Asia
- Genre: History of religion
- Publisher: University of Pennsylvania Press
- Publication date: 2010
- Publication place: United States
- Pages: 340 (hardcover); 352 (paperback)
- Awards: Award for Excellence in the Historical Study of Religion, American Academy of Religion (2011)
- ISBN: 978-0-8122-4237-9 (hardcover)
- OCLC: 2009044830

Buddhism and Islam on the Silk Road is a 2010 book by Johan Elverskog, published by the University of Pennsylvania Press as part of the Encounters with Asia series. Elverskog investigates the history of Buddhist–Muslim relations across Inner Asia, from Afghanistan to Mongolia, over a period spanning from the eighth century through the nineteenth century. The book challenges the widespread narrative that the relationship between Buddhism and Islam was defined by violent confrontation, arguing instead that the two traditions engaged in prolonged economic, intellectual, artistic, and political exchange alongside periods of conflict. The book received the 2011 Award for Excellence in the Historical Study of Religion from the American Academy of Religion.

== Summary ==
Elverskog questions the dominant narrative of Buddhist–Muslim interaction: the story of the Muslim destruction of the Buddhist monastery of Nalanda in 1202, an episode that, he argues, has come to encapsulate the entire thirteen-hundred-year history between the two traditions despite being incomplete. Nalanda, Elverskog contends, continued to function well into the thirteenth century, and Buddhism survived in India at least until the seventeenth century, meaning that Buddhists and Muslims lived together on the subcontinent for nearly a thousand years. He shows that the modern popular perception of Buddhism and Islam as opposed traditions—one synonymous with peace and rationality, the other with violence and irrationality—is itself a product of nineteenth-century Western constructions rather than historical reality. The book shifts its geographical focus away from India to Inner Asia, the wide swath of territory stretching from Afghanistan to Mongolia, and extends its temporal scope from the earliest contacts through the nineteenth century. To provide a structure, the chapters are arranged chronologically, with each organized around a distinct thematic concern—economics, intellectual history, art, political conflict, or religious law—that frames the material in terms of broader historiographical questions.

Elverskog argues that the earliest encounters between Buddhists and Muslims, from the eighth to the eleventh century, were shaped by economic competition rather than theological antagonism. Buddhism had become the cosmopolitan religion of the urban trading elite across Asia, sustained by a system linking the production of wealth to spiritual merit, and Islam, arriving in northwest India and Central Asia, offered an alternative fulfilling many of the same economic and institutional functions. The early Muslim state kept local Buddhist elites in place, granted Buddhists protected status, and permitted the restoration of temples; it was the gradual displacement of Buddhist merchants by Muslim competitors within the expanding commercial world of the Caliphate, Elverskog contends, rather than military conquest, that drove the decline of Buddhism in these regions. Alongside this economic shift, both traditions attempted to comprehend the other. The Abbasid court under the Barmakid viziers, a family of Buddhist origin from Balkh, promoted the translation of Sanskrit texts into Arabic and channelled Indian knowledge in astronomy, medicine, and mathematics into the Islamic world; after the Barmakids fell, Elverskog argues, Muslim knowledge of Buddhism froze at the eighth-century level and was repeated without revision for centuries. On the Buddhist side, the Kālacakratantra of the early eleventh century contains the first extensive Buddhist response to Islam, including the apocalyptic myth of Shambhala prophesying a future Buddhist savior who would annihilate the forces of Islam. Yet material exchanges continued alongside this hostility: the life of the Buddha entered Arabic literature as the tale of Bilawhar and Budasaf and later reached Christian Europe as the legend of Barlaam and Josaphat.

The Mongol conquests of the thirteenth and fourteenth centuries shattered the earlier division of Eurasia into separate economic zones, bringing Buddhists and Muslims together under a single political regime. Rulers such as Hülegü and Khubilai Khan supported both traditions at once, and the presence of Tibetan lamas, Uygur Buddhists, and Muslim scholars at Mongol courts created conditions for new forms of exchange. Elverskog gives particular attention to Rashid al-Din, the Il-khanid vizier whose Compendium of Chronicles he regards as the most detailed and sympathetic Muslim account of Buddhism written before the modern era, one that presented the Buddha as a prophet and drew parallels between Buddhist and Islamic concepts. He argues that the Buddhist culture of early Mongol Iran played a formative but since-forgotten role in the Il-khanid visual tradition, including the unprecedented artistic depiction of the Prophet Muhammad, which he links to the Buddhist practice of using visual media to propagate the faith. Once the Mongols converted to Islam, both they and their Muslim subjects had reason to obscure these origins, and the artistic tradition continued in dissociated form under the Timurids, Safavids, Mughals, and Ottomans.

The collapse of the Mongol political order gave way to a widening divide between Buddhist and Muslim polities. Elverskog identifies six interlocking factors: the spread of jihad rhetoric, the decline of Chinggisid legitimacy, political fragmentation, Islamization, urbanization, and the rise of Naqshbandi Sufism. The Naqshbandi order promoted the enforcement of Islamic law and sedentarization among the once-nomadic Moghuls of Eastern Turkestan, while Tibetan lamas consolidated the theocratic power of the Dalai Lama with Mongol military support. Yet the picture remained more complex than a simple clash: the Oirad abandoned Islam for Buddhism under the influence of Tibetan lamas—one of the few instances in history of a people giving up Islam without force—and the majority of religiously motivated violence, Elverskog argues, was directed inward rather than across the confessional divide. Under the Qing dynasty (1644–1911), the two communities were reunited within a single empire, and the question of halal slaughter became a flashpoint, rooted in Chinggis Khan's purported decree mandating a Mongol method of killing animals incompatible with Islamic practice. The book culminates with the nineteenth-century Mongol writer Injannashi, who challenged centuries of anti-Muslim polemics by arguing that all religious practices derive from an inherent human goodness and that the intentions of Buddhists and Muslims are the same. Elverskog concludes that the perceived eternal divide between the two traditions is a product of specific historical circumstances—the legacy of the Qing and the narratives of Western colonial-era scholarship—rather than an inherent feature of either religion.

== Reception ==
Christian Noack called the study "path-breaking" and commended its enormous scope, which covered Buddhist–Muslim contacts across an area far greater than the term "Silk Road" in the title might suggest.

Religious studies scholar Kristian Petersen found that Elverskog was successful in presenting the complexity of Buddhist–Muslim stereotypes and in outlining the rich history of interaction between the two traditions. Petersen highlighted the author's insistence that both Islam and Buddhism must be understood as polyvalent and multivocal.

Larry Poston described the book as a detailed, college-level work that explored how each religion was transformed by its encounter with the other. He found the chief lesson to be that both Islam and Buddhism were "far more malleable than is commonly supposed," and stressed the book's corrective to the common view that the Mongols became Muslims.

In his review for the Journal of Asian History, Paul D. Buell acknowledged that Elverskog made "a major contribution" in debunking stereotypes of an aggressive Islam and an otherworldly Buddhism. He found the discussion of early Islamic appreciations of India and Buddhism to be among the most interesting parts of the book, but criticised what he saw as a neglect of maritime contacts and of the Chinese side of the Silk Road, arguing that this led to distortions regarding the Muslim presence in Ming-dynasty China.

Ronit Yoeli-Tlalim identified the chapter on halal as compelling in its treatment of food not as nutrition but as "a powerful means of drawing boundaries," and commended Elverskog's methodological point that the absence of Buddhist references in Muslim sources should not be taken as evidence that Buddhism did not exist in those regions. She recommended the book as required reading not only for students of religion and history but also for politicians and religious leaders.

Yang Bin welcomed the work as a multidimensional macro-study whose "breadth, depth, and complexity are highly admirable." He praised Elverskog for refuting popular misconceptions and analysing the historical processes behind their creation. He suggested, however, that the book would have benefited from greater attention to Buddhist–Muslim relations in Southeast Asia and from more extensive consultation of primary Chinese sources.

Historian Zvi Ben-Dor Benite found that the book recast the narrative of Buddhism's exit from Inner Asia in the wake of Islam's entrance, calling Elverskog's undertaking ambitious in part because the region remained under-researched. Ben-Dor Benite thought that "with this book" the history of Buddhist–Muslim interaction "begins wonderfully."

T. H. Barrett, from SOAS University of London, said that the author banished the "simple clashing of civilizations model" in favour of a picture marked by "an almost fractal complexity." Barrett thought that while the final chapter drew on Elverskog's own research into Mongol sources, the earlier chapters relied on a creative synthesis of existing scholarship, and he expressed hope that future editions would update the bibliography and correct a few factual errors drawn from secondary sources, such as the apparent confusion of the Chinese traveller Wukong with the Korean pilgrim Hyecho.

== Awards ==
The book received the 2011 Award for Excellence in the Historical Study of Religion from the American Academy of Religion.
