= Elliot Sperling =

American historian (1951–2017)

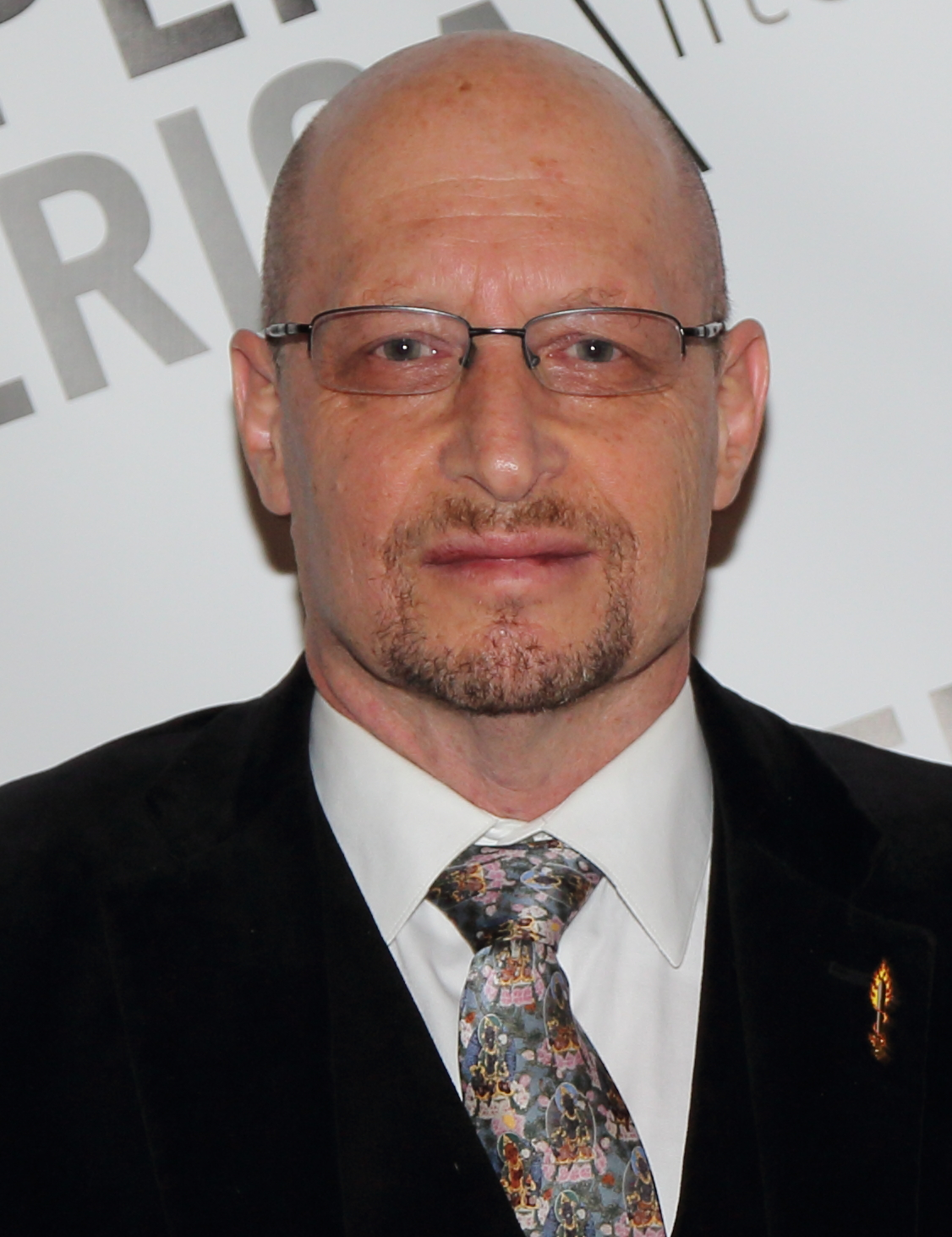
- Sperling at PEN America/ Free Expression Literature, May 2014.
- Born: January 4, 1951; New York City
- Died: January 29, 2017 (aged 66)
- Education: Queens College

Elliot Sperling (January 4, 1951 – January 29, 2017) was one of the world's leading historians of Tibet and Tibetan-Chinese relations, and a MacArthur Fellow. He spent most of his scholarly career as an associate professor at Indiana University's Department of Central Eurasian Studies, with seven years as the department's chair.

== Biography ==
Born and raised in New York City to a family that underscored the importance of education, hard work, modesty, and social responsibility, Sperling developed a political and social awareness from a very young age. Attending Queens College in the early 1970s at the height of the counterculture movement only served to kindle in him a youthful idealism that was never extinguished. While in college, Sperling traveled widely. An overland journey from Istanbul to Delhi with stops in the fabled cities of Erzurum, Tabriz, Tehran, and Herat fueled his passion for the study of faraway lands. A short sojourn in India developed into a love affair with that country and culture; Sperling would revisit India numerous times later (including as a Fulbright fellow). Upon his return from Delhi, having encountered for the first time Tibetans in exile, Sperling changed his major to East Asian studies.

Equipped with knowledge of Chinese made stronger by an overseas study of the language in Taiwan, Sperling matriculated at Indiana University's Department of Uralic and Altaic Studies (renamed Central Eurasian Studies in 1993), where his career would be shaped and developed for the next four decades. The department was already internationally renowned, in part owing to the presence on the faculty of Taktser Rinpoche, the Dalai Lama's eldest brother. Sperling studied modern and classical Tibetan, polished his knowledge of modern and classical Chinese, and wrote his doctoral dissertation, Early Ming Policy toward Tibet: An Examination of the Proposition that the Early Ming Emperors Adopted a "Divide and Rule" Policy toward Tibet, in 1983. The dissertation has been widely acknowledged as the most influential study on the subject.

A product of the public education system, Sperling took his first faculty position also at a public institution, the University of Southern Mississippi (USM). Shortly after arriving in Hattiesburg, he was awarded the prestigious MacArthur Fellowship (1984–89). After a short spell at USM, Sperling returned to Indiana University in 1987, as a faculty member. He would remain at the university, a much-loved teacher, until December 2015, with occasional visiting professorships elsewhere, including Harvard University (1992–93) and the University of Delhi (1994–95). Over the years, Sperling mentored numerous graduate students who pursue both academic and nonacademic careers all over the world.

After his retirement from Indiana University, Sperling moved to Jackson Heights in New York City, an area known for its vibrant Tibetan population. Sperling died in January 2017.

== Research ==
In his research, based predominantly on original, primary sources in Tibetan and Chinese, Sperling focused on questions of sovereignty and boundaries; on types of political, social, and familial authority; on Chinese policy toward Tibet; and on the complicated roles of Tibetan officials in the service of both Tibetan and Chinese governments. He wrote about bureaucrats, monks, mediators, and envoys to the Tangut, Yuan, Ming, and Qing courts, and his research covered many periods, ranging from the ninth century to the present. In addition to his focus on the Ming period, Sperling is especially recognized for his interventions on the study of the Tangut people, on Mongol presence in and influence on Tibet in the seventeenth and eighteenth centuries, on the reign of the Fifth Dalai Lama and other eminent personalities of his era, and on Tibet's status under the Qing. Sperling served on, consulted or directed numerous professional boards.

In his work, "Sperling has been a judicious voice in increasingly less discerning times. He has censured (including during appearances in China) the Chinese government’s oppressive policies in Tibet. He has criticized the Dalai Lama and Tibet’s government-in-exile (also during appearances in India) for giving up on Tibetan independence and for their ignorance of China’s real positions. He has rejected the Tibetophiles’ view of Tibet as an unspoiled bastion of pure spirituality. And he never had much patience for scholars who easily become groupies of academic fashions."

In 2014, a festschrift in his honor, entitled Trails of the Tibetan Tradition: Papers for Elliot Sperling, was published by the Amnye Machen Institute in Dharamshala, India. The volume is open access through the Revue d'Études Tibétaines.

== Human rights ==
Sperling also was a champion of human rights. Most recently, his public engagement was exemplified in the case of Ilham Tohti. Tohti, a Uyghur professor of economics at Minzu University in Beijing, was to spend a year at Indiana University—at the university’s invitation—in 2014 as a visiting professor. He was detained in the Beijing airport, just prior to boarding his flight to Indianapolis, on charges of “separatism” (charges that were characterized as completely made up by the U.S. State Department, the European Union, and many other international bodies) and has since been sentenced by the Chinese government to life imprisonment. Sperling became one of the most outspoken individual voices arguing for Ilham Tohti's innocence and release. This endeavor was not new for Sperling. He had served on the Committee on Religious Freedom Abroad for the U.S. Department of State (1996–99), and he had testified before the Groupe d’information du Sénat sur le Tibet (France), the Parliamentary Human Rights Group (United Kingdom), the Congressional-Executive Committee on China, the Senate Committee on Foreign Relations, the House of Representatives Committee on International Relations, and many others. His expertise was particularly requested on matters of human rights in Tibet, Tibet-China relations, ethnic minorities in China, and U.S.–China relations. His opinion pieces and commentary were published in publications such as the New York Times, the Los Angeles Times, the Times of India, Jane’s Intelligence Review, and the Far Eastern Economic Review. He was praised in one obituary after his death as "a true ally of the Tibetan people and an unwavering champion of Tibetan freedom."

== Publications ==
For an extensive list of Elliot Sperling's publications, consult Trails of the Tibetan Tradition: Papers for Elliot Sperling.

- "Concerning the Lingering Question of Sde-srid Sangs-rgyas rgya-mtsho’s Paternity," Rocznik Orientalistyczny 67/1 (2014), 202–221.
- "Si tu paṇ chen Chos kyi ’byung gnas in History: A Brief Note," Journal of the International Association for Tibetan Studies 7 (2013), 1–16.
- "The 1 13 Tibeto-Mongol Treaty: Its International Reception and Circulation," Lungta 17 (2013), 7–14.
- Sperling, Elliot (2004). The Tibet-China Conflict: History and Polemics (PDF). Washington: East-West Center. ISBN 1-932728-13-9. ISSN 1547-1330. Archived from the original (PDF) on 2008-08-19.
- "Notes on the Early History of Gro-tshang Rdo-rje-'change and Its Relations with the Ming Court," Lungta, (2000).
- "Tibet," in John Block Friedman and Kristen Mossler Figg, eds., Medieval Trade, Travel, and Explorations: An Encyclopedia (New York, 2000).
- "Exile and Dissent: The Historical and Cultural Context," in Tibet Since 1950 (New York, 2000).
- "Awe and Submission: A Tibetan Aristocrat at the Court of Qianlong," International Review of History, vol 20, (1998).
- "«Orientalism» and Aspects of Violence in the Tibetan Tradition" in Thierry Dodin and Heinz Räther, eds., Mythos Tibet, (Bonn, 1997).
- "Tibétains, Mongols et Mandchous," in Françoise Pommaret, eds., Lhasa lieu du divin (Geneva, 1997).
- (Editor) Lungta vol. vol. 17, 2013: The Centennial of the Tibeto-Mongol Treaty: 1913–2013.
- "Conversations and Debates: Chinese and Tibetan Engagement with the Broader Discussion of Self-Immolation in Tibet," Revue d’Etudes tibétaines 25 (December 2012), 89–97.
- (Co-editor, with Kunsang Gya and Andrea Snavely) Minority Language in Today’s Society (New York, 2012).
- "Төвд, Монголын 1913 оны гэрээ: гадаад улсууд хэрхэн хүлээн авсан тухай," in А. Түвшинтѳгс and Д. Зоригт, eds., “Монгол, Төвдийн 1913 оны гэрээ”-олон улсын эрх зүйн баримт бичиг, Ulaanbaatar, 2012, 123–138
- "Reincarnation and the Golden Urn in the 19th Century: The Recognition of the 8th Panchen Lama," in Roberto Vitali, ed., Studies on the History and Literature of Tibet and the Himalaya (Kathmandu, 2012), 97–107.
- "Pho-lha-nas, Khang-chen-nas, and the Last Era of Mongol Domination in Tibet," Rocznik Orientalistyczny 65/1 (2012), 195–211.
- "Les noms du Tibet: géographie et identité," Monde chinois, nouvelle asie 31 (2012), 27–32.
