= György Kara =

Hungarian orientalist and philologist (1935–2022)

- Born: 23 June 1935; Budapest, Hungary
- Died: 16 April 2022 (aged 86); Bloomington, Indiana, United States
- Occupations: Orientalist, Mongolist

Academic background
- Education: Eötvös Loránd University

Academic work
- Institutions: Indiana University
- Doctoral students: Johan Elverskog

György Kara (born György Katulics, 23 June 1935 – 16 April 2022) was a Hungarian orientalist, philologist, and specialist in Mongol studies and Mongolian philology.

== Biography ==
György Kara came from a working class family in Hungary. For his undergraduate education he studied at Eötvös Loránd University (ELTE) in Budapest under Gyula Németh, Barnabás Csongor, and Lajos Ligeti. The latter professor insisted that his students use Hungarian or Altaic surnames, so György's adopted surname became Kara, the Turco-Mongol word for "Black", thereafter being known as György Kara or Khar Dorj (Mongolian: Хар Дорж, romanized: Khar Dorj or Mongolian: ᠬᠠᠷ᠎ᠠ
ᠳᠣᠷᠵᠢ, romanized: Kara Dorji, lit. 'Black Dorj') in Mongolia. Visiting Mongolia in 1957 for fieldwork and graduating in 1958, he continued his research under Ligeti, with a university doctorate from ELTE in 1961, a Candidacy in Linguistic Science from the Hungarian Academy of Sciences in 1967, and a Doctorate of Philological Sciences from Leningrad State University in 1975. He joined the ELTE faculty in 1958 and was promoted to professor in 1978, during which time he served under various positions at the Hungarian Academy and his university.

In 1986 and 1988 he was invited as a visiting professor at the Central Eurasian Studies Department of Indiana University Bloomington, and soon after in 1992 received tenure as a full professor with the fall of the Eastern Bloc, though he continued teaching at ELTE. Kara settled permanently in Bloomington in 2005, and continued teaching and research until his passing, with his later research devoted to reference books in the English language.

== Personal life ==
György Kara's first wife was the daughter of noted Mongolian scholar Byambyn Rinchen, Rinchenii Shinzaa (−1999). Married in 1958, they had a son and daughter. Kara remarried to Mongolist Marta Kiripolská in 2003.
