= Narenj Hill =

Archaeological site in Kabul, Afghanistan

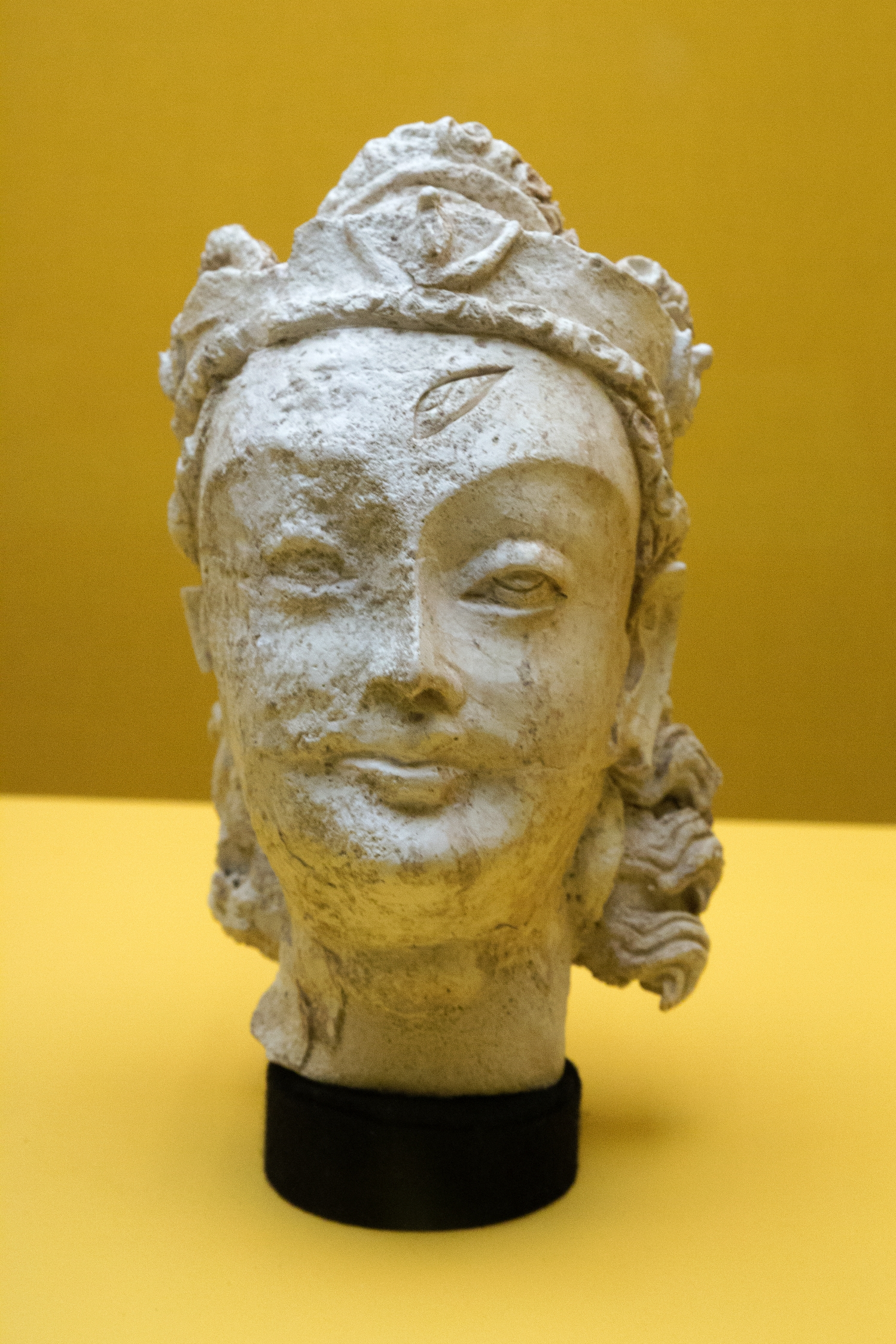
- Head of a king or bodhisattva, stucco, Tepe Narenj, 3rd-6th century CE.

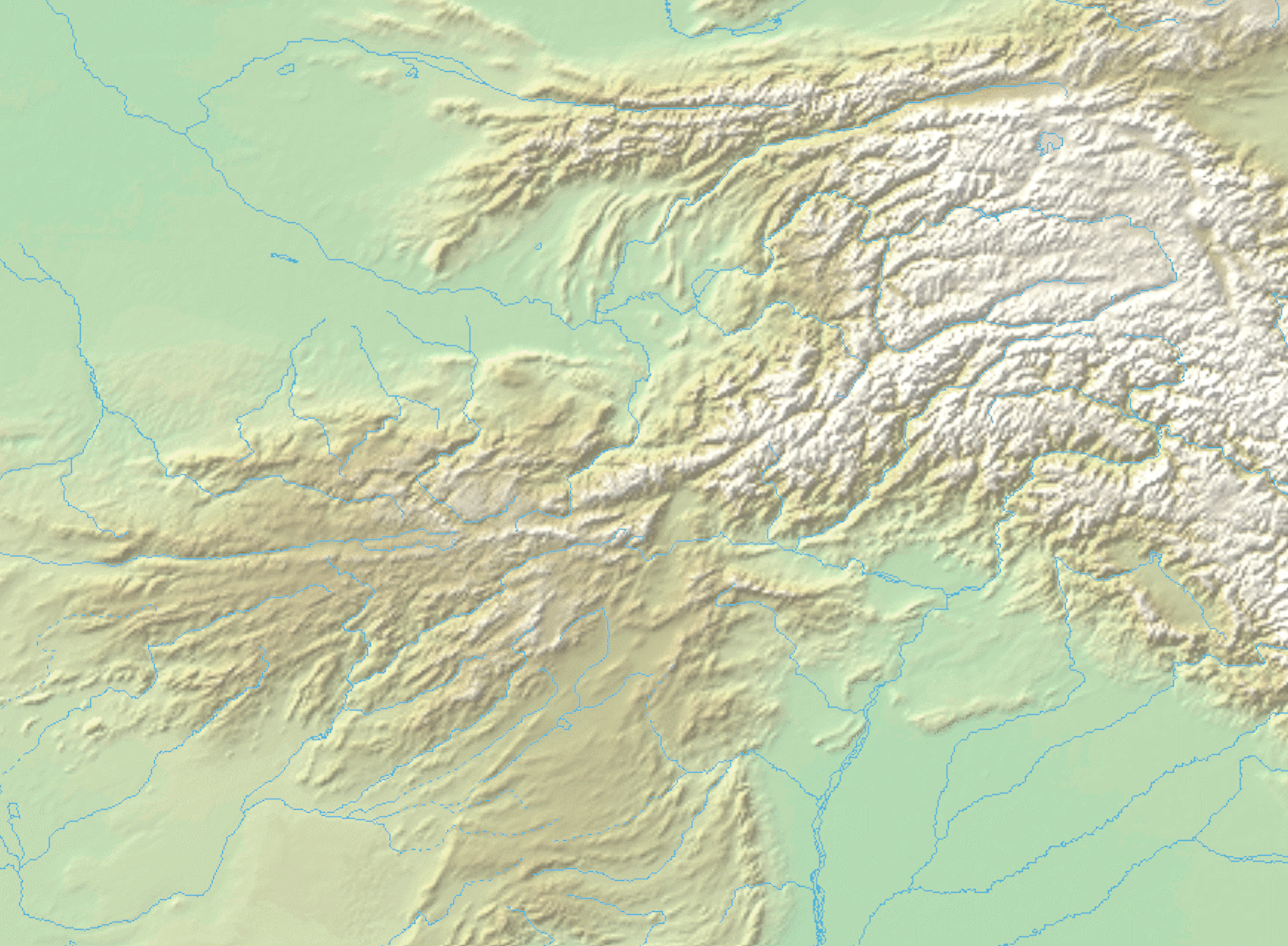
- Location within Afghanistan Location within Hindu-Kush Location within South Asia Location within West and Central Asia
- 34.491958°N 69.181894°E
- Type: Monastery

Narenj Hill, locally known as Tepe Narenj (meaning orange hill), is an archaeological site for the remains of a 5th or 6th century Buddhist monastery in the southeast of Kabul, Afghanistan. The site is located on a hillside at the foot of Zamburak Shah Mountain, near the ancient Bala Hissar and Hashmat Khan Lake. It has been excavated under the direction of Zafar Paiman.

== History ==
The Buddhist monk Xuanzang visited the monastery while returning from India in the 7th century. He documented the area's geography and culture in his work, Great Tang Records on the Western Regions. The iconography of the archaeological artifacts recovered demonstrates the practice of Tantric Buddhism in the area. It is believed that Muslim armies destroyed the monastery in the ninth century and was forgotten until post-conflict excavations following the Soviet–Afghan War.

== The site ==
Foundations for the site were discovered by a joint study, conducted by both the Afghanistan's Archaeological Research Institute and Japan's National Research Institute for Cultural Properties.

The site lies along a hill to the southwest of Bala Hissar and is 250 meters long. It is to the west of Hashmat Khan Lake and was discovered beneath a modern police station. The monastery consists of five small stupas for meditation and five chapels. The Afghan Institute of Archaeology has been excavating at the site for one month each summer since 2005. The site was listed in 2008 among the top 100 sites at risk.

Coins from the Kushans to the Hindu Shahis were found at the site.

== Threats ==
Given the material at the site and the fact that the site is uncovered, it is at significant risk for erosion. The sculpture found at the site are made of "clay overlaid with fabric and covered with stucco."

== See also ==
- Archaeology of Afghanistan
- Tourism in Afghanistan
