= Naw Bahar =

Two former Buddhist monasteries

- Interactive map of Naw Bahar
- Type: Buddhist monasteries
- Location: Balkh, Balkh Province, Afghanistan

History
- Built: Second century CE (possibly earlier)
- Built by: Potentially founded by Kushan emperor Kaniska
- Demolished: Damaged during various conflicts

The Naw Bahar (Persian: نوبهار, lit. 'New Monastery, or New Spring') were two Buddhist monasteries close to the ancient city of Balkh in northern Afghanistan. Historical accounts report it as flourishing as an important centre of Buddhism between the seventh and eleventh centuries CE. It may have been founded considerably earlier, perhaps in or after the reign of the Kushan emperor Kaniṣka, in the second century CE.

Nava Vihara has been described as the "Nalanda of Central Asia".

== Rise to prominence ==
Historical accounts report it as flourishing as an important centre of Buddhism between the seventh and eleventh centuries CE. It may have been founded considerably earlier, perhaps in or after the reign of Kaniṣka, in the second century CE.

The Barmakid family were described as the "hereditary rectors" of Naw Bahar the monastery became an intermediary point where Mahayana Buddhist texts from India were translated and then transported to China via the Silk Road trade routes.

== Xuanzang's report ==
In the Great Tang Records on the Western Regions, Xuanzang (玄奘)reports that at the time of his visit to Balkh in 630 there were about a hundred viharas and 30,000 monks, a large number of stupas and other religious monuments, and that Buddhism was flourishing in the Bactrian portion of the Western Turkic Khaganate. He also described it as having strong links with the Kingdom of Khotan in the Tarim Basin. The temple was led by Pramukha, Sanskrit for "leader, administrator", who, under the Arabized name of Barmak, came to be known as the Barmakids).

== History under the Arabs ==
The Umayyad Caliphate captured Balkh in 663 from the Kabul Shahis who had taken over the territory from the Western Turks.

In 708 Nazaktar Khan, a Kabul Shahi prince, in alliance with the Tibetan Empire, recaptured Bactria from the Umayyads and continued Buddhist rule. In 715 Qutayba recaptured the region for the Umayyads and Tibet switched sides to ally with him against the Kabul Shahis. Qutaiba inflicted heavy damage on Nava Vihāra, resulting in many monks fleeing to Khotan and Kashmir.

The Barmakids, who attained great power under the Abbasid Caliphate becoming powerful viziers, are regarded as having their origin in a line of hereditary administrators at Nava Vihāra who had converted to Islam.

An Arab author, Umar ibn al-Azraq al-Kermani, wrote a detailed account of Nava Vihāra at the beginning of the 8th century that is preserved in a later 10th-century work, the Kitab al-Buldan by Ibn al-Faqih. He described Nava Vihara in terms strikingly similar to the Kaaba in Mecca, the holiest site of Islam. He described that the main temple had a stone cube in the center, draped with cloth, and that devotees circumambulated it and made prostration, as is the case with the Kaaba. The stone cube referred to the platform on which a stupa stood, as was the custom in Bactrian temples. The cloth that draped it was in accordance with Persian custom of showing veneration that applied equally to Buddha statues as well as to stupas.

Some Arabic sources erroneously describe the vihāra as a fire temple of Zoroastrianism, presumably because of its proximity to Balkh, Zoroaster's birthplace. In Arabic sources, the monastery's name is represented as "Naubahar". Van Bladel (p. 68) has pointed out that this version of the name can be traced to the pronunciation in the Bactrian language.

Al-Maqrizi mentions the building, believing it was originally a temple to the Moon, built by the mythical king Manuchehr, which Persians converted into a Fire temple after they became Zoroastrian, Maqrizi provides a folk-etymology for the name the Persians gave the custodian of this site, the Barmakids, claiming it meant "governor of Mecca", in actuality it came from "parmak", the older title of the Buddhist stupa.

The Tang Chinese pilgrim Yijing (義浄)visited Nava Vihāra in the 680s and reported it flourishing as a Sarvāstivādin center of study.

Abū Rayḥān al-Bīrūnī, a Persian scholar and writer in service to the Ghaznavids, reported that around the start of the 10th century, the monasteries in Bactria, including Nava Vihāra, were still functioning and decorated with Buddhist frescoes.

A curious notice of this building is found in the writings of Arabian geographer Ibn Hawqal, an Arabian traveler of the 10th century.

== See also ==
- Buddhas of Bamiyan
- Records of the Western Regions
- Silk Road transmission of Buddhism
- Trapusa and Bahalika
- Balkh
