= Hashmat Khan Lake =

National park in Kabul, Afghanistan

- Kol-e Hashmat Khan
- IUCN category IV (habitat/species management area)
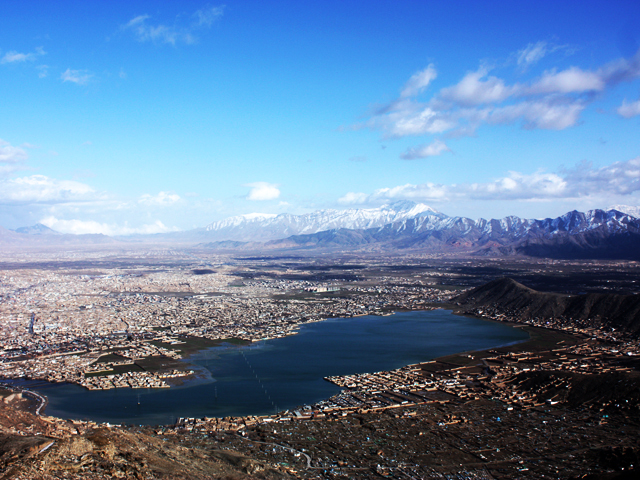

- Location within Afghanistan
- Interactive map of Hashmat Khan Lake
- Location: Kabul, Afghanistan
- Coordinates: 34°29′36″N 69°12′03″E
- Area: 1.66 km^{2} (0.64 sq mi)
- Established: 2017
- Administrator: Ministry of Agriculture, Irrigation and Livestock; Ministry of Information and Culture

Hashmat Khan Lake (Pashto: کول حشمت‌ خان), also known as Hashmat Khan Park, and locally as Kol-e Hashmat Khan or Qala-e Hashmat Khan, is a waterfowl sanctuary and protected area located in Kabul, Afghanistan. The lake or wetland is in the middle of a residential area next to Bala Hissar and to the south of Chaman-e-Hozori, Ghazi Stadium and Id Gah Mosque. To the west is the ancient Narenj Hill.

== History ==
The wetland has existed since ancient time to provide water for irrigation purposes to the residents of Bala Hissar. During the 20th century, King Mohammad Zahir Shah used it for hunting and recreation purposes. Since then many people have illegally built homes around the lake.

In June 2017 the Ministry of Agriculture, Irrigation and Livestock declared Kol-e Hashmat Khan as the fourth national park on the occasion of World Environment Day.

== See also ==
- List of protected areas of Afghanistan
- Qargha
