= Nazif Shahrani =

Professor at Indiana University Bloomington, U.S.

M. Nazif Shahrani is a professor of anthropology, Central Asian Studies, and Middle Eastern Studies at Indiana University, Bloomington.

== Life ==
Nazif Shahrani was born in Badakhshan province of Afghanistan. He completed his elementary education in the village of Shahran-i-Khaash, in Jurm district of Badakhshan, attended Ibnisina (Avecina) Middle School and Kabul Darul Mu'alimin (Kabul Teachers Training High School) in Kabul before entering the Faculty of Education at Kabul University, Afghanistan.

During his junior year at Kabul University, in 1967, he was awarded an East–West Center scholarship by the University of Hawaii, Honolulu where he completed his BA in anthropology (1970). He received an MA and Ph.D. from the University of Washington, Seattle (1972–1976). Between 1972 and 1974, Shahrani conducted anthropological field research in the Wakhan region in northeastern Afghanistan among pastoral nomadic Kyrgyz in the Pamirs and their neighbors the Wakhi agropastoralist community. He later worked as an anthropological consultant for the ethnographic film, The Kirghiz of Afghanistan, which was aired on PBS’s Odyssey series (Fall 1981).

Shahrani has had research and teaching positions at several American Universities, including Harvard’s Center for Middle Eastern Studies, the University of Nevada-Reno, Stanford University, and UCLA, before moving to Indiana University in 1990. He was also a Fellow at the Woodrow Wilson International Center for Scholars of the Smithsonian Institution (1997–98).

He teaches in the departments of Anthropology, Central Eurasian Studies, and Near Eastern Languages and Cultures departments at Indiana University. He has conducted extensive field research in Afghanistan, Turkey, Pakistan and Uzbekistan.

He is the father of three children.

== Contributions ==
His major contributions to Central Asian Studies include:

- The Kirghiz and Wakhi of Afghanistan: Adaptation to Closed Frontiers and War. Seattle. University of Washington Press, 2002.
- Revolutions and Rebellions in Afghanistan: Anthropological Perspectives. M. Nazif Shahrani and Robert L. Canfield, eds. Berkeley, Institute of International Studies, University of California, 1984.
- The Kirghiz and Wakhi of Afghanistan: Adaptation to Closed Frontiers. Seattle, University of Washington Press, 1979.
- More than 40 book chapters in edited volumes and research articles in academic national and international journals.
