= Denis Sinor =

American academic (1916–2011)

Denis Sinor (born Dénes Zsinór, April 17, 1916 in Kolozsvár (Austria-Hungary, now Cluj-Napoca, Romania) – January 12, 2011 in Bloomington, Indiana) was a Distinguished Professor Emeritus of Central Asian Studies at the Department of Central Eurasian Studies at Indiana University and a tenured lecturer at Cambridge University between 1948 and 1962, and was one of the world's leading scholars for the history of Central Asia. Under his directorship, the Central Asian Studies at Indiana University became one of the world's foremost centers for Central Asian history, languages and linguistics.

He grew up in Hungary and Switzerland and went to university in Budapest. During the Second World War, he was a member of the French resistance, served in the French army, and became a French citizen. Sinor wrote eight books and edited an additional thirteen. He authored more than 160 articles in several languages such as English, German, French, Hungarian, Russian and many other, more than 150 book reviews, and also contributed to Encyclopædia Britannica. Sinor served as editor of the Journal of Asian History, between the publication's inception in 1967 and his death in 2011.

== Selected works ==
- History of Hungary. New York: Praeger. 1959.
- Inner Asia; History-Civilization-Languages: A syllabus. Bloomington: Indiana University Press. 1969. ISBN 9780700708963.
- Inner Asia and its Contacts with Medieval Europe. London: Variorum. 1977. ISBN 978-0-86078-001-4.
- The Uralic Languages: description, history, and foreign influences. New York: Brill Publishers. 1988. p. 518. ISBN 978-90-04-07741-6.
- Sinor, Denis, ed. (1990). The Cambridge History of Early Inner Asia. Cambridge: Cambridge University Press. ISBN 978-0-521-24304-9.
- The Uralic and Altaic Series. London: Curzon Press. 1996. ISBN 978-0-7007-0380-7.
- Studies in Medieval Inner Asia. Aldershot, Hampshire: Ashgate Publishing. 1997. ISBN 978-0-86078-632-0.
- Sinor, Denis. 1999. “The Mongols in the West”. Journal of Asian History; 33 (1). Harrassowitz Verlag: 1–44. https://www.jstor.org/stable/41933117.
