= List of protected areas of Afghanistan =

This is a list of protected areas of Afghanistan.

- Ab-i-Estada Nature Reserve, Ghazni Province
- Ajar Valley Nature Reserve, Bamyan Province
- Bamiyan National Heritage Park, Bamyan Province
- Bamiyan Plateau Protected Landscape, Bamyan Province
- Band-e Amir National Park, Bamyan Province
- Darqad (Takhar) Wildlife Reserve, Takhar Province
- Dasht-i-Nawar Waterfowl Sanctuary, Ghazni Province
- Hamun-i-Puzak Waterfowl Sanctuary, Farah and Nimruz provinces
- Imam Sahib (Kunduz) Wildlife Reserve, Kunduz Province
- Khulm Landmark Protected Area, Balkh Province
- Koh-e Baba (Shah Foladi) Protected Landscape, Bamyan province
- Kol-i-Hashmat Khan Waterfowl Sanctuary, Kabul Province
- Northwest Afghanistan Game Managed Reserve, Herat Province
- Nuristan National Park and Wildlife Reserve, Nuristan Province
- Pamir-i-Buzurg Wildlife Reserve, Badakhshan Province
- Registan Desert Wildlife Managed Reserve, Kandahar Province
- Wakhan National Park, Badakhshan Province
- Zadran National Reserve, Paktia Province
