= Johan Elverskog =

American historian

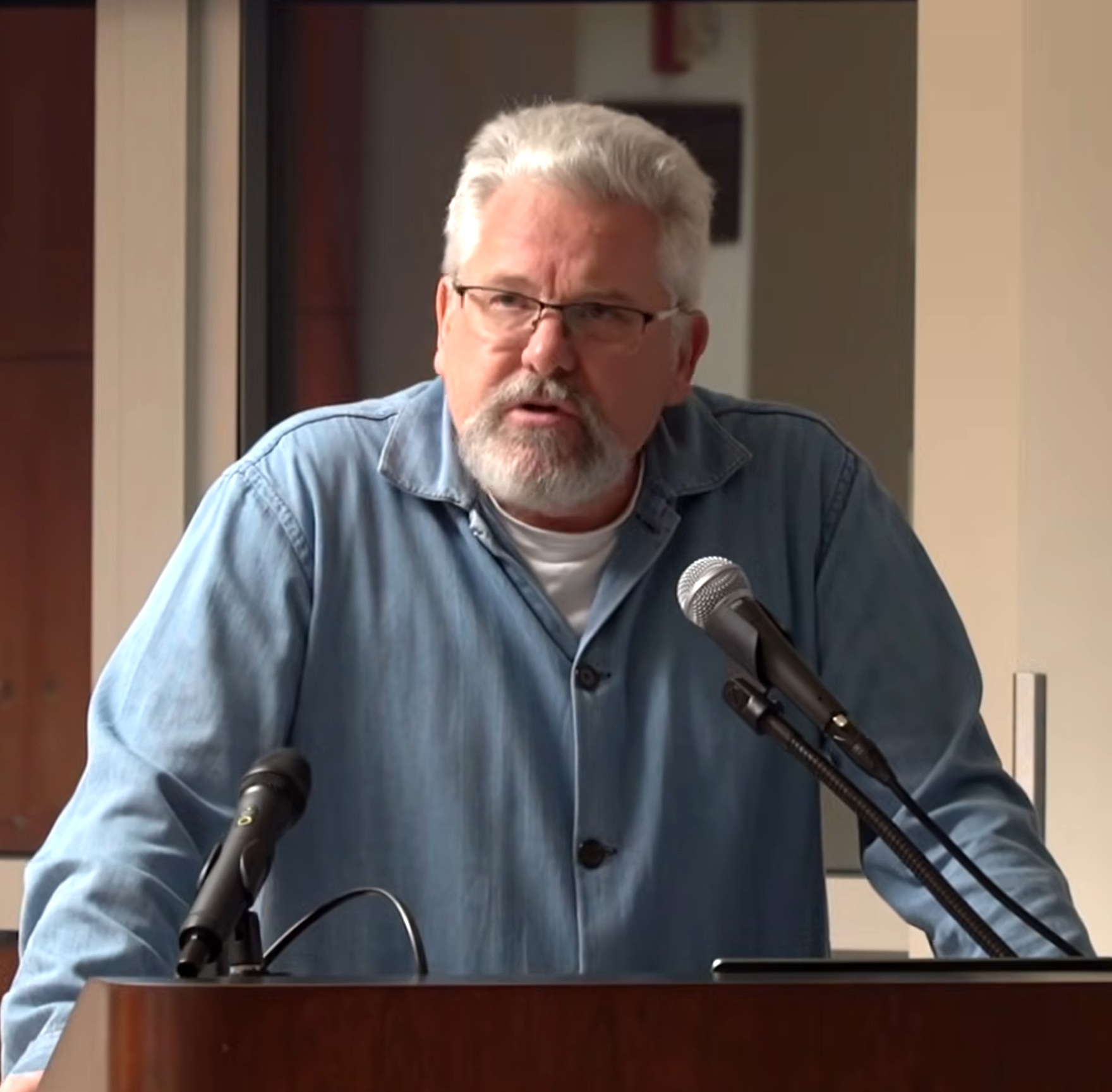
- Born: Carl Johan Elverskog; October 7, 1968 (age 58)

Academic background
- Education: University of California, Berkeley (BA); Indiana University (PhD)
- Thesis: Buddhism, History and Power: The Jewel Translucent Sutra and the Formation of Mongol Identity (2000)
- Doctoral advisor: György Kara

Academic work
- Discipline: History
- Institutions: Southern Methodist University

Carl Johan Elverskog (born October 7, 1968) is a Swedish-American historian. His scholarship focuses on Sino-Inner Asian history during the Ming and Qing periods, the history of Buddhism among Mongolian and Turkic peoples, and environmental history. He is currently a Dedman Family Distinguished Professor and a Professor of Religious Studies at Southern Methodist University.

Elverskog has been praised for his extensive contributions to the study of Asian history and described as "the preeminent English-language translator of Mongolian classics working today." He is the recipient of the American Academy of Religion's 2011 Award for Excellence in the Study of Religion and the Association for Asian Studies' 2026 Joseph Levenson Book Prize (pre-1900 China). He has been a resident fellow at the Center for Advanced Study in the Behavioral Sciences, the National Humanities Center, and twice at the Swedish Collegium for Advanced Study. He was a 2021-2022 Berlin Prize Fellow.

== Education ==
Elverskog received his B.A. from the University of California, Berkeley. He then studied Central Eurasian Studies at Indiana University Bloomington, earning his M.A. in 1995 and his Ph.D. in 2000. A 2011 review of contemporary trends in Mongolian studies in the Chinese-language journal, Mongolian and Tibetan Quarterly, observed that he was "one of the more prominent figures to have graduated from Indiana University with a PhD in Mongolian studies in recent years."

== Career ==
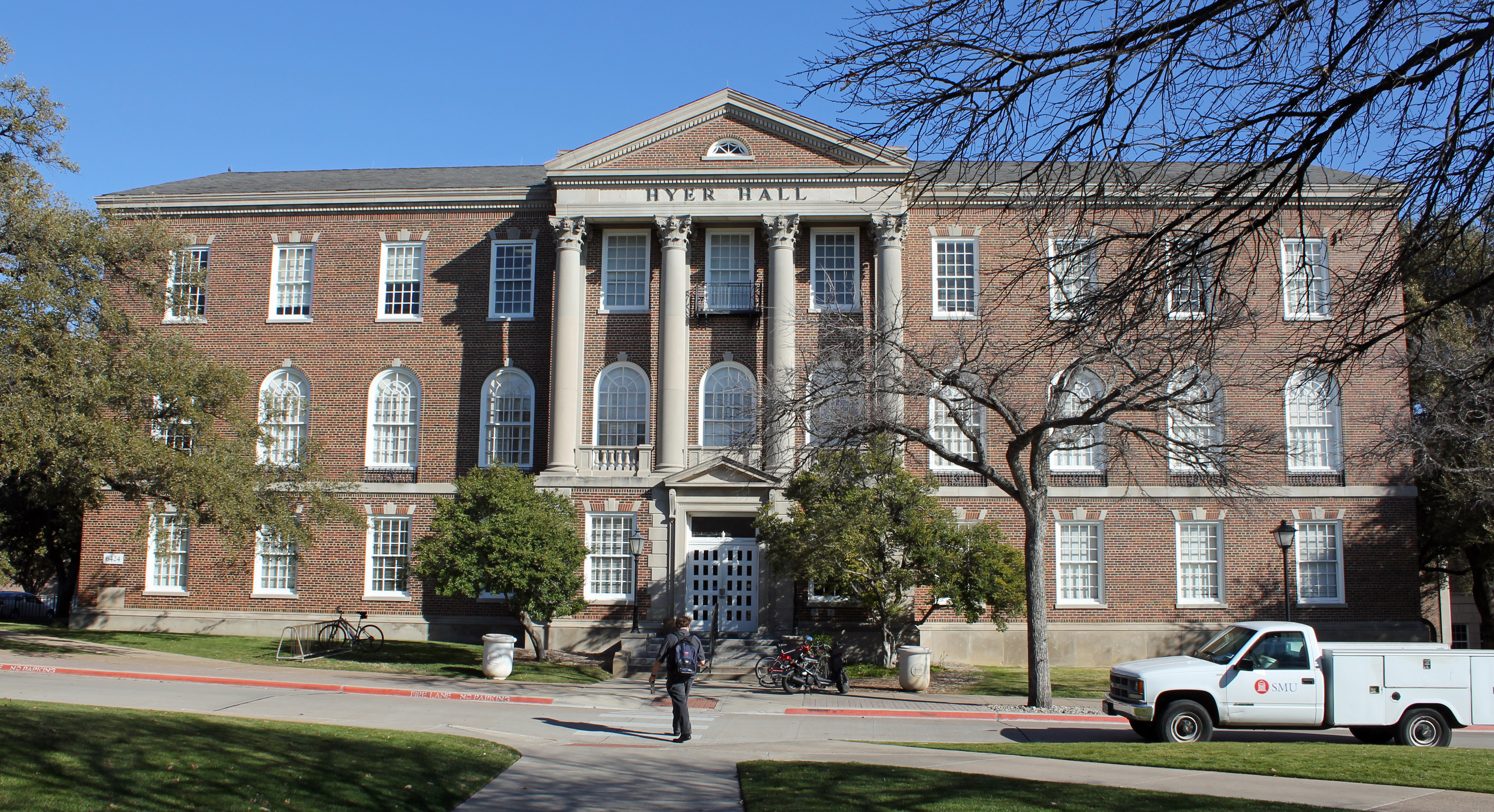
Hyer Hall, home of Religious Studies at SMU

In 2000, Elverskog joined the faculty of the Department of Religious Studies in Dedman College of Humanities and Sciences at Southern Methodist University. He was promoted to Associate Professor in 2006 and Full Professor in 2010.

== Selected bibliography ==
- The Jewel Translucent Sutra: Altan Khan and the Mongols in the Sixteenth Century. Leiden: Brill, 2003.
- Our Great Qing: The Mongols, Buddhism and the State in Late Imperial China. Honolulu: University of Hawaiʻi Press, 2006.
- Buddhism and Islam on the Silk Road. Philadelphia: University of Pennsylvania Press, 2010.
- The Buddha's Footprint: An Environmental History of Asia. Philadelphia: University of Pennsylvania Press, 2020.
- The Precious Summary: A History of the Mongols from Chinggis Khan to the Qing Dynasty. New York: Columbia University Press, 2023.
- A History of Uyghur Buddhism. New York: Columbia University Press, 2024.
