= Journal of Asian History =

- Discipline: Asian history
- Language: English
- Edited by: Dorothee Schaab-Hanke, Achim Mittag

Publication details
- History: 1967–present
- Publisher: Harrassowitz Verlag (Germany)
- Frequency: Biannual

Standard abbreviations
- ISO 4: J. Asian Hist.

Indexing
- ISSN: 0021-910X
- JSTOR: 0021910X
- OCLC no.: 855624815

Links
- Journal homepage; Online archive

The Journal of Asian History is a biannual peer-reviewed academic journal covering Asian history up to 1900. It is published by Harrassowitz Verlag. The journal was established in 1967 and until 2011 edited by Denis Sinor (Indiana University. Later editors included Roderich Ptak (Ludwig-Maximilians-Universität München) and Claudius C. Müller. Since 2015, the editors-in-chief are Dorothee Schaab-Hanke (University of Hamburg) and Achim Mittag (University of Tübingen).

== Abstracting and indexing ==
The journal is abstracted and indexed in:

- Arts and Humanities Citation Index
- Current Contents/Arts & Humanities
- EBSCO databases
- Index Islamicus
- International Bibliography of Periodical Literature
- International Bibliography of the Social Sciences
- ProQuest databases
- Scopus (2002-2018)
