= Robert M. Oppenheim =

American Koreanist

Robert Matthew Oppenheim is an American scholar of Korean studies. He is a professor of Asian studies and anthropology at the University of Texas at Austin.

Oppenheim majored in anthropology at Princeton University, graduating in 1991. He received his Ph.D. (2003) and M.A. (1995) in sociocultural anthropology at the University of Chicago. At the University of Texas, he directed the Center for East Asian Studies from 2011 to 2015. He is the author of the book Kyŏngju Things: Assembling Place (Ann Arbor: University of Michigan Press, 2008).

In 2015, Oppenheim won the Global Korea Award of the Council on Korean Studies at Michigan State University.
