= Department of Central Eurasian Studies, Indiana University Bloomington =

Coordinates: 39°46′32″N 86°10′36″W

Department of Central Eurasian Studies

Location
- Hamilton Lugar School of Global and International Studies, Room 3024, | 355 N. Jordan Ave. (United States) Bloomington, IN

Information
- Type: Public
- Established: 1943
- Chair: Öner Özçelik
- Faculty: 26 full faculty, 7 adjunct
- Campus: Indiana University (Bloomington)
- Information: 812-855-2233
- Website: https://ceus.indiana.edu

The Department of Central Eurasian Studies, often abbreviated as CEUS, is a specialized academic department in the Hamilton Lugar School of Global and International Studies, at the Bloomington campus of Indiana University, in Bloomington, Indiana. Since its original formation in 1943 as a language-training program for the U.S. military, the department has become the sole independent degree-granting academic unit staffed with its own faculty dedicated to Central Eurasia in the country. Due to the department and the presence of several additional centers - the Inner Asian & Uralic National Resource Center, the Denis Sinor Research Institute for Inner Asian Studies, and the Center for Languages of the Central Asian Region - Indiana University currently hosts the premier program of Central Asian studies in the United States.

CEUS is home to many notable scholars of Central Eurasian studies, past and present, including Christopher Beckwith, Yuri Bregel, Jamsheed Choksy, Devin Deweese, William Fierman, György Kara, Nazif Shahrani, Denis Sinor, and Elliot Sperling. The department teaches many less commonly taught languages, including Azerbaijani, Kazakh, Kurdish, Pashto, Tajik, Turkmen, Uyghur, and Uzbek.

== History of the department ==
In 1942, after the entry of the United States into World War II, an Army Specialized Training Program was created to provide training in several Eurasian languages, including Russian, Turkish, Finnish, and Hungarian. As such, the department was founded in 1943 as an "Army Specialized Training Program for Central Eurasian languages". It was formally organized as the Program in Uralic and Altaic Studies in 1956. In 1965 it became the Department of Uralic and Altaic Studies. Since 1993 it has been known under its current name.

Professor Denis Sinor arrived from Cambridge University in the academic year of 1962–63. On his initiative, in 1965, the Program in Uralic and Altaic Studies was recognized as a graduate department. Professor Sinor was appointed the first chairman of the department and he held this position until 1981.

== Degrees and scope of coverage ==
The Department of Central Eurasian Studies offers a Bachelor of Arts, a Master of Arts and a PhD track of study, including a PhD minor. The department's area studies program emphasizes language proficiency and familiarity with indigenous cultures. The degree program requires students to select a language of specialization local to the region and a specific region of specialization within Central Eurasia.

Languages covered are Iranian languages (Kurdish, Pashto, Persian, and Tajik), Mongolian, Semitic languages (Aramaic), Tibetic languages (Standard Tibetan, Old Tibetan), Turkic languages (Azerbaijani, Kazakh, Kyrgyz, modern Turkish and Ottoman Turkish, Uyghur, Uzbek and Chagatai), Uralic languages (Estonian, Finnish, and Hungarian).

The following geographical areas, both political and cultural, are considered to fall within the scope of the department: Afghanistan, Azerbaijan, Buryatia, Estonia, Finland, Hungary, Iran, Kazakhstan, Kyrgyzstan, Mongolia, Tajikistan, Tatarstan, Tibet Autonomous Region of China, Turkmenistan, Turkey, Uzbekistan, Xinjiang Uygur Autonomous Region of China, and Inner Mongolia Autonomous Region of China.

== Affiliated Centers ==
=== Inner Asian & Uralic National Resource Center ===
In 1962, Indiana University became home to the Uralic and Altaic Language and Area Center, which in 1981 was renamed the Inner Asian and Uralic National Resource Center (IAUNRC). It is part of the National Resource Center program, and is funded by a Title VI grant from the U.S. Department of Education, through which it receives approximately $230,000 a year. It scope includes the civilizations of Central Asia, Mongolia, and Tibet, together with neighboring areas and peoples that in certain periods formed cultural, political, or ethnolinguistic unities with these regions. It is the only national resource center focusing on Inner Asia.The center awards FLAS fellowships and engages in outreach and educational activities in the local area and throughout the country.

=== Denis Sinor Research Institute for Inner Asian Studies ===
Established in 1967 as the Asian Studies Research Institute (ASRI), its name was changed to the Research Institute for Inner Asian Studies (RIFIAS) in 1979, and then renamed the Denis Sinor Institute for Inner Asian Studies (SRIFIAS) in 2007. It is an independent, non-profit institution accountable to the Dean of the College of Arts and Sciences of the Bloomington campus of Indiana University. The SRIFIAS has had five directors, all members of the faculty of the Department of Central Eurasian Studies at Indiana University: Denis Sinor (1967–1981), Stephen Halkovic (1982–1985), Yuri Bregel (1986–1997), Devin DeWeese (1997–2007), and Edward Lazzerini (since 2007). The mission of the SRIFIAS is to encourage and support scholarly research in all aspects of Inner Asian Studies. One of the central tasks of the SRIFIAS is to maintain and develop scholarly and technical resources necessary for research in Inner Asian studies.

=== Center for Languages of the Central Asian Region ===
Indiana University's Center for Languages of the Central Asian Region (CeLCAR) is one of fifteen current Language Resource Centers funded by the U.S. Department of Education's Title VI grants. Additional support comes from the College of Arts and Sciences. The goal of CeLCAR is to enhance U.S. national capacity for teaching and learning the languages and cultures of Central Asia and surrounding regions. In 2008 the center was awarded a $100,000 grant from the U.S. Department of Defense to train U.S. government personnel in the history, cultures, and languages of Afghanistan.
