= Records of the Western Regions =

Record of the travels of Buddhist monk Xuanzang

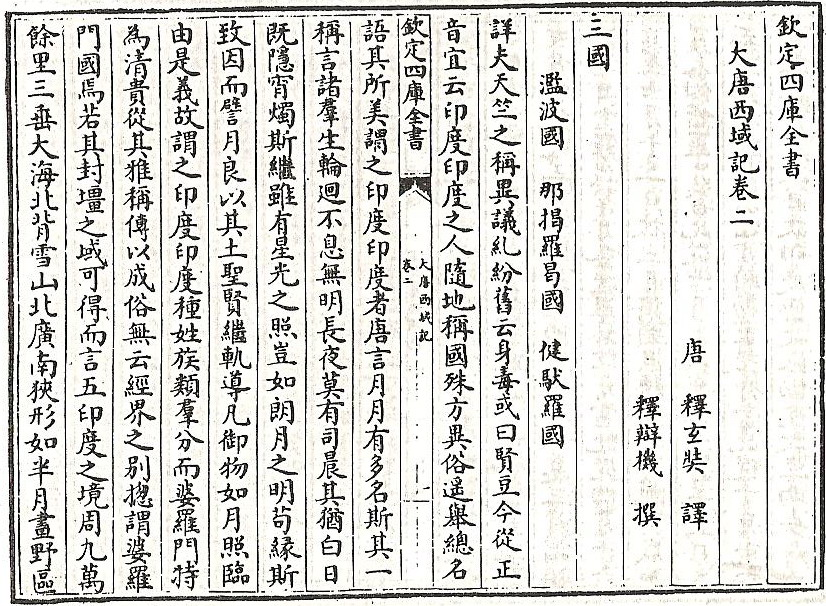
- A page from the edition of the Records of the Western Regions compiled as part of the Siku Quanshu, an 18th-century Qing encyclopedia
- Traditional Chinese: 《大唐西域記》
- Simplified Chinese: 《大唐西域记》
- Literal meaning: Records of the Western Regions during the Great Tang
Transcriptions
Standard Mandarin
- Hanyu Pinyin: Dàtáng Xīyùjì; Dà Táng Xīyùjì; Dàtáng Xīyù Jì; Dà Táng Xīyù Jì
- Wade–Giles: Ta T'ang Hsi-yü Chi

The Records of the Western Regions, also known by its Chinese name as the Datang Xiyuji or Da Tang Xiyu Ji (T 2087) and by various other translations and Romanized transcriptions, is a narrative of the Chinese Buddhist monk Xuanzang's 19 year journey from Tang China through the Western Regions to medieval India and back during the mid-7th century CE.

The book was compiled in 646, describing travels undertaken between 626 and 645. Bianji, a disciple of Xuanzang, spent more than one year editing the book through Xuanzang's dictation. The text presents an account of Xuanzang's route with religious details as well as reports of the people and places he encountered. It is now considered not merely a landmark work in the history of Buddhism and Indo-Chinese relations but also in cross-cultural studies across the world.

Xuanzang's pilgrimage began in the imperial capital of Chang'an (now Xi'an in China's Shaanxi Province) and followed the overland Silk Road through what is now Gansu and Xinjiang in northwest China. He travelled through Central Asia around the Himalayas to India, where he reached as far south as Kanchipuram. He then returned to China where, despite the illegality of his departure, his travels and scholarship were celebrated by the Emperor Taizong of Tang.

== Background ==
While trade relations between India and China had been ongoing from at least the 1st century CE, and had been strengthened through the expansion of Buddhism into China from the time of the Three Kingdoms, it was not until the expansion of the Turkic Khaganate began to threaten the borders of India and China that embassies were sent between the two regions for military alliances. Xuanzang is credited as being one of the first diplomats to establish such a relation between Tang China and the Kingdom of Kannauj.

Xuanzang's travels were motivated by his deep interest in Buddhist lore. While he was not legally authorized by the Tang court to leave China, he managed to journey to India and record his meetings with the kings of various Indian kingdoms. Of particular note is emperor Harsha, whom Xuanzang managed to convince to send an emissary to Emperor Taizong of Tang. These diplomatic relations allowed Xuanzang to return to China without facing legal repercussions, instead granting him an audience with Taizong, who ultimately commissioned Xuanzang to write a record of his journeys to be entered into the official Tang records.

== Overview ==
The book contains more than 120,000 Chinese characters and is divided into twelve volumes, which describe the geography, land and maritime transportation, climate, local products, people, language, history, politics, economic life, religion, culture, and customs in 110 countries, regions and city-states from Xinjiang to Afghanistan, Eastern Iran, Tajikistan, Uzbekistan, Nepal, Northern India, and Sri Lanka, among other regions.

== Legacy ==
The text is of a great value to modern historians and archaeologists. The Records is an important document of Central Asia during the early 7th century, as it provides information of a Buddhist culture existing in Afghanistan during that time and the earliest textual evidence for Buddhist sculptures at Bamiyan. His travels are also credited with being partially responsible for the spread of sugar-making technology in medieval China and India. This is significant because sugar plays a crucial role in Buddhist doctrine. The text also has equal importance in the study of the history of India, and archaeologists have been using it to fill in certain gaps in Indian history. It also allowed historians to locate important archaeological sites in the Indian subcontinent. The book is known for having "exact descriptions of distances and locations of different places", and has served as a guidebook for the excavation of many important sites, such as Rajagrha, the Temple at Sarnath, the Ajanta Caves, the ruins of the Nalanda mahāvihāra (great monastery) in Bihar, and the ruins of Vasu Bihar in the ancient city of Pundra. The text inspired Journey to the West, a Classic Chinese novel published in the Ming dynasty.

== Translations ==
- Beal, Samuel (1884). Si-Yu-Ki: Buddhist Records of the Western World, by Hiuen Tsiang. 2 vols. Translated by Samuel Beal. London. 1884. Reprint: Delhi. Oriental Books Reprint Corporation. 1969. Volume 1 (PDF 21.5 MB) Volume2 (PDF 16.9 MB)
- Beal, Samuel (1911). The Life of Hiuen-Tsiang. Translated from the Chinese of Shaman (monk) Hwui Li by Samuel Beal. London. 1911. Reprint Munshiram Manoharlal, New Delhi. 1973. Internet Archive (PDF 14.3 MB)
- Julien, Stanislas, (1857/1858). Mémoires sur les contrées occidentales, L'Imprimerie impériale, Paris. Vol.1 Vol.2
- Li, Rongxi (translator) (1995). The Great Tang Dynasty Record of the Western Regions. Numata Center for Buddhist Translation and Research. Berkeley, California. ISBN 1-886439-02-8
- Watters, Thomas (1904). On Yuan Chwang's Travels in India, 629-645 A.D. Volume1. Royal Asiatic Society, London. Volume 2
- Sen, Tansen. "In Search of Longevity and Good Karma: Chinese Diplomatic Missions to Middle India in the Seventh Century." Journal of World History, vol. 12, no. 1, 2001, pp. 1–28. JSTOR, JSTOR, www.jstor.org/stable/20078877.
