= Prabhakāramitra =

6th/7th century Indian Buddhist monk

Prabhākaramitra

Personal life
- Born: c. 564 CE Central India
- Died: c. 633 CE China
- Education: Nalanda

Religious life
- Religion: Buddhism
- School: Mahayana

Senior posting
- Teacher: Śīlabhadra

Prabhākaramitra (564–633 CE) (also known as Prabhāmitra) was an Indian Buddhist monk and translator from the monastery of Nalanda who was active in both the Western Turkic Khaganate and Tang China where he was responsible for translating important texts belonging to the Mahayana tradition into Chinese.

Although he has received very little attention from modern scholars, he has been described as "one of medieval China’s most significant Buddhist figures".

== Life ==
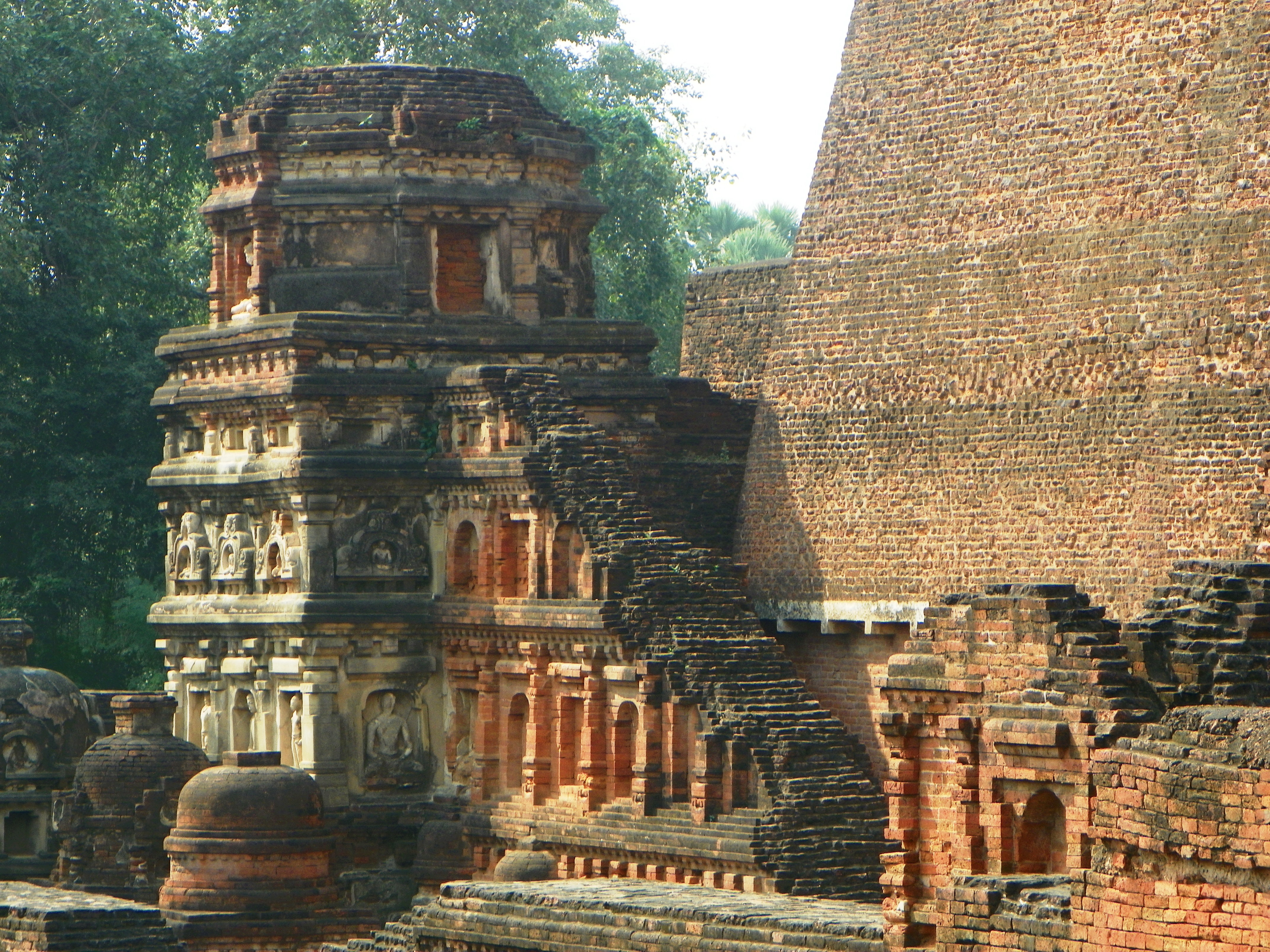
The ruins of Nalanda

Details of Prabhākaramitra's life can be found in multiple sources, most notably the Xu gaoseng zhuan of Daoxuan. Prabhākaramitra was born in Central India in 564 CE into a noble family of high rank. He was ordained as a monk at the monastery of Nalanda at the age of 10 in 574 CE where he was a student of Śīlabhadra who would later go on to teach the Chinese monk, Xuanzang. During his time at Nalanda, he studied not just the sutras of the Mahayana like the Yogācārabhūmi-Śāstra but also texts relating to Hinayana Buddhism and Vedic thought. The biographical material also states that he had three disciples of his own, Prajña, Indra and Varman. Despite the high regard he held in India, receiving a large group of followers and patronage from a local king, he also wished to proselytise Buddhism among the "northern barbarians". Together with a group of 10 followers, which included Buddhists and non-Buddhists, they reached the headquarters of the Western Turkic Khaganate in Tashkend which was at the time ruled by Yehu Khan. He was held in high esteem by the Turks after just 10 days of staying with them with the Khan sending Prabhakāramitra and his followers sending food every morning and offerings every evening. He was likely the first person to have taught Buddhism to the Khan and as a result convinced Yehu Khan to support Buddhism. The Khan also granted Prabhakaramitra material supplies on his journey.

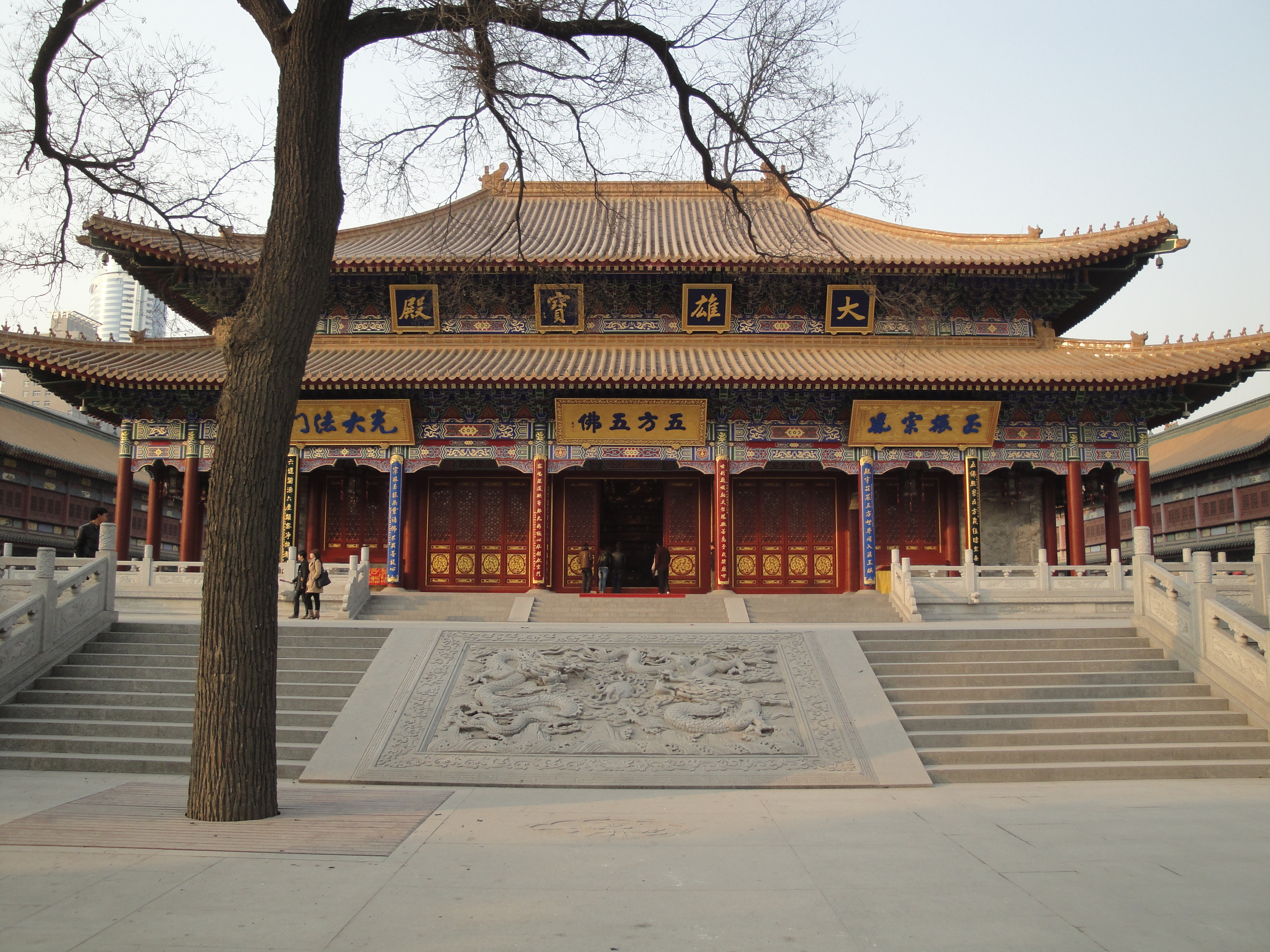
The Mahavira hall at Daxingshan Temple

There is uncertainty as to the exact year that he arrived in China although some scholars state it to be around 626/627 CE. Around this time, an envoy, Prince Gaoping of Tang, was sent to the Western Turks and encountered Prabhākaramitra. Impressed by his knowledge, he wished to bring Prabhākaramitra back with him to China. Once in China, he was ordered by Emperor Taizong of Tang in 629 CE to translate Mahayana scriptures into Chinese. He carried out his work at Daxingshan Temple and Xiantong Temple and was assisted by 19 monk-scholars. It is possible that Xuanzang learned of Nalanda through his interactions with Prabhākaramitra during this time which may have been a motivating factor in wanting to travel there.

His biography states that his continuing work in translating Buddhist texts prompted the ire of Confucian Scholar-officials who spoke negatively of Prabhākaramitra to the Emperor. The result of this was that the Emperor ceased to take an interest in the translation project. By 633, Prabhakaramitra began to fall ill and realised that he would soon die. He began to practice meditation by visualising the Buddha while also distributing his belongings to the Guangsheng Temple where he was staying. He died the same year at the age of 69 and the royal family ordered his body to be cremated at a mountain and a stupa was built to house his relics.

== Translation work ==
Prabhākaramitra was considered a pioneer of the "team-based translation model" for Buddhist scriptures. This involved selecting translators based on skill and under the previous Sui dynasty, "Eight Preconditions" were introduced which set out the essential skills for Buddhist translators however Prabhākaramitra selected his team based on those who possed specific moral qualities and "great virtue" in addition to knowledge of Buddhism and familiarity with scriptures. A selection process was used to select the final nineteen members of the team. The names of some of the other translators that he worked with include Huicheng慧乘, Xuanmo 玄謨, Huiming慧明 and Falin.

The prominent texts translated by Prabhākaramitra and his team from Sanskrit into Chinese were:

- Ratnaketuparivarta 寶星陀羅尼經
- Mūlamadhyamakakārikā 般若燈論釋
- Mahāyānasūtrālaṃkāra 大乘莊嚴經論
- Prajñāpradīpa

Prabhākaramitra's model for translation marked a significant shift in how translations were carried out in medieval China. The model refined the role of the translator introducing more organisation and procedures. Prabhākaramitra later advocated for large-scale translation teams that were prominent in the Qin dynasty in the early medieval period and saw the involvement of up to 3000 translators which helped with the spread of Buddhist texts in the early medieval period. However, his proposal was criticised by contemporaries in the Tang court who believed that this was an attempt for Prabhākaramitra to extend his own influence and seek disciples. Amid the public criticism, Prabhākaramitra's proposals were ignored.

== Sources ==
- Siu, Sai Yau (2024). The Evolution of Team-Based Buddhist Scripture Translation in Tang China. Springer. ISBN 9789819722938.
