= Bhadra dynasty =

Former royal house of Samatata

The Bhadra dynasty (Bengali: ভদ্র রাজবংশ) was a Bengali royal house which had reigned over the kingdom of Samatata, located in what is present-day Bangladesh and Eastern India.

Of Brahmin origin, their rule flourished during the first half of the 7th century, though little is known about their history. The kings of the dynasty bore names with the suffix "Bhadra", leading to suggestions of familial links with the vassal chiefs Samanta Narayanabhadra and Jyeshthabhadra, who find mention in the Vappaghosavata grant of Jayanaga and the Nidhanpur grant of Bhaskaravarman respectively. Deddadevi, the wife of the first Pala emperor Gopala I and mother to his successor Dharmapala, is believed to have been the daughter of a Bhadra monarch. Additionally, the Chinese traveller Xuanzang described Śīlabhadra, a prominent scholar at Nalanda Monastery, as being a scion of this family.

In relation to the latter, the historian P. L. Paul suggests that the "Bhadra" name only became associated with the dynasty as a result of the fame of Śīlabhadra. Paul posits that the family were in fact identical to the Khadga dynasty, who ruled Samatata during the remainder of the 7th century. Alternatively, it may be that the Bhadras were overthrown by the latter.
