= Śīlabhadra =

Indian Buddhist monk and philosopher

Personal life
- Born: c. 529 CE
- Died: c. 645 CE
- Education: Nālandā

Religious life
- Religion: Buddhism
- School: Mahayana

Senior posting
- Teacher: Dharmapāla of Nālandā
- Students: Xuanzang; Prabhakāramitra

Śīlabhadra (traditional Chinese: 戒賢; ; pinyin: Jièxián) (529–645) was a Buddhist monk and philosopher. He is best known as being an abbot of Nālandā monastery in India, as being an expert on Yogācāra teachings, and for being the personal tutor of the Chinese Buddhist monk Xuanzang. Another notable student of his was Prabhakāramitra.

== Biography ==
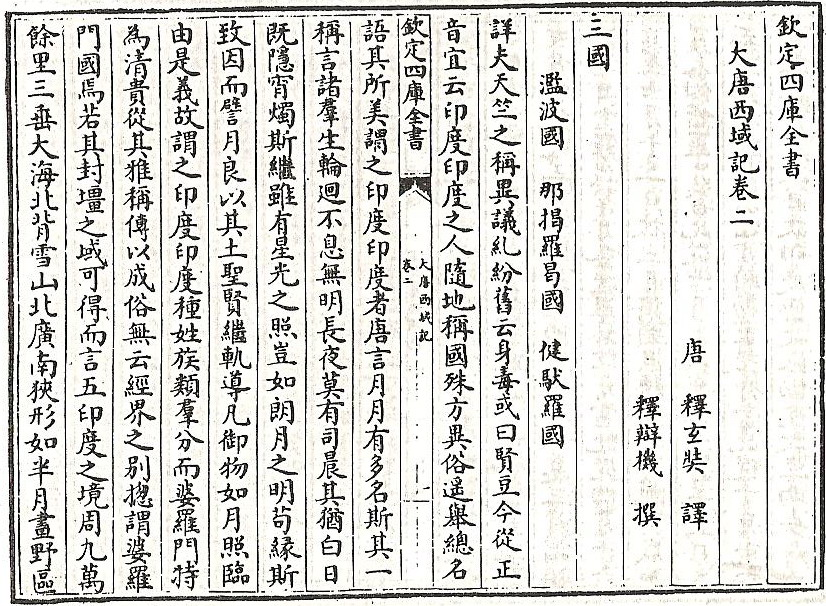
A page from the Great Tang Records on the Western Regions, a text widely used for its accurate descriptions of 7th century India

=== Early life ===
Śīlabhadra was said to have originally been from Magadha. Although another source states that he "appears to have been born in a Brahman royal family of Samatata", identified through Xuanzang's accounts as being the Bhadra dynasty. As a young man, Śīlabhadra went to Nālandā, and was trained there by Dharmapāla of Nālandā, who also ordained him as a Buddhist monk. According to Xuanzang's account, Śīlabhadra gradually became famous for his learning even in foreign countries. At 30 years old, after defeating a Brahmin from southern India in a religious debate, the king insisted on giving him the revenue of a city, which Śīlabhadra accepted with reluctance, and he built a monastery there and kept it funded with the city's revenues. The name of this monastery was Śīlabhadra Vihāra.

=== Śīlabhadra and Xuanzang ===
At the age of 33, the Chinese Buddhist monk Xuanzang made a journey to India in order to study Buddhism there and to procure Buddhist texts for translation into Chinese. Xuanzang spent over ten years in India travelling and studying under various Buddhist masters. These masters included Śīlabhadra, the abbot of Nālandā monastery, who was then 106 years old. Śīlabhadra is described as being very old at this time and highly revered by the monks:

He was then very old, his nephew Buddhabhadra being 70 years of age. The pilgrim was met by twenty grave-looking monks, who introduced him to their chief, the venerable "Treasure of the True Law," whose proper name of Śīlabhadra they did not dare to pronounce. Xuanzang advanced towards him according to the established etiquette on his elbows and knees, a custom which is still preserved in Burma under the name of Shikoh.

Xuanzang records the number of teachers at Nālandā as being around 1510. Of these, approximately 1000 were able to explain 20 collections of sūtras and śāstras, 500 were able to explain 30 collections, and only 10 teachers were able to explain 50 collections. Xuanzang was among the few who were able to explain 50 collections or more. At this time, only the abbot Śīlabhadra had studied all the major collections of sūtras and śāstras at Nālandā.

Xuanzang was tutored in the Yogācāra teachings by Śīlabhadra for several years at Nālandā. Upon his return from India, Xuanzang brought with him a wagon-load of Buddhist texts, including important Yogācāra works such as the Yogācārabhūmi-śastra. In total, Xuanzang had procured 657 Buddhist texts from India. Upon his return to China, he was given government support and many assistants for the purpose of translating these texts into Chinese.

== Teachings ==
According to the Indian translator Divākara, Śīlabhadra divided the Buddhist teachings into three turnings of the Dharma Wheel, following the divisions given in the Saṃdhinirmocana Sūtra:

1. In the first turning, the Buddha taught the Four Noble Truths at Vārāṇasī for those in the śravaka vehicle. It is described as marvellous and wonderful, but requiring interpretation and occasioning controversy. The doctrines of the first turning are exemplified in the Dharmacakra Pravartana Sūtra. This turning represents the earliest phase of the Buddhist teachings and the earliest period in the history of Buddhism.
2. In the second turning, the Buddha taught the Mahāyāna teachings to the bodhisattvas, teaching that all phenomena have no-essence, no arising, no passing away, are originally quiescent, and essentially in cessation. This turning is also described as marvellous and wonderful, but requiring interpretation and occasioning controversy. Doctrine of the second turning is established in the Prajñāpāramitā teachings, first put into writing around 100 BCE. In Indian philosophical schools, it is exemplified by the Mādhyamaka school of Nāgārjuna.
3. In the third turning, the Buddha taught similar teachings to the second turning, but for everyone in the three vehicles, including all the śravakas, pratyekabuddhas, and bodhisattvas. These were meant to be completely explicit teachings in their entire detail, for which interpretations would not be necessary, and controversy would not occur. These teachings were established by the Saṃdhinirmocana Sūtra as early as the 1st or 2nd century CE. In the Indian philosophical schools, the third turning is exemplified by the Yogācāra school of Asaṅga and Vasubandhu.

Śīlabhadra considered the teachings from the third turning (Yogācāra) to be the highest form of Buddhism, because it fully explains the three natures, but the Mādhyamaka teacher Jñānaprabha notably opposed this idea. Instead, Jñānaprabha regarded Yogācāra teachings to be below Mādhyamaka, because they (purportedly) posit the real existence of a mind.

Śīlabhadra composed the text Buddhabhūmivyākhyāna, which is now extant only in the Tibetan language.
