= Khadga dynasty =

Buddhist dynasty in Bengal (625–716)

- 625 CE–716 CE
- Capital: Karmanta Vasaka (present-day Barakamata, Comilla district)
- Religion: Buddhism
- Government: Monarchy
- Raja
  - 625–640: Khadgodyama (first)
  - 716–?: Udirnakhadga (last)
- Historical era: Classical period
  - Established: 625 CE
  - Disestablished: 716 CE
Preceded by	Succeeded by
Gauda Kingdom; Bhadra dynasty	Deva Dynasty; Pala Empire
- Today part of: Bangladesh; India

Khadga dynasty (Bengali: [kʰɔɽɡo rad͡ʒbɔŋʃo]), was a Buddhist dynasty which ruled the areas of Vanga and Samatata in ancient Bengal from 625 CE to 716 CE. Chronologically, the dynasty emerged as a powerful kingdom of Bengal between the fall of Gauda Kingdom and the rise of the Pala Empire. Their ascendancy may have been immediately preceded by the overthrow of a previously ruling Bhadra dynasty. While they did not assume imperial titles, the Khadgas retained sovereignty over the ancient kingdom of Vanga and later conquered Samatata. It was succeeded by the 8th-9th century Buddhist Deva dynasty.

== List of rulers ==
Titular Name	Reign	Notes
Khadgodyama (খড়্গোদ্যম)	625–640	Father of Jatakhadga
Jatakhadga (জাতখড়্গ)	640–658	Father of Devakhadga
Devakhadga (দেবখড়্গ)	658–673	Queen Prabhavati (প্রভাবতী)
Rajabhatta (রাজভট্ট)	673–707	Son of Devakhadga
Balabhatta (বলভট্ট)	707–716	Son of Devakhadga
Udirnakhadga (উদীর্ণখড়্গ)	??	
