= Samatata =

Ancient geopolitical division and kingdom of Bengal

Coordinates: 23.5°N 91.0°E

Samataṭa
- 4th century CE–13th century CE
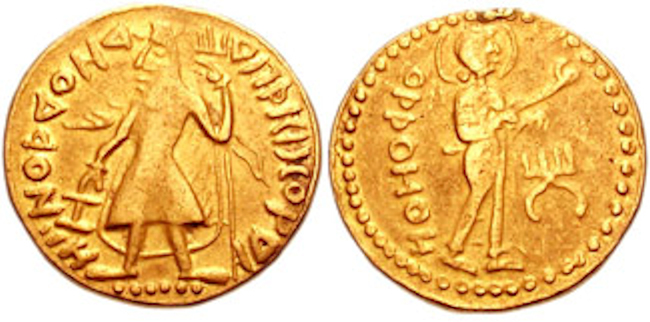
- Samatata coinage of Vira Jadamarah, imitative of the Kushan coinage of Kanishka I. The text of the legend is a meaningless imitation, c. 3rd century CE.

- Samataṭa and erstwhile states of ancient India in 375 CE
- Common languages: Magadhan Prakrit, Old Bengali, Sanskrit
- Religion: Hinduism, Jainism, Buddhism
- Government: Monarchy
- Recorded dynasties
  - 3rd century-6th century: Chandra dynasty (as vassals of Gupta Empire)
  - 6th century-7th century: Gauda Kingdom
  - 7th century-8th century: Khadga dynasty and Bhadra dynasty
  - 8th century-9th century: First Deva dynasty
  - 9th century-10th century: Chandra dynasty (continued)
  - 10th century-11th century: Varman Dynasty
  - 11th century-12th century: Sena dynasty
  - 12th century-13th century: Second Deva dynasty
- History
  - Established: 4th century CE
  - Disestablished: 13th century CE
Preceded by
Vanga Kingdom
Succeeded by
Gauda Kingdom
Pala Empire
Sena Dynasty

Samataṭa (Brahmi script: sa-ma-ta-ṭa) was an ancient geopolitical division of Bengal in the eastern Indian subcontinent. The Greco-Roman account of Sounagoura is linked to the kingdom of Samatata. Its territory corresponded to much of present-day eastern and southern Bangladesh (particularly Dhaka division, Barisal division, Sylhet Division, Khulna Division and Chittagong Division) and the undivided 24 Parganas district in southern West Bengal. The area covers the trans-Meghna part of the Bengal delta. It was a centre of Buddhist civilisation before the resurgence of Hinduism, and Muslim conquest in the region.

Archaeological evidence in the Wari-Bateshwar ruins, particularly punch-marked coins, indicate that Vanga-Samataṭa region was probably a province of the Mauryan Empire. However, the 4th-century CE Allahabad pillar inscriptions of the Indian emperor Samudragupta is the earliest reference of Samataṭa in which it is described as a tributary state. Before this, no trace of Samataṭa is found in records.

Samataṭa gained prominence as an important region of Bengal during the reigns of the Gauda Kingdom, Khadga dynasty, First Deva dynasty, Chandra dynasty and Varman dynasty between the 6th and 11th centuries. During this period, the rulers of Samataṭa also reigned over parts of Arakan, Tripura and Kamarupa. Chinese travellers provide an elaborate description of the region in the 7th century. According to Alexander Cunningham, Jessore was the capital of Samatata. Xuanzang of China visited the region in 630s.

Records of the Sena dynasty include mention of Samataṭa as a haven for Sena kings who escaped the Muslim conquest of western Bengal during the 13th century. The area was eventually absorbed by the forces of the Delhi Sultanate.

== Names ==
Samataṭa has been described by various similar names, including Samatat/Samata/Saknat/Sankat/Sankanat.In Sanskrit, sama means equal and taṭa means coast or shore.

== Geography ==
On the basis of the evidence provided by inscriptions, Chinese writings, and archaeological evidence, it can be deduced that Samatata covered the trans-Meghna territories. It included areas along the banks of the Meghna River and its tributaries; including the modern districts of Bengal region such as Sylhet, Maulvi Bazar, Habiganj, Sunamganj, Narsingdi, Narayanganj, Dhaka, Munshiganj, Brahmanbaria, Chandpur, Comilla, Noakhali, Jessore, Feni, Barisal, Khulna district, Lakshmipur, North 24 Parganas and South 24 Parganas. It included the Bangladeshi Channel Islands of Hatia and Sandwip; as well as the islands of Bhola, Maheshkhali, Kutubdia and St. Martin's. It included parts of Tripura (in present-day Northeast India), Bangladesh's Chittagong and Cox's Bazar districts; and northern Arakan (present-day Rakhine State, Myanmar). Samatata's erstwhile neighbours included the geopolitical divisions of Vanga (Southwest Bengal), Pundravardhana (North Bengal), and parts of Kamarupa (historical Assam).

== History ==
Location on the Samatatas and contemporary South Asian polities circa 350 CE.

The Roman geographer Ptolemy wrote about a trading post called Souanagoura in the eastern part of the Ganges-Brahmaputra delta. The archaeologist Sufi Mostafizur Rahman believes the riverside citadel in the Wari-Bateshwar ruins was the city-state of Sounagoura. According to Ptolemy, Sounagoura was located on the bank of the Brahmaputra River and was an "emporium", which is a term used by the Roman Empire to refer to a trading colony set up by Roman merchants. The Brahmaputra River flowed down from the Himalayas and to the east of Wari-Bateshwar before joining the Meghna River on its way to the Bay of Bengal. Ptolemy's account places Sounagoura near the old course of the Brahmaputra River. The Brahmaputra changed its course following an earthquake in 1783. Excavations in Wari-Bateshwar reveal an urban and monetary civilisation since the pre-Mauryan period. Archaeologist and historian Dilip Kumar Chakrabarti also considers Wari-Bateshwar to be a part of the trans-Meghna region. In a book edited by Patrick Olivelle, Chakrabarti states "It appears that Wari-Bateshwar belongs to the Samatata tract. Till now this is the only early historic site reported from this tract, but the very fact that it existed as early as the mid-fifth century BCE in this part of Bangladesh shows the geographical unit of Samatata, although inscriptionally documented in the fourth century CE, has a much earlier antiquity which touches the Mahajanapada period. Secondly, on the basis of the fact that Wari-Bateshwar is a fortified settlement, we argue that in addition to its character as a manufacturing and trading center, it was also an administrative center and most likely to be the ancient capital of the Samatata region".

Soon after the death of emperor Ashoka, the Mauryan Empire declined and the eastern part of Bengal became the state of Samatata. The rulers of the erstwhile state remain unknown. During the Gupta Empire, the Indian emperor Samudragupta recorded Samatata as a "frontier kingdom" which paid an annual tribute. This was recorded by Samudragupta's inscription on the Allahabad pillar, which states the following in lines 22–23.

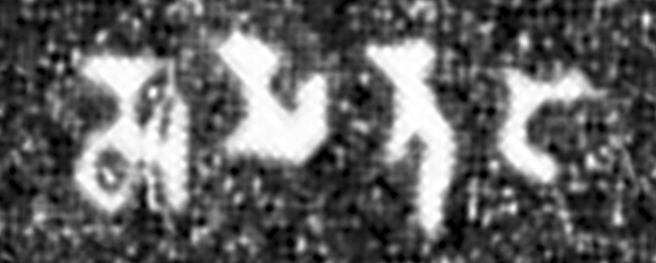
The name "Samataṭa" in later Brahmi script, in the Allahabad Pillar inscription of Samudragupta (350–375 CE).

"Samudragupta, whose formidable rule was propitiated with the payment of all tributes, execution of orders and visits (to his court) for obeisance by such frontier rulers as those of Samataṭa, Ḍavāka, Kāmarūpa, Nēpāla, and Kartṛipura, and, by the Mālavas, Ārjunāyanas, Yaudhēyas, Mādrakas, Ābhīras, Prārjunas, Sanakānīkas, Kākas, Kharaparikas and other nations"

— Lines 22–23 of the Allahabad pillar inscription of Samudragupta (r.c.350-375 CE).

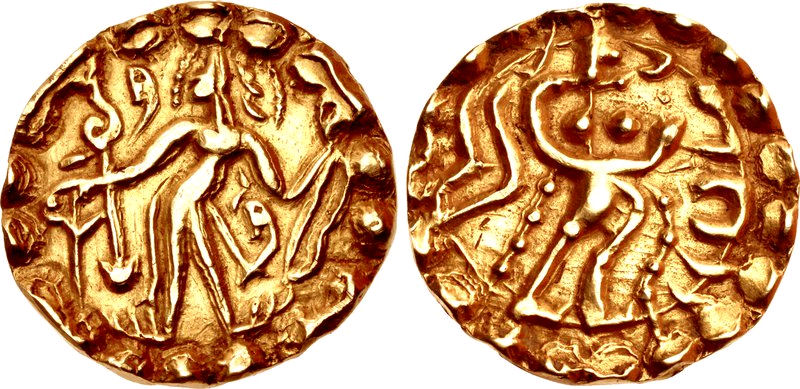
Coin of Ratas Sridharanarata of the Samatata dynasty, circa 664–675 CE.

Samatata's recorded independent dynasties are the Gauda, Bhadra, Khadga, Deva, Chandra and Varman dynasties. The Khadgas were originally from Vanga but later conquered Samatata. A Chinese account of the Khadga king Rajabhatta places the royal capital of Karmanta-vasaka (identified with Barakamata village in Comilla) in Samatata. After the Khadgas, the Devas gained power and started ruling over the kingdom from their capital Devaparvata (identified with Kotbari area in Mainamati near Comilla City. The Devas were devout Buddhists and constructed many temples, muras and vihara in Devaparvata including Shalban Vihara, Ananda Vihara, Bhoj Vihara, Itakhola Mura, Rupban Mura etc. They were succeeded by the Chandras, who were also an important Buddhist dynasty and ruled over Samatata, Vanga and Arakan (Burma). The Chandras were powerful enough to withstand the Pala Empire to the northwest.

Samatata was a flourishing centre of Buddhism. As devout Tantric Buddhists, the Devas and the Chandras established their religious and administrative centre in the archaeological site of Mainamati. The Chandras were also notable for seafaring networks. The ports of Samatata were linked to ports in present-day Myanmar, Thailand, Indonesia and Vietnam. The Chandras may have played a role in the spread of Mahayana Buddhism in Southeast Asia. Bronze sculptures may have been imported by Java from Samatata. The Srivijaya Empire's embassies to the Pala court may have passed through the ports of southeastern Bengal. Arab accounts also note trade routes with Orissa and Sri Lanka. 10th century shipwrecks in Indonesia provide evidence of maritime contact with Bengal.

Samatata continued to play an important role in the history of the region until the 13th century. During the Muslim conquest of Bengal, Samatata served as the last refuge of the Sena kings. Its decline coincided with the decline of Buddhism in India.

== Silk Road and Chinese accounts ==
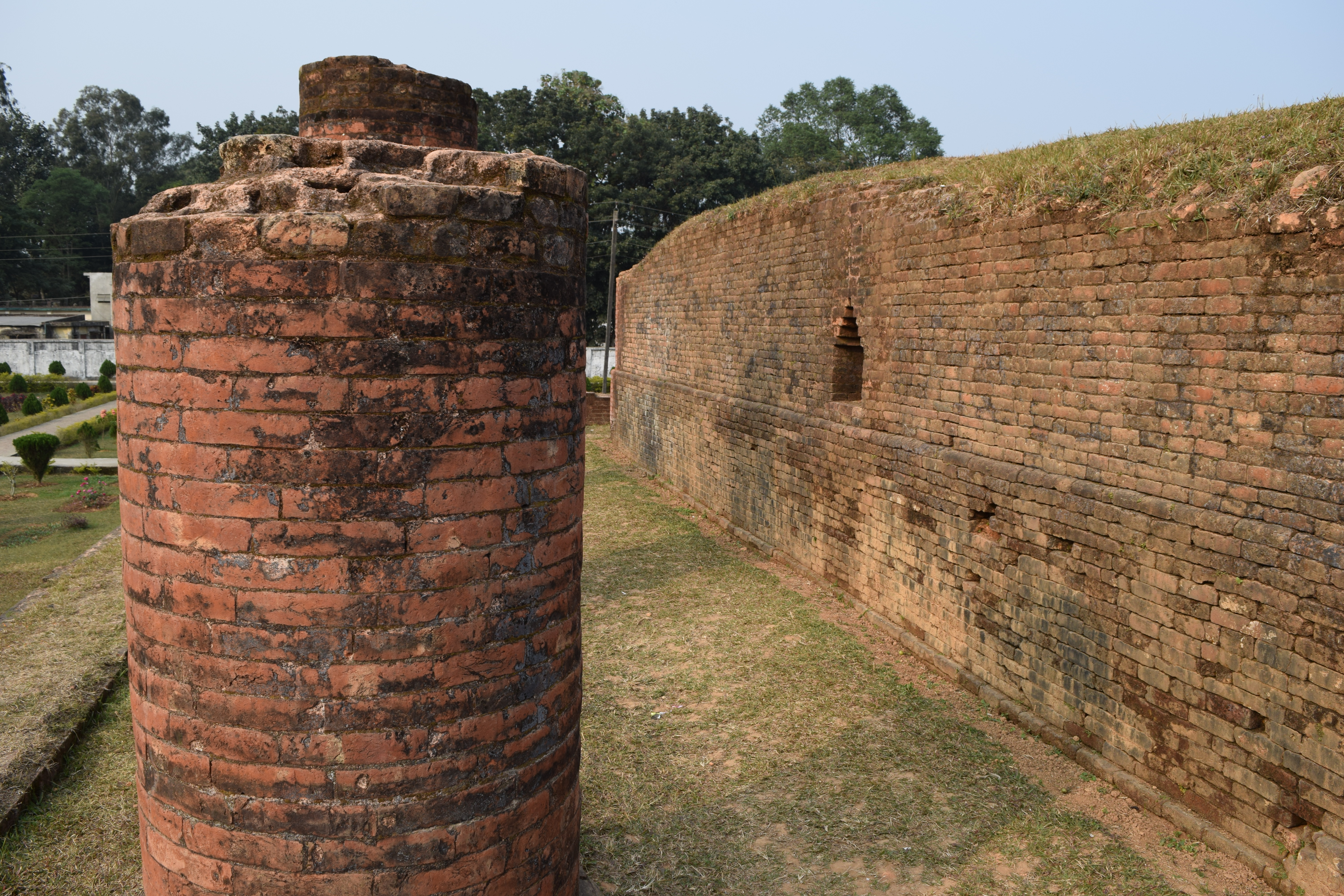
Ruins of a pillar and building in Mainamati

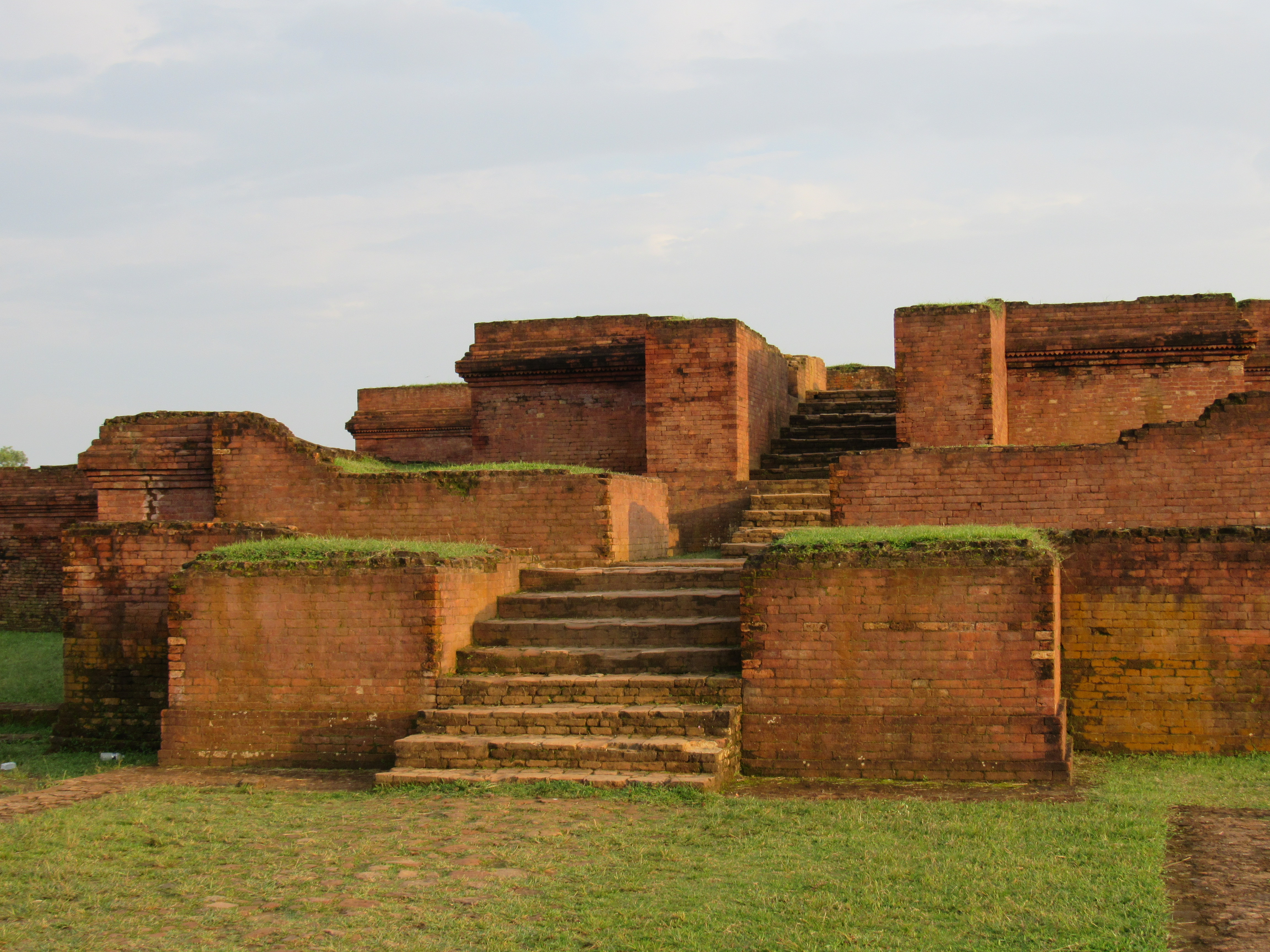
Ruins of the Shalban monastery

The Chinese pilgrim and traveller Xuanzang, who made his way across the Silk Road from northern China into the subcontinent through present-day Afghanistan, Pakistan, India and Bangladesh; visited Samatata at the end of his journey in ancient India. He called the kingdom San-mo-ta-ch'a. Xuanzang found 30 Buddhist monasteries with 2000 monks in Samatata. Xuanzang also provided descriptions of the regions' geography, including the harbour of Chittagong and nearby Burmese kingdoms. A later Chinese traveller Yijing observed that there were 4000 Buddhist monks and nuns in Samatata.

== Epigraphy and archaeology ==
=== Epigraphs ===
- Allahabad pillar inscription of the Gupta dynasty (4th century)
- Copperplate of Shridharana Rata
- Khadga copperplates
- Chandra copperplates
- Mehar copperplate of Damodaradeva

=== Associated archaeological sites ===
- Wari-Bateshwar ruins
- Mainamati
- Waithali

== See also ==
- Indo-Roman trade
