= Xuanzang =

Chinese Buddhist monk and scholar (602–664)

- 玄奘
- 14th-century painting of Xuanzang – Japan, Kamakura period

Personal life
- Born: 6 April 602 Luoyang, Sui dynasty
- Died: 5 February 664 (aged 61) Tongchuan, Tang dynasty
- Era: Tang dynasty
- Notable work: Great Tang Records on the Western Regions
- Education: Jingtu Monastery; Nalanda
- Occupation: Buddhist monk; scholar; translator; pilgrim; traveller

Religious life
- Religion: Buddhism
- Denomination: Mahayana
- School: East Asian Yogācāra
- Dharma name: Mokṣadeva
- Monastic name: Xuanzang

Senior posting
- Teacher: Śīlabhadra
- Students: Kuiji

Xuanzang

Chinese name
- Chinese: 玄奘
Transcriptions
Standard Mandarin
- Hanyu Pinyin: Xuánzàng
- Wade–Giles: Hsüan^{2}-tsang^{4}
- IPA: [ɕɥɛ̌n.tsâŋ]
Wu
- Romanization: Yeu-tsaõ
Hakka
- Romanization: Hian2-tsong4
Yue: Cantonese
- Yale Romanization: Yùhnjohng
- Jyutping: Jyun4-zong6
- IPA: [jyn˩ tsɔŋ˨]
Southern Min
- Tâi-lô: Hiân-tsòng
Middle Chinese
- Middle Chinese: ɣwen-dzáng

Chen Hui (Note: There is some dispute over the Chinese character for Xuanzang's given name at birth. Historical records provide two different characters, 褘 and 禕, with different pronunciations: Huī and Yī respectively.)
- Traditional Chinese: 陳褘
- Simplified Chinese: 陈袆
Transcriptions
Standard Mandarin
- Hanyu Pinyin: Chén Huī
- Wade–Giles: Chʻen^{2} Hui^{1}

Second alternative Chinese name
- Traditional Chinese: 陳禕
- Simplified Chinese: 陈祎
Transcriptions
Standard Mandarin
- Hanyu Pinyin: Chén Yī
- Wade–Giles: Chʻen^{2} I^{1}

Sanskrit name
- Sanskrit: मोक्षदेवः

Xuanzang (Chinese: 玄奘; Wade–Giles: Hsüen Tsang; [ɕɥɛ̌n.tsâŋ]; 6 April 602 – 5 February 664), born Chen Hui or Chen Yi (陳褘 / 陳禕), also known by his Sanskrit Dharma name Mokṣadeva, was a 7th-century Chinese Buddhist monk, scholar, traveller, and translator. He is known for the epoch-making contributions to Chinese Buddhism, the travelogue of his journey to the Indian subcontinent in 629–645, his efforts to bring at least 657 Indian texts to China, and his translations of some of these texts. He was only able to translate 75 distinct sections of a total of 1,335 chapters, but his translations included some of the most important Mahayana scriptures.

Xuanzang was born on 6 April 602 in Chenliu, near present-day Luoyang, in Henan province of China. As a boy, he took to reading religious books, and studying the ideas therein with his father. Like his elder brother, he became a student of Buddhist studies at Jingtu monastery. Xuanzang was ordained as a śrāmaṇera (novice monk) at the age of thirteen. Due to the political and social unrest caused by the fall of the Sui dynasty, he went with his brother 300 miles south to Chengdu in the current-day province of Sichuan, where he was ordained as a bhikṣu (full monk) at the age of twenty, studying Buddhist texts and practices at the monastery.

He later travelled throughout China in search of sacred books of Buddhism. At length, he came to Chang'an, then under the peaceful rule of Emperor Taizong of Tang, where Xuanzang developed the desire to visit India. He knew about Faxian's visit to India and, like him, was concerned about the incomplete and misinterpreted nature of the Buddhist texts that had reached China. He was also concerned about the competing Buddhist theories in variant Chinese translations. He sought original untranslated Sanskrit texts from India to help resolve some of these issues.

At age 27, he began his seventeen-year overland journey to India. He defied his nation's ban on travel abroad, making his way through central Asian cities such as Khotan to India. He visited, among other places, the famed Nalanda University in modern-day Bihar, India, where he studied with the monk Śīlabhadra. He departed from India with numerous Sanskrit texts on a caravan of twenty packhorses. His return was welcomed by Emperor Taizong in China, who encouraged him to write a travelogue.

This Chinese travelogue, titled the Records of the Western Regions, is a notable source about Xuanzang, and also for scholarship on 7th-century India and Central Asia. His travelogue is a mix of the implausible, the hearsay and a firsthand account. Selections from it are used, and disputed, as a terminus ante quem of 645 for events, names and texts he mentions. His text in turn provided the inspiration for the novel Journey to the West written by Wu Cheng'en during the Ming dynasty, around nine centuries after Xuanzang's death.

== Names ==
Common names used for Xuanzang include:

- Xuanzang (Chinese: 玄奘; pinyin: Xuánzàng; Cantonese Yale: Yùhnjohng; Wade–Giles: Hsüan-tsang; Japanese pronunciation: Genjō; Korean pronunciation: Hyeonjang; Vietnamese: Huyền Trang, McCune–Reischauer: Hyŏnjang.)
- Tang Dynasty Tripiṭaka Master (Chinese: 唐三藏; pinyin: Táng Sānzàng; Cantonese Yale: Tòhng Sāamjohng; Wade–Giles: T‘ang San-tsang; Japanese pronunciation: Tō-Sanzō; Korean pronunciation: Dang-samjang; Vietnamese: Đường Tam Tạng, McCune–Reischauer: Tang-samjang.)
- Tripiṭaka Master Xuanzang (Chinese: 玄奘三藏; pinyin: Xuánzàng Sānzàng; Cantonese Yale: Yùhnjohng Sāamjohng; Wade–Giles: Hsüan-tsang San-tsang; Japanese pronunciation: Genjō-sanzō; Korean pronunciation: Hyeonjang-samjang; Vietnamese: Huyền Trang Tam Tạng, McCune–Reischauer: Hyŏnjang-samjang.)
- Great Master Xuanzang (traditional Chinese: 玄奘大師; simplified Chinese: 玄奘大师; pinyin: Xuánzàng Dàshī; Cantonese Yale: Yùhnjohng Daaihsī; Wade–Giles: Hsüan-tsang Ta-shih; Japanese pronunciation: Genjō-daishi; Korean pronunciation: Hyeonjang-daesa; Vietnamese: Huyền Trang Đại Sư, McCune–Reischauer: Hyŏnjang-taesa.)
- Tang Dynasty Monk (Chinese: 唐僧; pinyin: Táng Sēng; Cantonese Yale: Tòhng Jāng; Wade–Giles: T‘ang Seng; Japanese pronunciation: Tōsō; Korean pronunciation: Dangseung; Vietnamese: Đường Tăng', McCune–Reischauer: Tangsŭng.) (Note: Less common romanizations of "Xuanzang" include Hyun Tsan, Hhuen Kwan, Hiuan Tsang, Hiouen Thsang, Hiuen Tsang, Hiuen Tsiang, Hsien-tsang, Hsyan-tsang, Hsuan Chwang, Huan Chwang, Hsuan Tsiang, Hwen Thsang, Hsüan Chwang, Hhüen Kwān, Xuan Cang, Xuan Zang, Shuen Shang, Yuan Chang, Yuan Chwang, and Yuen Chwang. Hsüan, Hüan, Huan and Chuang are also found. The sound written x in pinyin and hs in Wade–Giles, which represents the s- or sh-like [ɕ] in today's Mandarin, was previously pronounced as the h-like [x] in early Mandarin, which accounts for the archaic transliterations with h.)

Another form of his official style was "Yuanzang", written 元奘. It is this form that accounts for such variants as Yuan Chang, Yuan Chwang, and Yuen Chwang.

Tang Monk (Tang Seng) is also transliterated Thang Seng.

Another of Xuanzang's standard aliases is Sanzang Fashi (simplified Chinese: 三藏法师; traditional Chinese: 三藏法師; pinyin: Sānzàngfǎshī; lit. 'Sanzang Dharma (or Law) Teacher'): 法 being a Chinese translation for Sanskrit "Dharma" or Pali/Prakrit Dhamma, the implied meaning being "Buddhism".

"Sanzang" is the Chinese term for the Buddhist canon, or Tripiṭaka ("Three Baskets"), and in some English-language fiction and English translations of Journey to the West, Xuanzang is addressed as "Tripitaka."

== Early life ==
Xuanzang was born Chen Hui (or Chen Yi) on 6 April 602 CE in Chenhe Village, Goushi Town (緱氏鎮), Luozhou (near present-day Luoyang, Henan). His family was noted for its erudition for generations, and Xuanzang was the youngest of four children. His ancestor was Chen Shi (104–186), a minister of the Eastern Han dynasty. His great-grandfather Chen Qin (陳欽) served as the prefect of Shangdang (上黨; present-day Changzhi, Shanxi) during the Eastern Wei; his grandfather Chen Kang (陳康) was a professor in the Taixue (Imperial Academy) during the Northern Qi. His father Chen Hui (陳惠) served as the magistrate of Jiangling County during the Sui dynasty. According to traditional biographies, Xuanzang displayed a superb intelligence and earnestness, studied with his father, and amazed him by his careful observance of filial piety after one such study about that topic.

His elder brother was already a monk in a Buddhist monastery. Inspired, at a young age, Xuanzang expressed interest in becoming a Buddhist monk like his brother. After the death of his father in 611, he lived with his older brother Chen Su (陳素), later known as Zhangjie (長捷), for five years at Jingtu Monastery (Chinese: 淨土寺) in Luoyang, supported by the Sui state. During this time he studied Mahayana as well as various early Buddhist schools.

In 618, the Sui Dynasty collapsed and Xuanzang and his brother fled to Chang'an, which had been proclaimed as the capital of the Tang dynasty, and thence 300 miles southward to Chengdu, Sichuan. Here the two brothers spent two or three years in further study in the monastery of Kong Hui, including the Abhidharma-kośa Śāstra. The abbot Zheng Shanguo allowed Xuanzang to study these advanced subjects though he was young.

Taking the monastic name Xuanzang, he was fully ordained as a monk in 622, at the age of twenty. The myriad contradictions and discrepancies in the Chinese translations at that time prompted Xuanzang to decide to go to India and study in the cradle of Buddhism. He knew about Faxian's visit to India and, like him, sought original untranslated Sanskrit texts from India to help resolve some of these issues.

== Pilgrimage ==
=== Dates ===
Xuanzang started his pilgrimage to India in either 627 or 629 CE, according to two East Asian versions. The 627 CE version is found in Guang hongming ji from Daoxun and is also in Japanese and Korean texts. The 629 CE is found in Chinese and western versions. This confusion, though merely of two years, is of significance to western history.

The date when Xuanzang's pilgrimage started is not resolved in any of the texts that Xuanzang himself wrote. Further, he did not write his own biography or travelogue, rather he recited it to his fellow monks after his return from India. Three of his immediate collaborators wrote his biography, and thus leaving three versions and with variant details. All three of these versions begin his pilgrimage in 629 CE.

Yet, one version by Huili, states that Xuanzang met Yabghu Qaghan, someone who died in 628 CE according to Persian and Turkish records. If this detail in Xuanzang's biography and Persian-Turkish records are true, then Xuanzang must have left before Qaghan's death, or in 627 CE. In other words, some of the details in the surviving versions of Xuanzang biography were invented or a paleographic confusion introduced an error, or the Persian-Turkish records are unreliable. The Japanese version is based on 8th to 10th-century translations of texts that ultimately came from Xuanzang's monastery, which unfortunately has added to the confusion. Most sources state that Xuanzang started his pilgrimage in 629 CE.

=== Travel through Central Asia ===
Purpose of journey

The purpose of my journey is not to obtain personal
offerings. It is because I regretted, in my country,
the Buddhist doctrine was imperfect and the scriptures were
incomplete. Having many doubts, I wish to go and find out
the truth, and so I decided to travel to the West at the
risk of my life in order to seek for the teachings of
which I have not yet heard, so that the Dew of
the Mahayana sutras would have not only been sprinkled at
Kapilavastu, but the sublime truth may also be known in
the eastern country.

— Xuanzang (Translator: Li Yung-hsi)

==== Kingdom of Agni ====
In 630 CE, he arrived in the kingdom of Agni (Yanqi, in a place called Turpan). Here he met the king—a Buddhist—along with his uncle Jnanachandra and precept Mokshagupta, who tried to persuade him to quit his journey and teach them Buddhist knowledge. He declined and they equipped him further for his travels with letters of introduction and valuables to serve as funds. Xuanzang observed that the country of Agni had more than ten monasteries following the Sarvastivada school of Hinayana Buddhism, with two thousand monks who ate "three kinds of pure meat" with other foods, rather than vegetarian food only that would be consistent with Mahayana Buddhist teachings. Therefore, the Buddhists in this country had stagnated in their Buddhist teachings.

==== Kingdom of Kuchi ====
Moving further westward, Xuanzang met about two thousand Turkic robbers on horses. The robbers began fighting with each other on how to fairly divide the loot. After the loot had thus been lost, they dispersed. Xuanzang thereafter reached the country of Kuchi. This country of 1000 li by 600 li, had over one hundred monasteries with five thousand monks following the Sarvastivada school of Hinayana Buddhism, and studying its texts in "original Indian language".

Xuanzang writes of a dragon race and a region where water dragons metamorphose into horses to mate and create dragon-horses, also into men and mating with women nearby, creating dragon-men who could run as fast as the dragon-horses. These were men who will have massacred an entire city, leaving the place deserted.

==== Baluka and other kingdoms ====
Further west he passed Aksu before turning northwest to cross the Tian Shan and then further to Tokmak. He met the great Khagan of the Göktürks. After a feast, Xuanzang continued west then southwest to Tashkent, capital of modern Uzbekistan. Xuanzang describes more monasteries, such as the Eastern Cakuri monastery and Ascarya monastery, with Buddha's footprints and Buddha idols. According to Xuanzang's accounts, mystical light emanated from Buddha's footprints on "fast days". In the country of Baluka, the Sarvastivada school of Hinayana Buddhism was in vogue. He crossed the countries of Samarkand, Mimohe, Kaputana, Kusanika, Bukhara, Betik, Horismika and Tukhara. These had cities near rivers or lakes, then vast regions with no inhabitants, little water or grass. He describes warring factions of Turk chieftains in control, with "illness and pestilence" rampant.

From here, he crossed a desert, icy valleys and the Pamir range (which link Tian Shan, Karakoram, Kunlun, Uparisyena and the Himalaya mountain ranges). Here, observed Xuanzang, the wind is cold and "blows with a piercing vehemence" (Li Rongxi translation). Ferocious dragons live here and trouble the travellers particularly those who wear "reddish brown" color clothes. Thereafter, he crossed past a salty sea, one narrow from north to south and long from east to west, he calls the Great Pure Lake. He describes supernatural monsters, fish and dragons living in this lake. The Xuanzang travelogues then briefly innumerate the names of many countries, stating that more details are provided in the return part of his journey, as he crosses into country of Bactra (modern Balkh). He adds that the Hinayana Buddhist schools were followed in all these regions.

In the capital of the country of Bactra, states Xuanzang, is a monastery with a Buddha's idol decorated with jewels and its halls studded with rare precious substances. The Buddhist monastery also has an image of Vaishravana deity as its guardian. The monastery and the capital attracts repeated raids from the Turk chieftains who seek to loot these precious jewels. This monastery has a large bathing pot that looks dazzlingly brilliant and has a Buddha's tooth relic and Buddha's broom made of "kasa grass". Outside is a vihara built ages ago, and many stupas to honor the arhats (Buddhist saints).

==== Kingdom of Bamiyana ====
South of Bactra is the country of Kacik, then the Great Snow Mountains with valleys "infested with gangs of brigands" (Li Rongxi translation). Crossing this pass, thereafter is the country of Bamiyana (a part of modern Afghanistan). There, states his travelogue, is a colossal statue of standing Buddha, carved from a rock in the mountains, some one hundred and forty feet tall and decorated with gems. This valley has Buddhist monasteries, and also a colossal copper statue of the Buddha, that is over a hundred foot tall. He was told that it was cast in separate parts and then joined up together. To the east of a monastery in the Bamiyana valley was a Reclining Buddha entering Parinirvana that was over one thousand foot long. The people and the king of this valley serve the Buddhist monks, records Xuanzang.

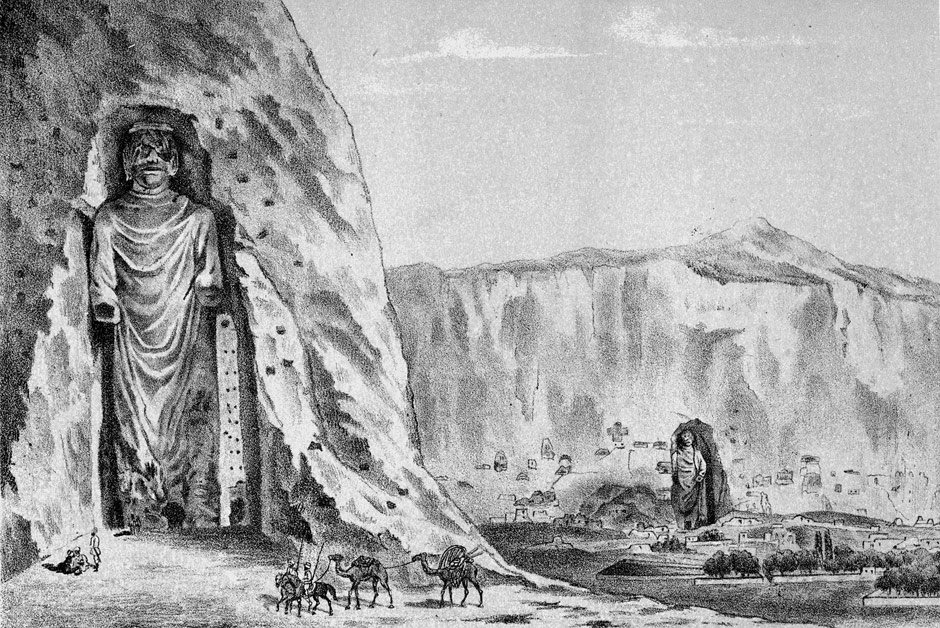
Xuanzang describes colossal Buddhas carved into the rocks of Bamiyan region (above: 19th-century sketch, destroyed by the Taliban in 2001).

Heading east and crossing the Black range, Xuanzang describes the country of Kapishi, where the Mahayana tradition of Buddhism had come in vogue. It had over 100 monasteries with stupas. More than 6000 monks, mostly Mahayana, studied here. Along with these Buddhist monasteries, states his travelogue, there were over ten Deva temples (Hindu) with "heretical believers who go about naked and smear dust over their bodies", translates Li Rongxi. Furthermore, in the same capital region, there is a Hinayana monastery with 300 monks at the northern foothills.

The citizens of this country, adds Xuanzang, fondly recall "King Kanishka of Gandhara" (2nd-century CE, Kushan Empire). To its east are the "City of Svetavat temple" and the Aruna Mountain known for its frequent avalanches. His travelogue then describes several popular legends about a Naga king. He also describes miraculous events from a Buddhist stupa, such as raging flames bursting out of them leaving behind stream of pearls. The citizens here, states Xuanzang, worship pieces of Buddha's remains that were brought here in more ancient times. He mentions four stupas built in this area by king Ashoka.

=== Travel through India and South Asia ===
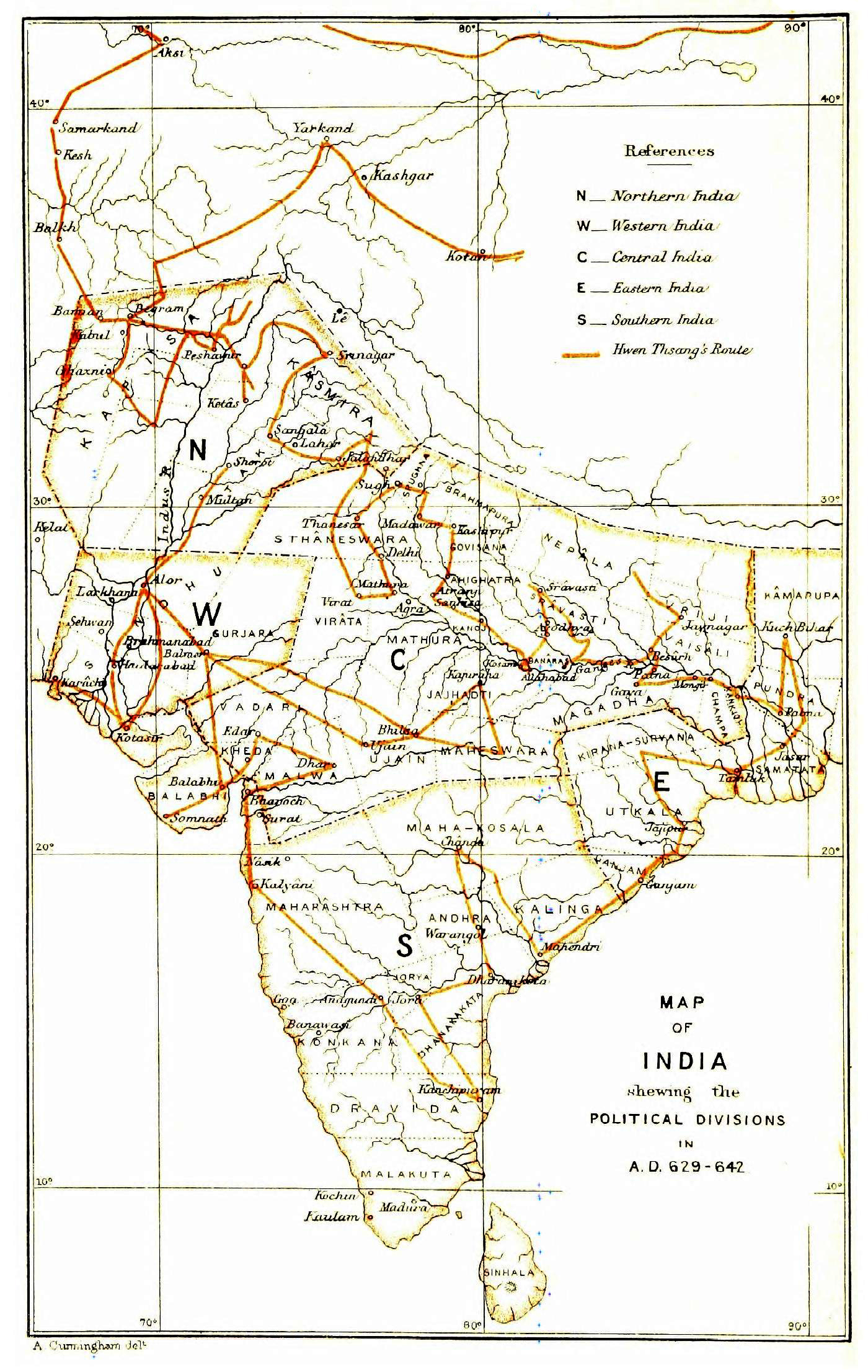
Reconstructed route of Xuanzang over 629–645 CE through India. Along with Nalanda in Bihar, he visited locations that are now in Kashmir, Gujarat, Madhya Pradesh, Odisha, Tamil Nadu, and Bangladesh.

To Xuanzang, he entered India as he crossed the Black range and entered the country of Lampa. His travelogue presents India in fascicles separate from those for Central Asia. He, however, does not call it India, but the phonetic equivalent of what previously has been variously interpreted as "Tianzhu" or "Shengdu" or "Xiandou". More recent scholarship suggests the closest pronunciation of the 7th-century term in his travelogues would be "Indu".

Xuanzang states that India is a vast country over ninety thousand li in circuit, with seventy kingdoms, sea on three sides and snow mountains to its north. It is a land that is rich and moist, cultivation productive, vegetation luxuriant. He adds that it has its own ancient customs, such as measuring its distance as "yojana", equal to forty li, but varying between thirty and sixteen depending on the source. They divide day and night into kala, and substances into various divisions, all the way to a fineness that they call indivisible and emptiness. The country has three seasons: hot, cold, rainy according to some Buddhists; while others say it is four: three months each of spring, summer, monsoon, and autumn.

The kingdoms of India have numerous villages and cities. Their towns and cities have square walls, streets are winding and narrow, with shops lined along these roads. Wine is sold in shops on the side streets. Those whose profession is butchering, fishing, executioners, scavengers (people that kill living beings and deal with products derived from them) are not allowed to live inside the cities. The cities are built from bricks, while homes are either made mostly from bricks or from "wattled bamboo or wood". Cottages are thatched with straw and grass.

The residents of India clean their floor and then smear it with a preparation of cow dung, followed by decorating it with flowers, unlike Chinese homes. Their children go to school at age seven, where they begin learning a number of treatises of the five knowledges – first grammar, second technical skills which he states includes arts, mechanics, yin-yang and the calendar, third medicine, fourth being logic, and fifth field of knowledge taught is inner knowledge along with theory of cause and effect.

After further similar introduction covering the diverse aspects of the Indian culture he observed, including fashion, hair styles, preference for being barefoot, ritual washing their hands after releasing bodily waste, cleaning teeth by chewing special tree twigs, taking baths before going to their temples, worshipping in their temples, their alphabet that contains forty seven letters, the diversity of languages spoken, how harmonious and elegant they sound when they speak their languages, Xuanzang presents the various kingdoms of India.

Xuanzang includes a section on the differences between the Hinayana and Mahayana Buddhist communities. There are eighteen sects in Buddhism, according to Xuanzang. They stand against each other, debate "various viewpoints, as vehemently as crashing waves". Though they share the same goal, they study different subjects and use sharp words to argue. Each Buddhist sect has different set of rules and regulations for their monks. The monks who cannot expound a single text must do the routine monastic duties (cleaning monastery and such). Those who can expound one Buddhist text flawlessly is exempt from such duties. Those who can recite two texts, get better quality rooms. Monks who can expound three Buddhist texts get attendants to serve them, while the few monks who can expound all four are provided with lay servants. Expounders of five texts have elephants for travel, while six texts entitles them to security retinue.

==== Kingdom of Lampa, Nagarahara, and Gandhara ====
Xuanzang describes Lampaka (modern Laghman, near the source of Kabul river) as the territory of north India, one whose circuit is more than 1000 li and where all monasteries studied Mahayana Buddhism. They have tens of Deva temples (Hindu) which heretics (non-Buddhists) frequent. To its southeast is the country of (modern Nangarhar), with many Buddhist monasteries and five Deva temples. The number of monks here, however, are few.

The stupa are deserted and in a dilapidated condition. The local Buddhists believe that the Buddha taught here while flying in the air, because were he to walk here, it caused many earthquakes. Nagarahara has a 300 feet high stupa built by Ashoka, with marvellous sculptures. Xuanzang paid homage by circling it. Both Lampaka and Nagarahara countries were independent with their own kings, but they have become a vassal of the Buddhist Kingdom of Kapisa found near Bamiyana.

The monasteries in these kingdoms are ornate, with four corner towers and halls with three tiers. They have figures at the joints, rafters, eaves and roof beams. The Indians paint the walls, doors and windows with colors and pictures. People prefer to have home that look simple from outside, but is much decorated inside. They construct their homes such a way that they open towards the east.

Xuanzang also describes implausible events such as glowing rock footprints of Buddha, dragons, tales of Naga, a stupa in which is preserved the Buddha's eyeball as "large as a crabapple" and that is "brilliant and transparent" throughout, a white stone Buddha idol that worked miracles and "frequently emitted light". The travelogue states that Xuanzang went into a dark cave here where dangerous beings lived, recited Srimaladevi Simhanadasutra, and they became Buddhists. Thereafter they all burnt incense and worshipped the Buddha with flowers.

Some five hundred li (~200 kilometer in 7th-century) to the southeast is the country of Gandhara – which some historic Chinese texts phonetically transcribed as Qiantuowei. On its east, it is bordered by the Indus river, and its capital is Purusapura.

This is the land of ancient sages and authors of Indic sastras, and they include Narayanadeva, Asanga, Vasubandhu, Dharmatrata, Monaratha and Parshva. To the southeast of Purusapura city is a 400-foot-high stupa built by Emperor Kanishka, one with nearly 2000 feet in diameter and a 25 layer wheel on the top. There is a large monastery near it. Gandhara has numerous holy Buddhist sites, and Xuanzang visited and worshipped all of them. He calls the stupas and the Buddha images in this region as "magnificent" and made with "perfect craftmanship".

==== Kingdom of Udayana, Kashmira ====
Heading north towards Kashmir, he arrived in the city of Pushkalavati, with many holy Buddhist sites. Xuanzang worshipped at these "great stupas and big monasteries". Thereafter he reached the country of Udayana, through which flowed the Subhavastu river (now called Swat river). It had 1400 monasteries of five early Buddhist schools (of 18 sub-traditions) – Sarvastivada, Mahāsāṃghika, Kasyapiya, Mahisasaka and Dharmagupta. These schools became unpopular, as the later form of Mahayana prospered. According to Xuanzang, these monasteries of early Buddhist schools are desolate and attract few monks. He then reached the city of Hi-lo and Manglaur.

In all these places, he mentions how the Buddha lived here in one of his previous lives (Jataka legends) and illustrated compassion-strength through his actions. There is a Buddhist temple northeast of Manglaur with the Avalokitesvara Bodhisattva image, one is noted for "its miraculous manifestations". Crossing another 1000 li, he reached Darada valley – the old capital of Udayana, with a 100 feet golden wood statue of Maitreya Boddhisattva. This statue, states his travelogue, was built by an artist who went three times into heaven to see how he looks and then carve the realistic image of him on earth.

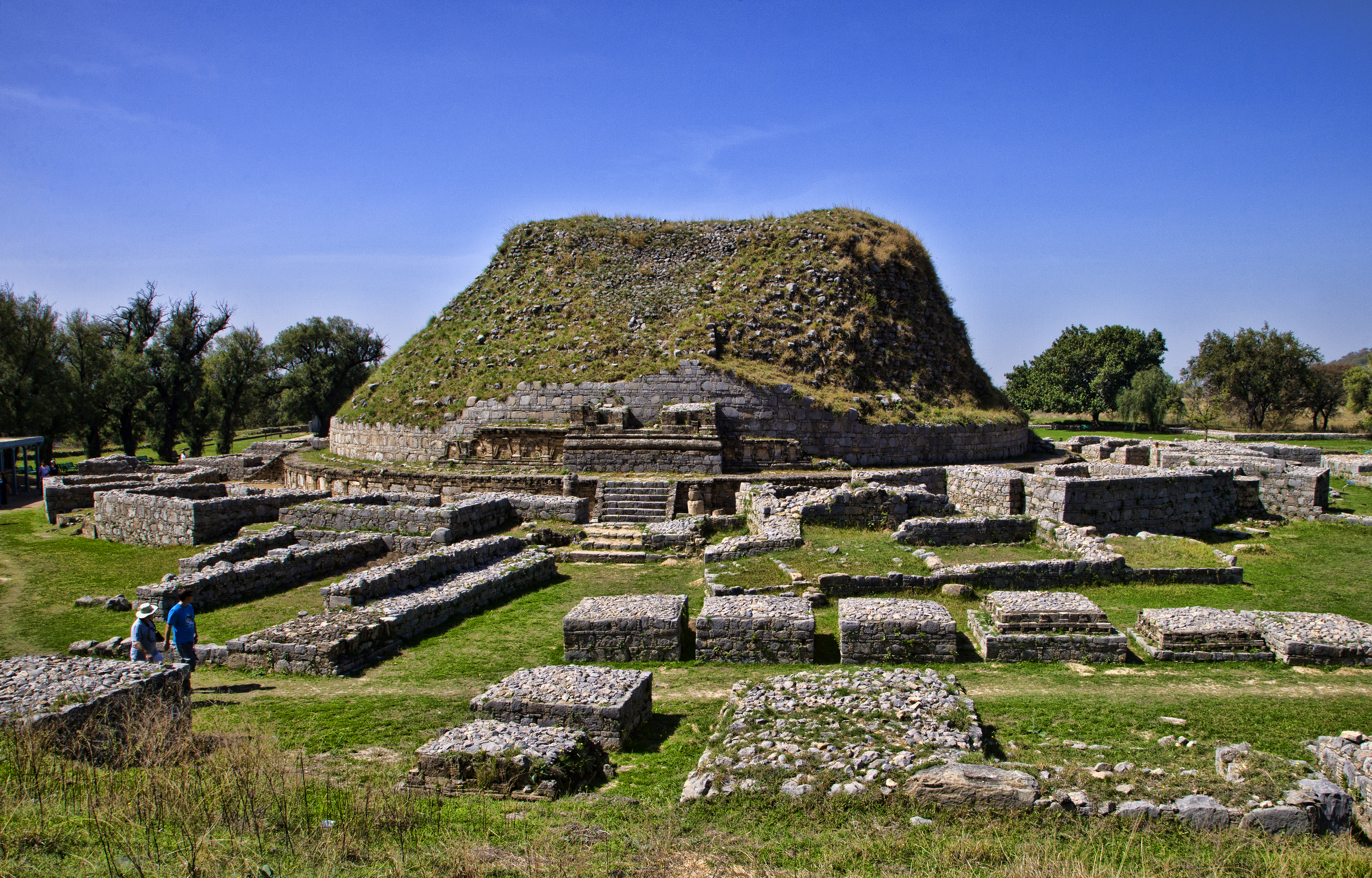
Xuanzang describes thousands of monasteries and stupas in northwest India. Above: the ruins of Dharmarajika stupa, Taxila.

Xuanzang arrived in Taxila, after crossing a river with "poisonous dragons and evil animals". There, he visited a major Buddhist monastery of the Sautrantika school. From there, after covering some 2200 li, he passed through the country of Simhapura (Kalabagh), of Urasa (now Hazara), and then into Kashmira. He was received by the king, and numerous monks from the Jayendra monastery. Kashmira is land with a very cold climate and is often calm without any wind. The region has lakes, grows plenty of flowers and fruit, saffron and medicinal herbs. Kashmira has over 100 monasteries and more than 5000 monks. The residents revere four large stupas that were built in ancient times by Ashoka.

Emperor Kanishika too built many Buddhist monasteries here. He also had treatises with 960,000 words written on copper plates and had them stored in a newly built great stupa. The Kashmira region has numerous monks well versed with the Tripitaka, states Xuanzang. He stays in Kashmira for two years and studies the treatises with them.

Xuanzang describes many events where he is helped by both Buddhists and non-Buddhists. For example, he describes leaving the city of Sakala and Narasimha, then passing with his companions through the Great Palasha forest. They get robbed and are walked towards some dry pond to be killed. A monk and he slip away. They hurry towards a village. Near it, they meet a Brahmana who is tilling his land. They tell him that robbers attacked them and their companions. The Brahmin goes to the village and beats a drum and blows a conch. About 80 men gather, and together they proceed to rescue the companions of Xuanzang.

While other rescued companions of his wail about the loss of all their property, Xuanzang reminds them that they should all be happy to be alive and not worry about the loss of property. The villagers help his companions and him by hosting them before the resume their journey. Yet, elsewhere, Xuanzang also recites the implausible tale of meeting a Brahmana who was 700 years old and had two associates, each over 100 years old, who had mastered all of the Vedas and the Buddhist Madhyamika sastra. He calls them heretics (non-Buddhists). These heretics help him and his companions get new garments and food. He stayed with this implausibly old Brahmana for a month, and studied the Madhyamika sastra with him.

==== The memorial of Pāṇini ====
To the northeast of Varsha country, states Xuanzang, there is a lofty mountain with a bluish stone image of Bhimadevi. She is the wife of Mahesvara. It is a great site of pilgrimage, where Indians from very far come with prayers. At the foot of this mountain is another temple for Mahesvara where ceremonies are performed by naked heretics who smear ash on their body. About 30 li (about 12 kilometers in 7th-century) southeast from these temples is Salatura, which says Xuanzang was the birthplace of Rishi Pāṇini and the author of "Sabda-vidya-sastra" (Sound-knowledge-studies).

Inspired by Mahesvara, this Rishi set out to "make inquiries into the way of learning" (Li Rongxi translation). He thoroughly studied all written and spoken language, words in ancient and his times, then created a treatise of one thousand stanzas. The heretics (Hindus) transmit this text orally from teacher to pupil, and it is this that makes the Brahmanas of this city "great scholars of high talent with knowledge of wide scope". They have an image of Pāṇini installed in reverence of him in this city of Salatura.

==== Kingdoms of Takka, Jalamdhara, Sthanesvara, Mathura, Matipura, Kapitha ====
The country of Takka is south of Kashmira, extending from the Indus river to its west and Vipasha river to its east. They produce abundant quantities of non-sticky rice and wheat, also gold, brass, iron and other metals. They do not believe in Buddhism, and pray in several hundred deva temples. This country has ten Buddhist monasteries left. There were many more before, states Xuanzang. These were destroyed few hundred years ago, during the rule of a king named Mahirakula (Mihirakula). The king did this in anger because when he asked the monasteries in his domain for a Buddhist teacher to teach him Buddhism, the Buddhists did not send to him any learned scholar. Mahirakula's cruel deed against the Buddhists triggered the king of Magadha to go to war with him. Mahirakula is defeated, forgiven but returns to power by assassinating the king of Kashmira and Gandhara. Xuanzang recites the hearsay stories he heard about Mahirakula's continued cruelty and destruction of 1600 stupas and monasteries. Xuanzang then describes the surviving monasteries in Sagala with hundreds of Buddhist monks, along with its three colossal stupas, each over 200 feet tall, two built by Ashoka.

Xuanzang visited the country of Chinabhukti next, which he states got its name because a region west of the Yellow river was a vassal state of Emperor Kanishka. From there, during Kanishka's reign, peaches and pears plantations were imported into Chinabhukti, northern India. Further northeast, he visited a Buddhist monastery of the Sarvastivada school with 300 monks. He describes another colossal stupa that is over 200 feet tall built by Emperor Ashoka. Near this, states Xuanzang, are numerous small stupas and large Buddhist caves. Around this monastery in the Himalayan hills are "hundreds and thousands of stupas, built so closely together than their shadows touch one another" (Li Rongxi translation). From there, he visited Jalamdhara. It grows non-sticky rice and cereals, its forest are luxuriant, the region is lush with flowers and fruits. They have 50 monasteries with over 2000 monks studying Mahayana and Hinayana traditions of Buddhism. They also have deva temples where heretics smear their bodies with ashes (Shiva-Hinduism).

From Jalambhara, Xuanzang travelled northeast through jagged peaks, deep valleys and dangerous trails into the Himalayan country of Kuluta. It is surrounded by mountains, and has abundant fruits, flowers and trees. It has twenty monasteries and over a thousand Buddhist monks studying mostly Mahayana Buddhism. It has fifteen deva temples frequented by heretics (Hindus). This region has many caves where Buddhist arhats and Rishis (saints) live. He then headed south, into the country of Shatadru. Here, writes Xuanzang, people wear "gorgeous, extravagant" clothes, the climate is hot and citizens are honest and friendly by custom. It has ten monasteries, but ruined and with few monks. He visits the country of Pariyatra, where they have plenty of cattle and sheep, as well as a type of rice that they harvest in sixty days after planting. This region has eight ruined monasteries and ten deva temples. The monks study Hinayana Buddhism here.

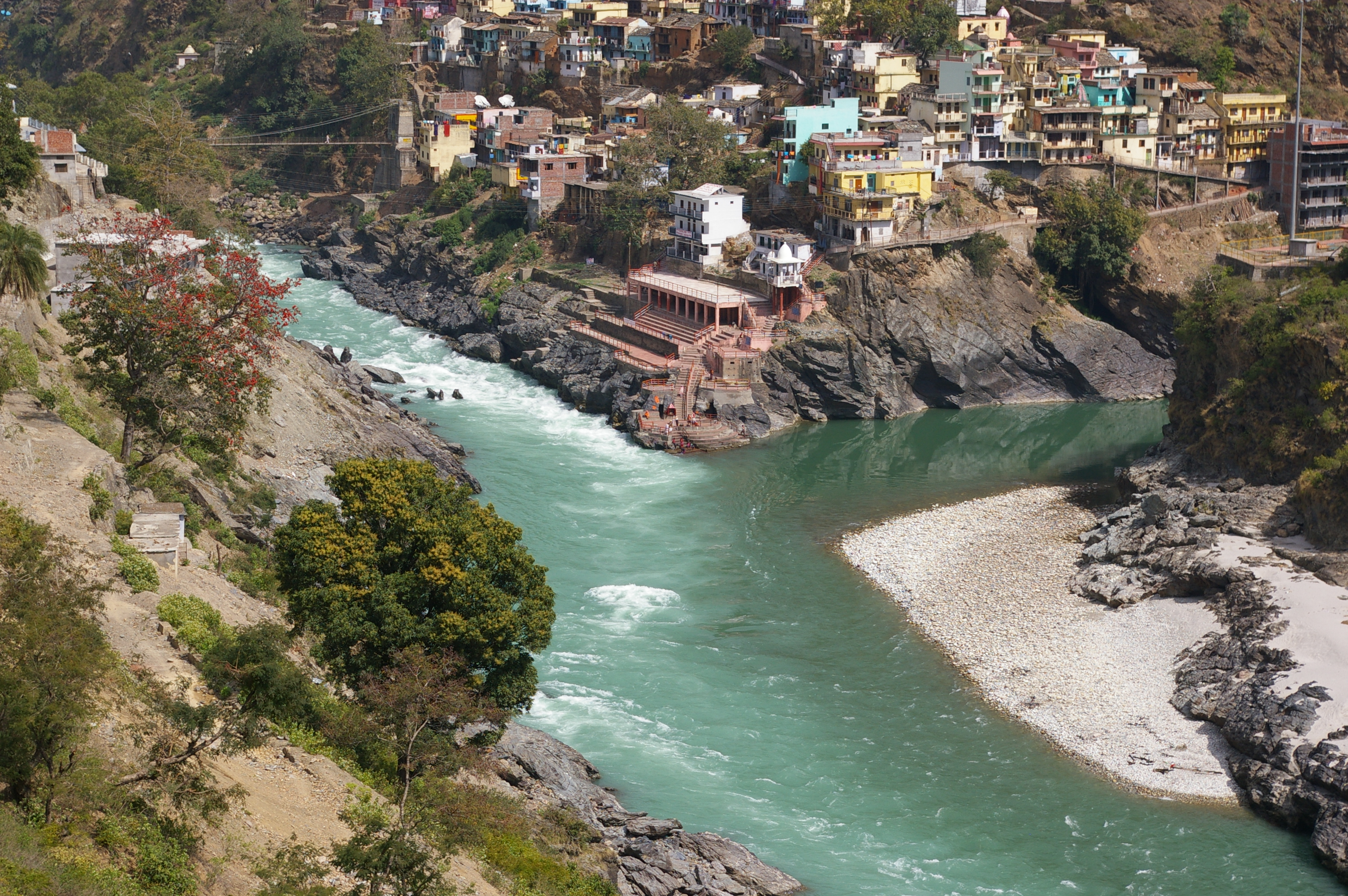
Xuanzang describes Ganges river with blue waters, who heretics believe carries "waters of blessedness", and in which a dip leads to expiation of sins.

Xuanzang next arrived in the country of Mathura, calling it a part of central India. This region is fertile, people love mangoes, they produce cloth and gold. The climate is hot, the people are genial and good by custom, they advocate learning and virtue, states Xuanzang. This country has over twenty monasteries with over two thousand monks studying Hinayana and Mahayana Buddhism. Many deva temples are also found in this country. He describes the ritual carrying and worship of the Buddha and Buddhist deities in this country with incense and flowers scattered in streets. He visits and praises the Govinda monastery in the Mathura country. Next he visits the country of Sthanesvara, which has wealthy but unkind citizens who show off their wealth. It has three Buddhist monasteries with over seven hundred monks, a lustrous and clean colossal stupa which witnesses "many divine manifestations". It also has well over hundred deva temples and numerous heretics.

The country of Srughna has Ganges river to its east and Yamuna river in the middle of it. These people are like those in Sthanesvara country. They believe in heretical ideas (Hindu) and are honest by nature, states Xuanzang. They cherish learning, arts and crafts, and cultivate wisdom, blessedness. In this country are five Buddhist monasteries, over thousand monks mostly studying Hinayana, and over one hundred deva temples with numerous heretics. East of this region is the Ganges river with dark blue waters and strange creatures living in it, but these creatures do not harm people. The water of Ganges is sweet in taste, and the heretics believe it to contain the "water of blessedness", and that bathing in it causes sins to be expiated.

After crossing Ganges, he entered into the country of Matipura. Here, according to Xuanzang, half of the population is Buddhist and the other believe in heterodox religions. The climate is cooler and more temperate, its people are honest and esteem learning. The king of this country worships at the deva temples. The Matipura country has ten monasteries and over eight hundred monks, mostly studying Hinayana. Over fifty deva temples are frequented by the heretics here. Xuanzang describes the sastras composed and under study at the major Buddhist monasteries of Matipura. This region has the city of Mayura, densely populated and with a great deva temple near the Ganges river. The heretics call it the "Gate of the Ganges". People from all five parts of India – east, north, west, south, central – come here crossing long distances on pilgrimage and to bathe at these gates. This place has numerous rest and almshouses, where the "isolated, solitary and needy people get free food and medical service". North of this place is the country of Brahmapura, densely populated with prosperous and rich people. Colder in climate, here people are rude and violent by custom. This region has five Buddhist monasteries and ten deva temples. Southeast of here, states Xuanzang, is the country of Ahicchattra with ten monasteries and a thousand monks belonging to the Sammitiya sect of Hinayana Buddhism. It has five deva temples where heretics smear their bodies with ashes. The country of Vilashana and Kapitha are south and southeast of Ahicchattra. Most people in Vilashana are non-Buddhists, and there are two monasteries here with three hundred Buddhist monks. In Kapitha, there are four monasteries teaching Hinayana Buddhism, and they have over a thousand monks. Along with these Buddhist institution, Kapitha has ten deva temples. Kapitha, states Xuanzang, has a "beautifully constructed monastery with many lofty and spacious buildings adoerned with exquisite carvings" (Li Rongxi translation). It has Buddha statue at the top, Indra statue at left of the entrance and Brahma statue to the right.

==== Kingdoms of Kanyakubja, Ayodhya, Prayaga, Kausambi, Visaka ====
The country of Kanyākubja, also called Kusumapura, has the Ganges River to its west, with flowery forests of brilliant colors, transparent waters and prosperous people, states Xuanzang. According to him, they are simple and honest by custom, with handsome and graceful features. They cherish arts and literature, speak lucidly. Half of the population is Buddhist, half heretics. The Buddhists study both Mahayana and Hinayana teachings. The heretics have over two hundred deva temples.

The current monarch is Harshavardhana, a Hindu of Bais Kshatriya lineage. Three of his ancestors were also monarchs, and they were all known to the Chinese monarchs as virtuous. Xuanzang then recites, at length, the story of prince Shiladitya and how he constructed both major monasteries and temples, feeding hundreds of Buddhist monks and hundreds of Hindu priests on festive days. He describes numerous monasteries in the southeast of its capital, along with large Buddhist temple made of stone and brocks, with a thirty feet tall Buddha statue. To the south of this is temple, states Xuanzang, is a Surya temple built from bluestone. Next to the Surya temple is a Mahesvara (Shiva) temple also made from bluestone. Both are profusely carved with sculptures. About 100 li to the southeast of Shiladitya's capital, states Xuanzang, is the Navadevakula city on the eastern bank of Ganges river. It is surrounded by flowery wood, has three monasteries with five hundred monks, and a multi-tiered terraced deva temple that is "exquisitely constructed" (Li Rongxi translation).

About 600 li to the southeast is the country of Ayodhya. It grows abundant amounts of cereals, is blessed with fruits and flowers. People are benign and dedicate themselves to arts and crafts. Ayodhya has over a hundred monasteries and three thousand monks studying Hinayana and Mahayana Buddhism. Its capital has ten deva temples. This is the country where some of the key shastras of the Sautrantika school of Buddhism were composed. A few hundred li east of Ayodhya is the country of Ayamukha. Here too, states Xuanzang, people are honest and simple. They have five monasteries with over one thousand monks, mostly studying Hinayana. Near them are ten deva temples.

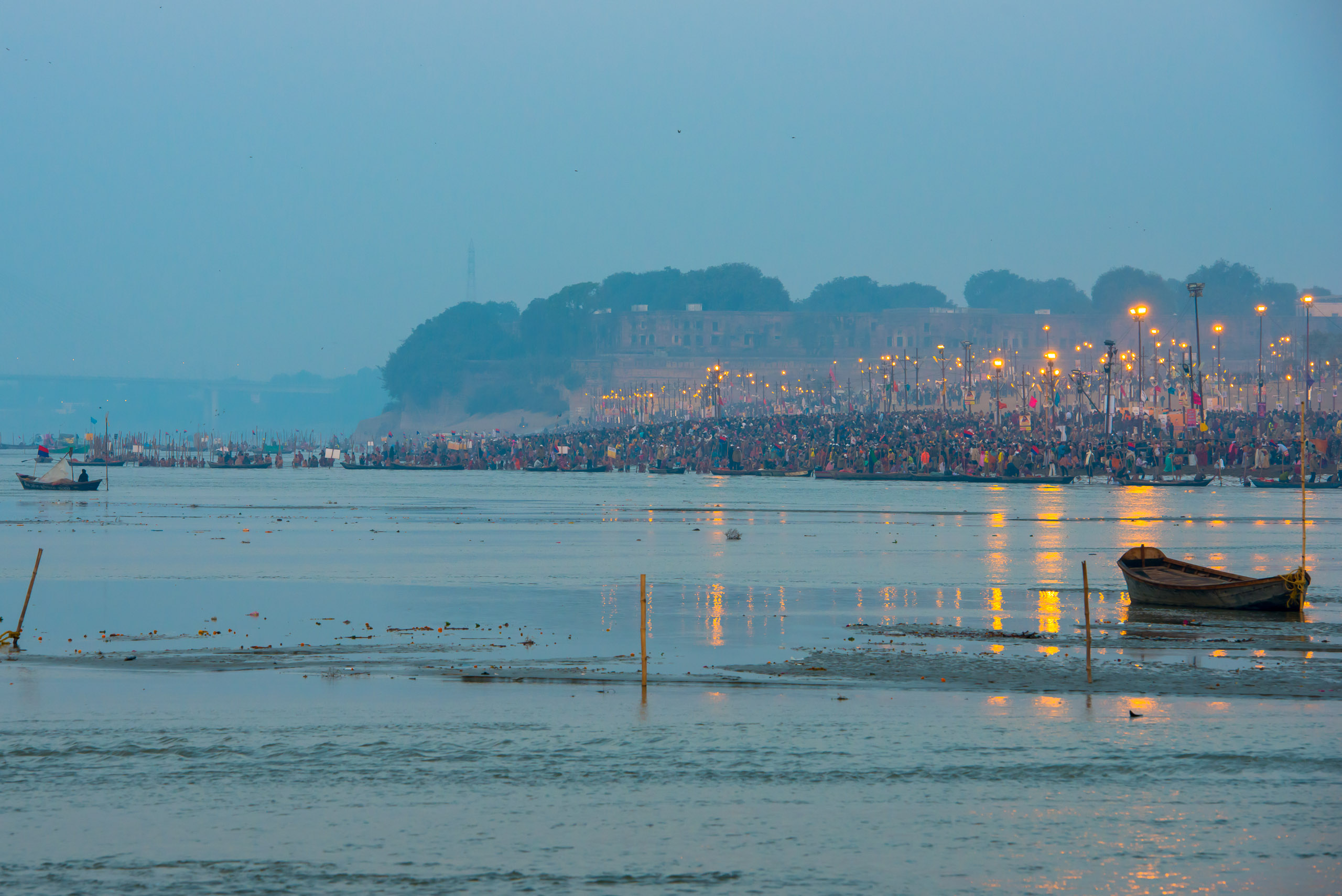
Xuanzang describes Prayaga as a great city where Ganges and Yamuna meet, one where people ritually fast, bathe and give away alms.

About 700 li southeast is the country of Prayaga, on the banks of Yamuna river. Xuanzang describes the country as having luxuriant fruit trees and cereal crops, and its people as kind and helpful. Most of them believe in heretical religions, and Prayaga has several hundreds of deva temples. Xuanzang notes south of the city is a forest full of champaka flowers with a 100-foot ancient stupa with collapsed foundation, originally built by Ashoka. The city has a temple with decorated buildings. To the east of this city, two rivers meet forming a dune that is over ten li wide called the Grand Place of Almsgiving. Wealthy people and kings, such as Shiladitya, pilgrimage and give alms. Other people gather here and bathe at the confluence of the two rivers; some drown themselves, believing this washes away their sins and that it will give them a better rebirth.

Five hundred li from Prayaga is the country of Kausambi. It produces abundant quantities of non-sticky rice and sugarcane. The citizens are bold, furious and dedicated to good deeds by custom. It has ten deserted and dilapidated Buddhist monasteries, attended by about three hundred monks. The country has fifty deva temples and numerous non-Buddhists. In the capital, within the palace is a Buddhist temple with a Buddha statue made from sandalwood. This Buddha image "emits divine light" sometimes, states Xuanzang. He adds that Kausambi is the place that Buddhists text predict is where the Buddha Dharma will come to an end in a distant future, therefore anyone who comes to this place feels sad and "sheds tears" (Li Rongxi translation).

He headed northeast, crossed Ganges river again, and this came to the country of Vishaka. He calls its people sincere and honest by custom, fond of learning. It has twenty monasteries and three thousand monks studying Hinayana Buddhism. Vishaka has numerous non-Buddhists and over fifty deva temples.

==== Kingdoms of Sravasti Kushinagara, Baranasi, Nepala ====
In Fascicle 6 of the travelogue manuscript, Xuanzang focuses on some of the holiest sites in Buddhism. He begins with Shravasti (present-day northeastern Uttar Pradesh), describing it to be a country of over six thousand li in circuit. The capital city is desolate, states Xuanzang, though some residents still live here. There are over a hundred monasteries in its capital city, many dilapidated, where monks study Hinayana Buddhism. The country has a hundred deva temples. He saw the decaying remains of Prasenajit's palace, then to its east the Great Dhamma Hall stupa, another stupa and a temple for the maternal aunt of the Buddha. Next to these, states Xuanzang, is the great stupa of Angulimala. About five li (~2 kilometers in 7th century) south of the city is the Jetavana garden with two 70 feet high pillars standing, but the monastery there is in ruins. One pillar has a wheel carved at its top, the other a bull. Xuanzang saw all the monuments associated with the Shravasti legends with the Buddha, though many of these were in dilapidated condition. He also saw a Buddhist temple 60 feet high with a seated Buddha image, and a deva temple about the same size as the Buddha temple, both in good condition. Over sixty li to the northwest of Shravasti capital, he saw a series of stupas built by Ashoka for Kashyapa Buddha, one who lived for "twenty thousand" years, states Xuanzang.

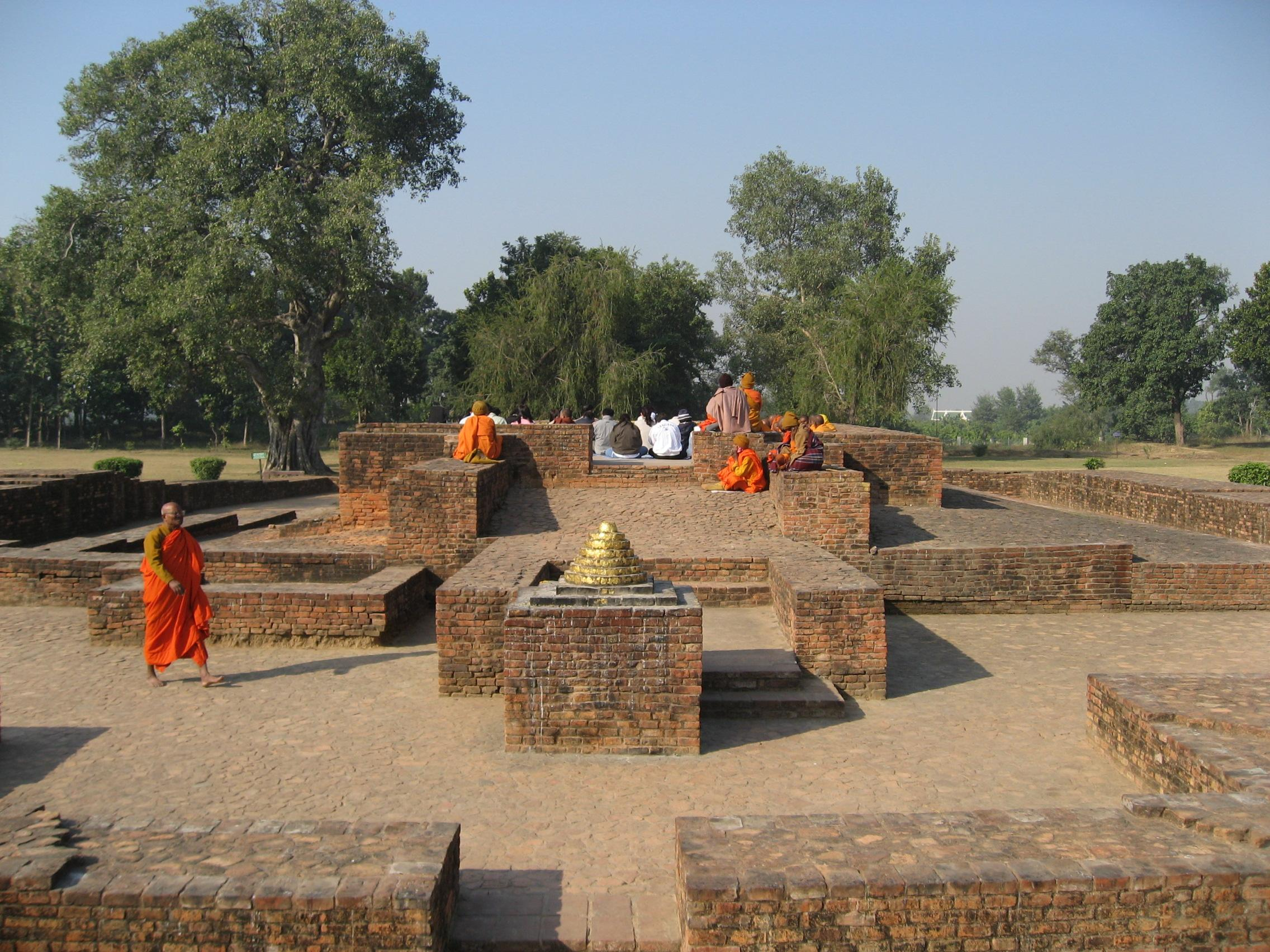
Xuanzang visited Sravasti site (above), the place where the Buddha spent most of his time after enlightenment.

From Shravasti, Xuanzang travelled southeast to the country of Kapilavastu. This country has no ruler, he states, and every city has its own lord. Well over a thousand monasteries were in this region, but most are dilapidated. Some three thousand monks continue to study Hinayana Buddhism in many of these monasteries. This country has two deva temples. He also describes a Buddhist temple with painting of a prince riding on a white horse, as well many Buddhist monuments and legends about the Buddha's early life in this region, as well as those of the Shakya clan.

After Kapilavastu, he went eastward to the country of Ramagrama (Rama). The region is sparsely populated, the towns and villages in a dilapidated condition. He mentions a stupa where a snake-dragon comes out of the pond to circumambulate it, as well as elephants pick flowers and come to scatter on this stupa, according to Xuanzang. There is a monastery near this special stupa, where monks study Hinayana. Some hundred li to the east is another colossal stupa in good condition, one built by Ashoka. Past this forest is the country of Kushinagara, where towns and villages are deserted and in a dilapidated condition. He describes a large brick temple with reclining Buddha. He describes many monuments and sites he was able to see where numerous legends of the Buddha played out, including the site where he was cremated.

In Fascicle 7, Xuanzang describes five countries. He starts with Baranasi, stating the country has Ganges river to its west. The city is densely populated, with tightly packed homes in its lanes. The people are "enormously wealthy", mild and courteous by nature. Few here believe in Buddhism, most are heretics (Hindus). The country has over thirty Buddhist monasteries with three thousand monks studying Hinayana. There are over one hundred deva temples, most dedicated to Mahesvara (Shiva). Some of these heretic followers go naked and smear their bodies with ash. On the west bank of Varana river near Baranasi, is a great stupa that is 100 feet tall and was built by Ashoka. Before it is a standing green-stone pillar polished as smooth as a mirror, states Xuanzang. He describes many more stupas, pillars and monasteries in Baranasi country.

After Baranasi, he visits the country of Garjanapati, where he finds the Aviddhakarna monastery that is "very exquisitely" carved with decorative sculptures. It is lush with flowers, with reflections in the pond nearby. From there he heads north of Ganges and visits a large Narayana temple. It has storied pavilions and terraces, the numerous deva statues are "carved from stone with the most exquisite craftsmanship". About thirty li to the east of this Narayana temple is an Ashoka built stupa, with a twenty feet high pillar and lion image on its top. From there he walked to Vaishali, where says Xuanzang, people are honest and simple by custom. They study both orthodox Buddhist and heterodox non-Buddhist doctrines. The country of Vaishali has hundreds of monasteries, but only a few have monks and are in good condition. He describes the Svetapura monastery with lofty buildings and magnificent pavilions.

After Vaishali, he headed north and reached the country of Vriji. This country mostly venerates the non-Buddhist deva temples and doctrines, states Xuanzang. It has over ten monasteries with less than a thousand Buddhist monks. He then travelled to the country of Nepala, near the Snow Mountains. It has many flowers and fruits, yaks and two-headed birds. The people here, says Xuanzang, are rude and disparaging by nature, but skilled in craftsmanship. Their Buddhist monasteries and deva temples touch each other, and people simultaneously believe in Buddhist and non-Buddhist doctrines. The country has two thousand monks who study Hinayana and Mahayana teachings.

==== Kingdoms of Magadha, Iranaparvata, Champa, Kajangala, Kamarupa ====
In Fascicle 8 of the travelogue, Xuanzang begins with the country of Magadha. The country and its capital is sparsely populated. A fertile land, it produces a fragrant form of rice with extraordinary lustre. It regularly floods during the monsoon season, and during these months one can use a boat to travel. People are honest and simple here, and they revere Buddhism. Magadha has fifty monasteries and over ten thousand monks. It also has tens of deva temples.

According to Xuanzang, there is city south of river Ganges in Magadha. It is very ancient. When human life was "innumerable years" long, it was called Kusumapura. One can see the very ancient foundations of Kusumapura. Later, when human life span reduced to "several thousand years", its name was changed to Pataliputra. Towards the north of his royal city is a huge standing pillar of Emperor Ashoka. There once were many monasteries, deva temples and stupas here, but several hundred such Buddhist and non-Buddhist monuments are in dilapidated and ruined condition, states Xuanzang.

He then describes several legends associated with Ashoka, along with several stupas and monasteries he found in good condition. For example, he describes the Tiladhaka monastery about 300 li southeast of the Magadha capital. It has four courts, lofty terraces, multi-storied pavilions where thousands of monks continue to study Mahayana Buddhism. Within this monastery complex, states Xuanzang, there are three temples, the center one with a thirty foot tall Buddha idol, another has a statue of Tara Bodhisattva, the third has a statue of Avalokitesvara Bodhisattva.

He visits Gaya and the Bodhi tree. Near the tree, he states there is the Mahabodhi monastery with many buildings and courtyards. Inside these buildings are "most wonderful, and exquisitely done decorative paintings", states Xuanzang. It is painted in gold, silver, pinkish blue, lustrous white and semitransparent pigments, with the Buddha's ornaments in the panel embedded with gems and jewels.

After crossing the Maha river, visiting many stupas, monasteries, Rishi Vyasa's hill, Vipula hill, Pippala Cave, Bamboo temple and other monuments, Xuanzang arrived in Rajagriha (present-day Rajgir) and Nalanda University. He stayed and studied at Nalanda.

At Nalanda, he was in the company of several thousand monks. Xuanzang studied logic, grammar, Sanskrit, and the Yogacara school of Buddhism during his time at Nalanda with Silabhadra. He describes Nalanda as a place with "azure pool winds around the monasteries, adorned with the full-blown cups of the blue lotus; the dazzling red flowers of the lovely kanaka hang here and there, and outside groves of mango trees offer the inhabitants their dense and protective shade" (translation of Rene Grousset).

According to Grousset, the founders of Mahayana idealism, Asanga and Vasubandhu trained Dignaga, who trained Dharmapala and whose student was Silabhadra. Thus Xuanzang had reached his teacher Silabhadra, who made available to Xuanzang and through him to the Sino-Japanese world the entire heritage of Buddhist Mahayana thought, and the Cheng Weishi Lun, Xuanzang's great philosophical treatise, is none other than the Summa of this doctrine, "the fruit of seven centuries of Indian Buddhist thought." In this scripture, Xuanzang appears to a certain extent as the continuator of both Asanga and Vasubandhu.

From Nalanda, Xuanzang travelled through several kingdoms, including Iranaparvata, Champa, from there to Pundravardhana and Sylhet (in present-day Bangladesh. There Xuanzang found 20 monasteries with over 3,000 monks studying both the Hinayana and the Mahayana. One of them was the Vāśibhã Monastery, where he found over 700 Mahayana monks from all over Eastern India. He visited Kamarupa (present-day Assam and northeastern India), Samatata, Tamralipti, Kalinga and other regions, which Xuanzang calls as "domain of east India".

==== Kingdoms of Kalinga, Multan, Andhra, Chola, Dravida and Malakuta ====
Xuanzang turned southward and travelled towards Andhradesa to visit the viharas at the Amaravati Stupa and Nagarjunakonda. He stayed at Amaravati and studied the Abhidhammapitakam texts. He observed that there were many viharas at Amaravati and some of them were deserted. He later proceeded to Kanchi, the capital of the Pallavas and has visited the Vaikunta Perumal Temple and also said that Kanchi was a strong center of Buddhism. He continued travelling to Nasik, Ajanta, Malwa; from there he went to Mulasthana and Pravata before returning to Nalanda again.

==== Kingdoms of Konkanapura, Maharashtra, Malawa, Valabhi, Gurjara, Ujjayani, Sindhu, Langala, Avanda, Varnu ====
Xuanzang was welcomed to Kanyakubja at the request of the Emperor Harshavardhana, who was an ally of Kumar Bhaskaravarman of Kamarupa, to attend a great Buddhist Sangha there which was also attended by both the monarchs as well as several others from neighboring kingdoms, Buddhist monks, Hindus, and Jains. Emperor Harsha invited Xuanzang to Kumbha Mela in Prayag where he witnessed the Emperor's generous distribution of gifts to the poor.

After visiting Prayag, he returned to the imperial capital of Kanyakubja where he was given a grand farewell by Emperor Harsha. Travelling through the Khyber Pass of the Uparisyena mountain range, Xuanzang passed through Kashgar, Khotan, and Dunhuang on his way back to China. He arrived in the capital, Chang'an, on the seventh day of the first month of 645, 16 years after he left Chinese territory, and a great procession celebrated his return.

Return journey

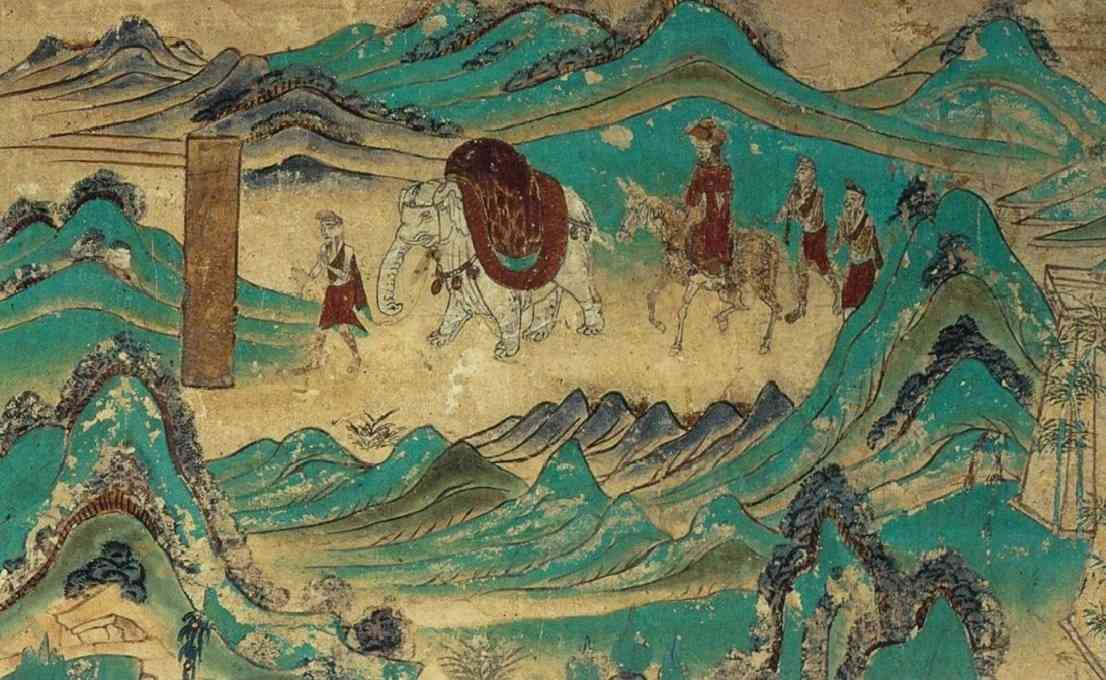
Eighth century Dunhuang cave mural depicting Xuanzang returning from India

Other sites

=== Return to China ===
On his return to China in 645 CE, Xuanzang was greeted with much honor but he refused all high civil appointments offered by the still-reigning emperor, Emperor Taizong of Tang. Instead, he retired to a monastery and devoted his energy to translating Buddhist texts until his death. He died on 5 February 664 CE in Yuhua Palace (玉華宮, in present-day Tongchuan, Shaanxi). According to his biography, he returned with "over six hundred Mahayana and Hinayana texts, seven statues of the Buddha and more than a hundred sarira relics." In celebration of Xuanzang's extraordinary achievement in translating the Buddhist texts, Emperor Gaozong of Tang ordered renowned Tang calligrapher Chu Suiliang (褚遂良) and inscriber Wan Wenshao (萬文韶) to install two stele stones, collectively known as The Emperor's Preface to the Sacred Teachings in Chinese (雁塔聖教序), at the Giant Wild Goose Pagoda.

== Chinese Buddhism (influence) ==
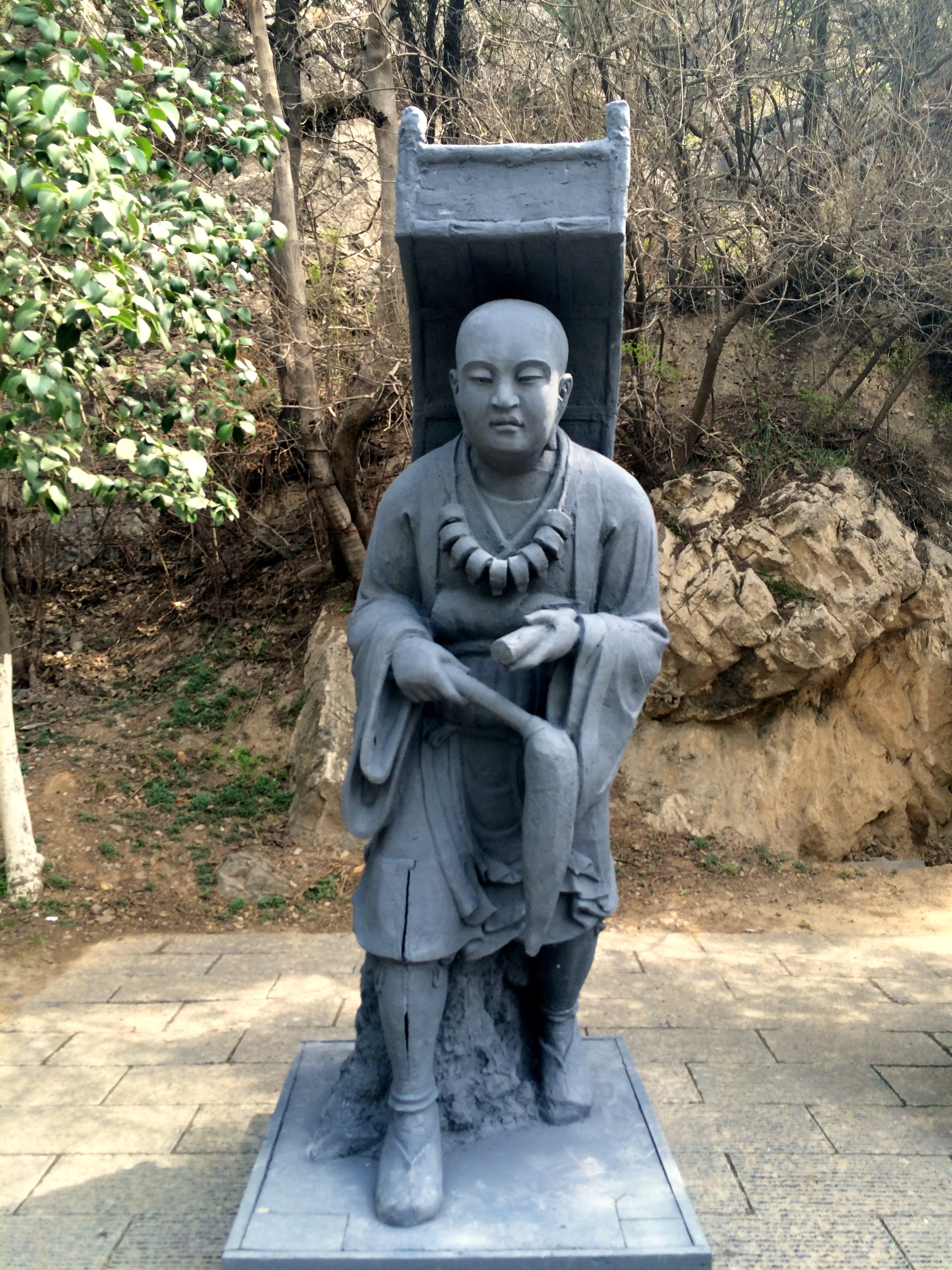
Statue of Xuanzang at Longmen Grottoes, Luoyang

During Xuanzang's travels, he studied with many famous Buddhist masters, especially at the famous center of Buddhist learning at Nalanda. When he returned, he brought with him some 657 Sanskrit texts. With the emperor's support, he set up a large translation bureau in Chang'an (present-day Xi'an), drawing students and collaborators from all over East Asia. He is credited with the translation of some 1,330 fascicles of scriptures into Chinese. His strongest personal interest in Buddhism was in the field of Yogācāra (瑜伽行派), or Consciousness-only (唯識), and he founded a school taking after that tradition in China. His 7th-century scholarship on Yogacara has a major influence on Chinese Buddhism, and then on East Asian Buddhism.

The force of his own study, translation, and commentary of the texts of these traditions initiated the development of the Faxiang school (法相宗) in East Asia. Some of Xuanzang's students, such as Kuiji (窺基, 632–682) and Wŏnch'ŭk (613–696), become influential authors in their own right. Although the Faxiang school itself did not thrive for a long time, its theories regarding perception, consciousness, Karma, rebirth, etc. found their way into the doctrines of other more successful schools. Xuanzang's closest and most eminent student was Kuiji (窺基) who became recognized as the first patriarch of the Faxiang school. Xuanzang's logic, as described by Kuiji, was often misunderstood by scholars of Chinese Buddhism because they lacked the necessary background in Indian logic.

Xuanzang was known for his extensive but careful translations of Indian Buddhist texts to Chinese, which have enabled subsequent recoveries of lost Indian Buddhist texts from the translated Chinese copies. He is credited with writing or compiling the Cheng Weishi Lun as a commentary on these texts. His translation of the Heart Sutra became and remains an important milestone in all East Asian Buddhist sects.

=== The Perfection of Wisdom Sutra ===
Xuanzang returned to China with three copies of the Mahaprajnaparamita Sutra. Xuanzang, with a team of disciple translators, commenced translating the voluminous work in 660 CE, using all three versions to ensure the integrity of the source documentation. Xuanzang was being encouraged by a number of his disciple translators to render an abridged version. After a suite of dreams quickened his decision, Xuanzang determined to render an unabridged, complete volume, faithful to the original of 600 chapters.

== Original works ==
Though Xuanzang is mainly known for his translation work, he also wrote a few original works.

In 646, under the Emperor's request, Xuanzang completed his book, Records of the Western Regions, which has become one of the primary sources for the study of medieval Central Asia and India. This book was first translated into French by the Sinologist Stanislas Julien in 1857.

Xuanzang also wrote a large treatise on Yogacara Buddhist philosophy, the Cheng Weishi Lun.

There is also another original text called Bashi guiju song 八識規矩頌 (Verses on the Structure of the Eight Consciousnesses).

There was also a biography of Xuanzang written by the monk Huili (慧立). Both books were first translated into English by Samuel Beal, in 1884 and 1911 respectively. An English translation with copious notes by Thomas Watters was edited by T.W. Rhys Davids and S.W. Bushell, and published posthumously in London in 1905.

=== Editions ===
- Watters, Thomas (1904). On Yuan Chwang's Travels in India, 629-645 A.D. Vol.1. Royal Asiatic Society, London. Volume 2. Reprint. Hesperides Press, 1996. ISBN 978-1-4067-1387-9.
- Beal, Samuel (1884). Si-Yu-Ki: Buddhist Records of the Western World, by Hiuen Tsiang. 2 vols. Translated by Samuel Beal. London. 1884. Reprint: Delhi. Oriental Books Reprint Corporation. 1969. Vol. 1, Vol. 2
- Julien, Stanislas, (1857/1858). Mémoires sur les contrées occidentales, L'Imprimerie impériale, Paris. Vol.1 Vol.2
- Li, Rongxi (translator) (1995). The Great Tang Dynasty Record of the Western Regions. Numata Center for Buddhist Translation and Research. Berkeley, California. ISBN 1-886439-02-8

== Legacy ==
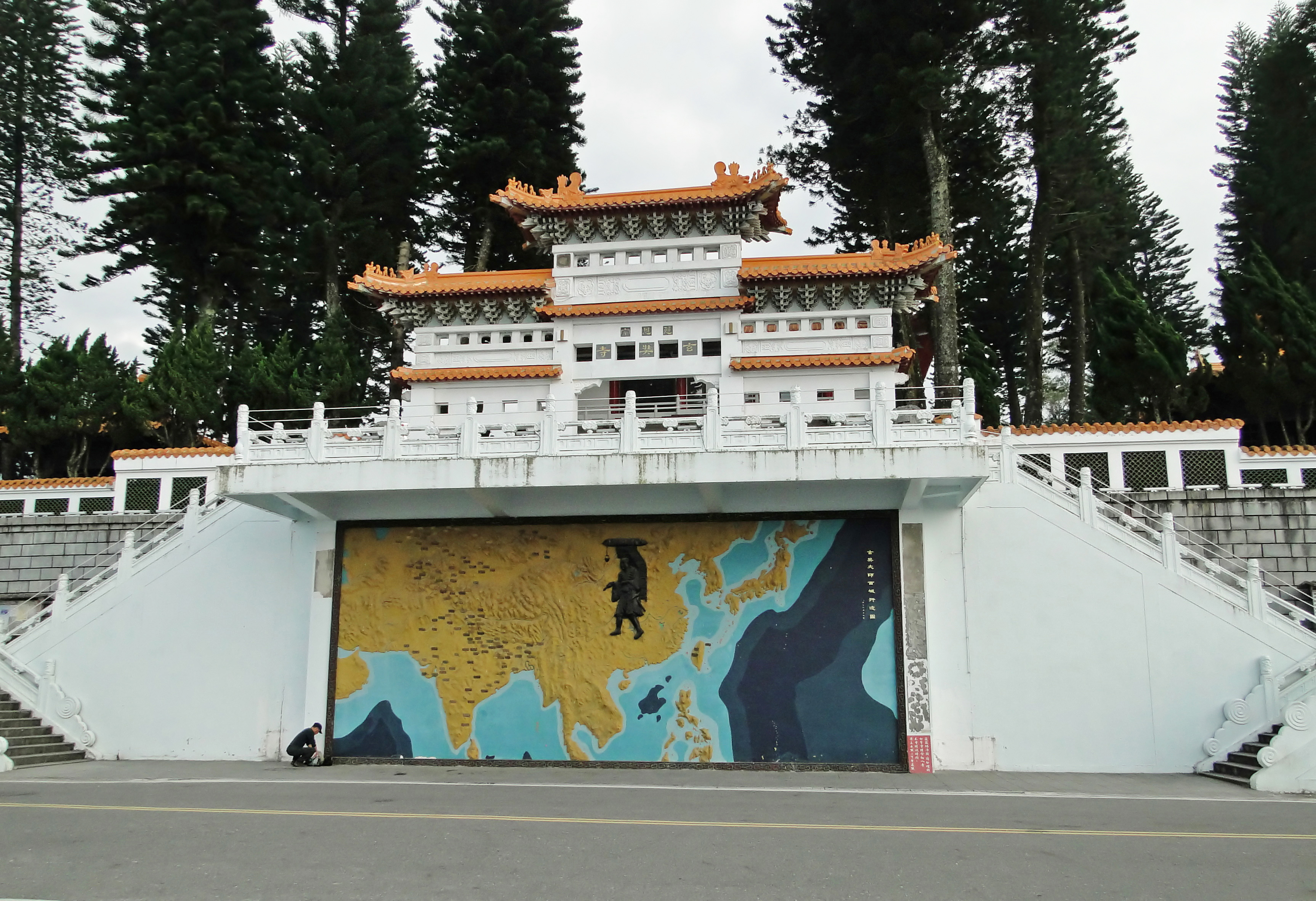
Xuanzang Temple in Taiwan

Xuanzang's Records of the Western Regions is the longest and most detailed account of the countries of Central and South Asia that has been bestowed upon posterity by a Chinese Buddhist pilgrim. While his main purpose was to obtain Buddhist books and to receive instruction on Buddhism while in India, he ended up doing much more. He has preserved the records of the political and social aspects of the lands he visited.

His record of the places visited by him in Bengal — mainly Raktamrittika near Karnasuvarna, Pundranagara and its environs, Samatata, Tamralipti and Harikela— have been very helpful in the recording of the archaeological history of Bengal. His account has also shed welcome light on the history of 7th century Bengal, especially the Gauda kingdom under Shashanka, although at times he can be quite partisan.

Xuanzang obtained and translated 657 Sanskrit Buddhist works. He received the best education on Buddhism he could find throughout India. Much of this activity is detailed in the companion volume to Xiyu Ji, the Biography of Xuanzang written by Huili, entitled the Life of Xuanzang.

His version of the Heart Sutra is the basis for all Chinese commentaries on the sutra, and recitations throughout China, Korea, Vietnam, and Japan. His style was, by Chinese standards, cumbersome and overly literal, and marked by scholarly innovations in terminology; usually, where another version by the earlier translator Kumārajīva exists, Kumārajīva's is more popular.

=== In fiction ===
Xuanzang's journey along the Silk Road, and the legends that grew up around it, inspired the Ming novel Journey to the West, one of the great classics of Chinese literature. The fictional counterpart Tang Sanzang is the reincarnation of the Golden Cicada, a disciple of Gautama Buddha, and is protected on his journey by four powerful disciples. One of them, the monkey, was a popular favorite and profoundly influenced Chinese culture and contemporary Japanese manga and anime (including the popular Dragon Ball and Saiyuki series), and became well known in the West by Arthur Waley's translation and later the cult TV series Monkey.

In the Yuan Dynasty, there was also a play by Wu Changling (吳昌齡) about Xuanzang obtaining scriptures.

The movie Xuanzang was released in 2016 as an official Chinese and Indian production. It was offered as candidate for Best Foreign Language Film at the 89th Academy Awards due to its camera work, but ultimately was not nominated.

=== Relics ===
A skull relic purported to be that of Xuanzang was held in the Temple of Great Compassion, Tianjin until 1956 when it was taken to Nalanda—allegedly by the Dalai Lama—and presented to India. The relic was in the Patna Museum for a long time but was moved to a newly built memorial hall in Nalanda in 2007. The Wenshu Monastery in Chengdu, Sichuan province also claims to have part of Xuanzang's skull.

Part of Xuanzang's remains were taken from Nanjing by soldiers of the Imperial Japanese Army in 1942, and are now enshrined at Yakushi-ji in Nara, Japan. In May 1956, some of the relics of Xuanzang were returned by the Japanese government to Taiwanese government, which agreed to allow the Japanese to retain the rest. The returned relics were eventually enshrined in Xuanzang Temple, Taiwan.

== Gallery ==
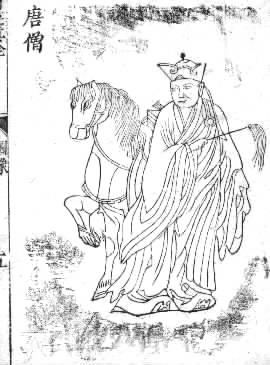
An illustration of Xuanzang from Journey to the West, a fictional account of travels.

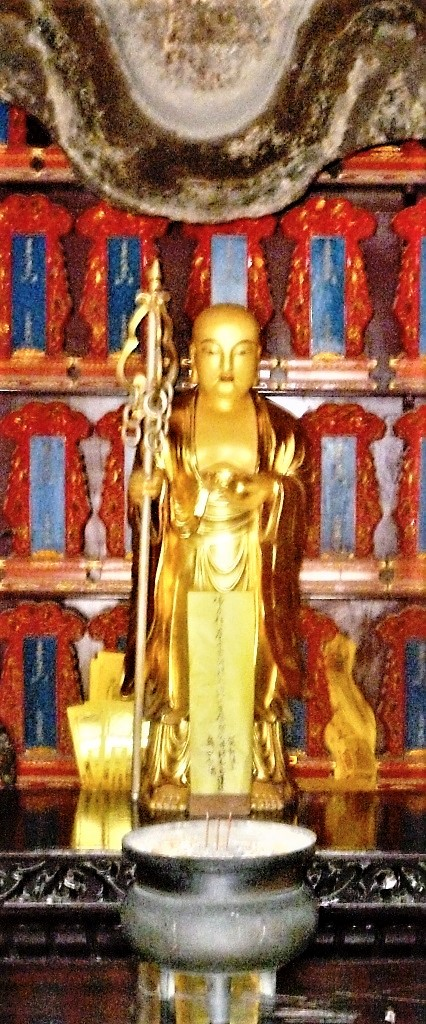
Golden statue of Xuanzang. Giant Wild Goose Pagoda, Xi'an

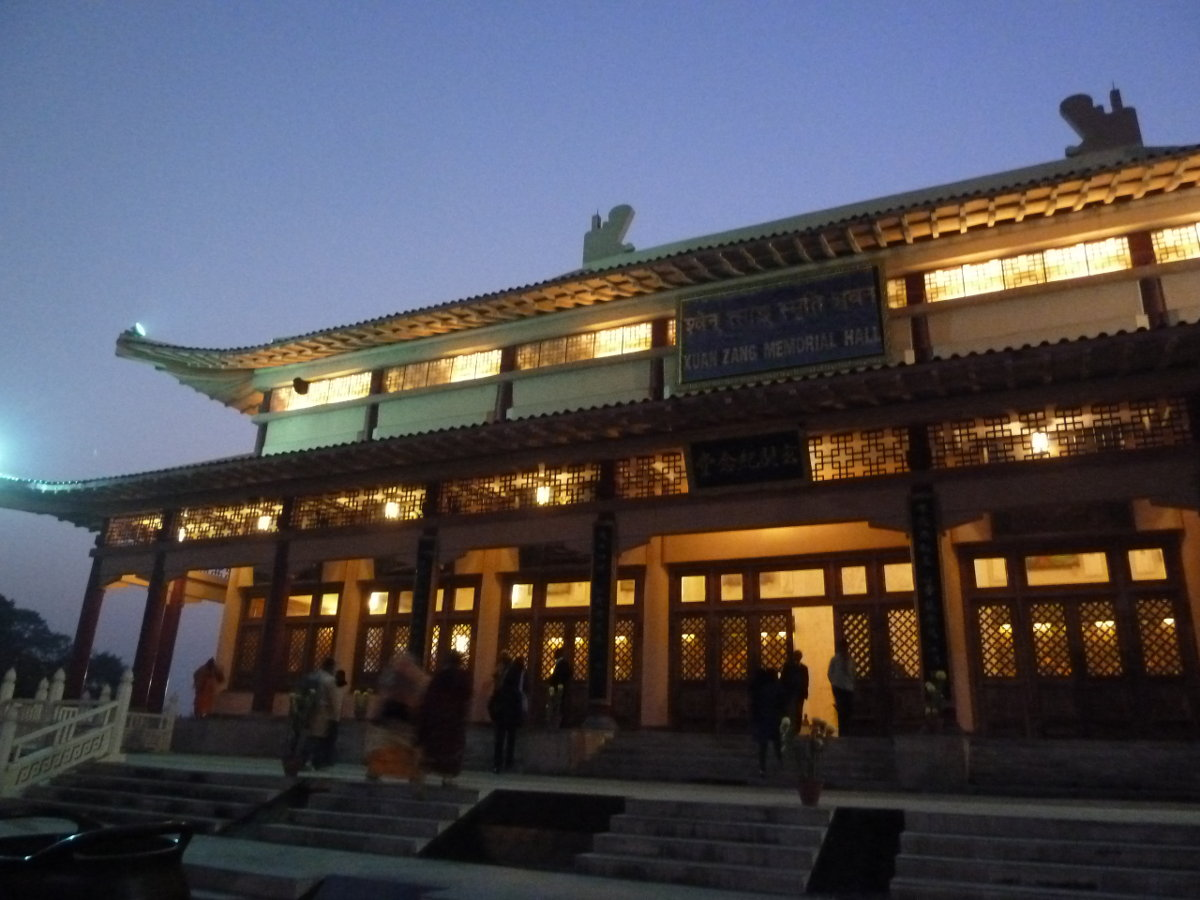
Xuanzang Memorial Hall in Nalanda, Bihar, India.

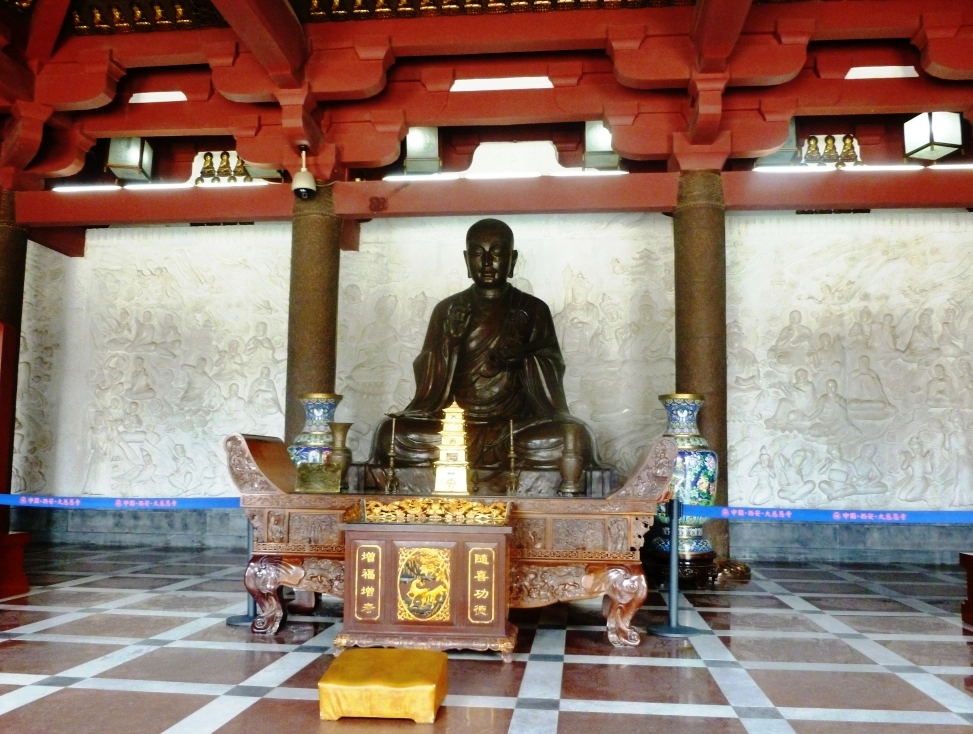
Statue of Xuanzang. Giant Wild Goose Pagoda, Xi'an.

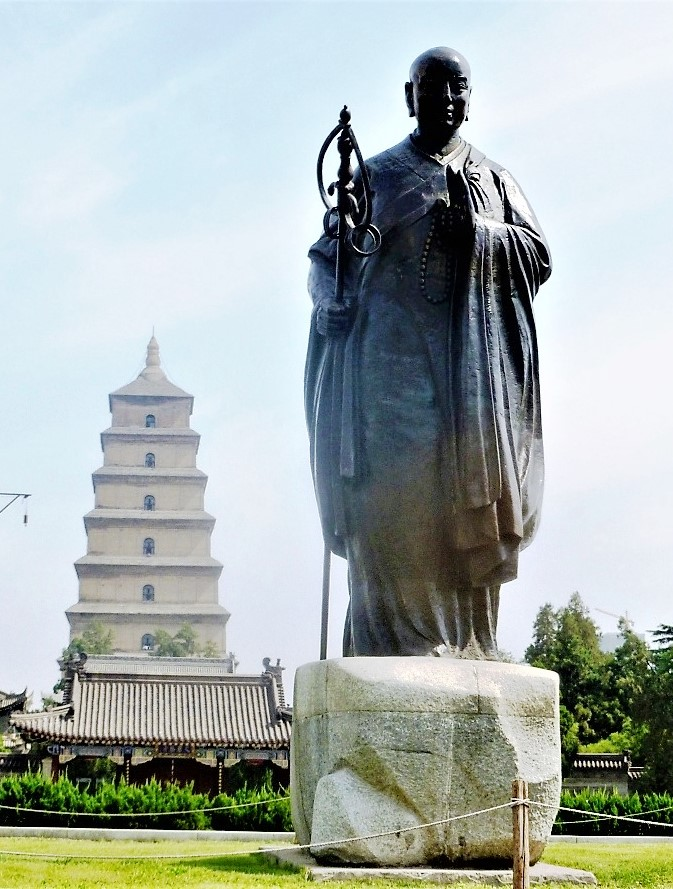
Statue of Xuanzang in front of Giant Wild Goose Pagoda, Xi'an

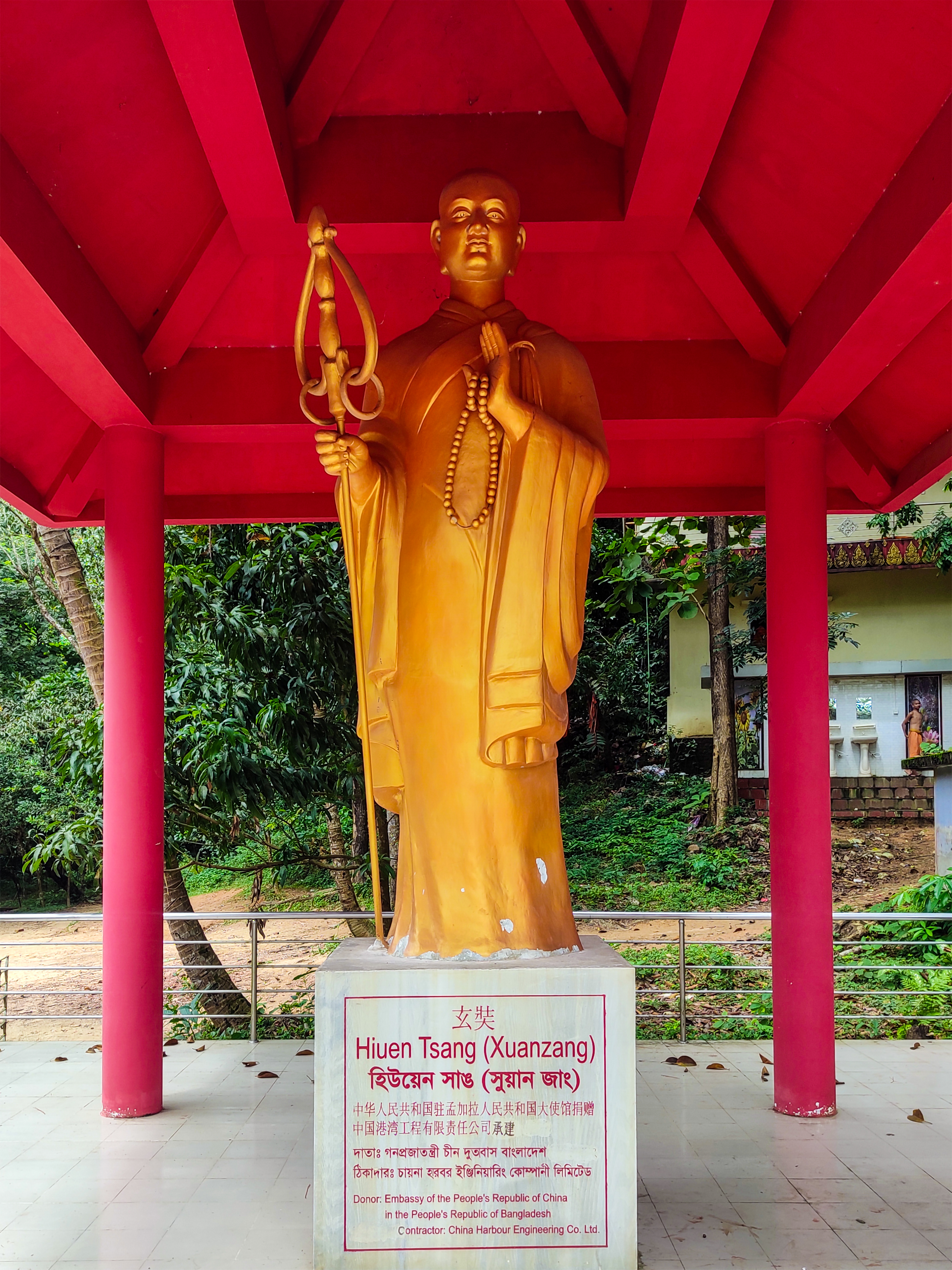
Statue of Xuanzang at Rangkut Banasram Pilgrimage Monastery in Bangladesh

== See also ==
- Cheng Weishi Lun
- Great Tang Records on the Western Regions
- Giant Wild Goose Pagoda
- Silk Road transmission of Buddhism
- Buddhist Hybrid Sanskrit
- Chinese Translation Theory
- Chinese exploration
- Faxian
- Song Yun
- Yijing
- Cimin Huiri
- Hyecho
- Xuanzang Temple, Nantou County, Taiwan
- A Record of Buddhist Practices Sent Home from the Southern Sea
