= Decline of Buddhism in the Indian subcontinent =

Gradual process of replacement of in India, ended around the 13th or 14th century

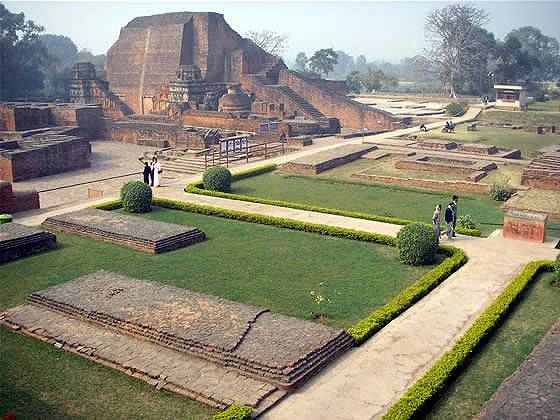
The Buddhist Nalanda university and monastery was a major institution of higher-learning in ancient India from the 5th century CE until the 12th century.

Buddhism, which originated in India, gradually dwindled in that region starting in the 4th–6th century CE, and was largely ousted by Hinduism approximately by the 12th century, in a centuries-long process. Lack of appeal among the rural masses, who instead embraced religious rituals and beliefs developed during the Hindu synthesis, as well as Turkic invasions and dwindling financial support from trading communities and royal elites, were major factors in the decline of Buddhism in its Indian homeland. Across many centuries, Buddhism largely spread to other regions of Asia.

The total Buddhist population in 2010 in South Asia – excluding that of Sri Lanka, Bhutan (both Buddhist majority states), and Nepal – was about 10 million, of which about 92.5% lived in India, 7.2% lived in Bangladesh and 0.2% in Pakistan.

== Growth of Buddhism ==
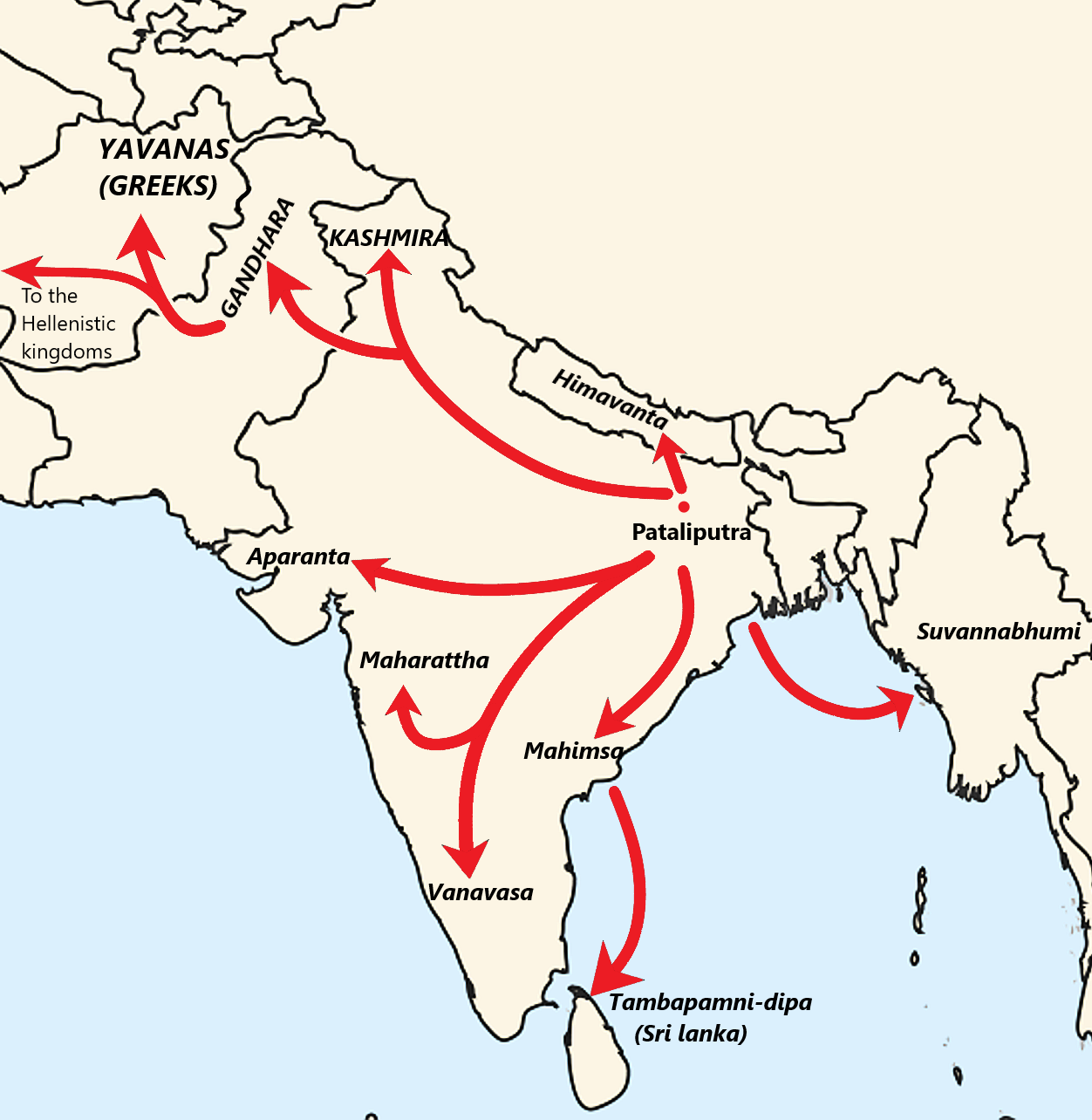
Map of the Buddhist missions during the reign of Ashoka.

Buddhism expanded in the Indian subcontinent in the centuries after the death of the Buddha, particularly after receiving the endorsement and royal support of the Maurya Empire under Ashoka in the 3rd century BCE. It spread even beyond the Indian subcontinent to Central Asia and China.

The Buddha's period saw not only urbanisation, but also the beginnings of centralised states. The successful expansion of Buddhism depended on the growing economy of the time, together with an increase in the number of centralised political organisations capable of change.

Buddhism spread across ancient India and state support by various regional regimes continued through the 1st millennium BCE. The consolidation of monastic organisations made Buddhism the centre of religious and intellectual life in India. The succeeding Kanva dynasty had four Buddhist Kanva Kings.

== Gupta Empire (4th–6th century) ==
=== Religious developments ===
During the Gupta Empire (4th to 6th century), Vaishnavism, Shaivism and other Hindu sects became increasingly popular, while Brahmins developed a new relationship with the state. The differences between Buddhism and Hinduism blurred, as Mahayana Buddhism adopted more ritualistic practices, while Buddhist ideas were adopted into Vedic schools. As the system grew, Buddhist monasteries gradually lost control of land revenue. In parallel, the Gupta emperors built Buddhist temples such as the one at Kushinagara, and monastic universities such as those at Nalanda, as evidenced by records left by three Chinese visitors to India.

=== Hun invasions (6th century) ===
Chinese scholars travelling through the region between the 5th and 8th centuries, such as Faxian, Xuanzang, Yijing, Huisheng, and Song Yun, began to speak of a decline of the Buddhist sangha in the northwestern parts of the Indian subcontinent, especially in the wake of the Hun invasion from Central Asia in the 6th century CE. Xuanzang wrote that numerous monasteries in northwestern India had been reduced to ruins by the Huns.

Mihirakula, the Alchon Hun ruler who ruled in the northwestern region of the Indian subcontinent, from 515–540 CE, was known for his persecution of Buddhists. He ordered the expulsion of monks and the destruction of many Buddhist monasteries throughout Gandhara, and even as far away as modern-day Prayagraj. Between 525 and 532 CE, Yashodharman (ruler of the Malava Empire) and rulers of the Gupta Empire reversed Mihirakula's campaign and ended the Mihirakula era.

The religion recovered slowly from these invasions during the 7th century, with the "Buddhism of Punjab and Sindh remaining strong". The reign of the Pala dynasty (8th to 12th century) saw Buddhism in North India recover due to royal support from the Palas, who supported various Buddhist centers like Nalanda. However, by the eleventh century, Pala rule had weakened.

== Socio-political change and religious competition ==
During the period of the Tripartite Struggle (7–12th centuries), most major and minor Indian dynasties gradually shifted their support towards various forms of Hinduism or Jainism (with the exception of the Palas).

The regionalisation of India after the end of the Gupta Empire (c. 320–579 CE) led to the loss of patronage and donations. The prevailing view of decline of Buddhism in India is summed by A. L. Basham's classic study which argues that the main cause was the rise of an ancient Hindu religion again, "Hinduism", which focused on the worship of deities like Shiva and Vishnu and became more popular among the common people while Buddhism, being focused on monastery life, had become disconnected from public life and its life rituals, which were all left to Hindu Brahmins.

=== Religious competition ===
The growth of new forms of Hinduism (and to a lesser extent Jainism) was a key element in the decline in Buddhism in India, particularly in terms of diminishing financial support to Buddhist monasteries from laity and royalty and also not having any support of kings . According to Kanai Hazra, Buddhism declined in part because of the rise of the Brahmins and their influence in socio-political process. According to Randall Collins, Richard Gombrich and other scholars, Buddhism's rise or decline is not linked to Brahmins or the caste system, since Buddhism was "not a reaction to the caste system", but aimed at the salvation of those who joined its monastic order.

The disintegration of central power also led to regionalisation of religiosity, and religious rivalry. Rural and devotional movements arose within Hinduism, along with Shaivism, Vaishnavism, Bhakti and Tantra, that competed with each other, as well as with numerous sects of Buddhism and Jainism. This fragmentation of power into feudal kingdoms was detrimental for Buddhism, as royal support shifted towards other communities and Brahmins developed a strong relationship with Indian states.

Over time the new Indian dynasties which arose after the 7th and 8th centuries tended to support Hinduism, and this conversion proved decisive. These new dynasties, all of which supported Hinduism, include "the Karkotas and Gurjara-Pratihara dynasty of the north, the Rashtrakutas of the Deccan, and the Pandyas and Pallavas of the south" (the Pala dynasty is one sole exception to these). One of the reasons of this conversion was that the Brahmins were willing and able to aid in local administration, and they provided councillors, administrators and clerical staff. Moreover, Brahmins had clear ideas about society, law and statecraft (and studied texts such as the Arthashastra and the Manusmriti) and could be more pragmatic than the Buddhists, whose religion was based on monastic renunciation and did not recognise that there was a special warrior class that was divinely ordained to use violence justly. As Johannes Bronkhorst notes, Buddhists could give "very little" practical advice in response to that of the Brahmins, and Buddhist texts often speak ill of kings and royalty.

Bronkhorst notes that some of the influence of the Brahmins derived from the fact that they were seen as powerful, because of their use of incantations and spells (mantras) as well as other sciences like astronomy, astrology, calendrics and divination. Many Buddhists refused to use such "sciences" and left them to Brahmins, who also performed most of the rituals of the Indian states (as well as in places like Cambodia and Myanmar).

Lars Fogelin argues that the concentration of the sangha into large monastic complexes like Nalanda was one of the contributing causes for the decline. He states that the Buddhists of these large monastic institutions became "largely divorced from day-to-day interaction with the laity, except as landlords over increasingly large monastic properties". Padmanabh Jaini also notes that Buddhist laypersons are relatively neglected in the Buddhist literature, which produced only one text on lay life and not until the 11th century, while Jains produced around fifty texts on the life and conduct of a Jaina layperson.

These factors all slowly led to the replacement of Buddhism in the South and West of India by Hinduism and Jainism. Fogelin states that:

While some small Buddhist centers still persisted in South and West India in the eleventh and twelfth centuries, for the most part, both monastic and lay Buddhism had been eclipsed and replaced by Hinduism and Jainism by the end of the first millennium CE.

Buddhist sources also mention violence against Buddhists by Hindu Brahmins and kings. Hazra mentions that the eighth and ninth centuries saw "Brahminical hostilities towards Buddhism in South India".

=== Religious convergence and absorption ===
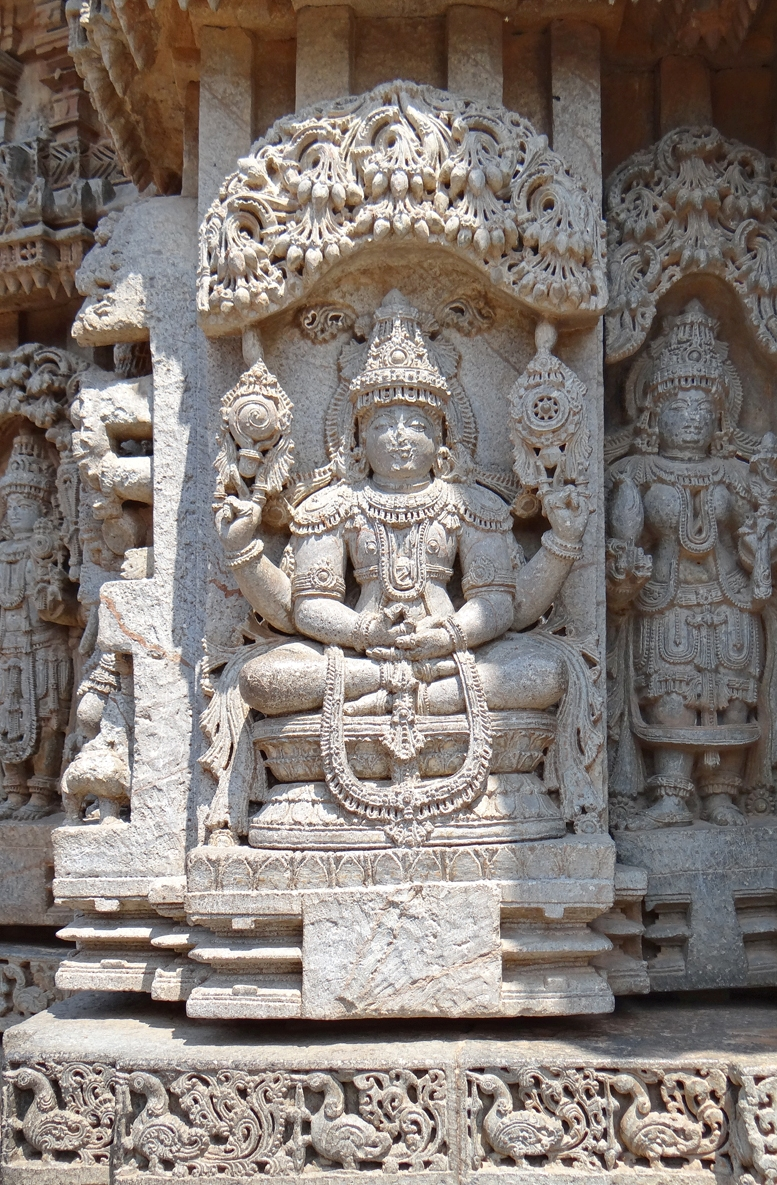
Buddha as Vishnu at Chennakesava Temple (Somanathapura).

Buddhism's distinctiveness also diminished with the rise of Hindu sects. Though Mahayana writers were quite critical of Hinduism, the devotional cults of Mahayana Buddhism and Hinduism likely seemed quite similar to laity, and the developing Tantrism of both religions were also similar. Also, "the increasingly esoteric nature" of both Hindu and Buddhist tantrism made it "incomprehensible to India's masses", for whom Hindu devotionalism and the worldly power-oriented Nath Siddhas became a far better alternative. (Note: Elverskog is quoting David Gordon White (2012), The Alchemical Body: Siddha Traditions in Medieval India, p.7, who writes: "The thirty-six or thirty-seven metaphysical levels of being were incomprehensible to India's masses and held few answers to their human concerns and aspirations." Yet, White is writing here about Hindu tantrism, and states that only the Nath Siddhas remained attractive, because of their orientation on worldly power.) Buddhist ideas, and even the Buddha himself, were absorbed and adapted into orthodox Hindu thought, while the differences between the two systems of thought were emphasised.

Elements which medieval Hinduism adopted during this time included vegetarianism, a critique of animal sacrifices, a strong tradition of monasticism (founded by figures such as Shankara) and the adoption of the Buddha as an avatar of Vishnu. On the other end of the spectrum, Buddhism slowly became more and more "Brahmanized", initially beginning with the adoption of Sanskrit as a means to defend their interests in royal courts. According to Bronkhorst, this move to the Sanskrit cultural world also brought with it numerous Brahmanical norms which now were adopted by the Sanskrit Buddhist culture (one example is the idea present in some Buddhist texts that the Buddha was a Brahmin who knew the Vedas). Bronkhorst notes that with time, even the caste system eventually became widely accepted for "all practical purposes" by Indian Buddhists (this survives among the Newar Buddhists of Nepal). Bronkhorst notes that eventually, a tendency developed in India to see Buddhism's past as having been dependent on Brahmanism and secondary to it. This idea, according to Bronkhorst, "may have acted like a Trojan horse, weakening this religion from within".

The political realities of the period also led some Buddhists to change their doctrines and practices. For example, some later texts such as the Mahāparinirvāṇa Sūtra and the Sarvadurgatipariśodhana Tantra begin to speak of the importance of protecting Buddhist teachings and that killing is allowed if necessary for this reason. Later Buddhist literature also begins to see kings as bodhisattvas and their actions as being in line with the dharma (Buddhist kings like Devapala and Jayavarman VII also claimed this). Bronkhorst also argues that the increase in the use of apotropaic rituals (including for the protection of the state and king) and spells (mantras) by 7th century Indian Buddhism is also a response to Brahmanical and Shaiva influence. These included fire sacrifices, which were performed under the rule of Buddhist king Dharmapala (r. c. 775–812). Alexis Sanderson has shown that Tantric Buddhism is filled with imperial imagery reflecting the realities of medieval India, and that in some ways work to sanctify that world. Perhaps because of these changes, Buddhism remained indebted to the crept in Brahmanical thought and practice now that it had adopted much of its world-view. Bronkhorst argues that these somewhat drastic changes "took them far from the ideas and practices they had adhered to during the early centuries of their religion, and dangerously close to their much-detested rivals." These changes which brought Buddhism closer to Hinduism, eventually made it much easier for it to be absorbed into Hinduism and lose its separate identity for them.

=== Patronage ===
In ancient India, regardless of the religious beliefs of their kings, states usually treated all the important sects relatively even-handedly. This consisted of building monasteries and religious monuments, donating property such as the income of villages for the support of monks, and exempting donated property from taxation. Donations were most often made by private persons such as wealthy merchants and female relatives of the royal family, but there were periods when the state also gave its support and protection. In the case of Buddhism, this support was particularly important because of its high level of organisation and the reliance of monks on donations from the laity. State patronage of Buddhism took the form of land grant foundations.

Numerous copper plate inscriptions from India as well as Tibetan and Chinese texts suggest that the patronage of Buddhism and Buddhist monasteries in medieval India was interrupted in periods of war and political change, but broadly continued in Hindu kingdoms from the start of the common era through the early first millennium CE. The Gupta kings built Buddhist temples such as the one at Kushinagara, and monastic universities such as those at Nalanda, as evidenced by records left by three Chinese visitors to India.

=== Internal social-economic dynamics ===
According to some scholars such as Lars Fogelin, the decline of Buddhism may be related to economic reasons, wherein the Buddhist monasteries with large land grants focused on non-material pursuits, self-isolation of the monasteries, loss in internal discipline in the sangha, and a failure to efficiently operate the land they owned. With the growing support for Hinduism and Jainism, Buddhist monasteries also gradually lost control of land revenue.

== Turkic invasions and conquest (10th to 12th century) ==
=== Invasions ===
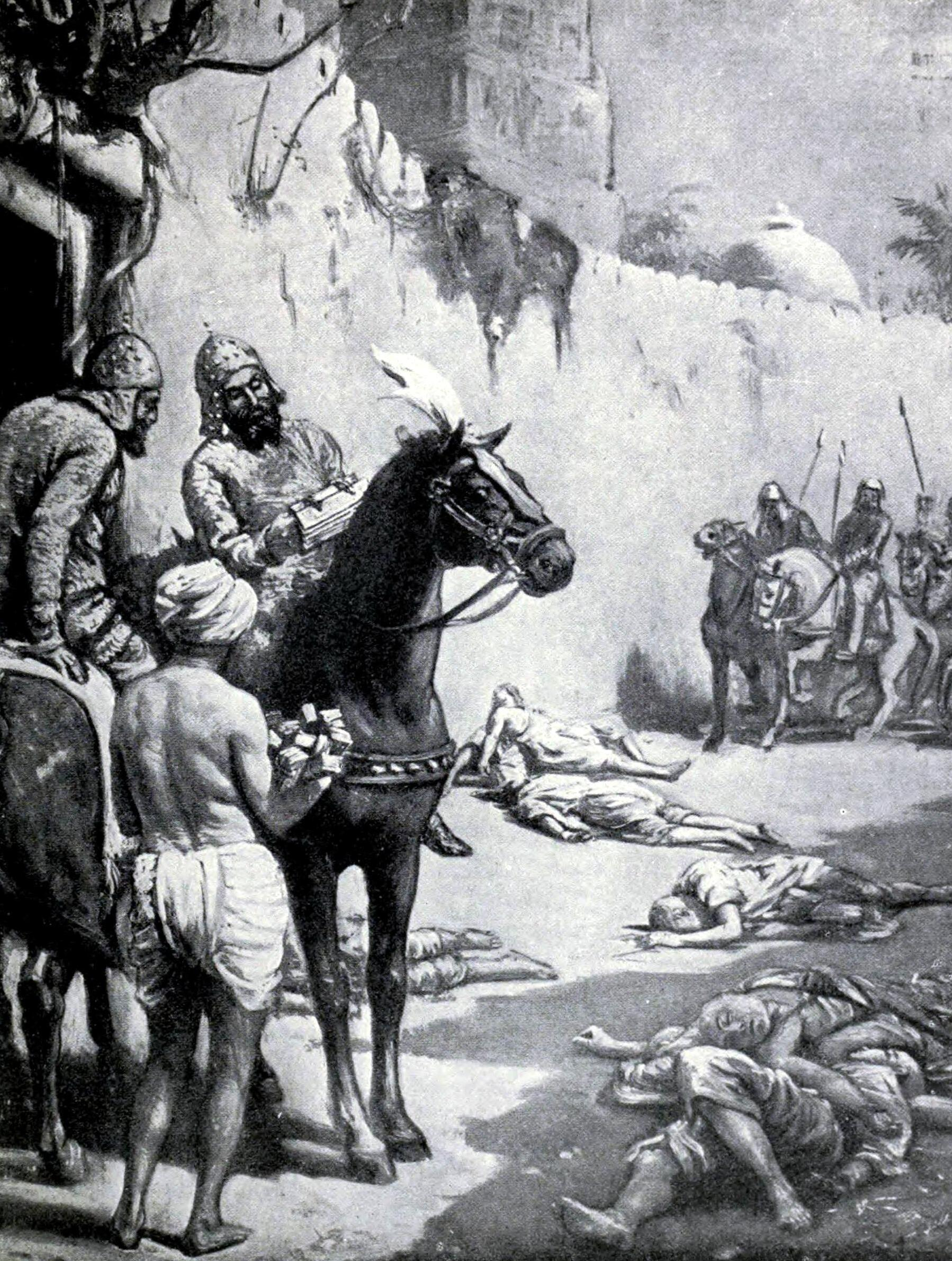
The image, in the chapter on India in Hutchison's Story of the Nations edited by James Meston, depicts the Turkic general Muhammad Bakhtiyar Khalji's massacre of Buddhist monks in Bihar. Khalji destroyed the Nalanda and Vikramshila universities during his raids across North Indian plains, massacring many Buddhist and Brahmin scholars.

According to Peter Harvey:

From 986 CE, the Turks started raiding northwest India from Afghanistan, plundering western India early in the eleventh century. Forced conversions to Islam were made, and Buddhist images smashed, due to the Islamic dislike of idolatry. Indeed in India, the Islamic term for an 'idol' became 'budd'.

— Peter Harvey, An Introduction to Buddhism

The Muslim conquests in the Indian subcontinent was the first great iconoclastic invasion into the Indian subcontinent. As early as the 8th century, Arab conquerors invaded present-day Pakistan. In a second wave, from the 11th through the 13th centuries, Turkic, Turkic-Mongolian and Mongolian overtook the northern Indian plains. The Persian traveller Al Biruni's memoirs suggest Buddhism had vanished from Ghazni (Afghanistan) and medieval Punjab region (northern Pakistan) by the early 11th century. By the end of the twelfth century, Buddhism had further disappeared, with the destruction of monasteries and stupas in the north-west and western parts of the Indian subcontinent. The chronicler of Shahubuddin Ghori's forces records enthusiastically about attacks on the monks and students and victory against the non-Muslims. The major centers of Buddhism were in north India and the direct path of the armies. As centers of wealth and non-Muslim religions they were targets. Buddhist sources agree with this assessment. Taranatha in his History of Buddhism in India of 1608, gives an account of the last few centuries of Buddhism, mainly in Eastern India. Mahayana Buddhism reached its zenith during the Pala dynasty period, a dynasty that ended with the Islamic invasion of the Gangetic plains.

According to William Johnston, hundreds of Buddhist monasteries and shrines were destroyed, Buddhist texts were burnt by the armies, monks and nuns killed during the 12th and 13th centuries in the Gangetic plains region. The Islamic invasions plundered wealth and destroyed Buddhist images.

The Buddhist university of Nalanda was mistaken for a fort because of the walled campus. The Buddhist monks who had been slaughtered were mistaken for Brahmins according to Minhaj-i-Siraj. The walled town, the Odantapuri monastery, was also conquered by his forces. Sumpa basing his account on that of Śākyaśrībhadra who was at Magadha in 1200, states that the Buddhist university complexes of Odantapuri and Vikramshila were also destroyed and the monks massacred. forces attacked the north-western regions of the Indian subcontinent many times. Many places were destroyed and renamed. For example, Odantapuri's monasteries were destroyed in 1197 by Muhammad bin Bakhtiyar Khilji and the town was renamed. Likewise, Vikramashila was destroyed by the forces of Muhammad bin Bakhtiyar Khilji around 1200. Many Buddhist monks fled to Nepal, Tibet, and South India to avoid the consequences of war. Tibetan pilgrim Chöjepal (1179–1264), who arrived in India in 1234, had to flee advancing troops multiple times, as they were sacking Buddhist sites.

The north-west parts of the Indian subcontinent fell to Islamic control, and the consequent take over of land holdings of Buddhist monasteries removed one source of necessary support for the Buddhists, while the economic upheaval and new taxes on laity sapped the laity support of Buddhist monks. Not all monasteries were destroyed by the invasions (e.g. Somapura, Lalitagiri, Udayagiri), but since these large Buddhist monastic complexes had become dependent on the patronage of local authorities, when this patronage dissipated, they were abandoned by the sangha.

In the north-western parts of medieval India, the Himalayan regions, as well as regions bordering central Asia, Buddhism once facilitated trade relations, states Lars Fogelin. With the Islamic invasion and expansion, and central Asians adopting Islam, the trade route-derived financial support sources and the economic foundations of Buddhist monasteries declined, on which the survival and growth of Buddhism was based. The arrival of Islam removed the royal patronage to the monastic tradition of Buddhism, and the replacement of Buddhists in long-distance trade eroded the related sources of patronage.

=== Re-assessing impact of invasions ===
However, according to some scholars, fresh re-assessments of evidence from archaeology in addition to historical records have disputed this view of Muslim invasions as the major cause of the decline of Buddhism in India or the destruction of Buddhist sites — arguing, instead, "that Brahmanical hostility toward Buddhists resulted in the destruction of Sarnath and other sites". According to archaeologist Giovanni Verardi: "Contrary to what is usually believed, the great monasteries of Gangetic India, from Sarnath to Vikramaśīla, from Odantapurī to Nālandā, were not destroyed by the Muslims, but appropriated and transformed by the Brahmans with only the occasional intervention of the Muslim forces". According to Verardi, "orthodox" Brahmins — who had been gaining in power and influence during the Gahadavala (11th-12th c.) and Sena dynasties (11th-12th c.), the rival Hindu-revivalist dynasties of northern/eastern India — "accepted Muslim rule in exchange for the extirpation of Buddhism and the repression of the social sectors in revolt." Archaeologist Federica Barba writes that the Gahadavala Rajputs built large Hindu temples in traditional Buddhist sites such as Sarnath, and converted Buddhist shrines into Brahmanical ones: Evidence indicates that Buddhists had been expelled from Sarnath during the mid 12th-century, under the Gahadavala rule, and it already was in the process of being converted to a large Shiva temple compound before Muslim invaders arrived. During Sena rule in Bengal many Buddhists migrated from Bengal as a whole to eastern Bengal crossing Meghna River due to persecution by the Hindus.

=== Decline under Islamic rule ===
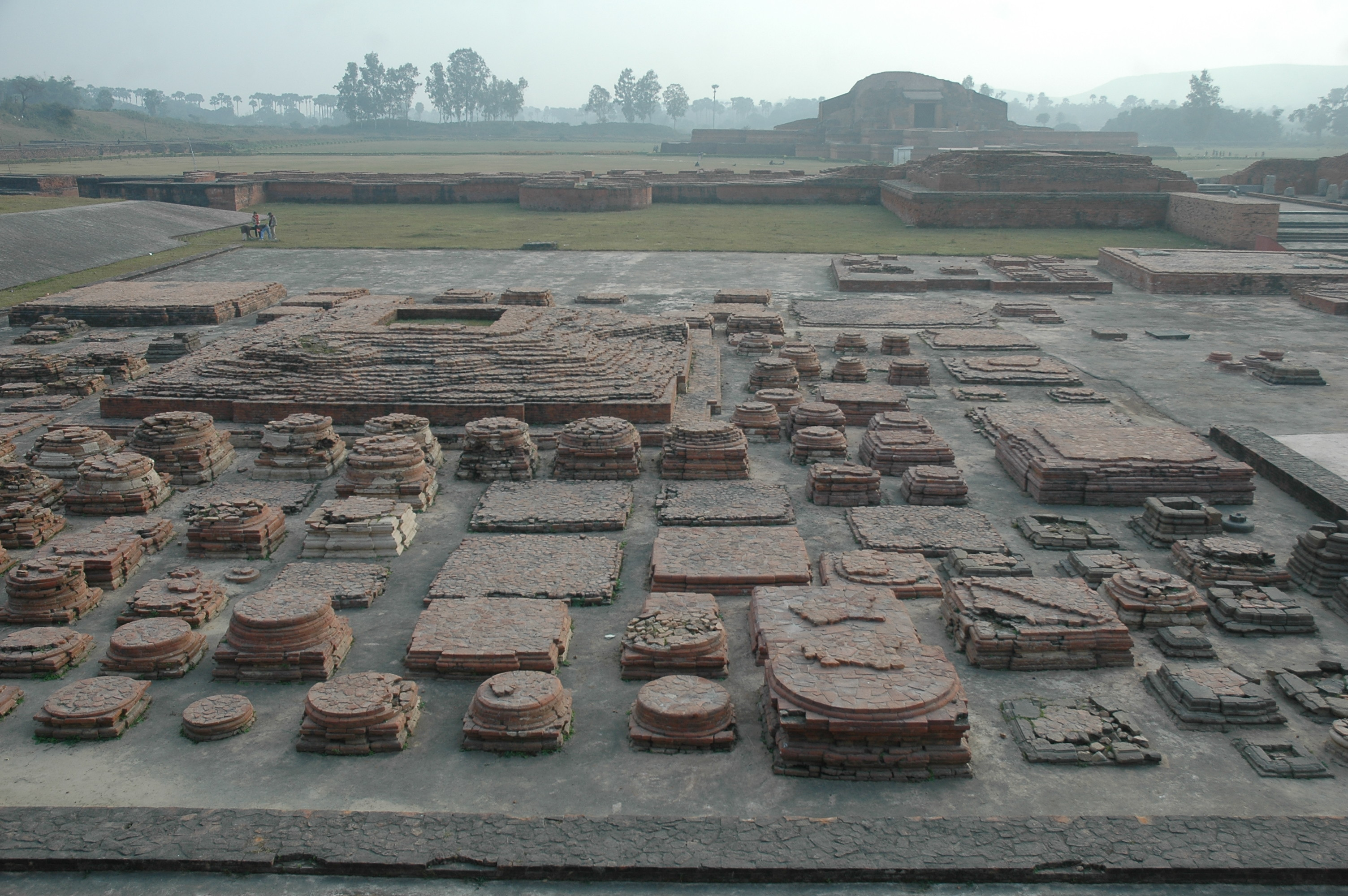
Ruins of Vikramashila, it was one of the most important centers of learning, during the Pala Empire, established by Emperor Dharmapala. Atiśa, the renowned pandita, is sometimes listed as a notable abbot.

After the conquest, Buddhism largely disappeared from most of India, surviving in the Himalayan regions and south India. Abul Fazl stated that there was scarcely any trace of Buddhists left. When he visited Kashmir in 1597, he met with a few old men professing Buddhism, however, he "saw none among the learned".

According to Randall Collins, Buddhism was already declining in India by the 12th century, but with the pillage by invaders it nearly became extinct in India in the 1200s. In the 13th century, states Craig Lockard, Buddhist monks in India escaped to Tibet to escape Islamic persecution; while the monks in western India, states Peter Harvey, escaped persecution by moving to south Indian Hindu kingdoms that were able to resist the power.

Brief accounts and the one eye-witness account of Dharmasmavim in wake of the conquest during the 1230s talk about abandoned viharas being used as camps by the Turukshahs. Later historical traditions such as Taranatha's are mixed with legendary materials and summarised as "the Turukshah conquered the whole of Magadha and destroyed many monasteries and did much damage at Nalanda, such that many monks fled abroad" thereby bringing about a demise of Buddhism with their destruction of the Viharas.

While they sacked the Buddhists viharas, the temples and stupas with little material value survived. After the collapse of monastic Buddhism, Buddhist sites were abandoned or reoccupied by other religious orders. In the absence of viharas and libraries, scholastic Buddhism and its practitioners migrated to the Himalayas, China and Southeast Asia. The devastation of agriculture also meant that many laypersons were unable to support Buddhist monks, who were easily identifiable and also vulnerable. As the Sangha died out in numerous areas, it lacked the ability to revive itself without more monks to perform ordinations. Peter Harvey concludes:

Between the alien, with their doctrinal justification of "holy war" to spread the faith, and Hindus, closely identified with Indian culture and with a more entrenched social dimension, the Buddhists were squeezed out of existence. Lay Buddhists were left with a folk form of Buddhism, and gradually merged into Hinduism, or converted to Islam. Buddhism, therefore, died out in all but the fringes of its homeland, though it had long since spread beyond it.

Fogelin also notes that some elements of the Buddhist sangha moved to the Himalayas, China, and Southeast Asia, or they may have reverted to secular life or become wandering ascetics. In this environment, without monasteries and scholastic centers of their own, Buddhist ascetics and laypersons were eventually absorbed into the religious life of medieval India.

== Survival of Buddhism in the Indian subcontinent ==
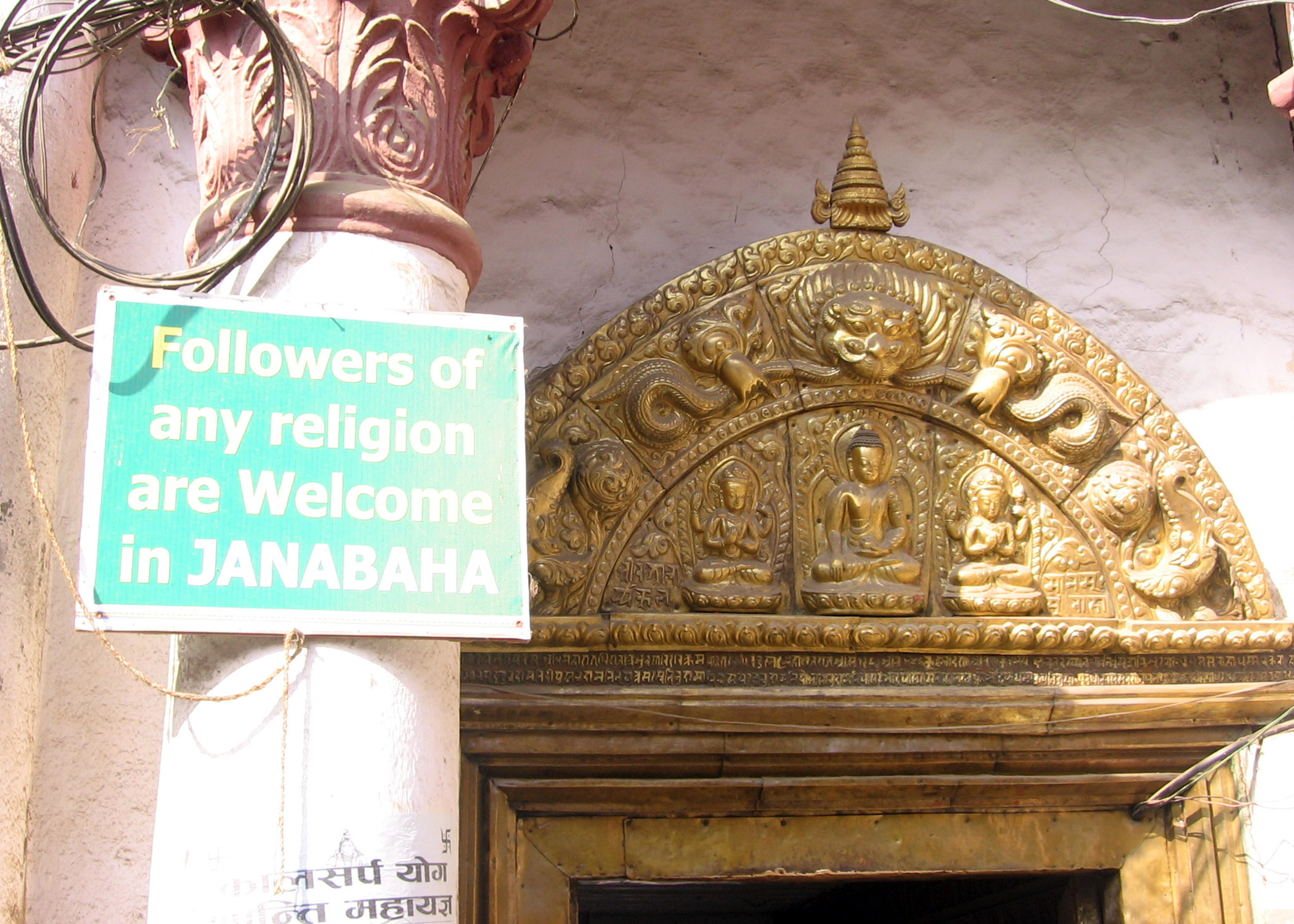
Entrance to Buddhist Jana Baha, Kel Tol, Kathmandu

Buddhist institutions survived in eastern India right until the Islamic invasion. Buddhism still survives among the Barua (though practising Vaishnavite elements), a community of Arakanese descent who migrated to Chittagong region, but who call themselves Magh (Magadh descent) in oral tradition. Indian Buddhism also survives among Newars of Nepal, who practice unique form of Vajrayana known as Newar Buddhism and among the weavers of the villages of Maniabandha and Nuapatna in the Cuttack District of Odisha, a long-isolated region.

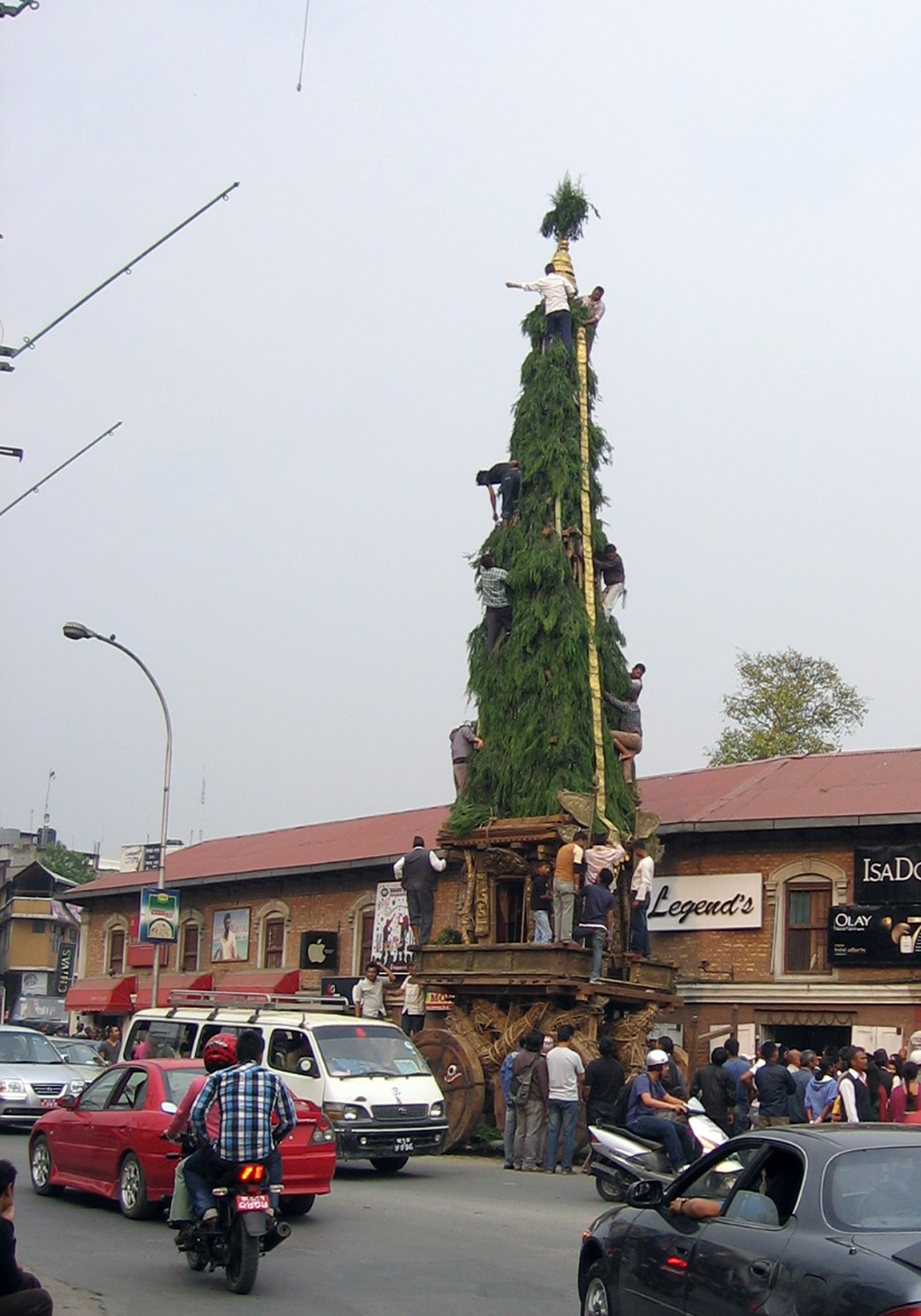
Procession of Jana Baha Dyah Jatra, the Bodhisattva of compassion in Kathmandu

In Bihar and Bengal, many Buddhist shrines and temples have remained intact with the Buddha or Bodhisattva inside being reappropriated and worshipped as a Brahmanical deity. Around the neighbourhood of Nalanda, the remains of votive stupas are worshipped as Shiva lingas. An image of the Buddha in bhūmisparśa mudrā at the village of Telhara receives full-fledged pūjā as Hanuman during Rama Navami. A sculpture of the Buddha has ended up as Vāsudeva at Gunaighar in Comilla.

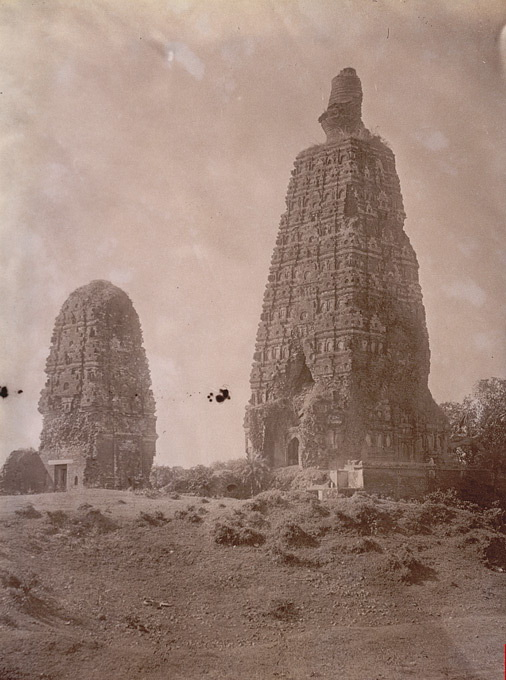
Mahabodhi Temple, Bodh Gaya, before the 19th century restoration

While the Buddhist monastic centers like Nalanda had been sacked, the temples and stupas at pilgrimage sites (such as Bodh Gaya) didn't receive the same treatment. The reason these were left unharmed was because they were "not material legitimations of rival royal families". The last abbot of Bodh Gaya Mahavihara was Sariputra who was active during the 14th and 15th centuries before he left India for Nepal. Inscriptions at Bodh Gaya show that the Mahabodhi Temple was in some use till 14th century. According to the 17th century Tibetan Lama Taranatha's History of Buddhism in India, the temple was restored by a Bengali queen in the 15th century, later passing on to a landowner and becoming a Shaivite center. Inscriptions at Bodh Gaya mention Buddhist pilgrims visiting it throughout the period of Buddhist decline:

- 1302–1331: Several groups from Sindh
- 15th or 16th century: a pilgrim from Multan
- 15th century, monk Budhagupta from South India
- 16th century Abhayaraj from Nepal
- 1773 Trung Rampa, a representative of the Panchen Lama from Tibet, welcomed by Maharaja of Varanasi
- 1877, Burmese mission sent by King Mindon Min

Abul Fazl, the courtier of Mughal emperor Akbar, states, "For a long time past scarce any trace of them (the Buddhists) has existed in Hindustan." When he visited Kashmir in 1597 he met with a few old men professing Buddhism, however, he 'saw none among the learned'. This can also be seen from the fact that Buddhist priests were not present amidst learned divines that came to the Ibadat Khana of Akbar at Fatehpur Sikri.

After the Islamization of Kashmir by sultans like Sikandar Butshikan, much of Hinduism was gone and a little of Buddhism remained. Fazl writes, "The third time that the writer accompanied His Majesty to the delightful valley of Kashmir, he met a few old men of this persuasion (Buddhism), but saw none among the learned."

'Abd al-Qadir Bada'uni mentions, "Moreover samanis and Brahmans managed to get frequent private audiences with His Majesty." The term samani (Sanskrit: Sramana and Prakrit: Samana) refers to a devotee a monk. Irfan Habib states that while William Henry Lowe assumes the Samanis to be Buddhist monks, they were Jain ascetics.

Taranatha's history which mentions Buddhist sangha surviving in some regions of India during his time which includes Konkana, Kalinga, Mewad, Chittor, Abu, Saurastra, Vindhya mountains, Ratnagiri, Karnataka etc. A Jain author Gunakirti (1450–1470) wrote a Marathi text, Dhamramrita, where he gives the names of 16 Buddhist orders. Dr. Johrapurkar noted that among them, the names Sataghare, Dongare, Navaghare, Kavishvar, Vasanik and Ichchhabhojanik still survive in Maharashtra as family names.

Buddhism survived in Gilgit and Baltistan until 13–14th century, perhaps slightly longer in the nearby Swat Valley. In Ladakh region, adjacent to Kashmir valley, Tibetan Buddhism survives to this day. The historic prevalence and history of Tibetan Buddhism in the above-mentioned northern regions of Kashmir is reported in the Rajatarangini of Kalhana written in 1150/1 CE. It survived in the Kashmir Valley at least until the introduction of Islam in 1323 by the Ladakhi Rinchana, who as King of Kashmir converted to Islam, and even beyond, into the 15th century, when King Zain ul Abidin (1419–1470) had a Buddhist minister.

In Tamil Nadu and Kerala, Buddhism survived until 15–16th century, as witnessed by the manuscript of the Manjusrimulakalpa. At Nagapattinam, in Tamil Nadu, Buddhist icons were cast and inscribed until this time, and the ruins of the Chudamani Vihara stood until they were destroyed by the Jesuits in 1867. In the South in some pockets, it may have survived even longer.

Buddhism was virtually extinct in British Raj by the end of the 19th century, except its Himalayan region, east and some niche locations. According to the 1901 census of British India, which included modern Bangladesh, India, Burma, and Pakistan, the total population was 294.4 million, of which total Buddhists were 9.5 million. Excluding Burma's nearly 9.2 million Buddhists in 1901, this colonial-era census reported 0.3 million Buddhists in Bangladesh, India, and Pakistan in the provinces, states and agencies of British India or about 0.1% of the total reported population.

The 1911 census reported a combined Buddhist population in British India, excluding Burma, of about 336,000 or about 0.1%.

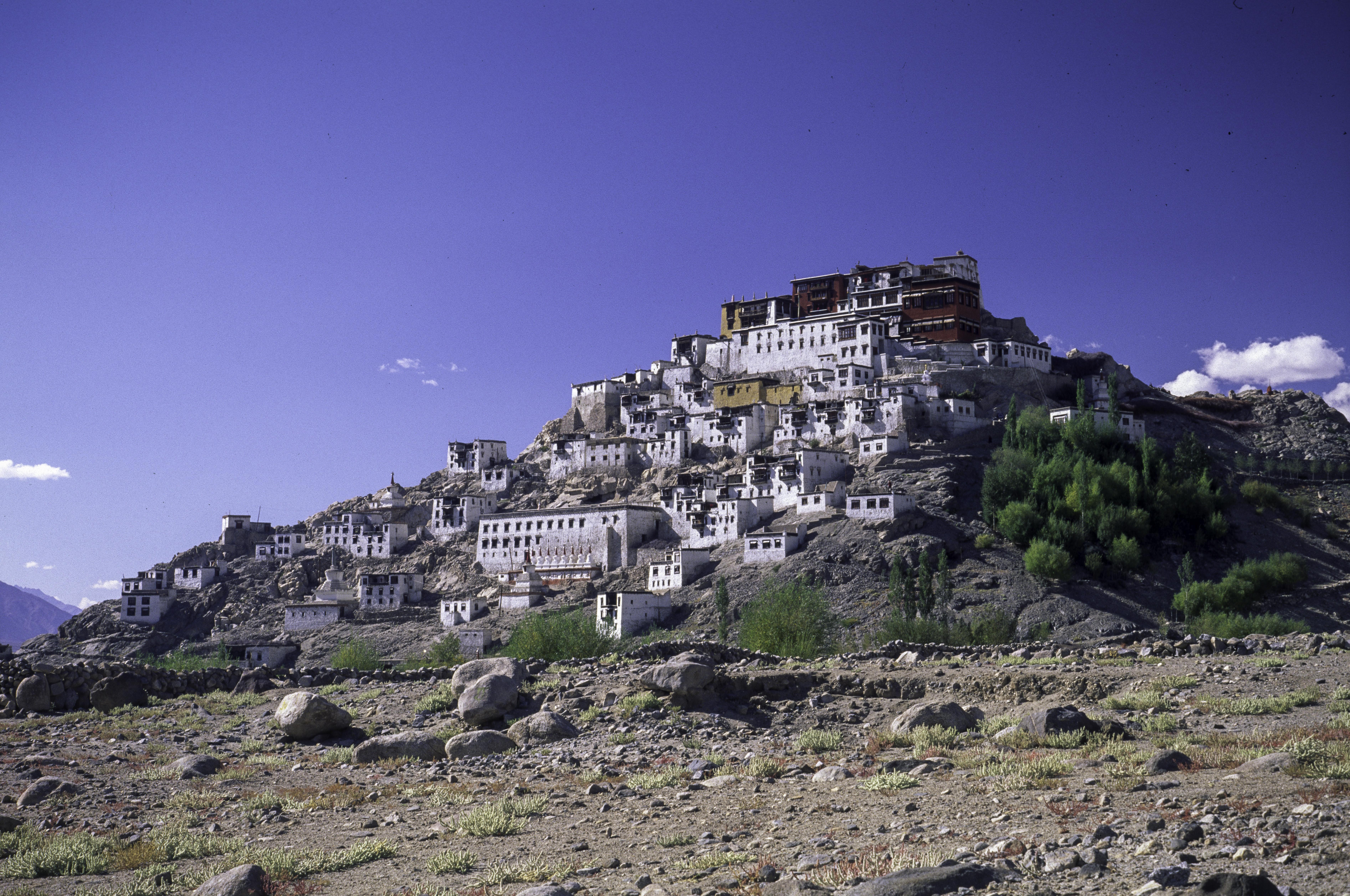
Thikse Monastery is the largest gompa in Ladakh, built in the 1500s.

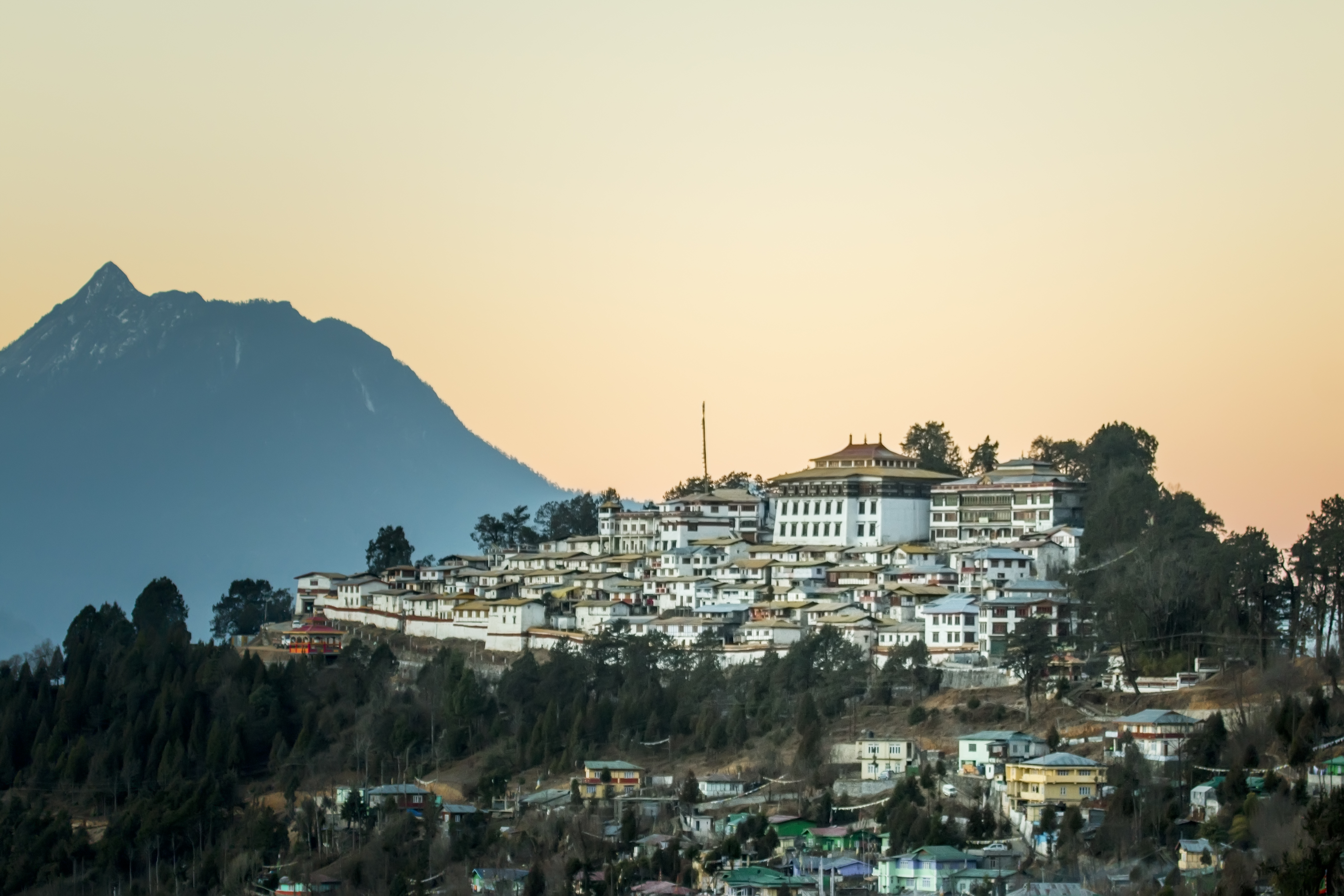
Tawang Monastery in Arunachal Pradesh, was built in the 1600s, is the largest monastery in India and second-largest in the world after the Potala Palace in Lhasa, Tibet.

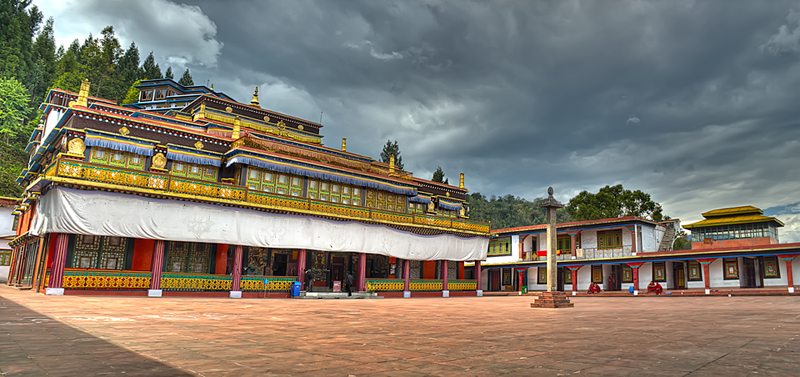
Rumtek Monastery in Sikkim was built under the direction of Changchub Dorje, 12th Karmapa Lama in the mid-1700s.

== Revival ==
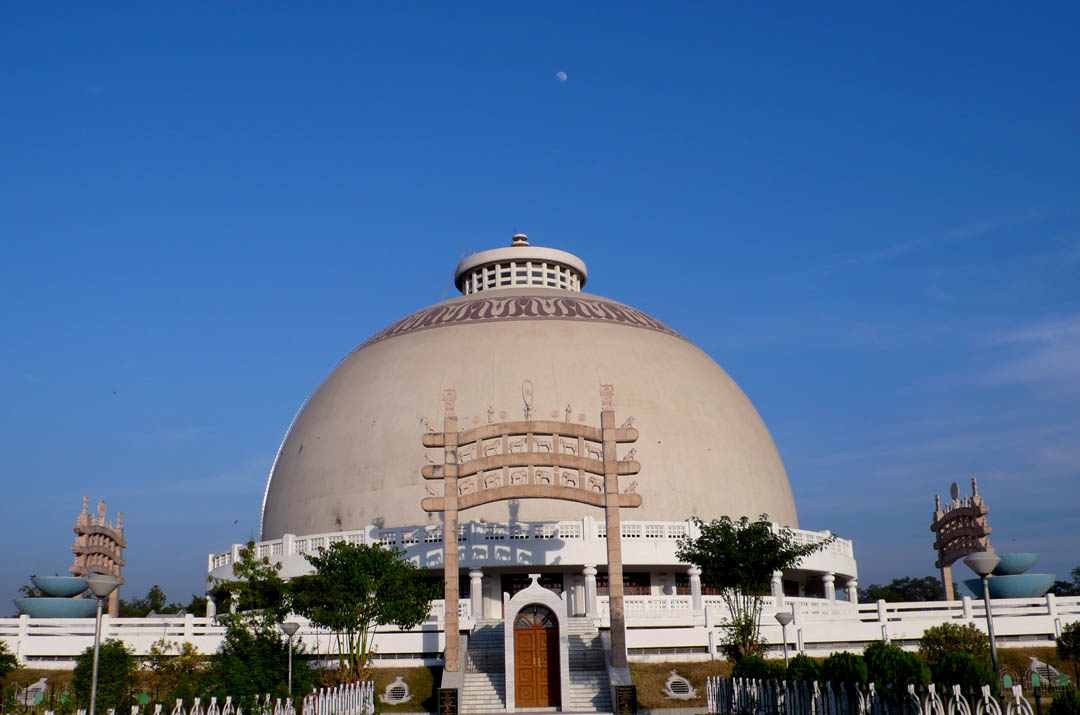
Deekshabhoomi Stupa in Nagpur, a replica of the Sanchi stupa, where B. R. Ambedkar became a Buddhist

In 1891, the Sri Lankan pioneering Buddhist activist Don David Hewavitarne (later known as Anagarika Dharmapala) visited India. His campaign, in cooperation with American Theosophists such as Henry Steel Olcott and Madame Blavatsky, led to the revival of Buddhist pilgrimage sites along with the formation of the Maha Bodhi Society and Maha Bodhi Journal. His efforts increased awareness and raised funds to recover Buddhist holy sites in British India, such as Bodh Gaya in India and those in Burma.

In the 1950s, B. R. Ambedkar pioneered the Dalit Buddhist movement in India for the Dalits (formerly referred to as "untouchables"). Dr. Ambedkar, on 14 October 1956 in Nagpur converted to Buddhism along with his 365,000 followers. Many other such mass-conversion ceremonies followed. Many converted employ the term "Navayana" (also known as "Ambedkarite Buddhism" or "Neo Buddhism") to designate the Dalit Buddhist movement, which started with Ambedkar's conversion. Now Marathi Buddhists are the largest Buddhist community in India.

In 1959, Tenzin Gyatso, the 14th Dalai Lama, escaped from Tibet to India along with numerous Tibetan refugees, and set up the government of Tibet in Exile in Dharamshala, India, which is often referred to as "Little Lhasa", after the Tibetan capital city. Tibetan exiles numbering several thousand have since settled in the town. Most of these exiles live in Upper Dharamsala, or McLeod Ganj, where they established monasteries, temples, and schools. The town has become one of the centres of Buddhism in the world.

In India, the most influential representative of Vipassana movement is the Vipassana Research Institute founded by S. N. Goenka (1924–2013) who promoted Buddhist Vipassanā Meditation in a modern and non-sectarian manner. This form of Buddhist meditation is mainly practised by elite and middle class Indians, and the Vipassana movement has also spread to many other countries in Europe, the Americas, and Asia. In November 2008, the construction of the Global Vipassana Pagoda was completed on the outskirts of Mumbai. Ten-day Vipassanā meditation courses are regularly conducted free of charge at the Dhamma Pattana Meditation Centre that is part of the Global Vipassana Pagoda complex.

The Buddhist population in the modern era nation of India grew at a decadal rate of 22.5% between 1901 and 1981, due to birth rates and conversions, or about the same rate as Hinduism, Jainism and Sikhism, but faster than Christianity (16.8%), and slower than Islam (30.7%).

According to a 2010 Pew estimate, the total Buddhist population had increased to about 10 million in the nations created from British India. Of these, about 7.2% lived in Bangladesh, 92.5% in India and 0.2% in Pakistan.

== See also ==
- Gautama Buddha
- Edicts of Ashoka
- History of Buddhism
- History of Buddhism in India
- Pre-sectarian Buddhism
- Early Buddhist Texts
- Vipassana Movement
- Maha Bodhi Society
- Bengal Buddhist Association
- Bhadant Anand Kausalyayan
- Bengali Buddhists
- Marathi Buddhists
- Buddhist Society of India
- Dalit Buddhist movement
- Lord Buddha TV
- Ambedkar
- Navayana
- Buddhist flag
- Bodh Gaya
- Buddhist pilgrimage sites in India
- Buddhism in Himachal Pradesh
- Buddhism in North Karnataka
- Buddhism in Kashmir
- Bodh Gaya bombings
- Central Tibetan Administration
- Tibetan diaspora
- Tibetan flag
- 14th Dalai Lama
- Annexation of Tibet by the People's Republic of China
- Index of Buddhism-related articles
- Religion in India
- Muslim conquests of the Indian subcontinent
- Conversion of non-Islamic places of worship into mosques
- Persecution of Buddhists

== Sources ==
- Anand, Ashok Kumar (1996), "Buddhism in India", Gyan Books, ISBN 978-81-212-0506-1
- Asher, Frederick M. (2020). Sarnath: A Critical History of the Place Where Buddhism Began. Los Angeles: Getty Research Institute. ISBN 978-1606066164.
- Auer, Blain; Strauch, Ingo (19 August 2019). Encountering Buddhism and Islam in Premodern Central and South Asia. Walter de Gruyter GmbH & Co KG. ISBN 978-3-11-062986-6.
- Berkwitz, Stephen C. (2012), South Asian Buddhism: A Survey, Routledge
- Bhagwan, Das (1988), Revival of Buddhism in India and Role of Dr. Baba Saheb B.R. Ambedkar, Dalit Today Prakashan, Lucknow -226016, India. ISBN 8187558016
- Bronkhorst, Johannes (2011). Buddhism in the Shadow of Brahmanism. BRILL.
- Collins, Randall (2000). The Sociology of Philosophies: A Global Theory of Intellectual Change. Harvard University Press. ISBN 0-674-00187-7.
- Dhammika, S. (1993). The Edicts of King Ashoka (PDF). Kandy, Sri Lanka: Buddhist Publication Society. ISBN 978-955-24-0104-6. Archived from the original (PDF) on 22 December 2013.
- Doniger, Wendy (2000). Merriam-Webster Encyclopedia of World Religions. Merriam-Webster. p. 1378. ISBN 978-0-87779-044-0.
- Elverskog, Johan (2011), Buddhism and Islam on the Silk Road, University of Pennsylvania Press, ISBN 978-0812205312
- Fogelin, Lars (2015). An Archaeological History of Indian Buddhism. Oxford University Press. ISBN 978-0-19-994823-9. ISBN 978-0-19-994822-2. (p. 219) (p. 223 Archived 5 December 2022 at the Wayback Machine)
- Harvey, Peter (2013). An Introduction to Buddhism: Teachings, History and Practices. Cambridge University Press. ISBN 978-0-521-85942-4.
- Inden, Ronald (1978). "Ritual, Authority, and Cycle Time in Hindu Kingship". In John F. Richards (ed.). Kingship and Authority in South Asia. New Delhi: South Asian Studies.
- Inden, Ronald B. (2000), Imagining India, C. Hurst & Co. Publishers
- Michaels, Axel (2004), Hinduism. Past and present, Princeton, New Jersey: Princeton University Press
- Queen, Christopher S.; King, Sallie B. (1996). Engaged Buddhism: Buddhist Liberation Movements in Asia. State University of New York Press. ISBN 978-0-7914-2844-3.
- Verardi, Giovanni (2011). Hardships and Downfall of Buddhism in India. Manohar Publishers & Distributors. ISBN 978-81-7304-928-6.
- White, David Gordon (2012), The Alchemical Body: Siddha Traditions in Medieval India, University of Chicago Press
- Willemen, Charles; Dessein, Bart; Cox, Collett (1998). Sarvastivada Buddhist Scholasticism. Brill Academic Publishers. ISBN 978-9-004-10231-6.
- Wink, André (2004), "Al-Hind, the Making of the Indo-Islamic World", BRILL, ISBN 90-04-10236-1
