= Samuel Beal =

British oriental scholar (1825–1889)

- Born: 27 November 1825; Devonport, Devon, United Kingdom
- Died: 20 August 1889 (aged 63); Greens Norton, United Kingdom
- Education: Trinity College, Cambridge

Samuel Beal (27 November 1825, in Devonport, Devon – 20 August 1889, in Greens Norton, Northamptonshire) was an Oriental scholar, and the first Englishman to translate directly from the Chinese the early records of Buddhism, thus illuminating Indian history.

== Life ==
Samuel Beal was born in Devonport, Devon, and went to Kingswood School and Devonport. He graduated from Trinity College, Cambridge in 1847. He was the son of a Wesleyan minister, reverend William Beal; and brother of William Beal and Philip Beal who survived a shipwreck in Kenn Reef.

From 1848 to 1850 he was headmaster of Bramham College, Yorkshire. He was ordained deacon in 1850, and priest in the following year. After serving as curate at Brooke in Norfolk and Sopley in Hampshire, he applied for the office of naval chaplain, and was appointed to H.M.S. Sybille (1847) during the China War of 1856–58. He was chaplain to the Marine Artillery and later to Pembroke and Devonport dockyards 1873–77.

In 1857, he printed for private circulation a pamphlet showing that the Tycoon of Yedo (i.e. Tokugawa shōgun of Edo), with whom foreigners had made treaties, was not the real Emperor of Japan.

In 1861 he married Martha Ann Paris, 1836–81.

In September 1872 he was appointed to examine the Buddhist Chinese books in the India Office Library, London. Of the Chinese language books held by the library, Beale found 72 Buddhist compilations across 112 volumes. His research illustrated key philosophical differences between Indian and Chinese Buddhism. An example was the Chinese version of the Indian Mahāparinibbāṇa Sutta. Beale's exegesis of the Chinese narrative revealed a key doctrinal divergence from the Indian version, and therefore between Northern and Southern Asian Buddhism, namely that Nirvana is not the cessation of Being but its perfection.

He retired from the navy in 1877, when he was appointed Professor of Chinese at University College, London. He was Rector of Falstone, Northumberland 1877–80; Rector of Wark, Northumberland 1880–88; and of Greens Norton, Northamptonshire, 1888–89. He was awarded DCL (Durham) in 1885 "in recognition of the value of his researches into Chinese Buddhism."

Beale's reputation was established by his series of works which traced the travels of the Chinese Buddhists in India from the fifth to the seventh centuries AD, and by his books on Buddhism, which have become classics.

=== The Buddhist Tripitaka ===
In 1874, Beale requested a Japanese copy of the Chinese Buddhist Tripitaka, the sacred books of Chinese and Japanese Buddhists, from Japanese ambassador Iwakura Tomomi. The copy was deposited at the India Office Library in 1875. This was the first time that the work became available in the West. Beal finished cataloging the books in June 1876.

== Works ==
- Faxian; Huisheng; Songyun (1869). Travels of Fah-Hian and Sung-Yun, Buddhist Pilgrims, from China to India (400 A.D. and 518 A.D.). Translated by Beal, Samuel. London: Trübner & Co.
  - Faxian (1869). Records of Buddhist Countries by Chi Fah Hian of the Sung Dynasty (Date 400 A.D.). Translated by Beal, Samuel. pp. 1–174.
  - Huisheng; Songyun; Yang Xuanzhi (1869). The Mission of Hwui Seng and Sung Yun to Obtain Buddhist Books in the West (518 A.D.). Translated by Beal, Samuel. pp. 175–208.
- The Catena of Buddhist Scriptures from the Chinese (1872)
- The Romantic Legend of Buddha (1876)
- Texts from the Buddhist Canon, Dhammapada (1878)
- Buddhism in China (1884)
- Xuanzang; et al. (1884). Si-Yu-Ki: Buddhist Records of the Western World by Hiuen Tsiang. Trübner's Oriental Series. Vol. I & II. London: Trübner & Co..
  - Faxian (1884). The Travels of Fa-hian or Fo-kwŏ-ki, Buddhist-Country-Records. Vol. I. Translated by Beal, Samuel. pp. xxiii–lxxxiii.
  - Songyun; Huisheng; Yang Xuanzhi (1884). The Mission of Sung-Yun and Hwei Sǎng to Obtain Buddhist Books in the West (518 A.D.). Vol. I. Translated by Beal, Samuel. pp. lxxxiv–cviii.
- The Life of Hiuen-Tsiang. Translated from the Chinese of Shaman Hwui Li (1911)
