= Faxian =

Buddhist Silk Road pilgrim (337–c. 422)

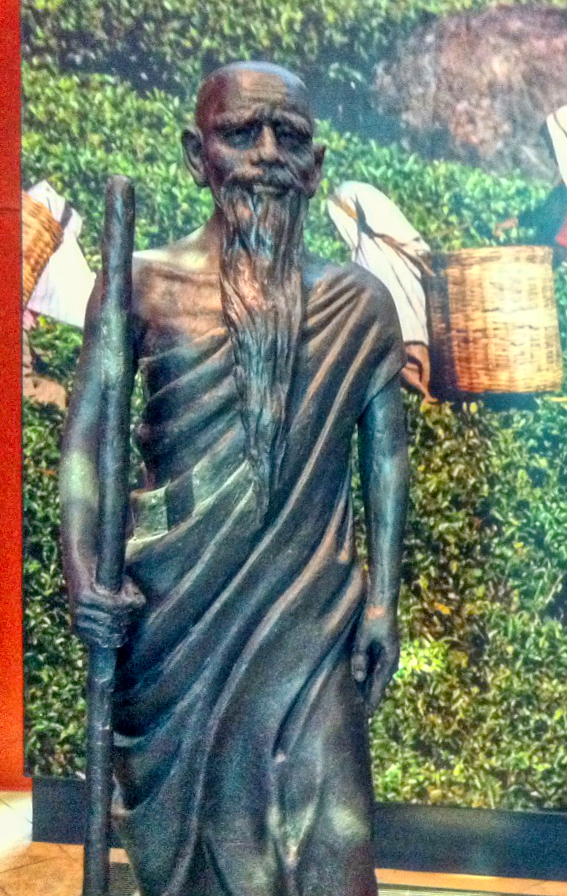
- Statue of Faxian, The Maritime Experiential Museum, Singapore

Personal life
- Born: Gong (surname); 337 CE Pingyang Wuyang (平陽武陽), in modern Linfen City, Shanxi
- Died: c. 422 CE (aged 85)
- Notable work: Foguoji (A Record of Buddhistic Kingdoms)
- Other name: Gong Sehi

Religious life
- Religion: Buddhism
- Monastic name: Fǎxiǎn

Faxian

Chinese name
- Traditional Chinese: 法顯
- Simplified Chinese: 法显
- Literal meaning: Splendor of the Dharma
Transcriptions
Standard Mandarin
- Hanyu Pinyin: Fǎxiǎn
- Wade–Giles: Fa-hsien
- IPA: [fà.ɕjɛ̀n]
Hakka
- Romanization: Fap^{5}-hien^{3}
Yue: Cantonese
- Yale Romanization: Fat^{3}-hin^{2}
- IPA: [fɐt̚˧.hin˧˥]
Southern Min
- Hokkien POJ: Huat-hién
Middle Chinese
- Middle Chinese: Pjop-xén

Vietnamese name
- Vietnamese: Pháp Hiển

Korean name
- Hangul: 법현

Japanese name
- Kanji: 法顕
- Kana: ほっけん
Transcriptions
- Romanization: Hokken

Hindi name
- Hindi: फा हियान

Faxian (337–c. 422 CE), formerly romanized as Fa-hien or Fa-hsien, was a Chinese Buddhist monk and translator who traveled on foot from the Later Qin state to classical India to acquire Buddhist scriptures. His birth surname was Gong. Starting his journey about age 60, he traveled west along the overland Silk Road, visiting Buddhist sites in Central, South, and Southeast Asia. The journey and return took from 399 to 412, with 10 years spent in India.

Faxian's account of his pilgrimage, the Foguoji or Record of the Buddhist Kingdoms, is a notable independent record of early Buddhism in India. He returned to China with a large number of Sanskrit texts, whose translations greatly influenced East Asian Buddhism and provide a terminus ante quem for many historical names, events, texts, and ideas therein.

== Biography ==
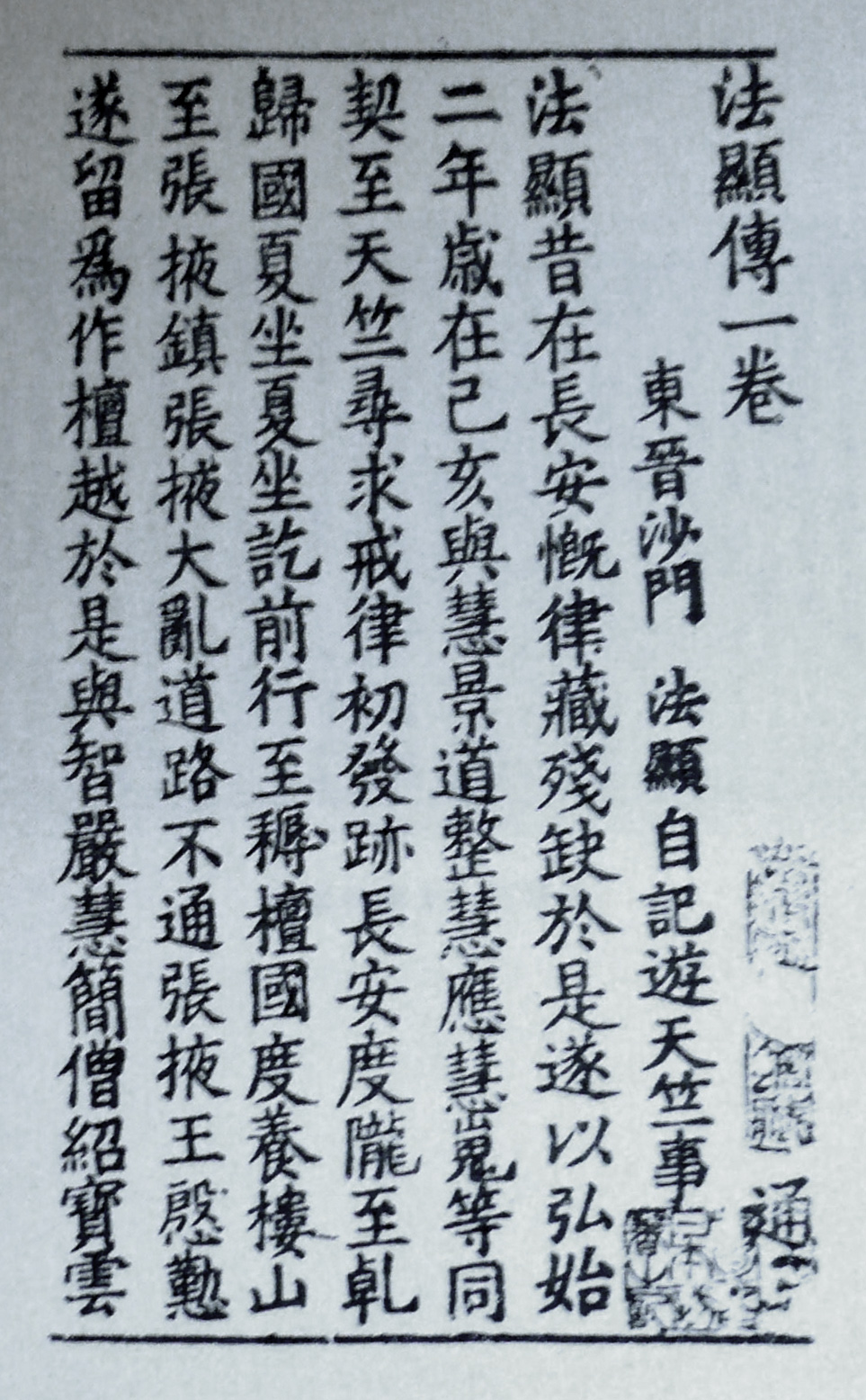
12th-century woodblock print, 1st page of the Travels of Faxian (Record of the Buddhist Countries). The first sentences read: "In Chang'an, Faxian was distressed that the Vinaya collections were incomplete. Therefore, in the 2nd year of Hongshi or the Ji-Hai year (36) of the sexagenary cycle [the Chinese year covering late 399 and early 400], he agreed with Huijing, Daozheng, Huiying, and Huiwei to go seek out more of the Vinaya in India."

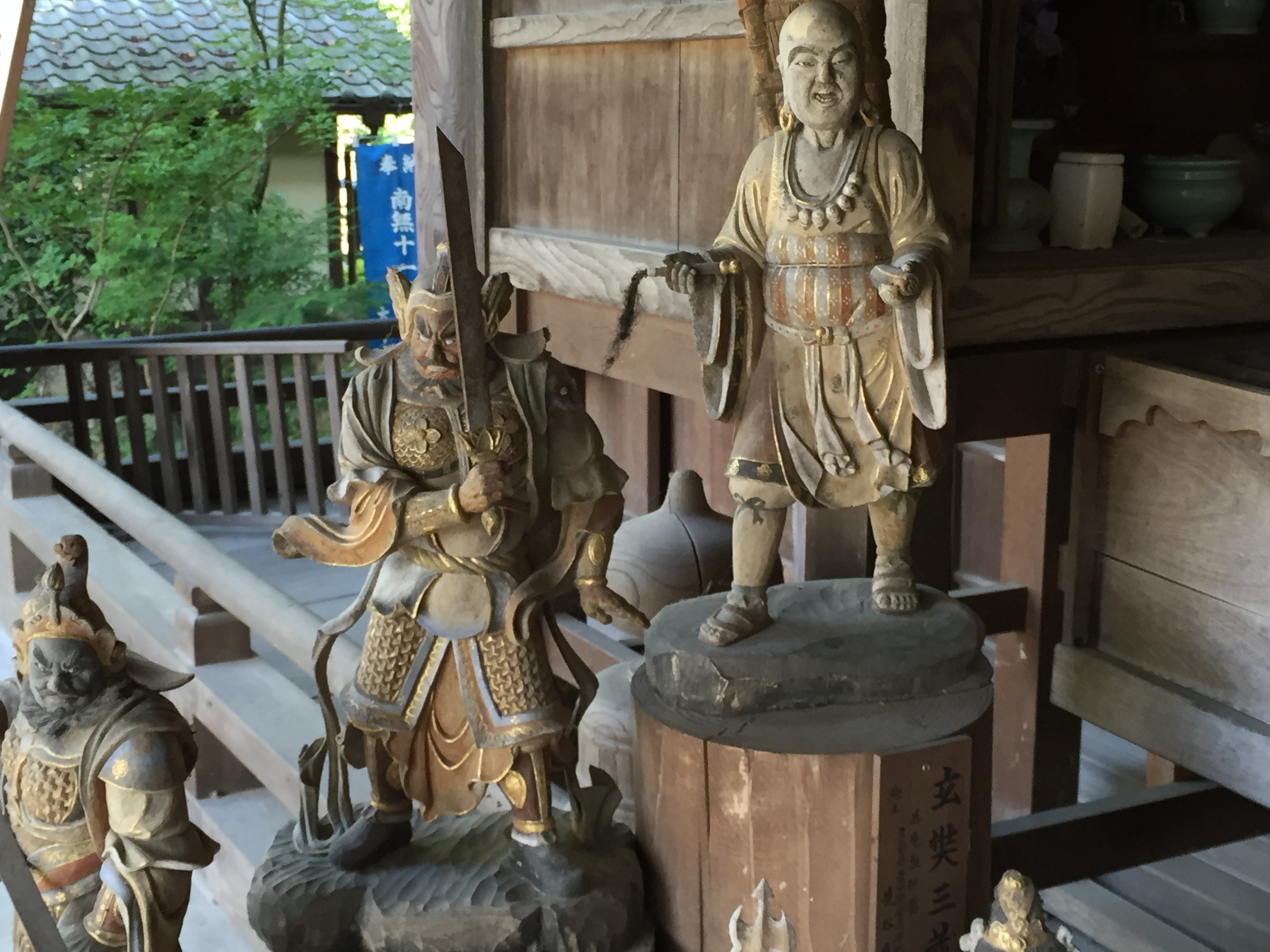
Faxian at Daishō-in Temple, Miyajima, Japan

Faxian was born in Shanxi in the 4th-century under the Later Zhao dynasty of the Sixteen Kingdoms period. He later adopted the name Faxian, which literally means "Splendor of Dharma". Three of his elder brothers died young. His father, fearing that the same fate would befall him, had him ordained as a novice monk at the age of three.

In 399 CE, about age 60, Faxian was among the earliest attested pilgrims to India. He set out from Chang'an, the capital of the Buddhist Later Qin dynasty, along with four others to locate sacred Buddhist texts and was later joined by five more pilgrims at Zhangye. He visited India in the early fifth century. He is said to have walked all the way from China across the icy desert and rugged mountain passes. He entered India from the northwest and reached Pataliputra. He took back with him a large number of Sanskrit Buddhist texts and images sacred to Buddhism. Upon his return to China, he is also credited with translating these Sanskrit texts into Chinese.

Faxian's visit to India occurred during the reign of Chandragupta II. He entered the Indian subcontinent through the northwest. His memoirs describe his 10 years stay in India. He visited the major sites associated with the Buddha, as well the renowned centres of education and Buddhist monasteries. He visited Kapilvastu (Lumbini), Bodh Gaya, Benares (Varanasi), Shravasti, and Kushinagar, all linked to events in Buddha's life. Faxian learned Sanskrit, and collected Indian literature from Pataliputra (Patna), Oddiyana, and Taxila in Gandhara. His memoirs mention the Hinayana and emerging Mahayana traditions, as well as the splintering and dissenting Theravada sub-traditions in 5th-century Indian Buddhism. Before he had begun his journey back to China, he had amassed a large number of Sanskrit texts of his times.

On Faxian's way back to China, after a two-year stay in Sri Lanka, a violent storm drove his ship onto an island, probably Java. After five months there, Faxian took another ship for southern China, but again it was blown off course and he ended up landing at Mount Lao in what is now Shandong in northern China, 30 kilometres (19 mi) east of the city of Qingdao. He spent the rest of his life translating and editing the scriptures he had collected. These were influential to the history of Chinese Buddhism that followed.

Faxian returned in 412 and settled in what is now Nanjing. He wrote a book on his travels around the year 414, filled with accounts of early Buddhism and the geography and history of numerous countries along the Silk Road as they were at the turn of the 5th century CE. He spent the next decade until his death translating the Buddhist sutras he had brought with him from India.

The following is the introduction to James Legge's 19th-century translation of Faxian's work. Legge's speculations, such as Faxian visiting India at the age of 25, have been discredited by later scholarship but his introduction provides some useful biographical information about Faxian:

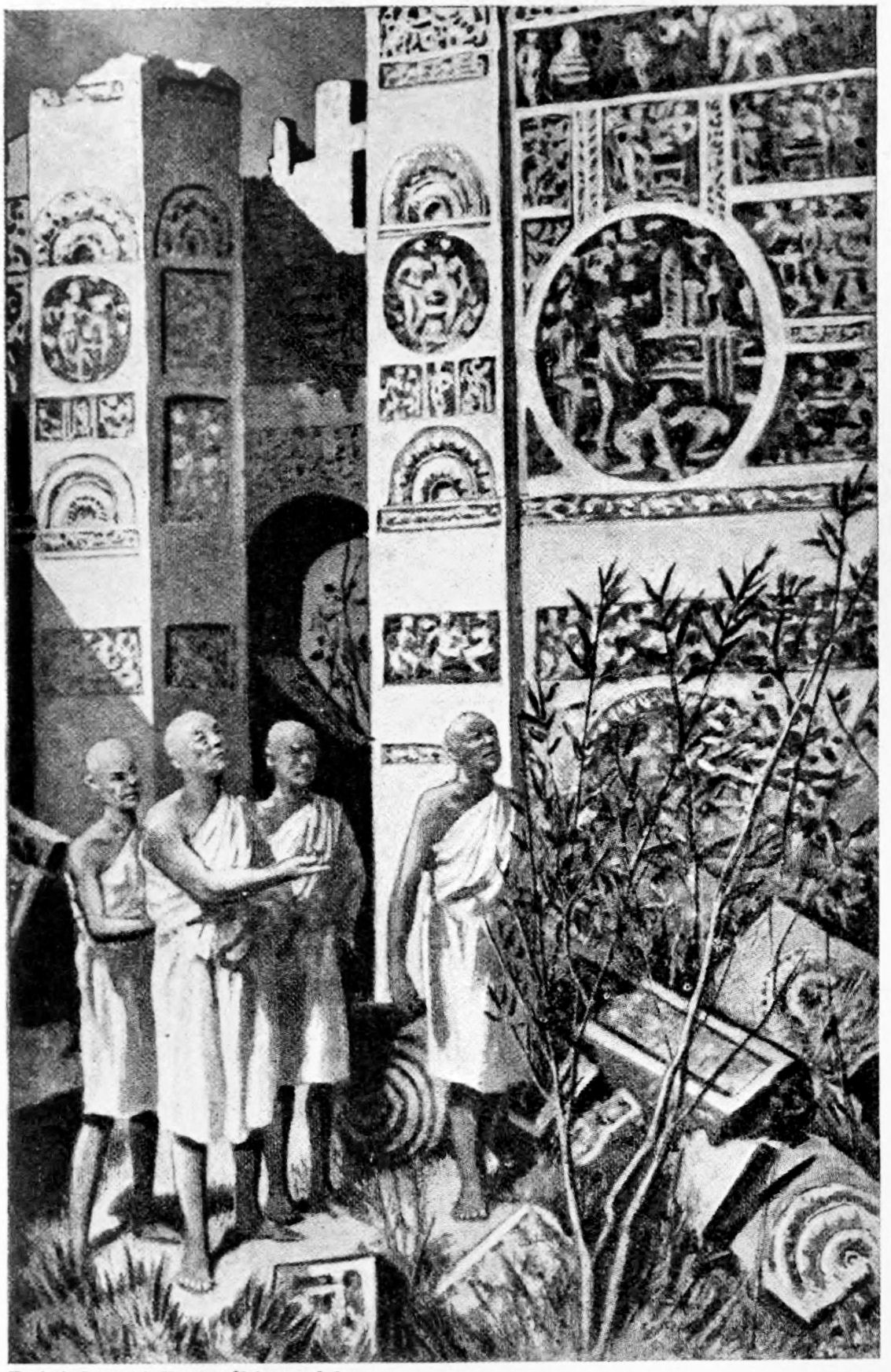
Faxian at the ruins of Ashoka palace

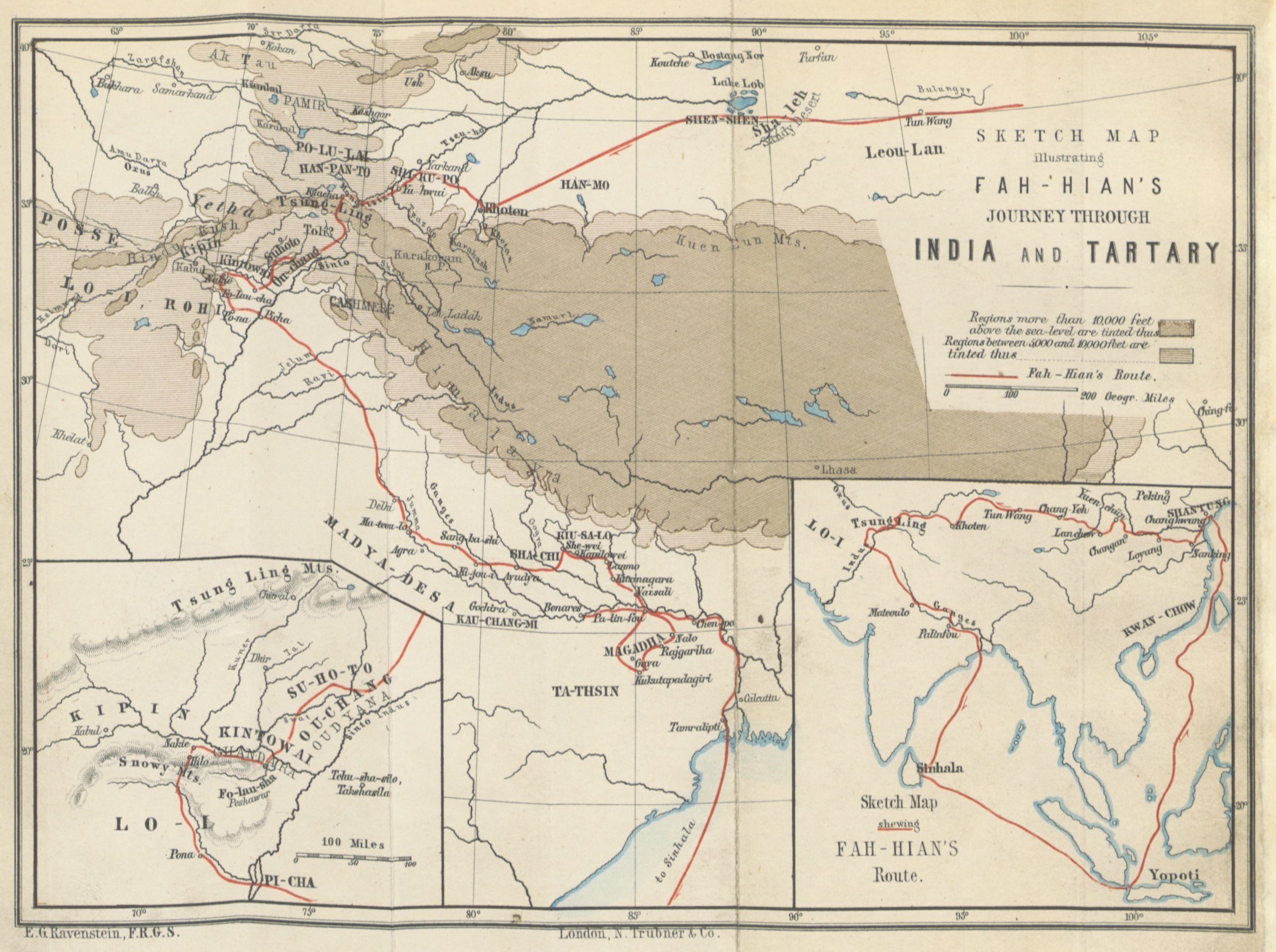
Faxian's route through India, from Beal's edition

Nothing of great importance is known about Fa-Hien in addition to what may be gathered from his own record of his travels. I have read the accounts of him in the Memoirs of Eminent Monks, compiled in 519 CE, and a later work, the Memoirs of Marvellous Monks, by the third emperor of the Ming dynasty (1403–1424 CE), which, however, are nearly all borrowed from the other; and all in them that has an appearance of verisimilitude can be brought within brief compass.

His surname, they tell us, was Kung, and he was a native of Wu-yang in P’ing-Yang, which is still the name of a large department in Shan-hsi. He had three brothers older than himself, but when they all died before shedding their first teeth, his father devoted him to the service of the Buddhist society and had him entered as a Sramanera, still keeping him at home in the family. The little fellow fell dangerously ill, and the father sent him to the monastery where he soon got well and refused to return to his parents.

When he was ten years old, his father died, and an uncle, considering the widowed solitariness and helplessness of the mother, urged him to renounce the monastic life and return to her, but the boy replied, "I did not quit the family in compliance with my father’s wishes, but because I wished to be far from the dust and vulgar ways of life. This is why I chose monkhood." The uncle approved of his words and gave over urging him. When his mother also died, it appeared how great had been the affection for her of his fine nature; but after her burial, he returned to the monastery.

On one occasion he was cutting rice with a score or two of his fellow-disciples when some hungry thieves came upon them to take away their grain by force. The other Sramaneras all fled, but our young hero stood his ground, and said to the thieves, "If you must have the grain, take what you please. But siries it was your former neglect of charity which brought you to your present state of destitution; and now, again, you wish to rob others. I am afraid that in the coming ages you will have still greater poverty and distress;—I am sorry for you beforehand." With these words he followed his companions into the monastery, while the thieves left the grain and went away, all the monks, of whom there were several hundred, doing homage to his conduct and courage.

When he had finished his novitiate and taken on him the obligations of the full Buddhist orders, his earnest courage, clear intelligence, and strict regulation of his demeanor were conspicuous; and soon after, he undertook his journey to India in search of complete copies of the Vinaya-pitaka. What follows this is merely an account of his travels in India and return to China by sea, condensed from his own narrative, with the addition of some marvelous incidents that happened to him, on his visit to the Vulture Peak near Rajagriha.

It is said in the end that after his return to China, he went to the capital (evidently Nanking), and there, along with the Indian Sramana Buddha-bhadra, executed translations of some of the works which he had obtained in India; and that before he had done all that he wished to do in this way, he removed to King-chow (in the present Hoo-pih), and died in the monastery of Sin, at the age of eighty-eight, to the great sorrow of all who knew him. It is added that there is another larger work giving an account of his travels in various countries.

Such is all the information given about our author, beyond what he himself has told us. Fa-Hien was his clerical name, and means "Illustrious in the Law", or "Illustrious master of the Law". The Shih which often precedes it is an abbreviation of the name of Buddha as Sakyamuni, "the Sakya, mighty in Love, dwelling in Seclusion and Silence," and may be taken as equivalent to Buddhist. It is sometimes said to have belonged to "the eastern Tsin dynasty" (317–419 CE), and sometimes to "the Sung", that is, the Sung dynasty of the House of Liu (420–478 CE). If he became a full monk at the age.... of twenty, and went to India when he was twenty-five, his long life may have been divided pretty equally between the two dynasties.

== Works ==
Faxian's major work is his account of his travels, known in English both by its Chinese name Foguoji or Foguo Ji (佛国记; 佛國記; Fóguójì) and by various translations, including A Record of the Buddhist Kingdoms, Record of the Buddhistic Kingdoms, Buddhist Country Records, etc. The book is also known as "Faxian's Travels" (法显行传; 法顯行傳; Fǎxiǎn Xíngzhuàn), "Faxian's Biography" (法显传; 法顯傳; Fǎxiǎnzhuàn), "Memoirs of the Eminent Monk Faxian" (高僧法显传; 高僧法顯傳; Gāosēng Fǎxiǎn Zhuàn), "A Buddhist Pilgrimage to India" (佛游天竺记; 佛游天竺記; Fóyóu Tiānzhú Jì), Faxian's "Report on Travel to India" (历游天竺记传; 歷游天竺記傳; Lìyóu Tiānzhú Jìzhuàn), and Faxian's work "On India" (天竺国记; 天竺國記; Tiānzhúguó Jì). Faxian's memoirs are an independent record of the society and culture of places he visited, particularly India. His translations of Sanskrit texts he took with him to China are an important means to date texts, named individuals, and Buddhist traditions. They provide a terminus ante quem for many historical names, manuscripts, events, and ideas mentioned.

Faxian noted that central Asian cities such as Khotan were Buddhist, with the clergy reading Indian Manuscripts in Indian languages. The local community revered the monks. He mentions a flourishing Buddhist community in Taxila (now in Pakistan) amid a generally non-Buddhist community. He describes elaborate rituals and public worship ceremonies, with support of the king, in the honour of the Buddha in India and Sri Lanka. He wrote about cities like Pataliputra, Mathura, and Kannauj in Madhya Desha. He also wrote that inhabitants of Madhyadesha eat and dress like Chinese people. He declared Pataliputra to be a prosperous city. He left India about 409 from Tamralipti, a port he states to be on its eastern coast. However, some of his Chinese companion pilgrims who came with him on the journey decided to stay in India.

Impressions of India

The cities and towns of this country [Magadha] are the greatest of all in the Middle Kingdom [Mathura through Deccan]. The inhabitants are rich and prosperous, and vie with one another in the practice of benevolence and righteousness. Every year on the eighth day of the second month they celebrate a procession of images. They make a four-wheeled car, and on it erect a structure of four storeys by means of bamboos tied together. This is supported by a king-post, with poles and lances slanting from it, and is rather more than twenty cubits high, having the shape of a tope. White and silk-like cloth of hair is wrapped all round it, which is then painted in various colours. They make figures of devas, with gold, silver, and lapis lazuli grandly blended and having silken streamers and canopies hung out over them. On the four sides are niches, with a Buddha seated in each, and a Bodhisattva standing in attendance on him. There may be twenty cars, all grand and imposing, but each one different from the others. On the day mentioned, the monks and laity within the borders all come together; they have singers and skillful musicians; they pay their devotion with flowers and incense. The Brahmans come and invite the Buddhas to enter the city. These do so in order, and remain two nights in it. All through the night they keep lamps burning, have skillful music, and present offerings. This is the practice in all the other kingdoms as well. The Heads of the Vaisya families in them establish in the cities houses for dispensing charity and medicines. All the poor and destitute in the country, orphans, widowers, and childless men, maimed people and cripples, and all who are diseased, go to those houses, and are provided with every kind of help, and doctors examine their diseases. They get the food and medicines which their cases require, and are made to feel at ease; and when they are better, they go away of themselves.

— Faxian, c. 415 CE

Struggles at sea during the return journey through Java

At this time the sky continued very dark and gloomy, and the sailing-masters looked at one another and made mistakes. More than seventy days passed (from their leaving Java), and the provisions and water were nearly exhausted. They used the salt-water of the sea for cooking, and carefully divided the (fresh) water, each man getting two pints. Soon the whole was nearly gone, and the merchants took counsel and said, "At the ordinary rate of sailing we ought to have reached Kwang-chow, and now the time is passed by many days;—must we not have held a wrong course?" Immediately they directed the ship to the north-west, looking out for land; and after sailing day and night for twelve days, they reached the shore on the south of mount Lao, on the borders of the prefecture of Ch’ang-kwang, and immediately got good water and vegetables. They had passed through many perils and hardships, and had been in a state of anxious apprehension for many days together; and now suddenly arriving at this shore, and seeing those (well-known) vegetables, the lei and kwoh, they knew indeed that it was the land of Han.

— Faxian, c. 415 CE.

Rémusat's translation of the work caused a stir in European scholarship, deeply perplexing many with its inability to handle the many Sanskrit words Faxian transcribed into Middle Chinese characters.

=== Translations ===
==== French ====
- Abel-Rémusat, Jean-Pierre; et al., eds. (1836), 佛國記 Foé Koué Ki, ou, Relations des Royaumes Bouddhiques: Voyage dans la Tartarie, dans l'Afghanistan, et dans l'Inde Exécuté à la Fin du IVe Siècle par Chy̆ Fă Hian [The Foguoji (佛國記), or, Relations of the Buddhist Kingdoms: The Voyage through Tartary, Afghanistan, and India Carried Out at the End of the 4th Century by Shi Faxian] (in French), Paris: Royal Printing Office.

==== English ====
- Laidlay, John Watson; et al., eds. (1848), The Pilgrimage of Fa Hian from the French Edition of the Foe Koue Ki of MM. Remusat, Klaproth, and Landresse with Additional Notes and Illustrations, Calcutta: Baptist Mission Press.
- Beal, Samuel, ed. (1869), "Records of Buddhist Countries by Chi Fah Hian of the Sung Dynasty", Travels of Fah-Hian and Sung-Yun, Buddhist Pilgrims, from China to India (400 A.D. and 518 A.D.), London: Trübner & Co., pp. 1–174.
- Giles, Herbert Allen, ed. (1877), 佛國記 Record of the Buddhistic Kingdoms, Shanghai: Kelly & Walsh; revised and republished as The Travels of Fa-hsien (399–414 A.D.), or, Record of the Buddhistic Kingdoms, Cambridge: Cambridge University Press, 1923.
- Beal, Samuel, ed. (1884), "Travels of Fa-hian or Fo-kwŏ-ki, Buddhist-Country-Records", Si-Yu-Ki: Buddhist Records of the Western World by Hiuen Tsiang, Trübner's Oriental Series, vol. I, London: Trübner & Co., pp. xxiii–lxxiii.
- Legge, James, ed. (1886), A Record of Buddhistic Kingdoms, Being an Account by the Chinese Monk Fâ-hien of His Travels in India and Ceylon (A.D. 399–414) in Search of the Buddhist Books of Discipline, Oxford: Clarendon Press.

== See also ==
- Fa Hien Cave
- Chinese Buddhism
- Silk Road transmission of Buddhism
- Xuanzang, his Records of the Western Regions, & the fictionalized Journey to the West
- Yijing & his Record of Buddhist Practices Sent Home from the Southern Sea
- Songyun & Huisheng, whose travels are preserved in other sources
- Hyecho & his Wang Ocheonchukguk Jeon
