= Huisheng =

Huisheng is the atonal pinyin romanization of various Chinese names.

It may refer to:

- Huisheng (monk) (6th century), famed for his pilgrimage to India from the Northern Wei
- Princess Huisheng (1938–1957), eldest daughter of Pujie, younger brother of Puyi, the last emperor of China
