= William Beal (writer) =

English religious writer

William Beal (9 September 1815, Sheffield – 20 April 1870, Aigle, Switzerland) was an English religious writer.

== Life ==
The Reverend Dr. William Beal, FSA, was born 9 September 1815 in Sheffield. He was the son of the Reverend William Beal, a Wesleyan minister, and brother of Samuel Beal and Philip Beal who survived a shipwreck on Kenn Reef. He was educated at Kingswood School, King's College London; St John's College, Cambridge and Trinity College, Cambridge, where he graduated B.A. in 1841. In the same year he was ordained deacon. Beal was headmaster of Tavistock Grammar School from 1837 to 1847. He was curate of Stamford Spiney in Devon between 1841 and 1842; and of Bray, Dublin, from 1843 to 1847. He was vicar of Brooke near Norwich from 1847 to 1870. The degree of LL.D. was conferred on him by the University of Aberdeen. He is best known as the promoter of harvest homes for country districts in 1854. At Norwich he was vice-president of the People's College, Diocesan Inspector of Schools from 1855 to 1870 and corresponding member of the Working Men's Congregational Union. He died in 1870, while he was the editor of the West of England Magazine.

He married Mary Ann Smith, sister of William Henry Smith of the stationery company W.H.Smith, who was also a cabinet minister in Disraeli's Government in 1877.

== Works ==
- An Analysis of Palmer's Origines Liturgicæ, 1850
- The Nineveh Monuments and the Old Testament
- A Letter to the Earl of Albemarle on Harvest Homes.
- A First Book of Chronology, 1846
- (ed., with preface) 'Certain godly Prayers originally appended to the Book of Common Prayer
