= Yang Xuanzhi =

Chinese official

- Traditional Chinese: 楊衒之 陽衒之 羊衒之
- Simplified Chinese: 杨炫之 阳衒之 羊炫之
Transcriptions
Standard Mandarin
- Hanyu Pinyin: Yáng Xuànzhī
- Wade–Giles: Yang Hsüan-chih

Yang Xuanzhi (fl. 6th century AD) was a Chinese official and translator of Mahayana Buddhist texts into the Chinese language during the Tuoba Northern Wei Dynasty in China's Northern and Southern dynastic period. He is primarily remembered as the author of a history of the Buddhist temples and monasteries of Luoyang in Henan Province, at the time the capital of the Wei Empire.

== Works ==
Yang wrote The History of the Temples of Luoyang or Record of the Monasteries of Luoyang (t 《洛陽伽藍記》, s 《洛阳伽蓝记》, Luòyáng Qiélánjì or Qiélán Jì) in 547. This text relates the introduction of Buddhism to China around the year 70:

The establishment of the Baima Temple (Temple of the White Horse) by Emperor Ming (AD 58–75) of the Han marked the introduction of Buddhism into China. The temple was located on the south side of the Imperial Drive, three leagues (li) outside the Xiyang Gate. The Emperor dreamt of the golden man sixteen Chinese feet tall, with the aureole of sun and moon radiating from his head and his neck. A "golden god", he was known as Buddha. The emperor dispatched envoys to the Western Regions in search of the god, and, as a result, acquired Buddhist scriptures and images. At the time, because the scriptures were carried into China on the backs of white horses, White Horse was adopted as the name of the temple.

Yang's book also contains the first known account of the Buddhist monk Bodhidharma, founder of Zen, whom he met in Luoyang around 520. He describes him as a man of Central Asian origin, who claims to be 150 years old and to have traveled extensively throughout Buddhist lands. He also wrote that Bodhidharma expressed praise for the beauty of the Buddhist temples in Luoyang, and that he chanted the name of the Buddha frequently:

Seeing the golden disks at the top of the monastery's stupa reflecting in the sun, the rays of light illuminating the surface of the clouds, the jewel-bells on the stupa blowing in the wind, the echoes reverberating beyond the heavens, Bodhidharma sang its praises. He exclaimed: "Truly this is the work of spirits." He said: "I am 150 years old, and I have passed through numerous countries. There is virtually no country I have not visited. But even in India there is nothing comparable to the pure beauty of this monastery. Even the distant Buddha realms lack this." He chanted homage and placed his palms together in salutation for days on end.
...
Hsiu-Fan Monastery had a statue of a fierce thunderbolt bearer guarding the gate. Pigeons and doves would neither fly through the gate nor roost upon it. Bodhidharma said: "That catches its true character!"

— Yang Xuanzhi, The Monasteries of Luoyang, chapter 1

The Record of the Monasteries of Luoyang also preserves an account of the travels of the Buddhist pilgrims Songyun and Huisheng to India and back, whose own works are now lost.

=== Editions ===
- Beal, Samuel, ed. (1869), "The Mission of Hwui Seng and Sung Yun to Obtain Buddhist Books in the West (518 A.D.), Translated from the 5th Section of the History of the Temples of Lo-Yang (Honan Fu)", Travels of Fah-Hian and Sung-Yun, Buddhist Pilgrims, from China to India (400 A.D. and 518 A.D.), London: Trübner & Co., pp. 175–208.
- Beal, Samuel, ed. (1884), "The Mission of Sung-Yun and Hwei Sǎng to Obtain Buddhist Books in the West (518 A.D.), Translated from the 5th Section of the History of the Temples of Lo-Yang (Honan Fu)", Si-Yu-Ki: Buddhist Records of the Western World by Hiuen Tsiang, Trübner's Oriental Series, vol. I, London: Trübner & Co., pp. lxxxiv–cviii.
- Wang Yi-t'ung [Yitong, 王伊同], ed. (1983), A Record of Buddhist Monasteries in Lo-Yang, Princeton: Princeton University Press.
- "《洛陽伽藍記》" [Record of the Sangharamas of Luoyang], Taishō Tripiṭaka (in Chinese), vol. 51, No. 2092, Beijing: Taisho Publishing Co., 1988, archived from the original on 29 February 2024, also hosted by the Nan Tien Institute.
