= A record of Buddhist monasteries in Luoyang =

Author's Preface by Yang Xuanzhi

A Record of Buddhist Monasteries in Luoyang (Traditional Chinese: 洛陽伽藍記, Simplified Chinese: 洛阳伽蓝记, Pinyin: Luò Yáng Qié Lán Jì) is a work from the 6th century, recording the numerous Buddhist temples and social life of Luoyang, the capital of the Northern Wei empire in the early 6th century, written by Yang Xuanzhi (楊衒之). The author returned to Luoyang in the 5th year of the Wuding (武定) era of Emperor Wei Xiaojing (547), and seeing it destroyed and reduced to ruins, wrote this book to remember its lost splendor.

The book consists of five volumes, dividing the areas of Luoyang city into the Inner City, Eastern City, Southern City, Western City, and Northern City. Each chapter uses temples as a thread, while also recording other matters.

== Name ==
"Qielan" (伽蓝) is an abbreviated transliteration of the Sanskrit word "Sangharama", meaning "monastery", which later became a general term for Buddhist temples.

== Famous Architecture ==
The book records the Pagoda of Yongning Temple, probably the tallest buildings in ancient China, though its height is exaggerated in this text.
