= Yijing (monk) =

Chinese Buddhist monk (635–713 CE)

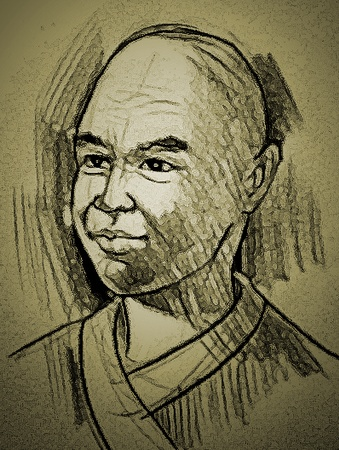
- Artist impression of Yijing
- Born: 635 CE; Fanyang (Yanjing), Tang Empire
- Died: 713 CE; Chang'an (now Xi'an)
- Occupations: Buddhist monk, traveler

Personal life
- Education: Nalanda

Religious life
- Religion: Buddhism

Senior posting
- Teacher: Shi Huen

Yijing
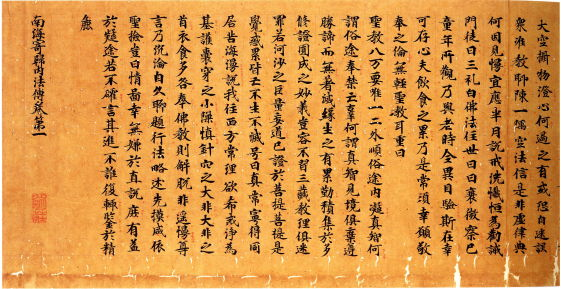
- Excerpt of a scroll from Yijing's Buddhist Monastic Traditions of Southern Asia. Tenri, Nara, Japan
- Traditional Chinese: 義淨
- Simplified Chinese: 义净
Transcriptions
Standard Mandarin
- Hanyu Pinyin: Yìjìng
- Wade–Giles: I-ching; I Ching

Buddhist title
- Traditional Chinese: 三藏法師義淨
- Simplified Chinese: 三藏法师义净
- Literal meaning: Tripitaka Dharma-Master Yijing
Transcriptions
Standard Mandarin
- Hanyu Pinyin: Sānzàng Fǎshī Yìjìng
- Wade–Giles: San-tsang Fa-shih I-ching

Zhang Wenming
- Traditional Chinese: 張文明
- Simplified Chinese: 张文明
Transcriptions
Standard Mandarin
- Hanyu Pinyin: Zhāng Wénmíng
- Wade–Giles: Chang Wên-ming

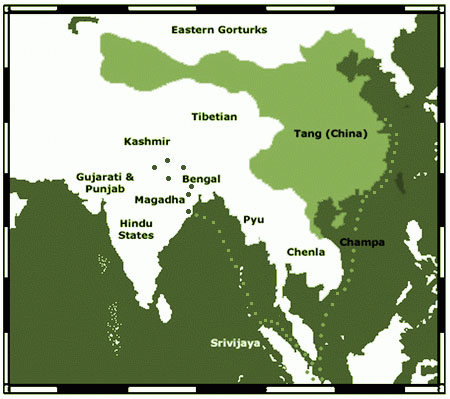
Yijing's travel map of the 7th century.

Yijing (635–713 CE), formerly romanized as I-ching or I-tsing, born Zhang Wenming, was a Tang-era Chinese Buddhist monk and renowned travel writer. His account of his travels are an important source for the history of the medieval kingdoms along the sea route between China and India, especially Srivijaya in Indonesia. He also gave accounts of the Gupta Period in ancient India. A student of the Buddhist university at Nālandā (now in Bihar, India), he was also responsible for the translation of many Buddhist texts from Sanskrit and Pali into Chinese.

== Biography ==
Yijing was born Zhang Wenming in 635 CE and was ordained as a monk at the age of 20. Growing up, he was an admirer of both Faxian and Xuanzang who both achieved fame travelling in India. In 671 he began his journey to India travelling along the "Maritime Silk Road" which took him through much of South East Asia. When he finally reached India he visited the main sites associated with the life of the Buddha and then came to the famed monastery of Nalanda where he remained for the next ten years.

Yijing also wrote in his travelogue that an emperor by the name of "Che-li-ki-to" had built a Buddhist monastery in Bengal 500 years ago. Che-li-ki-to is identified as Sri Gupta, however Yijing's account is largely wrong, as it goes against the dates proposed for Sri Gupta. However, he should not be taken literally as he was just "stating the tradition told to him by older men". Many modern scholars reject his account of the Buddhist monastery as well.

After completing his studies in Nalanda, he began his journey back to China by travelling through South East Asia, arriving in the Srivijaya realm (modern Sumatra). He remained here for some time to continue his studies and described the monks of this region as being Theravadas. It was during his time here that he began to compose his travelogue which was the A Nanhai Jigui Neifa Zhuan (Record of Buddhist Practices Sent Home from the Southern Sea). He also engaged in translation work while in Srivijaya. In 689, after running out of supplies, he briefly returned to China to retrieve paper and ink before returning to Srivijaya.

In 695, he completed all translation works and finally returned to China at Luoyang and received a grand welcome back by Empress Wu Zetian. His total journey took 25 years. He brought back some 400 Buddhist texts translated into Chinese.

The A Record of Buddhist Practices Sent Home from the Southern Sea and Buddhist Monk's Pilgrimage of the Tang Dynasty are two of Yijing's best travel diaries, describing his adventurous journey to Srivijaya and India, reporting on the society of India, the lifestyles of various local peoples, and more.

== Distribution of Buddhist traditions ==
In the great majority of areas in India, Yijing writes that there were followers of both "vehicles" (Skt. Yana), with some Buddhists practicing according to the Hinayana and others practicing according to the Mahayana. He describes northern India and most of the islands of the South Seas (i.e. Sumatra, Java, etc.) as principally "Hīnayāna." In contrast, the Buddhists in China and Malayu are described as principally following the Mahāyāna.

Yijing wrote about relationship between the various "vehicles" and the early Buddhist schools in India. He wrote, "There exist in the West numerous subdivisions of the schools which have different origins, but there are only four principal schools of continuous tradition." These schools are namely the Mahāsāṃghika, Sthavira, Mulasarvastivada, and Saṃmitīya nikāyas. Explaining their doctrinal affiliations, he then writes, "Which of the four schools should be grouped with the Mahāyāna or with the Hīnayāna is not determined." That is to say, there was no simple correspondence between a monastic sect and whether its members learned "Hīnayāna" or "Mahāyāna" teachings.

== Buddhism in Srivijaya ==
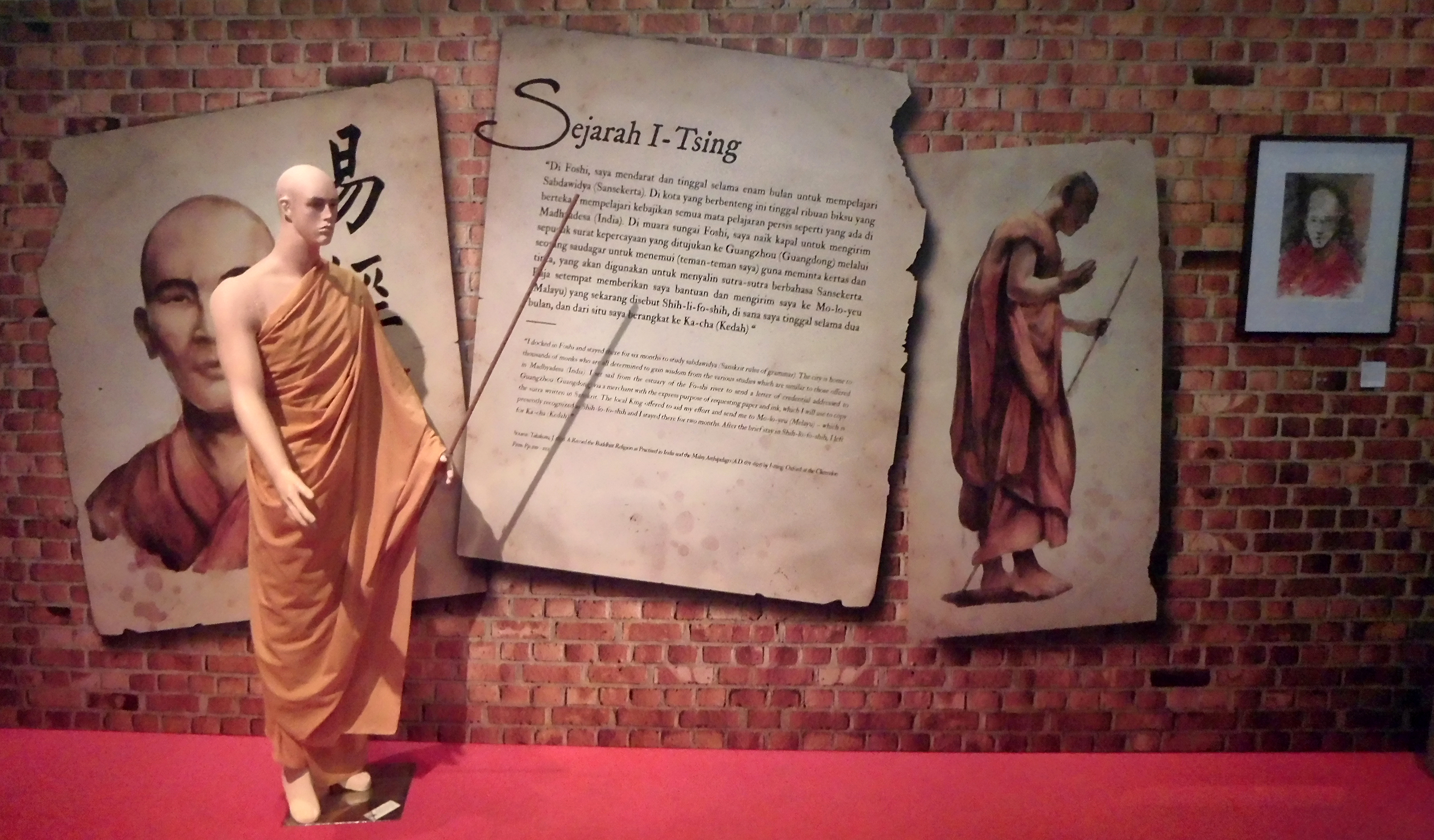
A depiction of Yijing displayed at the Kedatuan Sriwijaya temporary exhibition, National Museum of Indonesia (November 2017)

Yijing praised the high level of Buddhist scholarship in Srivijaya (modern-day Sumatra) and advised Chinese monks to study there prior to making the journey to Nalanda in India.

In the fortified city of Bhoga, Buddhist priests number more than 1,000, whose minds are bent on learning and good practice. They investigate and study all the subjects that exist just as in India; the rules and ceremonies are not at all different. If a Chinese priest wishes to go to the West in order to hear and read the original scriptures, he had better stay here one or two years and practice the proper rules....

Yijing's visits to Srivijaya gave him the opportunity to meet with others who had come from other neighboring islands. According to him, the Javanese kingdom of Ho-ling (Kalingga Kingdom) was due east of the city of Bhoga at a distance that could be spanned by a four or five days' journey by sea. He also wrote that Buddhism was flourishing throughout the islands of Southeast Asia. "Many of the kings and chieftains in the islands of the Southern Sea admire and believe in Buddhism, and their hearts are set on accumulating good actions."

== Translations into Chinese ==
Yijing translated more than 60 texts into Chinese, including:

- Mūlasarvāstivāda Vinaya (一切有部毗奈耶)
- Golden Light Sutra (金光明最勝王經) in 703
- Diamond Sutra (能斷金剛般若波羅蜜多經, T. 239) in 703
- Sūtra of the Original Vows of the Medicine Buddha of Lapis Lazuli Radiance and the Seven Past Buddhas (藥師琉璃光七佛本願功德經, T. 451), in 707
- Avadanas (譬喻經) in 710

== See also ==
- Faxian
- Chinese Buddhism
- A Record of Buddhist Practices Sent Home from the Southern Sea
- Song Yun
- Xuanzang
- Vikramashila
- Hyecho
- Great Tang Records on the Western Regions
- Wang ocheonchukguk jeon
