= Song Yun =

Chinese Buddhist monk and traveller

Song Yun or Songyun

Personal life
- Born: late 5th or early 6th cent. Dunhuang
- Died: 6th cent.

Religious life
- Religion: Buddhism
- School: Mahayana
- Monastic name: Song Yun

Senior posting
- Based in: Northern Wei Dynasty
- Period in office: fl. 510s & 520s

Song Yun
- Traditional Chinese: 宋雲
- Simplified Chinese: 宋云
Transcriptions
Standard Mandarin
- Hanyu Pinyin: Sòng Yún; Sòngyún
- Wade–Giles: Sung Yün; Sung-yün

Song Yun or Songyun (fl. 510s & 520s) was a Chinese Buddhist monk who travelled to medieval India from the Tuoba Northern Wei kingdom during China's Northern and Southern dynastic period at the behest of the Empress Hu. He and his companions Huisheng, Fali, and Zheng or Wang Fouze left the Wei capital Luoyang on foot in 518 and returned in the winter of 522 with 170 Buddhist scriptures. Song and Hui's accounts of their journey are now lost but much of their information was preserved in other texts.

== Life ==
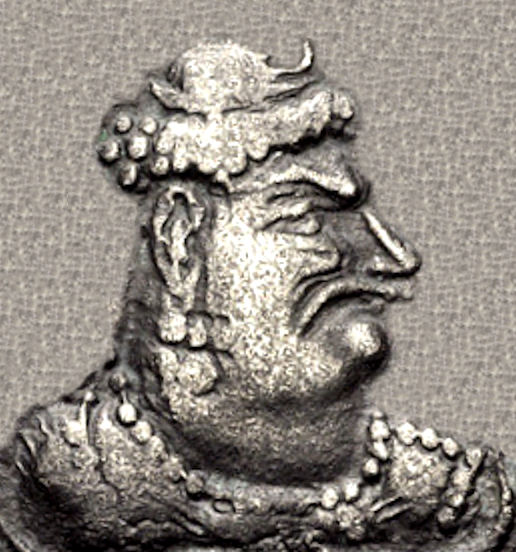
Song Yun met with Mihirakula, the King of the Alchon Huns.

Knowledge of Song Yun's bibliography is known primarily from sources derived from the accounts of the journey written by Song and his companion Huisheng or analysis of those sources. He was originally from Dunhuang. Surviving accounts of his journey to India vary in various details. According to the reconstruction of the trip by Édouard Chavannes,

Huisheng [and the others] were sent in the 11th day of the second month of the second Zhengui year (518); he and his companions arrived in Karghalik on the 29th day of the 7th month of the 2nd Zhengui year (519); in the second ten days of the ninth month, they met the king of the Hephthalites; at the beginning of the 11th month, they arrived in Bosi or Boji (southwest of Wakhan); in the second ten days of this same month, they entered Chitral and at the beginning of the 12th month they entered Udyana. Then, during the second ten days of the fourth month of the first Chengkuang year (520), they arrived in Gandhara. They stayed two years in Udyana and Gandhara until returning at the beginning of the third Chengkuang year (522), (and not the second year as one reads in the Account)." According to legend, they returned through the Congling (or "Onion") Mountains where Song Yun met the celebrated Damo or Bodhidharma who had died recently at Luoyang.

Song Yun took the Qinghai Route via Xining, past Qinghai Lake and through the Qaidam depression, probably joining the main Southern Silk Route near Shanshan/Loulan. The route at the time was under the control of the Tuyuhun (Tibetan: 'Azha) people.

They seem to have travelled to India along the difficult southern branch of the Silk Routes from Dunhuang to Yutian (Khotan) along the edge of the Taklamakan Desert, to the north of the Congling Mountains, and then crossed the mountains as Faxian had done before them. After passing through Wakhan, they met with the king of the Hephthalites, who had taken over the lands previously controlled by the Yuezhi and had recently conquered Gandhara. He was apparently on tour at the time near the entrance to the Wakhan Corridor and not at his capital city Badiyan (Bâdhaghìs) which was near modern Herat in western Afghanistan. The king, who had control over more than forty kingdoms, prostrated twice and received an Imperial edict from the Northern Wei Dynasty on his knees.

Song Yun and his companions then travelled through Chitral and met the kings of the Swat Valley or Udyana.

== Works ==
Song and one of his companions, Huisheng, both wrote accounts of their journey, but they have since disappeared. His work is known as the Itinerary, Travels, or Travel Record of Songyun (t 《宋雲行記》, s 《宋云行记》, Sòngyún Xíngjì). Fortunately, much valuable information about their journey has been preserved in Luoyang qielan ji, by Yang Xuanzhi, and in other texts. There are some minor discrepancies among the surviving sources as to the exact dates of the journey and the names of the people who made the trip together.

== See also ==
- Buddhism in China
- Silk Road transmission of Buddhism
- Xuanzang & his Records of the Western Regions
- Yijing & his Record of Buddhist Practices Sent Home from the Southern Sea
- Faxian & the Fa Hien Cave
- Hyecho & his Wang Ocheonchukguk Jeon (往五天竺國傳)
