= Brooke, Norfolk =

Village in Norfolk, England

Coordinates: 52°32′31″N 1°22′12″E

Brooke
- Village and civil parish
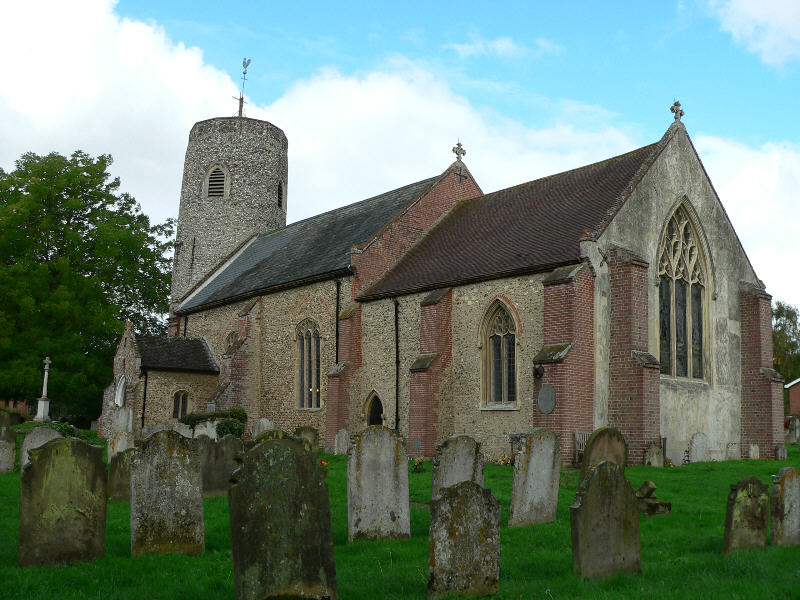
- Brooke St Peter

- Location within Norfolk
- Area: 11.91 km^{2} (4.60 sq mi)
- Population: 1,390 (2021)
  - Density: 117/km^{2} (300/sq mi)
- OS grid reference: TG293001
- Civil parish: Brooke
- District: South Norfolk
- Shire county: Norfolk
- Region: East
- Country: England
- Sovereign state: United Kingdom
- Post town: NORWICH
- Postcode district: NR15
- Dialling code: 01508
- Police: Norfolk
- Fire: Norfolk
- Ambulance: East of England
- UK Parliament: South Norfolk

Brooke is a village and civil parish in the English county of Norfolk. It is 5 miles (8.0 km) west of Loddon and 6.5 miles (10.5 km) south-east of Norwich. At the 2021 census, the parish had a population of 1,390.

In the Domesday Book, Brooke is recorded as a settlement of 41 households in the hundred of Henstead. In 1086, the village was part of the estates of Bury St Edmunds Abbey.

The village has a school, Brooke Church of England Primary School, which is located in a 17th century schoolhouse, the King's Head and White Lion public houses, a petrol station, and a village hall. Brooke Cricket Club operates two senior men's teams as well as several youth teams.

== Church ==
Brooke's parish church is dedicated to Saint Peter and dates to the 12th century; it is one of Norfolk's 124 remaining round-tower churches. The church was restored in the 15th and 19th centuries and has an elaborate font dating from 1470 depicting the sacraments and stained-glass designed by William Morris depicting Faith, Hope and Charity.

== Notable people ==
- Sir Astley Cooper, 1st Baronet (1768–1841), surgeon and anatomist, born in Brooke.
- Reverend Dr. William Beal (1815–1870), Vicar of Brooke 1847-1870.
- George Ewart Evans (1909–1988), teacher, write and folklorist, lived in Brooke.
- Bernard Matthews (1930–2010), founder of Bernard Matthews Foods, born in Brooke.
- Caroline Cossey (b. 1954), model and actress, born in Brooke.
