= A Record of Buddhist Practices Sent Home from the Southern Sea =

Buddhist travelogue by the Tang Chinese monk Yijing

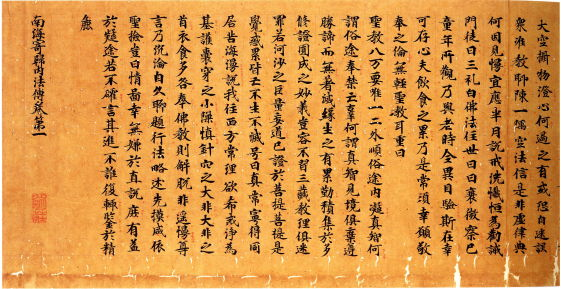
- Excerpt of a scroll from Yijing's Record of Buddhist Practices in Tenri, Nara, Japan
- Traditional Chinese: 《南海寄歸内法傳》
- Simplified Chinese: 《南海寄归内法传》
- Literal meaning: An Account of the Inner Law Sent Home from the Southern Sea
Transcriptions
Standard Mandarin
- Hanyu Pinyin: Nánhǎi Jìguī Nèifǎ Zhuán
- Wade–Giles: Nan-hai Chi-kuei Nei-fa Chuan

A Record of Buddhist Practices Sent Home from the Southern Sea, also known as the Nanhai Jigui Neifa Zhuan and by other translations, is a Buddhist travelogue by the Tang Chinese monk Yijing detailing his twenty five-year stay in India and Srivijaya between the years 671 and 695 CE.

== Name ==
The Chinese name Nánhǎi Jìguī Nèifǎ Zhuàn literally means "An Account of the Inner Law Sent Home from the Southern Sea", in reference to Buddhism's idea of dharma as a cosmic law and the Chinese name for the South China Sea. The work has appeared in English under various translations of varying literalness, from Accounts of the Inner Law Sent Home from the South Sea to Takakusu's Record of the Buddhist Religion as Practised in India and the Malay Archipelago to Record of Buddhist Practices.

== Content ==
The book records Yijing's stay at Nalanda, a Buddhist Mahāvihāra in North-eastern India, and describes the life and practices of the monks therein. It also provides geographical and religious information on countries in the South Sea area, of which there were more than ten, during the Tang dynasty. It recorded that, for example, Buddhism flourished in the countries of the South Sea, and most of these countries practiced Theravada Buddhism, but Buddhism in Funan had been eliminated after it was conquered.

The book is divided into forty sections. Unlike his predecessor Xuanzang's travelogue, which gives descriptions of the area he visited, Yijing prefers to restrict itself to descriptions of the customs, rules, and regulations of Buddhism as it was practised in its homeland. His detailed account of monastic rules and practices is valuable for the study of Buddhism and Buddhist literature of the period as many of the sources he cited are now lost.

== Editions ==
The first English translation was produced by Junjiro Takakusu in 1896.

== See also ==
- Great Tang Records on the Western Regions
