= Huisheng (monk) =

Chinese Buddhist monk who travelled to medieval India

- Chinese: 惠生
Transcriptions
Standard Mandarin
- Hanyu Pinyin: Huìshēng
- Wade–Giles: Hui-sheng

Huisheng
- Chinese: 慧生
Transcriptions
Standard Mandarin
- Hanyu Pinyin: Huìshēng
- Wade–Giles: Hui-sheng

Daosheng
- Chinese: 道生
Transcriptions
Standard Mandarin
- Hanyu Pinyin: Dàoshēng
- Wade–Giles: Tao-sheng

Huisheng or Hui Sheng (fl. 510s & 520s), also known as Hoei Sing, Hwei Sang, and by other romanizations, was a Chinese Buddhist monk who travelled to medieval India with Songyun and others.

Huisheng and his companions were dispatched from the Tuoba Northern Wei to seek Buddhist scriptures in AD 518. They only reached as far as Gandhara but, receiving 170 sutras, they returned in 521.

== Works ==
Huisheng and Songyun both composed accounts of their travels. Huisheng's is variously known as The Travels of Huisheng (t 《惠生/慧生行傳》, s 《惠生/慧生行传》, Huìshēng Xíngzhuàn), The Record of Huisheng, Envoy to the Western Regions (t 《惠生/慧生使西域傳》, s 《惠生/慧生使西域传》, Huìshēng Shǐ Xīyù Zhuàn), and the Account of the Northern Wei Monk Huisheng, Envoy to the Western Regions (t 《北魏僧惠生/慧生使西域記》, s 《北魏僧惠生/慧生使西域记》, Běiwèi Sēng Huìshēng Shǐ Xīyù Jì). It and Songyun's record are now lost in the original, but were largely preserved through quotes and commentary in books by other authors. Samuel Beal's account was based on the version in the 5th book of Yang Xuanzhi's 6th-century History of the Temples of Luoyang.

=== Editions ===
- Neumann, Karl Friedrich, ed. (1833), "Pilgerfahrten Buddhistischer Priester von China nach Indien: Song Yun Tse und Hoei Seng" [Pilgrimages of Buddhist Priests from China to India: Songyun and Huisheng] (PDF), Zeitschrift für die Historische Theologie [Journal of Historical Theology], Vol. III (in German), pp. 152–177.
- Beal, Samuel, ed. (1869), "The Mission of Hwui Seng and Sung Yun to Obtain Buddhist Books in the West (518 A.D.)", Travels of Fah-Hian and Sung-Yun, Buddhist Pilgrims, from China to India (400 A.D. and 518 A.D.), London: Trübner & Co., pp. 174–208.
- Beal, Samuel, ed. (1884), "The Mission of Sung-Yun and Hwei Săng to Obtain Buddhist Books in the West (518 A.D.)", Si-Yu-Ki: Buddhist Records of the Western World by Hiuen Tsiang, Trübner's Oriental Series, vol. I, London: Trübner & Co., pp. lxxxiv–cviii.
