= Ancient history of Afghanistan =

The ancient history of Afghanistan, also referred to as the pre-Islamic period of Afghanistan, dates back to the prehistoric era and the Helmand civilization around 3300–2350 B.C. Archaeological exploration began in Afghanistan in earnest after World War II and proceeded until the late 1970s during the Soviet–Afghan War. Archaeologists and historians suggest that humans were living in Afghanistan at least 50,000 years ago, and that farming communities of the region were among the earliest in the world. Urbanized culture has existed in the land from between 3000 and 2000 BC. Artifacts typical of the Paleolithic, Mesolithic, Neolithic, Bronze, and Iron ages have been found inside Afghanistan.

After the Indus Valley Civilisation stretched up to northeast Afghanistan, it was inhabited by the Iranic tribes and controlled by the Medes until about 500 BC when Darius the Great (Darius I) marched with his Persian army to make it part of the Achaemenid Empire. In 330 BC, Alexander the Great of Macedonia invaded the land after defeating Darius III of Persia in the Battle of Gaugamela. Much of Afghanistan became part of the Seleucid Empire followed by the Greco-Bactrian Kingdom. Seleucus I Nicator was defeated by Chandragupta Maurya and gave his daughter in a peace treaty. The land was inhabited by various tribes and ruled by many different kingdoms for the next two millennia. Before the arrival of Islam in the 7th century, there were a number of religions practiced in modern-day Afghanistan. Zoroastrianism and Ancient Iranian religions were practiced in western Afganistan (Khorasan and Herat). Hinduism and Buddhism was primarily practiced in regions of Eastern (Kabul) and South-Eastern Afganistan (Kandahar). The Kafiristan (present-day Nuristan) region, in the Hindu Kush mountain range, was not converted until the 19th century.

== Prehistoric era ==
=== Paleolithic ===
Louis Dupree, the University of Pennsylvania, the Smithsonian Institution and others suggest that humans were living in Afghanistan at least 50,000 years ago and that farming communities of the region were among the earliest in the world. Evidence of early human settlements at cave sites such as Darra-e Kur suggest that hunter-gatherer societies existed in the region by at least 30,000 B.C.

The earliest evidence of Neolithic farming dates to the 7th millennia B.C. where excavations at Said Qala Tepe in southern Kandahar have revealed the remains of domesticated sheep, goats, and cattle alongside plant material from domesticated wheat and barley. By the 5th millennia B.C., the Neolithic agricultural transition spread throughout southern and northern Afghanistan, as evidenced by the archaeological findings at permanent settlements such as Mundigak and the Aq Kupruk cave complex.

These findings place Afghanistan within the broader arc of the Neolithic agricultural transition radiating outward from the Fertile Crescent, and suggest an eastward flow of cultural and technological exchange from sites such as Tepe Sialk in Iran and Mehrgarh in Baluchistan, Pakistan, while Afghanistan’s own highland communities adapted farming practices to local ecological conditions.

=== Bronze Age ===
Afghanistan seems in prehistory, as well as in ancient and modern times, to have been connected by culture and trade with the neighbouring regions. Urban civilization may have begun as early as 3000 to 2000 BC. Archaeological finds indicate the possible beginnings of the Bronze Age, which would ultimately spread throughout the ancient world from Afghanistan. It is also believed that the region had early trade contacts with Mesopotamia.

==== Bactria ====
Partially located within the present borders of modern-day Afghanistan, Bactria (2300-1700 BCE) was an ancient Bronze Age Iranian civilization located in the area south of the Oxus River (modern Amu Darya) and north of the Hindu Kush. The modern archaeological designation for this ancient civilization is Bactria–Margiana Archaeological Complex (BMAC), and is also known as the Oxus civilization. Located at the confluence of several important trade routes, this mostly nomadic population accumulated vast amounts of wealth and developed its first proto-urban civilization during the 2nd millennia BCE.

BMAC communities engaged in long-distance trade with the Indus Valley and Mesopotamia, exchanging goods like lapis lazuli and turquoise. The decline of the BMAC around 1700 BCE coincides with the arrival of Indo-Iranian groups in Central Asia, marking a cultural shift toward the Iron Age. While some scholars suggest the BMAC population may have been early Indo-Iranians, this remains uncertain.

==== Indus Valley Civilization ====
The Indus Valley Civilisation (IVC) was a Bronze Age civilization (3300–1300 BCE). Evidence of an Indus Valley site from the Mature Harappan period (2600-1900 BCE) has been found on the Oxus River at Shortugai in northern Afghanistan. Apart from Shortughai is Mundigak, another notable site. There are several smaller IVC colonies to be found in Afghanistan.

== Aryan expansion into Mesopotamia and the Medean rule (1500 BC–551 BC) ==
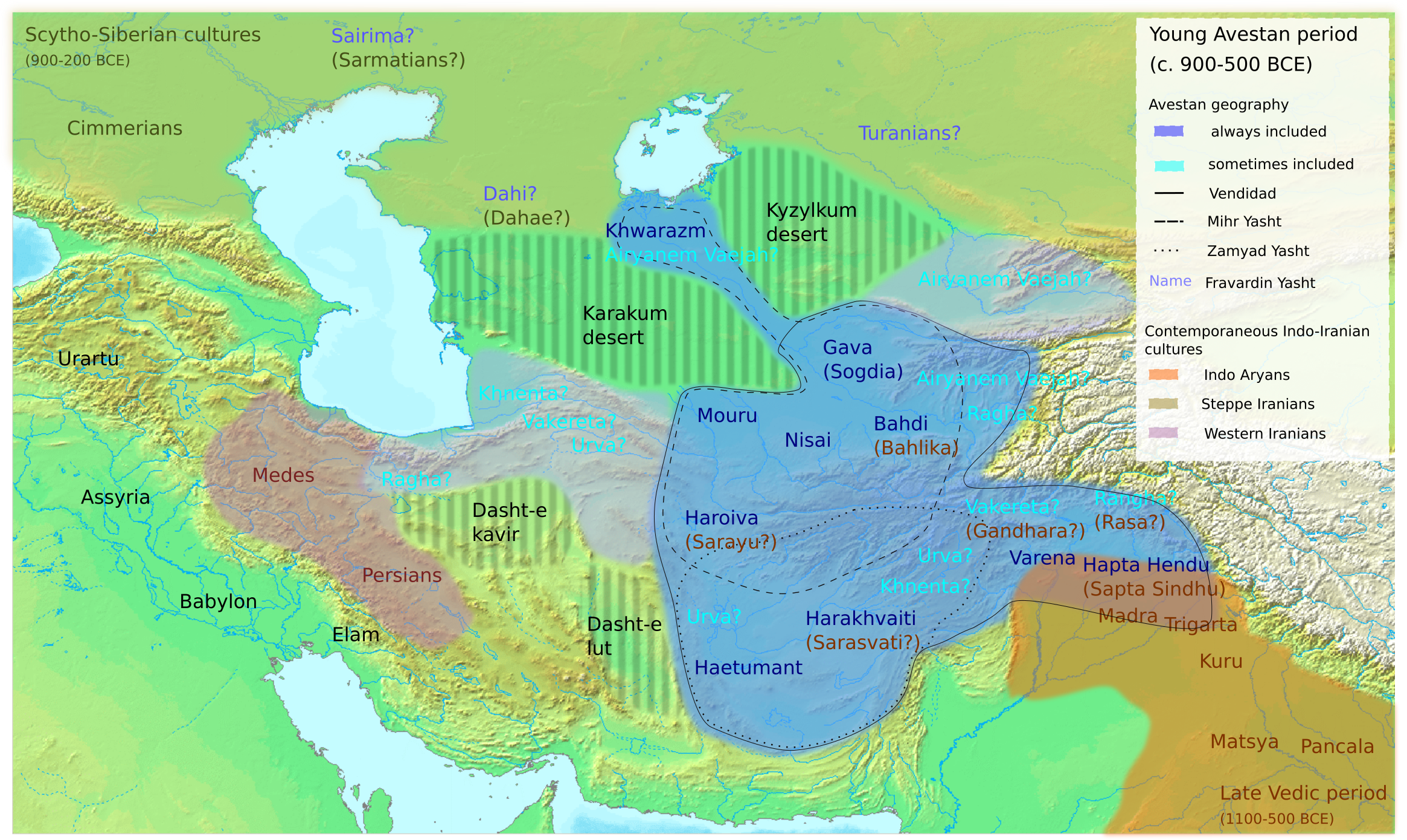
Geographical horizon of the People of the Avesta vis-a-vis other Indo-Iranian groups during the Young Avestan period (c. 900-500 BCE).

Between 2000–1200 BC, a branch of Indo-European-speaking tribes known as the Aryans began migrating into the region. This is part of a dispute in regards to the Indo-Aryan migration. They split into Iranic peoples, Nuristani, and Indo-Aryan groups at an early stage, possibly between 1500 and 1000 BC in what is today Afghanistan or much earlier as eastern remnants of the Indo-Aryans drifted much further west as with the Mitanni. The Iranians dominated the modern day plateau, while the Indo-Aryans ultimately headed towards the Indian subcontinent. The Avesta is believed to have been composed possibly as early as 1800 BC and written in ancient Ariana (Aryana), the earliest name of Afghanistan which indicates an early link with today's Iranian tribes to the west, or adjacent regions in Central Asia or northeastern Iran in the 6th century BC. Due to the similarity between early Avestan and Sanskrit (and other related early Indo-European languages such as Latin and Ancient Greek), it is believed that the split between the old Persians and Indo-Aryan tribes had taken place at least by 1000 BC. There are striking similarities between Avestan and Sanskrit, which may support the notion that the split was contemporary with the Indo-Aryans living in Afghanistan at a very early stage. Also, the Avesta itself divides into Old and New sections and neither mention the Medes who are known to have ruled Afghanistan starting around 700 BC. This suggests an early time-frame for the Avesta that has yet to be exactly determined as most academics believe it was written over the course of centuries if not millennia. Much of the archaeological data comes from the Bactria-Margiana Archaeological Complex (BMAC and Indus Valley civilization) that probably played a key role in early Aryanic civilization in Afghanistan.

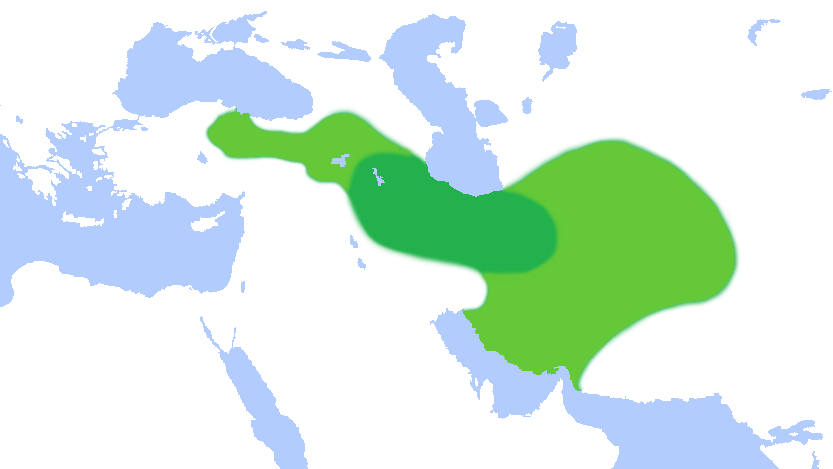
Territory controlled by the Median Empire

The Indo-Aryan inhabitants of the region- mainly in the southern and eastern parts of the country were adherents of Hinduism. Notable among these were the Gandharis The Pashayi and Nuristanis are present day examples of these Indo-Iranian people.

The Medes, a Western Iranian people, arrived from what is today Kurdistan sometime around the 700s BC and came to dominate most of ancient Afghanistan. They were an early tribe that forged the first empire on the present Iranian plateau and sister-nations with the Persians whom they initially dominated in the province of Fars to the south. Median control of parts of far off Afghanistan would last until Cyrus the Great, prince of the Persians, assassinated and ultimately replaced his Median emperor father-in-law from rule.

== Achaemenid invasion and Zoroastrianism (550 BC–331 BC) ==
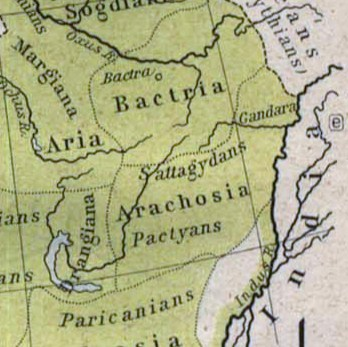
Arachosia, Aria and Bactria were the more eastern ancient satraps of the Achaemenid Empire that made up most of what is now Afghanistan during 500 B.C. The inhabitants of Arachosia were known as Pactyans, possibly today's Pakhtuns or Pashtuns.

The city of Bactra (which later became Balkh), is believed to have been the home of Zarathustra, who founded the Zoroastrian religion. The Avesta refers to eastern Bactria as being the home of the Zoroastrian faith. Regardless of the debate as to where Zoroaster was from, Zoroastrianism spread to become one of the world's most influential religions and became the main faith of the old Aryan people for centuries. It also remained the official religion of Persia until the defeat of the Sassanian ruler Yazdegerd III—over a thousand years after its founding—by Muslim Arabs. In what is today southern Iran, the Persians emerged to challenge Median supremacy on the Iranian plateau. By 550 BC, the Persians had replaced Median rule with their own dominion and even began to expand past previous Median imperial borders. Both Gandhara and Kamboja Mahajanapadas of the Buddhist texts soon fell a prey to the Achaemenian Dynasty during the reign of Achaemenid, Cyrus the Great (558–530 BC), or in the first year of Darius I, marking the region or of the easternmost provinces of the empire, located partly in nowadays Afghanistan. According to Pliny's evidence, Cyrus the Great (Cyrus II) had destroyed Kapisa in Capiscene which was a Kamboja city. The former region of Gandhara and Kamboja (upper Indus) had constituted seventh satrapy of the Achaemenid Empire and annually contributed 170 talents of gold dust as a tribute to the Achaemenids.

Bactria had a special position in old Afghanistan, being the capital of a vice-kingdom. By the 4th century BC, Persian control of outlying areas and the internal cohesion of the empire had become somewhat tenuous. Although distant provinces like Bactriana had often been restless under Achaemenid rule, Bactrian troops nevertheless fought in the decisive Battle of Gaugamela in 330 BC against the advancing armies of Alexander the Great. The Achaemenids were decisively defeated by Alexander and retreated from his advancing army of Greco-Macedonians and their allies. Darius III, the last Achaemenid ruler, tried to flee to Bactria but was assassinated by a subordinate lord, the Bactrian-born Bessus, who proclaimed himself the new ruler of Persia as Artaxerxes (V). Bessus was unable to mount a successful resistance to the growing military might of Alexander's army so he fled to his native Bactria, where he attempted to rally local tribes to his side but was instead turned over to Alexander who proceeded to have him tortured and executed for having committed regicide.

== Alexander the Great to Greco-Bactrian rule (330 BC – c. 150 BC) ==
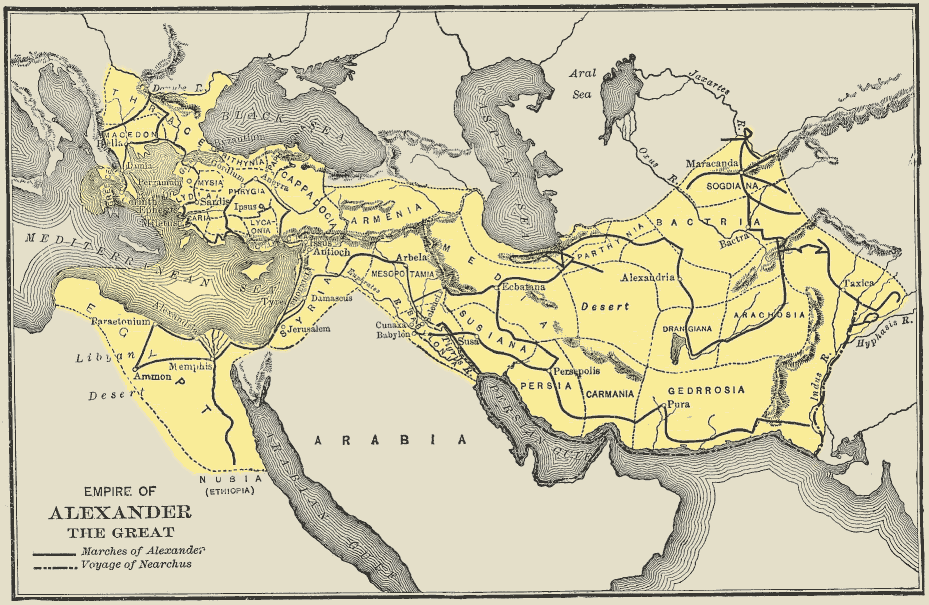
Empire of Alexander the Great

Moving thousands of kilometers eastward from recently subdued Persia, the Macedonian leader Alexander the Great, encountered fierce resistance from the local tribes of Aria, Drangiana, Arachosia (South and Eastern Afghanistan, North-West Pakistan) and Bactria (North and Central Afghanistan). One of the fiercest battles that he faced was in Herat. One of his top commanding officers was killed by the rebels and he had to go there himself. He couldn't defeat them in time and he ended up burning down the forest to finish the rebellion.

Upon Alexander's death in 323 BC, his empire, which had never been politically consolidated, broke apart as his companions began to divide it amongst themselves. Alexander's cavalry commander, Seleucus, took nominal control of the eastern lands and founded the Seleucid dynasty. Under the Seleucids, as under Alexander, Greek colonists and soldiers colonized Bactria, roughly corresponding to modern Afghanistan's borders. However, the majority of Macedonian soldiers of Alexander the Great wanted to leave the east and return home to Greece. Later, Seleucus sought to guard his eastern frontier and moved Ionian Greeks (also known as Yavanas to many local groups) to Bactria in the 3rd century BC.

Greece had one of the most advanced civilizations at that period. Wherever they went, they left and gained something from cultures and ultimately, they had a civilization that was compromised from other top civilizations of the time. Greek men were marrying with other women and this helped the process of mixing the cultures a lot.

=== Maurya Empire ===
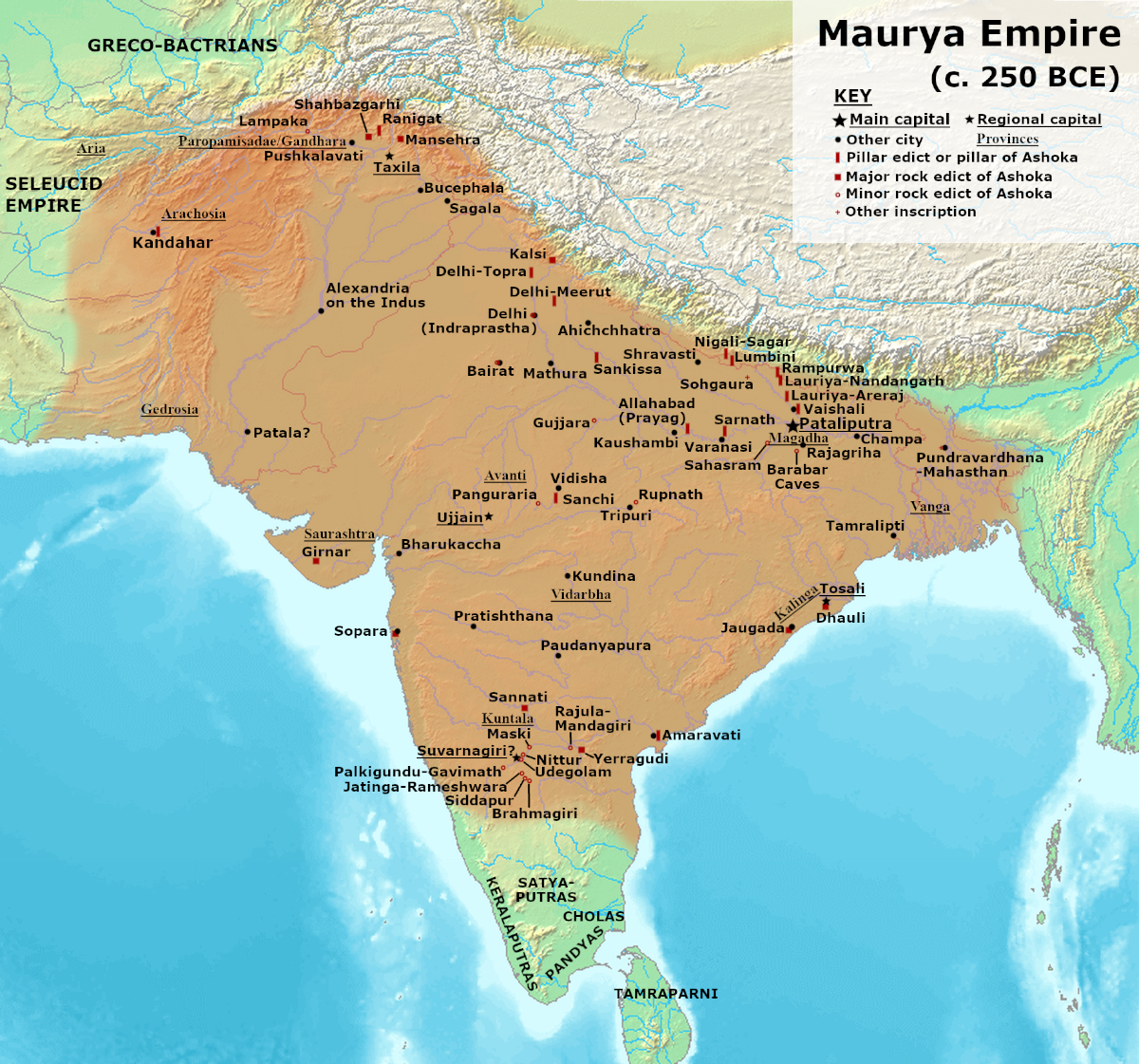
Maurya Empire at its maximum extent

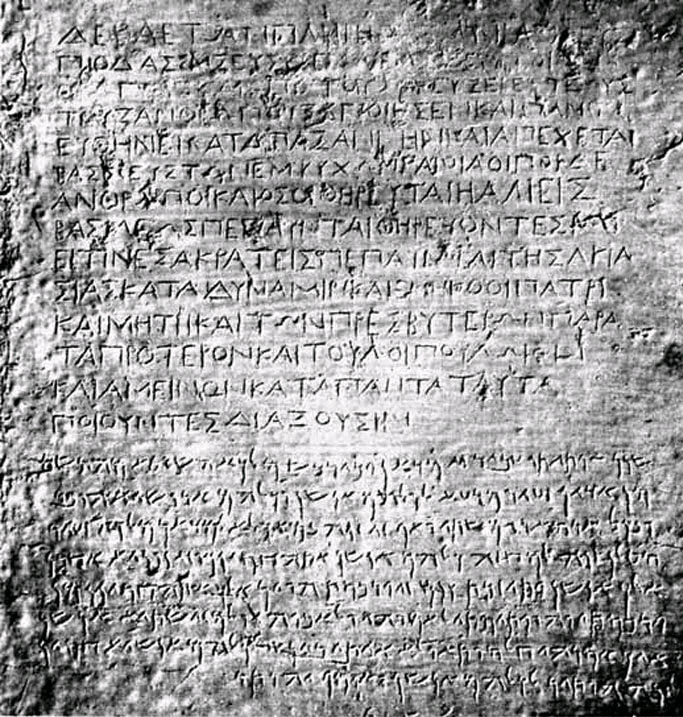
Bilingual edict (Greek and Aramaic) by Emperor Ashoka, from Kandahar – Afghan National Museum. (Click image for translation.)

While the Diadochi were warring amongst themselves, the Mauryan Empire was developing in the northern part of the Indian subcontinent. The founder of the empire, Chandragupta Maurya, confronted a Macedonian invasion force led by Seleucus I in 305 BC and following a brief conflict, an agreement was reached as Seleucus ceded Gandhara and Arachosia (centered around ancient Kandahar) and areas south of Bagram (corresponding to the extreme south-east of modern Afghanistan) to the Mauryans. During the 120 years of the Mauryans in southern Afghanistan, Buddhism was introduced and eventually become a major religion alongside Zoroastrianism and local pagan beliefs. The ancient Grand Trunk Road was built linking what is now Kabul to various cities in the Punjab and the Gangetic Plain. Commerce, art, and architecture (seen especially in the construction of stupas) developed during this period. It reached its high point under Emperor Ashoka whose edicts, roads, and rest stops were found throughout the subcontinent. Although the vast majority of them throughout the subcontinent were written in Prakrit, Afghanistan is notable for the inclusion of 2 Greek and Aramaic ones alongside the court language of the Mauryans.

Inscriptions made by the Mauryan Emperor Ashoka, a fragment of Edict 13 in Greek, as well as a full Edict, written in both Greek and Aramaic has been discovered in Old Kandahar. It is said to be written in excellent Classical Greek, using sophisticated philosophical terms. In this Edict, Ashoka uses the word Eusebeia ("Piety") as the Greek translation for the ubiquitous "Dharma" of his other Edicts written in Prakrit:

"Ten years (of reign) having been completed, King Piodasses (Ashoka) made known (the doctrine of) Piety (εὐσέβεια, Eusebeia) to men; and from this moment he has made men more pious, and everything thrives throughout the whole world. And the king abstains from (killing) living beings, and other men and those who (are) huntsmen and fishermen of the king have desisted from hunting. And if some (were) intemperate, they have ceased from their intemperance as was in their power; and obedient to their father and mother and to the elders, in opposition to the past also in the future, by so acting on every occasion, they will live better and more happily." (Trans. by G.P. Carratelli)

The last ruler in the region was probably Subhagasena (Sophagasenus of Polybius), who, in all probability, belonged to the Ashvaka (q.v.) background.

=== Greco-Bactrians ===
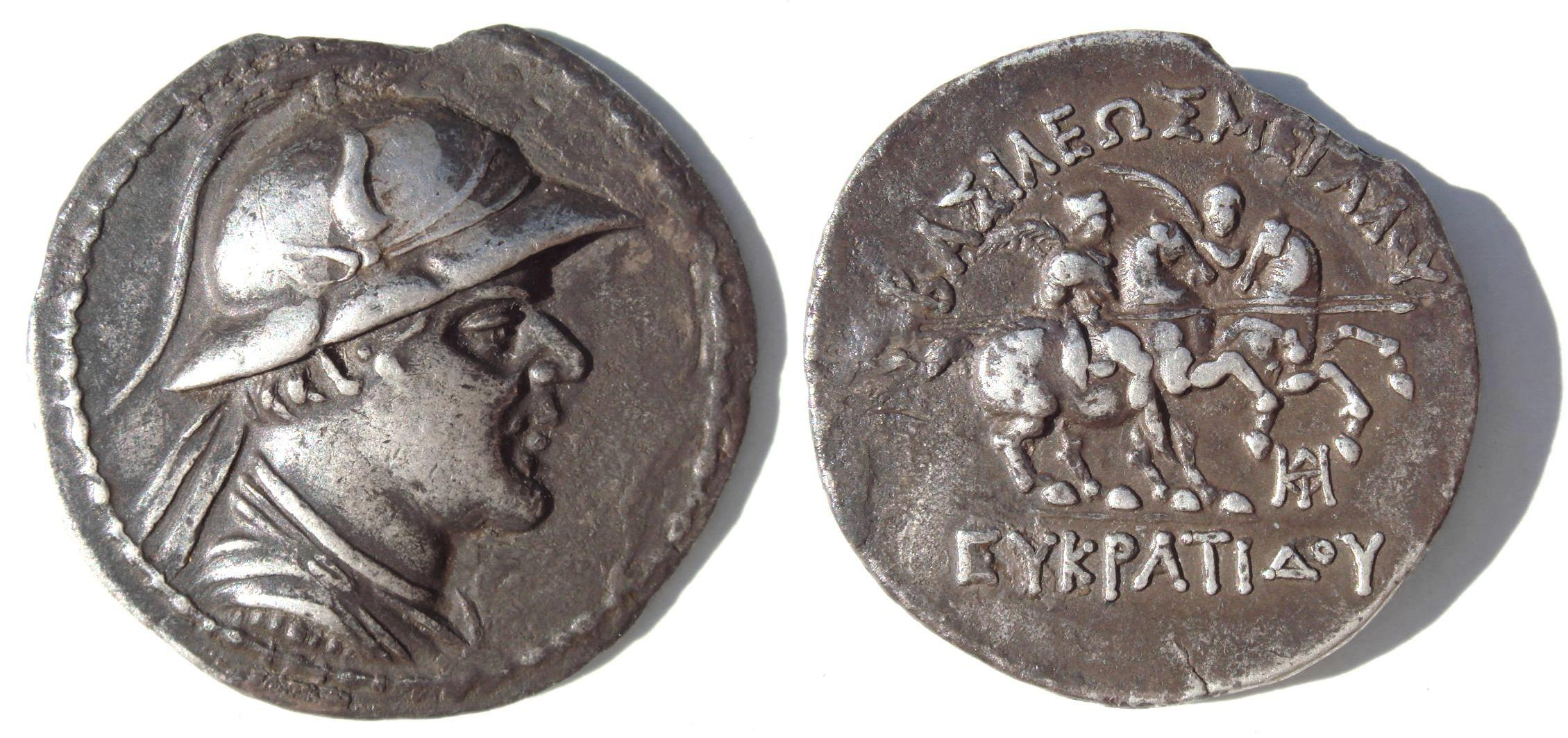
Coin of the Greco-Bactrian king Eucratides (171-145 BC)

In the middle of the 3rd century BC, an independent, Hellenistic state was declared in Bactria and eventually the control of the Seleucids and Mauryans was overthrown in western and southern Afghanistan. Graeco-Bactrian rule spread until it included a large territory which stretched from Turkmenistan in the west to the Punjab in India in the east by about 170 BC. Graeco-Bactrian rule was eventually defeated by a combination of internecine disputes that plagued Greek and Hellenized rulers to the west, continual conflict with Indian kingdoms, as well as the pressure of two groups of nomadic invaders from Central Asia—the Parthians and Sakas.

== Kushan Empire (150 BC–300 AD) ==
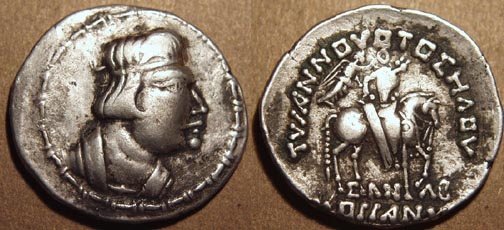
Silver tetradrachm of Kushan king Heraios (1–30 AD) in Greco-Bactrian style, with horseman crowned by the Greek goddess of victory Nike. Greek legend: ΤVΡΑΝΝΟVΟΤΟΣ ΗΛΟV – ΣΛΝΛΒ – ΚΟÞÞΑΝΟΥ "Of the Tyrant Heraios, Sanav, the Kushan" (the meaning of "Sanav" is unknown).

In the 3rd and 2nd centuries BC, the Parthians, a nomadic Iranian peoples, arrived in Western Asia. While they made large inroads into the modern-day territory of Afghanistan, about 100 years later another Indo-European group from the north—the Kushans (a subgroup of the tribe called the Yuezhi by the Chinese)—entered the region of Afghanistan and established an empire lasting almost four centuries, which would dominate most of the Afghanistan region.

The Kushan Empire spread from the Kabul River valley to defeat other Central Asian tribes that had previously conquered parts of the northern central Iranian Plateau once ruled by the Parthians. By the middle of the 1st century BC, the Kushans' base of control became Afghanistan and their empire spanned from the north of the Pamir mountains to the Ganges river valley in India. During rule of Kanishka, they had 2 seasonal capital cities which were Kabul in Spring and Summer then moving to Peshawar for Fall and Winter. Early in the 2nd century under Kanishka, the most powerful of the Kushan rulers, the empire reached its greatest geographic and cultural breadth to become a center of literature and art. Kanishka extended Kushan control to the mouth of the Indus River on the Arabian Sea, into Kashmir, and into what is today the Chinese-controlled area north of Tibet. Kanishka was a patron of religion and the arts. It was during his reign that Buddhism, which was promoted in northern India earlier by the Mauryan emperor Ashoka (c. 260 BC–232 BC), reached its zenith in Central Asia. Though the Kushanas supported local Buddhists and Hindus as well as the worship of various local deities.

== Sasanian & Hephthalite invasions (300–650) ==
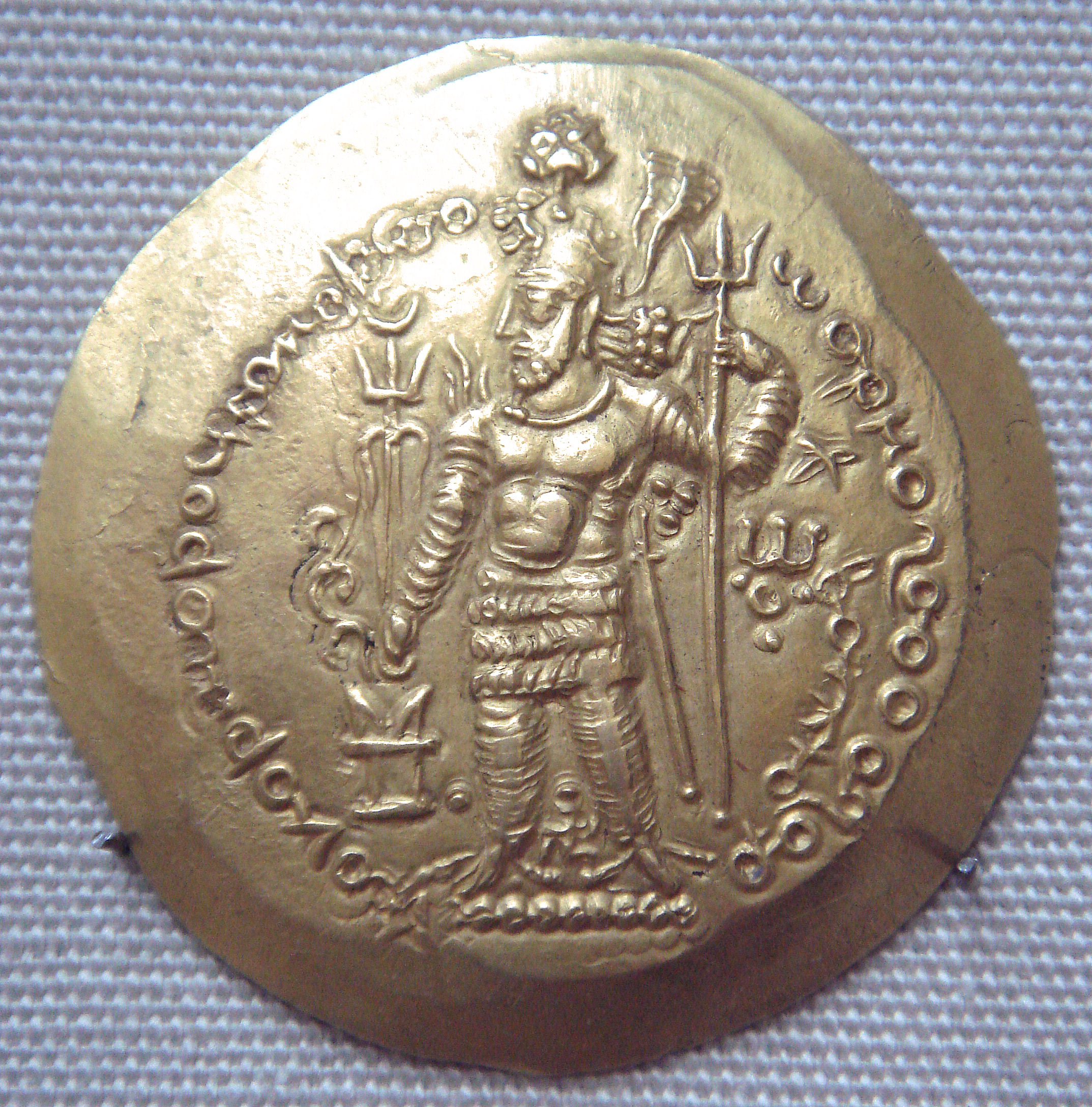
Coin of Hormizd I Kushanshah, issued in Khorasan, and derived from Kushan designs

In the 3rd century, Kushan control fragmented into semi-independent kingdoms that became easy targets for conquest by the rising Iranian dynasty, the Sasanians (c. 224–561) which annexed Afghanistan by 300 AD. In these far off easternmost territories, they established vassal kings as rulers, known as the Kushanshahs. Sasanian control was tenuous at times as numerous challenges from Central Asian tribes led to instability and constant warfare in the region.

The disunited Kushan and Sasanian kingdoms were in a poor position to meet the threat several waves of Xionite/Huna invaders from the north from the 4th century onwards. In particular, the Hephthalites (or Ebodalo; Bactrian script ηβοδαλο) swept out of Central Asia during the 5th century into Bactria and Iran, overwhelming the last of the Kushan kingdoms. Historians believe that Hephthalite control continued for a century and was marked by constant warfare with the Sassanians to the west who exerted nominal control over the region. By the middle of the 6th century, the Hephthalites were defeated in the territories north of the Amu Darya (the Oxus River of antiquity) by another group of Central Asian nomads, the Göktürks, and by the resurgent Sassanians in the lands south of the Amu Darya. It was the ruler of western Göktürks, Sijin (a.k.a. Sinjibu, Silzibul and Yandu Muchu Khan) who led the forces against the Hepthalites who were defeated at the Battle of Chach (Tashkent) and at the Battle of Bukhara.

== Kabul Shahi ==
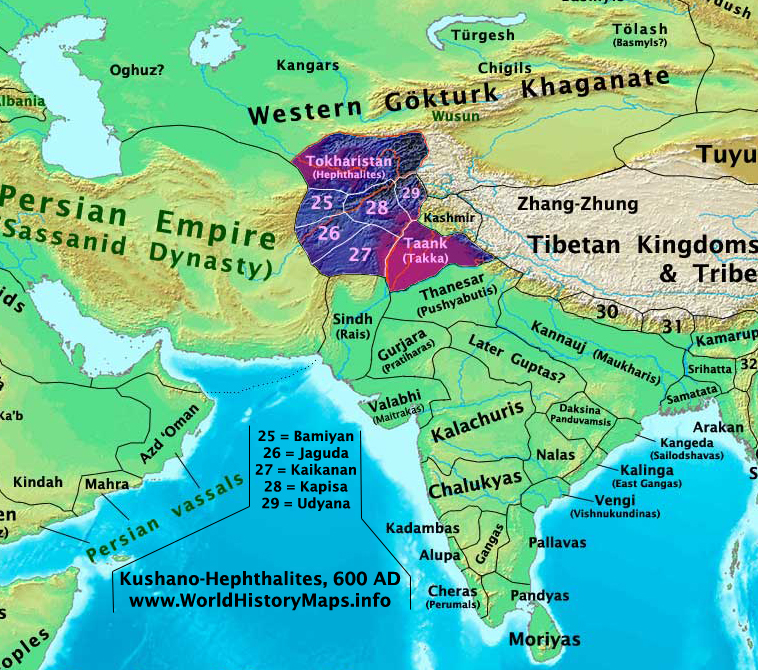
Kushano-Hephthalite kingdoms around 600 AD

The Shahi dynasties ruled portions of the Kabul Valley (in eastern Afghanistan) and the old province of Gandhara (northern Pakistan and Kashmir) from the decline of the Kushan Empire in the 3rd century to the early 9th century. They are split into two eras the Buddhist Turk Shahis and the later Hindu Shahis with the change-over occurring around 870, and ruled up until the Islamic conquest of Afghanistan.

When Xuanzang visited the region early in the 7th century, the Kabul region was ruled by a Kshatriya king, who is identified as the Shahi Khingal, and whose name has been found in an inscription found in Gardez. The Turkic Shahi regency was overthrown and replaced by a Mohyal Shahi dynasty of Brahmins who began the first phase of the Hindu Shahi dynasty.

These Hindu kings of Kabul and Gandhara may have had links to some ruling families in neighboring Kashmir and other areas to the east. The Shahis were rulers of predominantly Buddhist, Zoroastrian, Hindu and Muslim populations and were thus patrons of numerous faiths, and various artifacts and coins from their rule have been found that display their multicultural domain. In 964 AD, the last Mohyal Shahi was succeeded by the Janjua overlord, Jayapala, of the Panduvanshi dynasty. The last Shahi emperors Jayapala, Anandapala and Tirlochanpala fought the Muslim Ghaznavids of Ghazna and were gradually defeated. Their remaining army were eventually exiled into northern India.

== Archaeological remnants ==
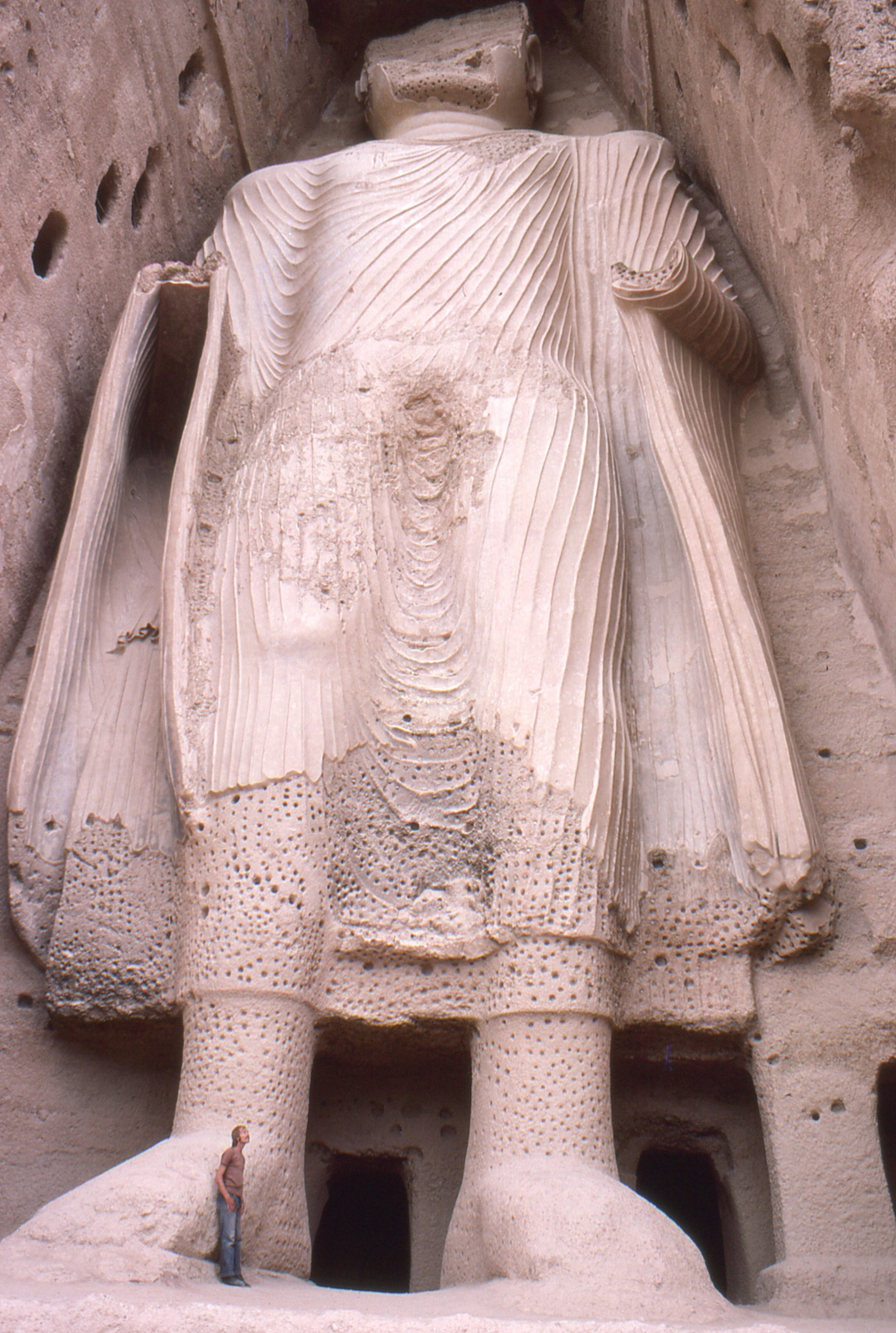
One of the Buddhas of Bamiyan. Buddhism was widespread in the region before the Islamic conquest of Afghanistan.

Most of the Zoroastrian, Greek, Hellenistic, Buddhist, Hindu and other indigenous cultures were replaced by the coming of Islam and little influence remains in Afghanistan today. Along ancient trade routes, however, stone monuments of the once flourishing Buddhist culture did exist as reminders of the past. The two massive sandstone Buddhas of Bamyan, 35 and 53 meters high, overlooked the ancient route through Bamyan to Balkh and dated from the 3rd and 5th centuries. They survived until 2001, when they were destroyed by the Taliban. In this and other key places in Afghanistan, archaeologists have located frescoes, stucco decorations, statuary, and rare objects from as far away as China, Phoenicia, and Rome, which were crafted as early as the 2nd century and bear witness to the influence of these ancient civilizations upon Afghanistan.

One of the early Buddhist schools, the Mahāsāṃghika-Lokottaravāda, were known to be prominent in the area of Bamiyan. The Chinese Buddhist monk Xuanzang visited a Lokottaravāda monastery in the 7th century CE, at Bamiyan, Afghanistan, and this monastery site has since been rediscovered by archaeologists. Birchbark and palm leaf manuscripts of texts in this monastery's collection, including Mahāyāna sūtras, have been discovered at the site, and these are now located in the Schøyen Collection. Some manuscripts are in the Gāndhārī language and Kharoṣṭhī script, while others are in Sanskrit and written in forms of the Gupta script. Manuscripts and fragments that have survived from this monastery's collection include well-known Buddhist texts such as the Mahāparinirvāṇa Sūtra (from the Āgamas), the Diamond Sūtra (Vajracchedikā Prajñāpāramitā), the Medicine Buddha Sūtra, and the Śrīmālādevī Siṃhanāda Sūtra.

In 2010, reports stated that about 42 Buddhist relics have been discovered in the Logar Province of Afghanistan, which is south of Kabul. Some of these items date back to the 2nd century according to Archaeologists. The items included two Buddhist temples (Stupas), Buddha statues, frescos, silver and gold coins and precious beads.

There is a temple, stupas, beautiful rooms, big and small statues, two with the length of seven and nine meters, colorful frescos ornamented with gold and some coins... Some of the relics date back to the fifth century (AD)... We have come across signs that there are items maybe going back to the era before Christ or prehistory... We need foreign assistance to preserve these and their expertise to help us with further excavations.

— Mohammad Nader Rasouli, Afghan Archaeological Department

Chronological chart for the historical periods of Afghanistan

== See also ==
- Pre Islamic Hindu and Buddhist heritage of Afghanistan
- Pre-Islamic scripts in Afghanistan
- Zunbils

== Other sources ==
- Ahmed, Akbar S. 1980. TAJIK economy and society. London: Routledge and Kegan Paul.
- Bryant, Edwin. 'The Quest for the Origins of Vedic Culture: The Indo-Aryan Migration Debate' (Oxford: Oxford University Press, 2003).
- Dupree, Louis. 'Afghanistan' (Oxford: Oxford University Press, 1997).
- Ewans, Martin. Afghanistan: A Short History of Its People and Politics, Harper Perennial; 1st Perennial ed edition (September 1, 2002)
- Harmatta, János, ed., 1994. History of civilizations of Central Asia, Volume II. The development of sedentary and nomadic civilizations: 700 B.C. to A.D. 250. Paris, UNESCO Publishing.
- Hill, John E. 2004. The Western Regions according to the Hou Hanshu. Draft annotated English translation.
- Hill, John E. 2004. The Peoples of the West from the Weilue 魏略 by Yu Huan 魚豢: A Third Century Chinese Account Composed between 239 and 265 AD. Draft annotated English translation.
- Holt, Frank L. Thundering Zeus: The Making of Hellenistic Bactria, University of California Press (March, 1999)
- Kriwaczek, Paul. In Search of Zarathustra: Across Iran and Central Asia to Find the World's First Prophet, Vintage (March 9, 2004)
- Litvinsky, B. A., ed., 1996. History of civilizations of Central Asia, Volume III. The crossroads of civilizations: A.D. 250 to 750. Paris, UNESCO Publishing.
- Olmstead, A.T. History of the Persian Empire, University Of Chicago Press (February 15, 1959)
- Reat, Ross. 'Buddhism: A History', (Jain Publishing Company, 1996).
- Rowland, Benjamin, Jr. Ancient Art from Afghanistan: Treasures of the Kabul Museum, Ayer Co Pub (October, 1981)
- Sarianidi, Viktor. 1985. The Golden Hoard of Bactria: From the Tillya-tepe Excavations in Northern Afghanistan. Harry N. Abrams, Inc. New York.
- Shayegan, Rahim. The Avesta and the Bactria-Margiana Archaeological Complex
- "The Káfirs of the Hindu-Kush" By Sir George Scott Robertson (1896)
