= Shamsher Ghar =

Archeological site in southern Kandahar, Afghanistan

Shmsher Ghar (Pashto: شمشير غار) is an archeological cave site in southern Kandahar, Afghanistan. It is located about 15 miles west of Kandahar City and 3.5 miles northeast of Panjwayi District.

== Geography ==
The elevation of Shamsher Ghar is 1193 meters, around 100 meters above Arghndab River. The nearest village is Badwan Kalay (Village of Badwan).

Shamsher Ghar has five chambers: The first is 11 meters long, second is 17 meters long, and others are same as the first one.

== History ==
According to Louis Dupree's investigation in 1951, the site was created in Pliocene period. He claims that evidence of humans in this cave dates to approximately 2000 years ago and continued till 1222, when the Mongol Empire captured Afghanistan.

Based on historical background there were three main periods of human civilizations in Shamsher Ghar:

First Kushan Period: This was started in 100 BC and continued for two centuries.

Second Kushan Period: Started in 100 AD and ended in 300. This period is identified by some metals.

Third Kushan Period: Started in 300 AD and extended for four centuries. This is identified with some ancient paintings.

Muslim Conquest Era: Started after 700 and ended with Mongol domination.
