= Morasi Gonday =

Morasi Gonday (Hill of Morasi; Pashto: مراسي غونډۍ or دیمراسي غونډۍ) is a Bronze Age archeological site in Kandahar, Afghanistan. It is located about 27 km Kandahar City, and 6.5 km Panjwayi District.

== Geography ==
Morasi is located at 34° 90’ N, 65° 30’ E, near to Morasi village. The bound rises approximately 3.5 meters above the surrounding earth surface.

== History ==
Morasi Gonday was discovered by Louis Dupree in 1951. He found four trenches, but only the largest (2×6 m) was excavated to sterile soil, at a depth of 6.6 m. Radiocarbon dates from this and the site suggest that the place was occupied between 2000/2500 BC. The Morāsī IV layers were disturbed and included pottery from the early South Asian historic period (after 500 B.C.E.) and the Islamic period. When combined with Kushan burials found in the upper levels of occupation III, it shows there was a long period of abandonment after Morāsī III.

Present evidences indicate that Morāsī Ḡonday was a small Bronze Age agricultural village, dependent on cultivation of barley and raising of sheep, goats, and cattle.
