= Ibex =

Type of mammal

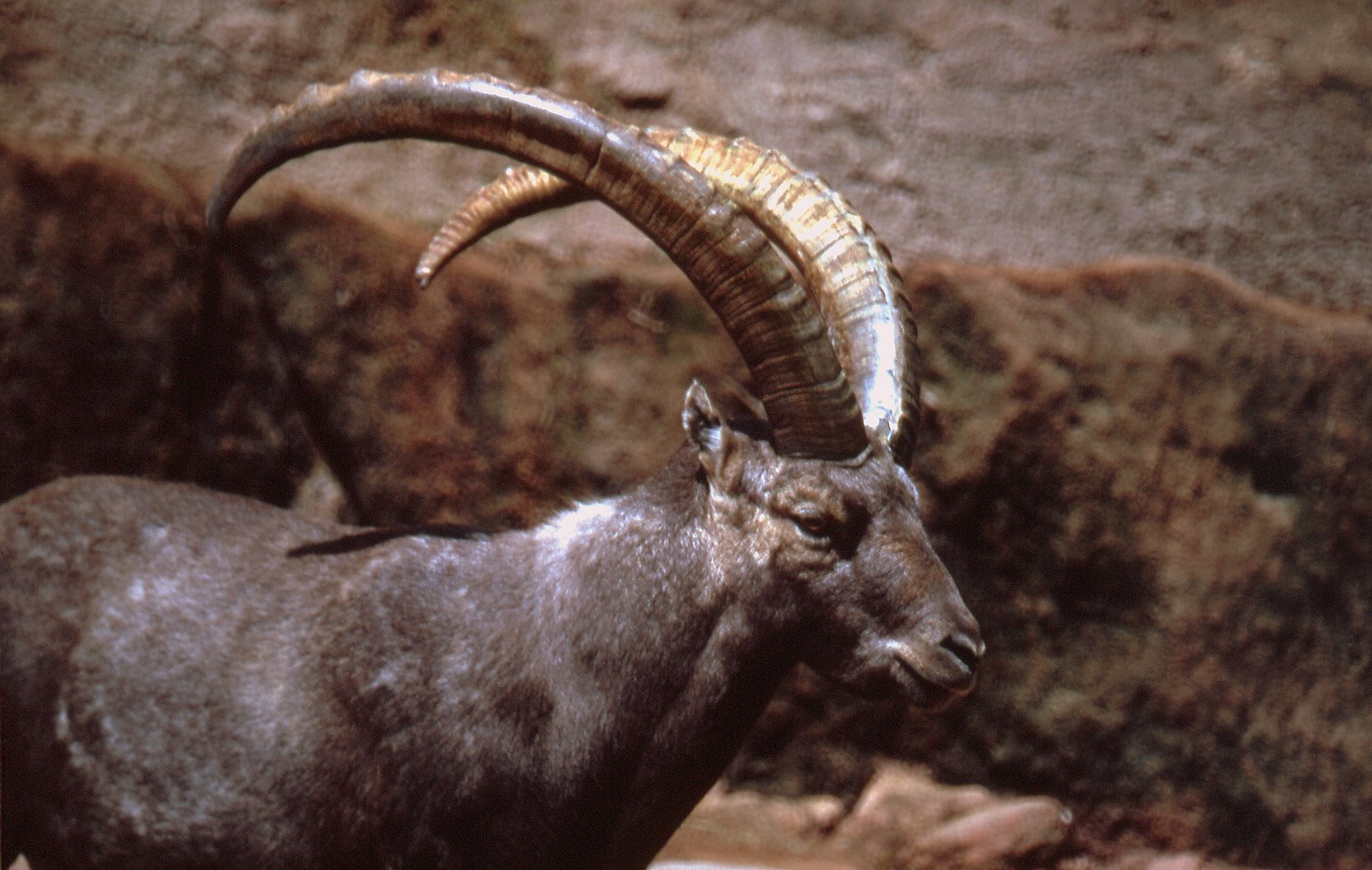
Male Alpine ibex

An ibex (/aɪbɛks/ pl.: ibex, ibexes or ibices), is any of several species of wild goat (genus Capra), distinguished by the male's large curved horns, which are transversely ridged in front. Ibex are found in Eurasia, North Africa and East Africa.

== Taxonomy ==
The name ibex comes from Latin, borrowed from Iberian or Aquitanian, akin to Old Spanish bezerro, 'bull', modern Spanish becerro, 'yearling'., ibex can live up to 20 years. Three closely related varieties of goats found in the wild are not usually called ibex: the markhor, western tur, and eastern tur.

A male ibex is referred to as a buck, a female is a doe, and young juveniles are called kids. An ibex buck is commonly larger and heavier than a doe. The buck ranges in height from 70 to 110 centimetres (27–43 in) and weighing 90 to 120 kilograms (200–270 lb), while the female ranges in height around 60 centimetres (24 in) and weighing around 30 to 50 kilograms (65 to 110 lb). The most noticeable difference between the sexes is the larger size of a buck's horns. The doe grows a pair of smaller, thinner horns which develop considerably more slowly than those of a buck. The ibex's horns appear at birth and continue to grow through the rest of its life.

== Known ibex ==
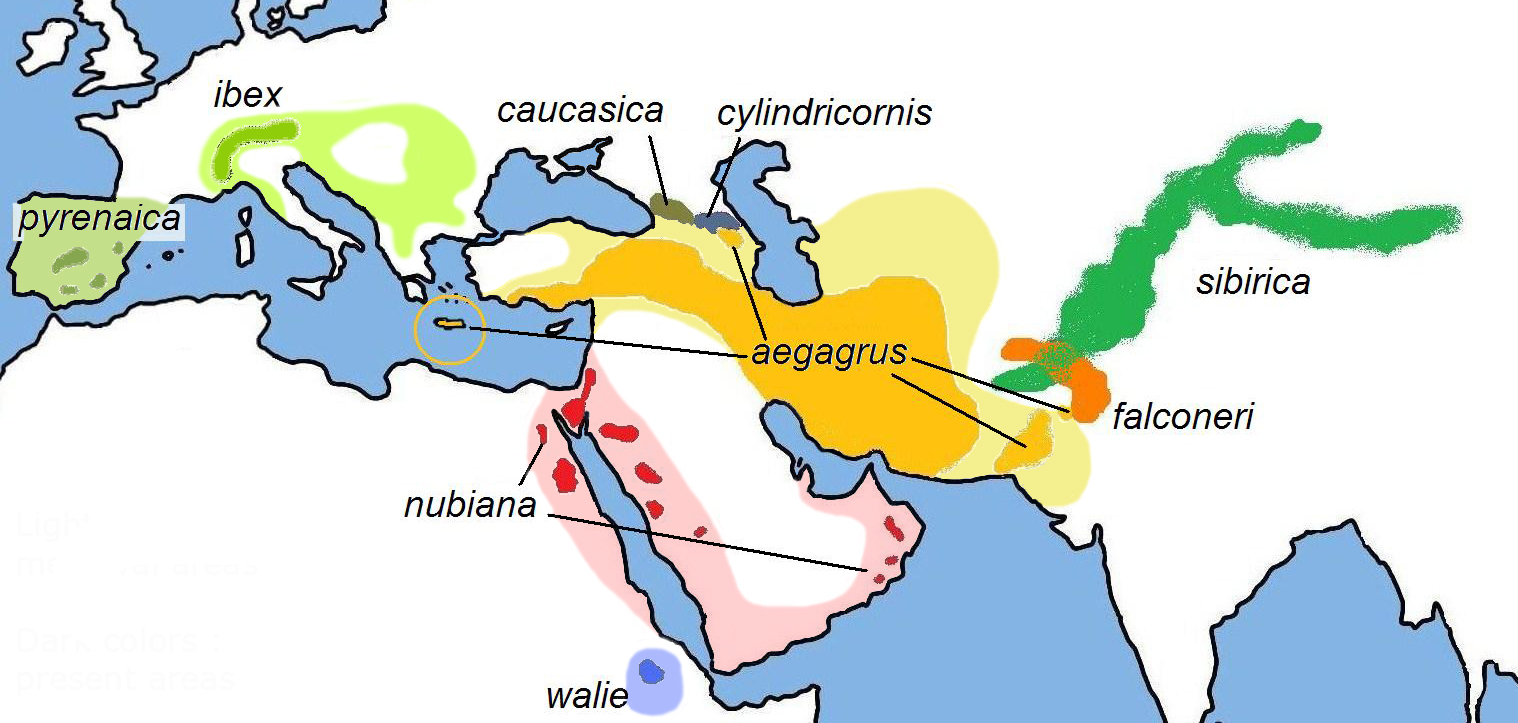
Ibex (Capra) distribution

Species of wild goats that are called ibex are:

- The Siberian ibex (Capra sibirica), also known as the Asian ibex, is a wild goat inhabiting long mountain systems in central Asian deserts and the northwestern Himalayas. The animal is 80–100 cm high at shoulder, and weighs an average 60 kg. The adult males have long pointed beards and scimitar-shaped horns with prominent ridges on the frontal surface. The coat is dark brown with greyish underparts, and a dorsal stripe runs from the neck to tail. Adult males also have grey saddle patches on their backs. The species exhibits sexual dimorphism, as the females are smaller with small straight horns that are widely separated at the base. Asiatic ibex is widely distributed over an area stretching from the Hindu Kush in Afghanistan to Sayan Mountains in Mongolia. The animals are found most frequently at elevations ranging from 3000 to 5300 m above sea level, but are also known to occur in areas as low as 1000 m in the Altai Mountains. They have a predilection for rugged terrain as an anti-predator strategy.
- The Alpine ibex (Capra ibex) is found in the European Alps. Alpine ibex are found in France, Bulgaria, Austria, Switzerland, Italy, Germany and Slovenia, and have been introduced to ranches in the United States, Canada and Argentina.
- The Iberian ibex (Capra pyrenaica), formerly called Spanish ibex, is restricted to mountainous enclaves of the Iberian Peninsula, in Spain, Portugal and the French Pyrenees, but in the past it also occurred in southern France. There are approximately 50,000 Iberian ibex living. Two subspecies have become extinct. One of those, the Pyrenean ibex, was cloned in 2003, but the resulting individual died very quickly.
- The Nubian ibex (Capra nubiana) inhabits the desert regions of the Middle East, as well as the Itbay region of Sudan and Egypt. They are the smallest ibex species and adapted for arid environments with a tan color, white underbelly and rump, black legs, and dark tail. This species is Vulnerable, with less than 4,500 individuals in the wild. The population is declining through most of its range.
- The Walia ibex (Capra walie) is found only in the Simien Mountains of the Ethiopian Highlands, where it was updated from critically endangered to endangered in 2008, and later updated to vulnerable in 2020. It is sometimes considered a subspecies of Alpine Ibex. The Ibex was also a national emblem of the Axumite Empire.
- The wild goat (Capra aegagrus), also known as West Asian ibex, is found in Turkey and the Caucasus in the west to Turkmenistan, Afghanistan and Pakistan in the east, and is the ancestor of the domestic goat.

== History ==
Evidence of the ibex is widely present in the archaeological record. The earliest known artifacts featuring the ibex are from the Harappan civilization and are rare. A seal from the Harappan region of Cholistan has been dated between 2500–2000 BCE. Twin Ibexes are seen under the seat of the 'Pashupati' figure on a seal from Mohenjodaro, ca. 2000–1900 BCE. An ibex also features in a composite seal along with other animals, described by Dr J. M. Kenoyer on page 194 of his 1998 book titled "Ancient Cities of the Indus Valley Civilization".

Ibex motifs are very common on cylinder seals and pottery, both painted and embossed, from the Near East and Mediterranean regions. Excavations from Minoan Crete at Knossos, for example, have yielded specimens from c. 1800 BCE, including one cylinder seal depicting an ibex defending himself from a hunting dog. From the similar age a gold jewelry ibex image was found at the Akrotiri archaeological site on Santorini in present day Greece. An Iron Age Capra ibex specimen was recovered at the Aq Kupruk Archaeological site in present day Afghanistan, illustrating either domestication or hunting of the ibex by these early peoples. However, archaeological records of ibex can be difficult to separate from those of domestic goats.

Earlier evidence of domestication or hunting of the ibex was found identified through DNA analysis of the contents of the stomach of Ötzi, the natural mummy of a Chalcolithic man discovered in the Ötztal Alps in 1991, who lived between 3400 and 3100 BCE. According to DNA reconstruction, the man's penultimate meal contained ibex.

In Yemen, the ibex is a longstanding symbol of national identity, representing many positive attributes of the Yemeni people. Numbers of the animal – primarily the Nubian ibex – declined significantly from the late 20th century, due to hunting. In 2022, activists and intellectuals urged the declaration of an annual National Ibex Day, on 22 January, along with calls for greater protection of the animal.

== Rescue from extinction ==
When firearms spread in the 15th century, the large population of ibex that spanned many of Europe's mountains decreased as they became easy targets for hunters. The ibex was often hunted for its meat, with other body parts used for medicine. The ibex horns were highly sought after as a remedy for impotence, while its blood was used for treating kidney stones.

The relentless hunting of the alpine ibex might have led to its extinction were it not for the foresight of the dukes of Savoy. Charles-Felix, Duke of Savoy and King of Sardinia, banned the hunting of the ibex across his estates of the Gran Paradiso after being persuaded by a report on the animal's endangered state. The ban was implemented on 12 September 1821 and its law was soon extended to the rest of the kingdom. In 1856, Victor Emmanuel II, succeeding Charles-Felix as the king, inducted the Gran Paradiso as a protected hunting estate along with appointed gamekeepers to patrol the area.
