= Darra-e Kur =

Cave and archaeological site in Afghanistan

- Bābā Darwīsh; Cave of the Valley; Darra-i-Kur
- location in Afghanistan Darra-e Kur (South Asia)
- 36°47′07.728″N 69°59′42.504″E
- Type: rock shelter
- Location: northeast of Kalafgān near the village of Chinār-i Gunjus Khān
- Region: Badakhshan province, Afghanistan

Site notes
- Excavation dates: 1966
- Archaeologists: Louis Dupree

Darra-e Kūr or Bābā Darwīsh, is an archaeological site in Badakhshan province in Afghanistan. It is situated just northeast of Kalafgān near the village of Chinār-i Gunjus Khān 63 km (39.1 mi) east of Taloqan, on the road to Faizabad. The cave is situated atop the side of the valley near the hamlet of Bābā Darwīsh.

== Description ==
Darra-e Kūr is a rock shelter, well-stratified in silt deposits, laid down by a stream. Approximately 800 stone implements were recovered, of two basic types: flint and sickle blades, and large diabase points. Other finds included celts, scrapers, pounders, blades, simple jewelry, fauna, such as fish, rodents, wild horse, domesticated sheep and goat and onager, a fragment of a human right temporal bone, many bone fossils and three fragments of tin and bronze. Unearthed pottery was mostly crude, black wares, sometimes decorated. The only architectural traces found were 80 post-holes, suggestive of tents. Three articulated goat burials were discovered.

Collection:

- AMNH and Kabul Museum - excavated material.

Field-work:

- 1966 Louis Dupree, AMNH - excavations.

== Dating ==
The Mousterian artefacts come from a layer that was dated to around 30,000 BP. One of the younger layers above, referred to by the site archaeologists as coming from a "Goat Cult" Neolithic layer, was dated to around 3780 BP.

Direct AMS dating of the temporal bone (NMNH 387961) reveals that the bone is a lot younger than previously thought, giving an age range of around 4530-4410 BP. Previously thought to have been from the Paleolithic, due to the presence of the bone among the layer containing Mousterian Levallois artefacts, direct dating has revealed that the bone is actually from the Neolithic. Researchers now believe that the temporal bone came from a later burial that intruded into the Mousterian layer, likely coming from the culture associated with the "Goat Cult" Neolithic layer.

== Archaeogenetics ==
In 2017, researchers successfully extracted the DNA from both the petrous and squamous part of the Darra-e Kur temporal bone. The Darra-e Kur specimen is the first ancient human remain from Afghanistan from which DNA has been successfully sequenced. The individual was found to belong to Haplogroup H2a.
