= Aq Kupruk =

- Location in Afghanistan
- Coordinates: 36°5′0″N 66°50′0″E
- Country: Afghanistan
- Province: Balkh Province
- Time zone: + 4.30

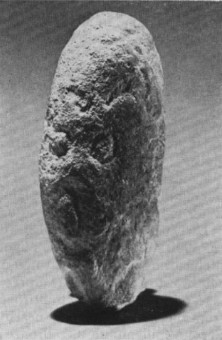
Sculpted head from Aq Kupruk, northern Afghanistan, circa 20,000 BC - the earliest representation of a human face yet discovered in Afghanistan.

Aq Kupruk is a village in Balkh Province in northern Afghanistan.

== Archaeological sites ==
Aq Kupruk(an Uzbek word meaning "white bridge")is also an archaeological site consisting of four sites, numbered I, II, III and IV.

- Aq Kupruk I, or Ghar-i Asb, is a rock shelter of the Kushan-Sasanian period, containing some fragmentary Buddhist frescos and some simple architecture.
- Aq Kupruk II, or Ghār-i Mār, is another rock shelter, probably the most productive of the three sites, producing material from all periods except the Kushan-Sasanian. About 10% of the occupation area was excavated.
- Aq Kupruk III, is an open-air site on the river terrace consisting of two periods, both in the Epipalaeolithic.
- Aq Kupruk IV, was excavated briefly by McBurney nearer to the village, producing a "Middle Mousterian" type of industry differing from that found by Dupree.

Finds included an extensive and sophisticated stone tool industry, very early stone sculpture, domesticated sheep and goat remains, fragments of beaten copper from the ceramic Neolithic, many projectile points, terracotta and simple jewellery.

Collections:

1. AMNH - excavated material.
2. BIAS - flint and stone.
3. Kabul Museum - excavated material, stone head.

Field-work:

1. 1959 Dupree, American Universities Field Staff - survey.
2. 1960 Hayashi & Sahara, Kyoto University - survey.
3. 1962 & 65 Dupree, AMNH - excavations.
4. 1971 McBurney, Cambridge University - sondage.

== See also ==
- Balkh Province
