= Pre-Islamic scripts in Afghanistan =

Scripts used in Afghanistan before their displacement by the Arabic alphabet

Afghanistan possesses a rich linguistic legacy of pre-Islamic scripts, which existed before being displaced by the Arabic alphabet, after the Islamic conquest of Afghanistan. Among these scripts are Sharada, Kharosthi, Greek (for the Bactrian language), and Brāhmī. For thousands of years, Afghanistan was inhabited by Indo-Aryan and Iranian peoples and thus all ancient documents, tracts, monuments and remains are of Hindu and Iranian origins. Later, Buddhism became the major force in Afghanistan and brought with it its own liturgical languages.

Abundant archeological evidence in the form of inscriptions, numismatics and manuscripts has provided traces of the precursors of the contemporary Indo-Aryan Languages of Afghanistan such as Dardic languages. Afghan manuscripts in pre-Islamic Indic scripts are included in the Red List of Afghanistan Antiquities at Risk of illicit traffic and looting.

== Brahmi script ==
Recent Archeological unearthings of Sanskrit in Brahmi script inscriptions attest to the prevalence of the Sanskrit in Afghanistan.

Some later Sanskrit inscriptions in late Brahmi of about around the fifth to eighth centuries have also been found in Afghanistan in recent decades. Worthy of note are the Dilberjin fresco inscriptions (Drevniaia Baktriia); the Gardez inscriptions on an image of Ganesa; and the Uma Maheshvara image inscriptions from Tapa Skandar. Several Buddhist inscriptions of this period with the Buddhist creed on votive clay tablets have also been discovered at Ghazni.

The Kushan Empire employed Sanskrit abundantly for use in Hindu and Buddhist literary texts, as is evident from epigraphic evidence.

The presence of Buddhist literary texts in Sanskrit of the Kushan period goes hand in hand with the codification of the Sanskrit canon of the Sarvastivada school in Kashmir at the Buddhist council in the time of Kanishka.

Historians attest the largest population of the region including Bactria spoke vernacular dialects of Sanskrit.

== Śāradā script ==
Śāradā texts have been widely found in Afghanistan; one of them was engraved on a marble statue of the Hindu elephant god Ganesh that was found near Gardez. Another was inscribed on the large Uma Maheshvara from Tepe Skandar, north of Kabul. The Śāradā inscriptions all seem to date to the 8th century CE.

Between 750 and 1000 A.D., the Shahi's issued silver coins to provide currency for eastern Afghanistan and Gandhara. Most of the coins have an obverse legend in either Spalpati Deva or Samanta Deva, which are Śāradā scripts.

== Kharosthi script ==
Inscriptions and documents in Kharosthi have been found over a broad area in Afghanistan. To the far west and northwest, several specimens have been found at sites along the Kabul River in Afghanistan as far west as Wardak or Khawat, some 20 miles west of Kabul. Recent archaeological excavations have also yielded numerous Kharosthi inscriptions from north of the Hindu Kush, in ancient Bactria, both in sites in northern Afghanistan such as Qunduz and in several places in the former Soviet republics of Uzbekistan and Tajikistan.

== See also ==
- Kushan script
- Gandhāran Buddhist texts
- Kandahar Greek Inscription
- Kandahar Bilingual Rock Inscription
- Milinda Panha
- Rhinoceros Sutra
- Pre-Islamic Hindu and Buddhist heritage of Afghanistan
