= Guldara stupa =

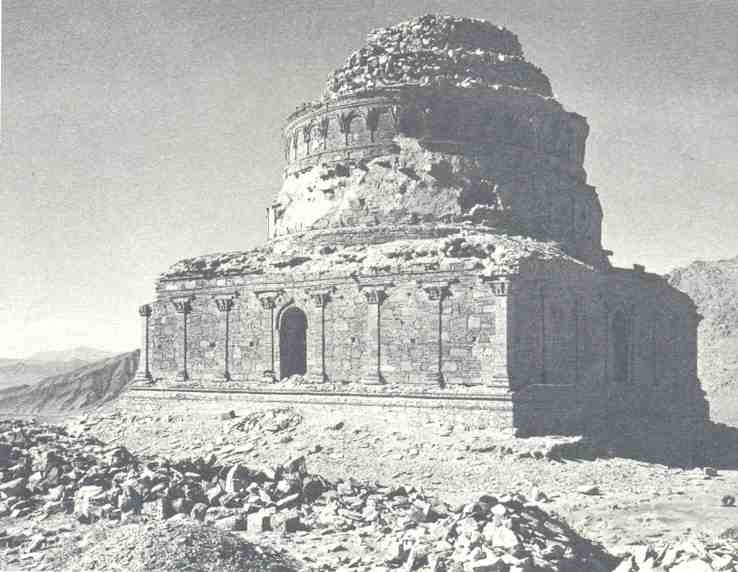

- Location in Afghanistan
- Coordinates: 34°23′32″N 69°16′43″E
- Country: Afghanistan
- Province: Kabul Province
- Time zone: UTC+4:30

The Guldara stupa is not far from the village of Guldara (or Gol Darreh) in, Kabul Province, Afghanistan, set on the summit of a high hill at the end of the Valley of Guldara ('Valley of Flowers'). It appears to have been established in the late 2nd century CE, as it contained six gold coins of the Kushan king Vima Kadphises ruled c. 113-127 CE, the father of Kanishka I, and two from Huvishka, Kanishka's son, who is thought to have ruled c. 150-190 CE. None of the coins appear very worn, and the two Huvishka coins look to be in almost mint condition.

== Description ==
The Guldara stupa is about 22 km or 14 miles south of the city of Kabul. It is a large stupa, a solid mass made of rough stone and mud and is probably the best-preserved in Afghanistan. A small stupa, a replica of the main one, is set on the side of the hill and, nearby, are the remnants of a fortified monastery. Facing the monastery "was a group of very large standing figures" of which the excavators only found two large feet which have since disappeared. Close to the village of Shiwaki nearby is another monastery and stupa.

The stupa itself stands on a square base with two cylindrical domes topped with a dome above it.

"The base is decorated with false Corinthian columns flanking, on three sides, a central niche, and on the southwest side, a staircase leading to the top of the base. Statues once occupied the niches. The decoration of the first drum is similar to that of the base but the second drum is more elaborately embellished with a false arcade of alternating semicircular and trapezoidal arches. The motif between the arches represents the umbrella mast with which stupas are usually crowned. The walls present a fine example of Kushan workmanship known as "diaper masonry", consisting of thin neatly placed layers of schist interspersed with large blocks of stone. The construction of the capitals is also especially interesting and most effective in its simplicity. The entire stupa was originally plastered and painted ochre-yellow with red designs."

"In a valley called Guldara, or the vale of flowers, on the opposite side of this ridge, is a tope which was also examined by M. Honigberger. As he had penetrated only the basement, I directed it to be re-opened at the line where the superstructure reposes on it. My search was successful, and at the centre were discovered in an apartment mingled with ashes, gold medals of Kadphises, and of the earlier princes of the Kanerki family, which it was interesting to meet with in company with each other, and numerous ornaments of gold, apparently buttons, resembling such articles even to being provided with shanks."

== Reliquary and contents ==
Between a half and three-quarters of the way up the stupa there was a small chamber containing a reliquary and some treasure. The 19th century British adventurer Charles Masson opened the chamber and recovered eight gold Kushan coins some other gold ornaments. As well as the gold coins mentioned above there were also ninety-six gold buttons with bronze loops with an average diameter of 2.1 cm., and "a small quantity of ashes and fragments of bones".
