= Nancy Dupree =

American historian (1927–2017)

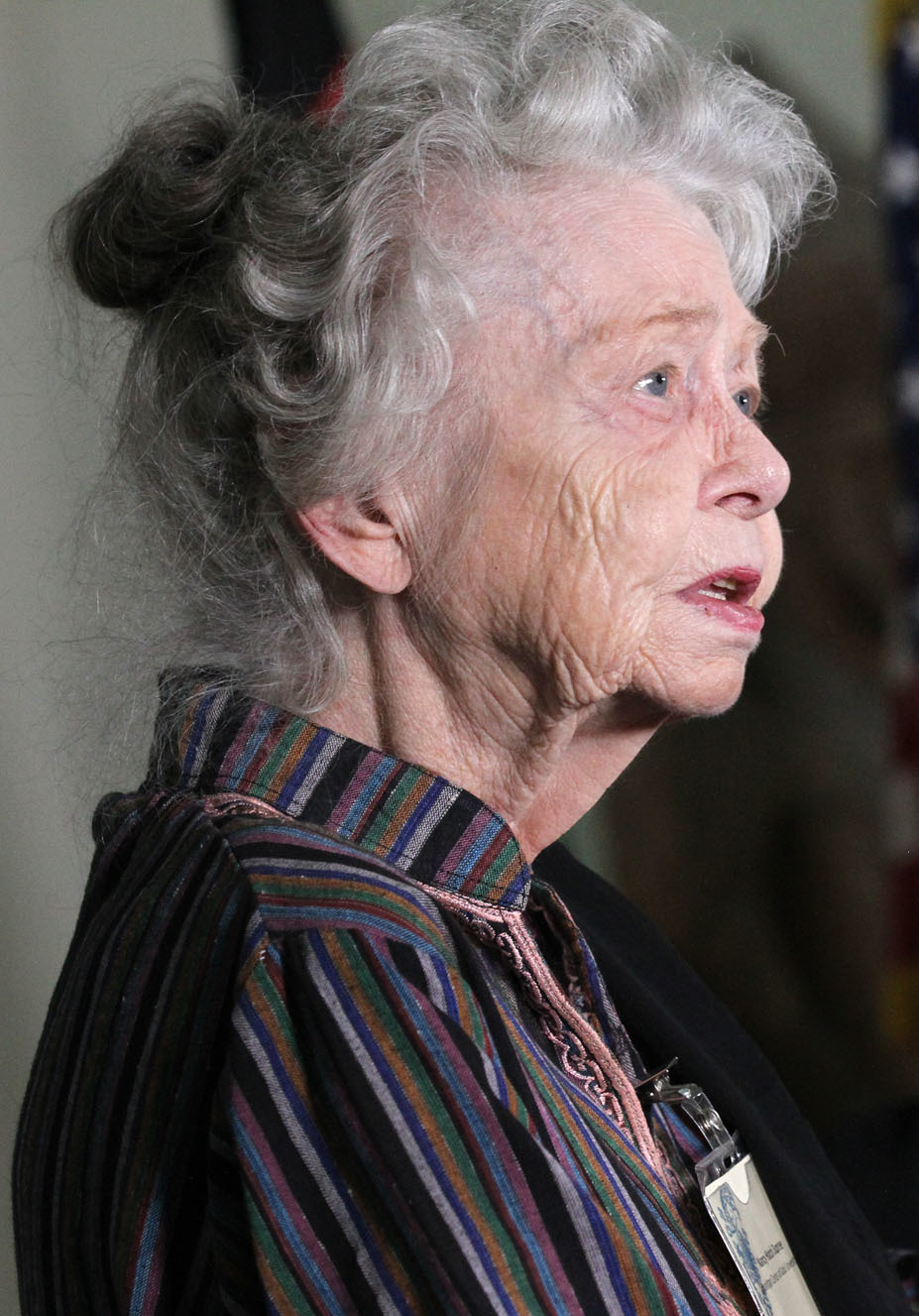
- Dupree giving a speech during the International Architectural Ideas Competition at the National Museum of Afghanistan in September 2012 in Kabul, Afghanistan
- Born: Nancy Hatch; October 3, 1927; Cooperstown, New York, United States
- Died: September 10, 2017 (aged 89); Kabul, Afghanistan
- Resting place: Kabul, Afghanistan
- Education: Barnard College (B.A.); Columbia University (M.A.)
- Occupation: Administrator
- Title: Director of the Afghanistan Center at Kabul University
- Successor: Position vacant
- Spouses: Alan D. Wolfe (divorced) Louis Dupree (m. 1966; died 1989)

Nancy Hatch Dupree (Pashto: نانسي دوپري, romanized: Nansi dupri; October 3, 1927 – September 10, 2017) was an American historian whose work primarily focused on the history of modern Afghanistan. She was the director of the Afghanistan Center at Kabul University and author of five books that she compiled while studying the history of Afghanistan from 1962 until the late 1970s, writing about tourism and history of Bamyan, Kabul, Kandahar, Herat, Mazar-i-Sharif and so on. She was fondly called the "grandmother of Afghanistan", having spent much of her life there or with Afghans abroad.

== Early life and education ==
Nancy Dupree was born as Nancy Hatch in Cooperstown, New York. She spent most of her childhood in India, then under the British Raj. Her parents were working in Kerala, where her father was an adviser to the Maharaja of Travancore. Her mother, a Broadway actress, was drawn to Indian art and theatrical dance forms and embarked on the first PhD on Kathakali in the British Raj by a foreign scholar.

Hatch graduated from Barnard College in 1949. She then went to Columbia University to study Chinese. She did her master's in Chinese Art at Columbia University, but her life was linked to southern Asia in an inexorable manner.

== Career ==
First married to an American intelligence officer, Alan D. Wolfe, posted in Ceylon (present day Sri Lanka), she later moved with her husband to the First Iraqi Republic, then Pakistan, and finally the Kingdom of Afghanistan in 1962.

Dupree first arrived in Afghanistan in 1962 as a diplomat's wife. Shortly after she wrote the first guide in English to the Bamiyan Buddhas. Several years later, she met Louis Duprée, who was a renowned archaeologist and scholar of Afghan culture and history. The two fell in love and got married after divorcing their former spouses, marrying in the Bagh-e Bala Palace in 1966.

After the Soviet invasion of Afghanistan in 1979, Nancy was forced to leave the country, while Louis remained. Rather than return to the United States, she moved to a refugee camp in Peshawar, Pakistan. Louis was eventually arrested under suspicion of working for the Central Intelligence Agency as a spy. He then joined Nancy in Peshawar. While in the refugee camp, Nancy realized the potential for the loss of unique documents about Afghanistan to be lost or destroyed forever. In order to preserve these works and to teach them to a new generation, she and Louis formed the Agency Coordinating Body for Afghan Relief (ACBAR). They began to collect both government and non-government documents that related to the country's history, culture, the Soviet-Afghan War, the Mujahedeen, and the Taliban. Nancy said that in the looting that began after the Soviet invasion, many priceless books were sold to be used for fuel. A large number of books were also sold by weight to be used to wrap food. According to The Economist, "her networking prowess was so notorious that she was once approached, to see if she could help with permits to dig tunnels in Kabul, by the young Osama bin Laden." Louis died in North Carolina in 1989, a short time after Soviet forces completed their withdrawal from Afghanistan.

After the Coalition forces moved into Afghanistan in 2001, Nancy did not immediately move back. She and her colleagues were concerned for their own safety and that of ACBAR's collection, which by 1999 consisted of 7,739 titles written in Pashto, Dari (Persian), French, German, Norwegian, and Swedish. In 2005, Nancy moved back to Kabul and worked with the Afghan government to find a place to house ACBAR's collection. The collection was moved to Kabul University and the name was changed to the Afghan Center at Kabul University (ACKU). A $2 million building of where ACKU is located was completed to house the collection in 2012.

Part of ACKU's collections have been digitized in collaboration with the University of Arizona Libraries and are available online for global open access. When University of Arizona Librarian Atifa Rawan knew Nancy personally and her collections moved back to Kabul from Pershaw, Pakistan in 2005 by the invitation from Afghanistan's President Hamid Karzai. In 2006, Atifa Rawan and Yan Han met with Nancy to submit a grant proposal of digitizing all ACKU's collections for two major purposes: 1) universal open access and 2) digital preservation. In 2007, a NEH grant of $300,000 was funded to digitize 3,000 titles of ACKU's collection for open access and digital preservation. Nancy selected these 3,000 titles from ACKU's collection. The grant project ended in 2011, and provided a great start for open access and digital preservation of related Afghan materials. Since 2011, more than 1.4 million pages of documents have been added. The Afghan Digital Repository is the world largest digital collections related to Afghanistan and its related regions, consisting of over 1.7 million pages of documents in Pashto, Persian and English.

Dupree divided her time between Afghanistan and her other home in North Carolina.

== Death ==
Dupree died after battling an unspecified illness in Kabul, Afghanistan, at the age of 89. President Ashraf Ghani and Chief Executive Abdullah Abdullah offered their condolences. Ghani added that Nancy "considered Afghanistan her real home and willed to be buried in Kabul next to the tomb of her husband." A large mural of Dupree was painted on a wall in downtown Kabul in honor.

== Bibliography ==
- Dupree, Nancy Hatch; Kohzad, Ahmad Ali (1972). An Historical Guide to Kabul. Afghan Tourist Organization. ASIN B0006CCCLW.
- Dupree, Nancy Hatch; Dupree, Motamedi (1974). The National Museum of Afghanistan : an illustrated guide. The Afghan Tourist Organization. ASIN B000YZI8FK.
- Dupree, Nancy Hatch (1977). An Historical Guide to Afghanistan. Afghan Tourist Organization. ASIN B0006DXU30.
