= Said Qala Tepe =

Archaeological site in Kandahar, Afghanistan

- Cultures: Helmand culture
- Location: Near Kandahar, Afghanistan

Site notes
- Height: 8 m (26 ft)
- Area: 200 by 200 meters
- Excavation dates: 1970s, Jim G. Shaffer

Said Qala Tepe is an archaeological site near Kandahar in Afghanistan. The tell is about 8 meters (26 ft) high and 200 by 200 meters (660 ft × 660 ft) in area. It has produced particularly strong evidence for the prehistoric period, showing an intensive settlement of the site in the fourth and third millennium BC, attributed to the Helmand culture.

== Context ==
In the same area of the Kandahar Plain, the contemporary site of Deh Morasi Ghundai is located.

"Stylistically the finds from Deh Morasi and Said Qala tie in with those of pre-Indus Valley sites and with those of comparable age on the Iranian Plateau and in Central Asia, indicating cultural contacts during this very early age."

Deh Morasi Ghundai is situated about 16 km to the south-west of Said Qala, and it is about half its size. Deh Morasi is somewhat later than Said Qala.

== Excavations ==
Limited excavations were carried out at the site in the 1970s by Jim G. Shaffer, who uncovered two 10-meter squares and a 6 by 2-meter area. During the excavation, six layers were observed. One of the layers was a cemetery that dates to the Kushan–Sassanid period.

Four prehistoric occupations were identified at Said Qala, all of them being contemporary with Mundigak levels III 5 to IV 1.

To periods II and III belong an adobe wall of an unknown function that consists of a 3-meter-wide foundation with two additional walls filled with clay between them. In addition, various houses were excavated that only contain one room.

== Ceramics ==
The pottery found at Said Qala Tepe is similar to that from Mundigak, about 96 km away. It is generally handmade, but some pieces were made on a potter's wheel.

The surface of the ceramics is mostly smoothed, but some also have fragments on their surface with pressed-in basket patterns. There are painted ceramics in the Nal style, and also those similar to the related Amri culture in the Indus valley. Painted ceramics never made up more than about 10% of the total ceramic volume.

Found in the village were stone tools, bone artefacts, fragments of stone vessels, weaving spindles, beads made of different materials, and various bronze objects. In addition to this, some seals with geometric motifs, cattle and human figures made of clay, have been found in the town.

== Chronology ==
The chronological classification of the finds is problematic. Three C-14 surveys were carried out, but they provided the oldest data for the youngest layers, possibly due to groundwater contamination. The chronological integration of the finds was accordingly based on comparisons with other sites, especially with the ceramics from Mundigak. Layers of Said Qala Tepe I-IV mostly correspond to the ceramics of the Mundigak III-IV layers, which are from 2400 to 3500 BC.

As Deh Morasi is later than Said Qala, it represents a Mundigak IV type occupation.

== Literature ==
- Cameron A. Petrie and Jim G. Schaffer, in: Raymond Allchin, Warwick Ball, Norman Hammond (Eds.): The Archeology of Afghanistan, From earliest Times to the Timurid Period, Edinburgh, University Press, Edinburgh 2019, 224 -237
