= Louis Dupree (professor) =

American archaeologist and scholar of Afghanistan

- Born: August 23, 1925; Greenville, North Carolina
- Died: March 21, 1989 (aged 63); Durham, North Carolina
- Occupation: Professor
- Spouse: Nancy Dupree (1966–1989; his death)

Academic background
- Education: Harvard University

Academic work
- Discipline: Archaeology and anthropology
- Sub-discipline: Afghan culture and history
- Notable works: Afghanistan
- Website: Professor Louis Duprée

Louis Dupree (August 23, 1925 – March 21, 1989) was an American archaeologist, anthropologist, and scholar of Afghan culture and history. He was the husband of Nancy Hatch Dupree, who was the Board Director of the Afghanistan Center at Kabul University in Afghanistan and the author of five books about Afghanistan. The husband and wife team from the United States worked together for 15 years in Kabul, collecting as many works written about Afghanistan as they could. They travelled across the country from 1962 until the 1979 Soviet intervention, conducting archaeological excavations.

== Early life and careers ==
Dupree was born on August 23, 1925, in Greenville, North Carolina. He left Greenville High School around 1943 without graduating to serve in World War II, where he joined the United States Merchant Marine and was stationed in the Philippines. At the end of the war, he decided to transfer to the 11th Airborne Division of the United States Army. When World War II ended, he began Asian archeology and ethnology studies at Harvard University. After receiving his B.A., M.A., and PhD degrees, he planned to re-visit the Philippines for research purposes but was rejected by its government. Instead, he was invited to join an archeological survey in Afghanistan in 1949. This led to his lifelong interest in southwestern Asia, from 1959 to 1983.

Dupree taught at the following universities:

- Air University at Maxwell Air Force Base
- Pennsylvania State University (Penn State)
- Princeton University in New Jersey
- United States Military Academy at West Point, New York
- University of North Carolina at Chapel Hill
- Duke University in Durham, North Carolina

During his career, Dupree also served as an adviser to several governments, including those of West Germany, France, Denmark, Sweden, and Great Britain. He consulted with the United States Department of State and the United Nations. As an affiliate of the American Universities Field Staff (AUFS), he was their expert on Afghanistan and Pakistan.

He and his wife were often seen driving in a four-wheel-drive Land Rover truck in Afghan cities. After the April 1978 Saur Revolution in Afghanistan, Dupree was arrested and deported from the country. He moved back to the United States but often visited neighboring Pakistan to monitor the Soviet–Afghan War. He has worked with the mujahideen forces who were fighting the Soviet-backed government of Afghanistan. He spent time in Peshawar, Pakistan, assisting Afghan refugees along with his wife. He had previously stayed in Pakistan as a Fulbright Scholar and as an advisor on Afghan affairs to the US ambassador in Pakistan.

For over fifty years, husband and wife Dr. Louis and Nancy Dupree photographed the changing times of Afghanistan. From the 1950s to the 2000s, the Duprees photographed Afghanistan through the peak of the cold war as well as documented cultural heritage, architecture, landscape and art. Funded by the Modern Endangered Archives Program at the UCLA Library, the Afghanistan Center at Kabul University digitized over 5000 images from the Dupree's collection. This collection is available digitally through the UCLA library.

=== Death ===
Dupree died of lung cancer on March 21, 1989, at Duke University Hospital in Durham, North Carolina, just a month after the last Soviet troops withdrew from Afghanistan.

== Books ==
- Afghanistan (1973)
- An Historical Guide to Afghanistan (1972)
- An Historical Guide to Kabul
- A Guide to the National Museum
- Red Flag Over Hindu Kush: Leftist movements in Afghanistan (1979)
