= Kushan Empire =

30–375 CE empire in Central and South Asia

Kushan Empire Κοϸανο (Bactrian)
- 30–375
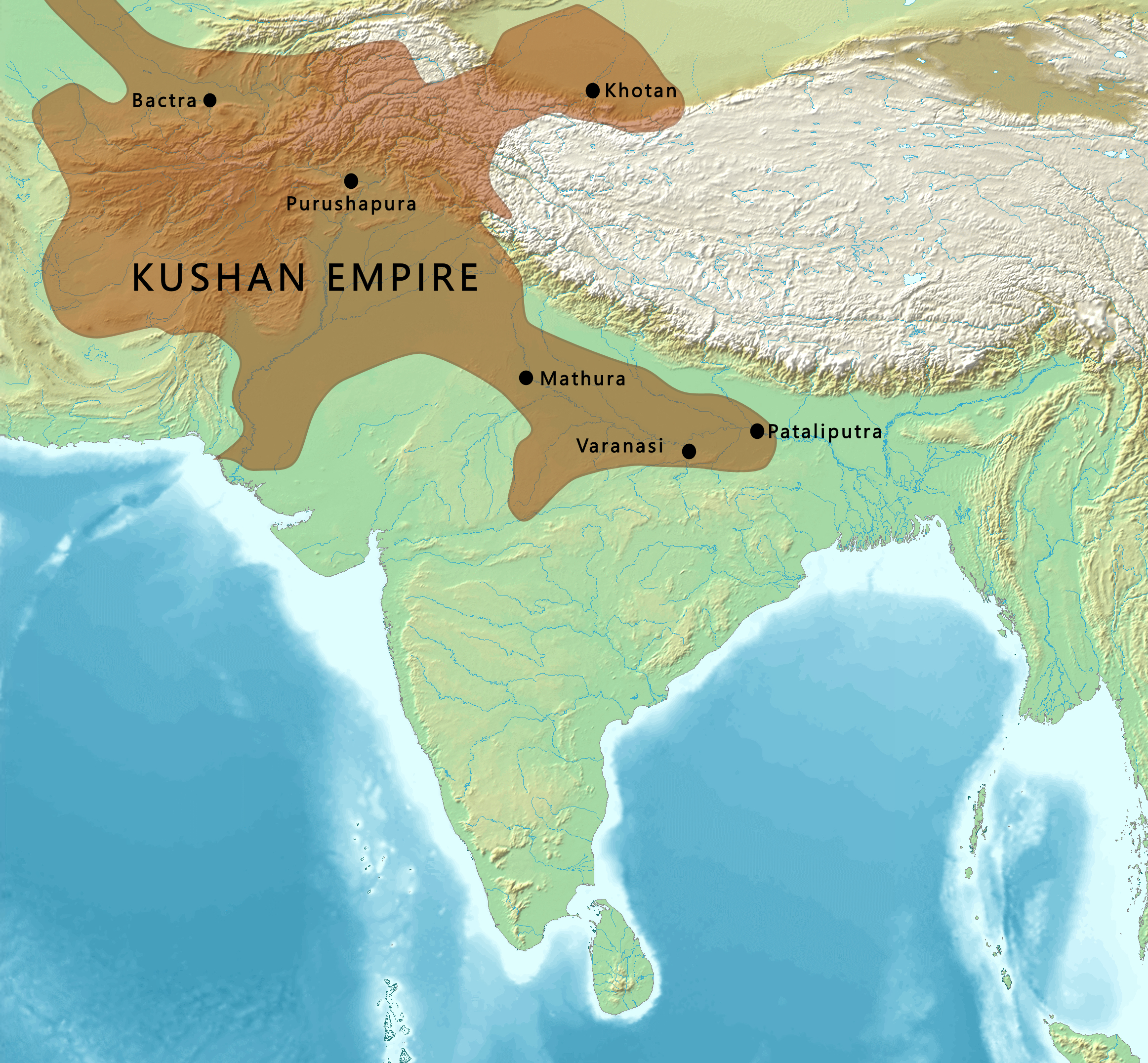
- A map of India in the 2nd century AD showing the extent of the Kushan Empire during the reign of Kanishka. Most historians consider the empire to have variously extended as far east as the middle Ganges plain, to Varanasi in the eastern Gangetic plain, or probably even Pataliputra.
- Capital: 1st Century BCE: Kapisa/Pushkalavati; from 1st century CE: Purushapura/Mathura; 3rd and 4th centuries CE: Taxila
- Common languages: Greek (official until c. 127) (Note: The Kushans at first retained the Greek language for administrative purposes but soon began to use Bactrian. The Bactrian Rabatak inscription (discovered in 1993 and deciphered in 2000) records that the Kushan king Kanishka the Great (c. 127 AD), discarded Greek (Ionian) as the language of administration and adopted Bactrian ("Arya language").); Bactrian (official from c. 127) (Note: The Pali word vaṃśa (dynasty) affixed to Gushana (Kushana), i.e. Gushana-vaṃśa (Kushan dynasty) appears on a dedicatory inscription at Manikiala stupa.); Gandhari Prakrit; Hybrid Sanskrit
- Religion: Hinduism; Buddhism; Zoroastrianism
- Demonym: Kushanas (Yuezhi)
- Government: Monarchy
- Emperor
  - 25–85: Kujula Kadphises (first)
  - 350–375: Kipunada (last)
- Historical era: Classical antiquity
  - Kujula Kadphises unites Yuezhi tribes into a confederation: 30
  - Subjugated by the Sasanians, Guptas, and Hepthalites: 375

Area
- 200 (low-end estimate of peak area): 2,000,000 km^{2} (770,000 sq mi)
- 200 (high-end estimate of peak area): 2,500,000 km^{2} (970,000 sq mi)
- Currency: Kushan dinara
Preceded by
Indo-Greek Kingdom
Indo-Parthian Kingdom
Indo-Scythians
Northern Satraps
Western Satraps
Maha-meghavahanas
Succeeded by
Sasanian Empire
Kushano-Sasanian Kingdom
Nagas of Padmavati
Kidarites
Nagas of Vindhyatabi
Gupta Empire

The Kushan Empire (c. 30–c. 375 CE) (Note: Ancient Greek: Βασιλεία Κοσσανῶν, Basileia Kossanōn; Bactrian: Κοϸανο, Košano; Gandhārī: 𐨑𐨂𐨮𐨀𐨞 (Kharoṣṭhī), Khuṣaṇa; Sanskrit: 𑀓𑀼𑀱𑀸𑀡 (Brāhmī), Kuṣāṇa; BHS: Guṣāṇa Vaṃśa; Parthian: 𐭊𐭅𐭔𐭍 𐭇𐭔𐭕𐭓, Kušan Xšaθr; Chinese: 貴霜; pinyin: Guìshuāng) was a syncretic empire formed by the Yuezhi in the early 1st century CE. Initially based in the Bactrian territories, it spread to encompass much of what is now Afghanistan, India, Pakistan, Tajikistan, Turkmenistan and Uzbekistan. Kushan territory in India extended at least as far as Saketa and Sarnath near Varanasi, where inscriptions have been found dating to the era of the Kushan emperor Kanishka the Great. (Note: It began about 127 CE.)

The Kushans were most probably one of five branches of the Yuezhi confederation, an Indo-European nomadic people of possible Tocharian origin, who migrated from northwestern China (Xinjiang and Gansu) and settled in ancient Bactria. The founder of the dynasty, Kujula Kadphises, followed Iranian and Greek cultural ideas and iconography after the Greco-Bactrian tradition. Kujula was also a follower of the Shaivite sect of Hinduism, as were two later Kushan kings Vima Kadphises and Vasudeva II. The Kushans in general were also great patrons of Buddhism, and, starting with emperor Kanishka, they employed elements of Zoroastrianism in their pantheon. They played an important role in the spread of Buddhism to Central Asia and China, ushering in a period of relative peace for 200 years, sometimes described as "Pax Kushana".

The Kushans initially used the Greek language for administrative purposes but soon began to use the Eastern Iranian Bactrian language. Kanishka sent his armies north of the Karakoram mountains. A direct road from Gandhara to China remained under Kushan control for more than a century, encouraged travel across the Karakoram, and facilitated the spread of Mahayana Buddhism to China. The Kushan dynasty had diplomatic contacts with the Roman Empire, Sasanian Persia, the Aksumite Empire, and the Han dynasty of China. It was at the center of trade relations between the Roman Empire and China: according to Alain Daniélou, "for a time, the Kushana Empire was the centerpoint of the major civilizations". While much philosophy, art, and science was created within its borders, the only textual record of the empire's history today comes from inscriptions and accounts in other languages, particularly Chinese.

The Kushan Empire fragmented into semi-independent kingdoms in the 3rd century AD, which fell to the Sasanians invading from the west and establishing the Kushano-Sasanian Kingdom in the areas of Sogdiana, Bactria, and Gandhara. In the 4th century, the Guptas, another Indian dynasty, also pressed from the east. The last of the Kushan and Kushano-Sasanian kingdoms were eventually overwhelmed by invaders from the north, known as the Kidarites, and later the Hephthalites.

== Origins ==
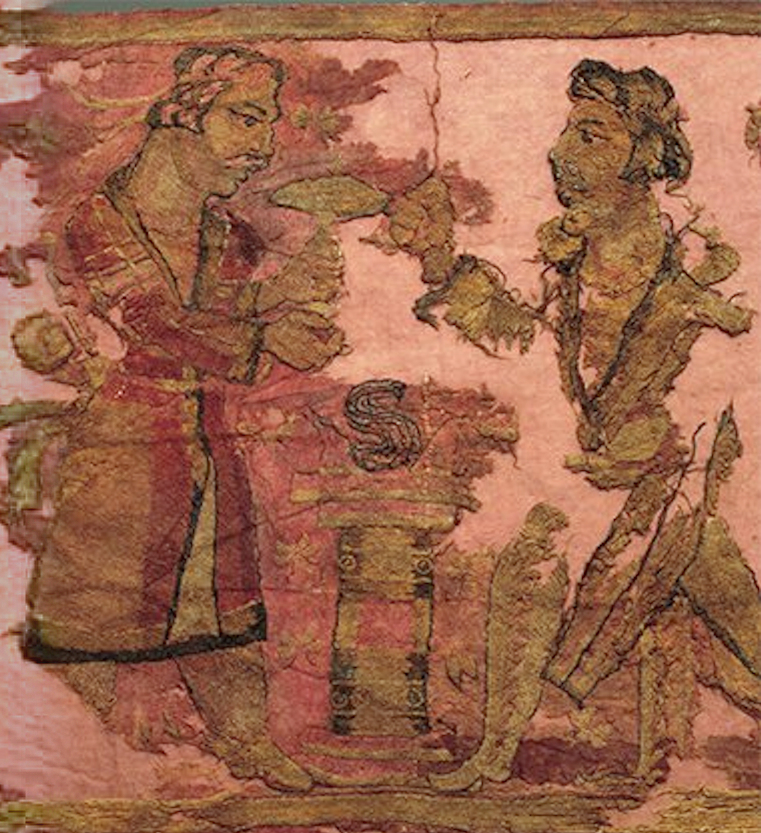
Yuezhi nobleman and priest over a fire altar. Noin-Ula.

Chinese sources describe the Guìshuāng (貴霜, Old Chinese: *kuj-s [s]raŋ), i.e. the Kushans, as one of the five aristocratic tribes of the Yuezhi. Many scholars believe that the Yuezhi were a people of Indo-European origin. A number of scholars have suggested a specifically Tocharian origin of the Yuezhi. An Iranic Saka origin has also been suggested by some scholars.

The Yuezhi were described in the Records of the Great Historian and the Book of Han as living in the grasslands of eastern Xinjiang and northwestern part of Gansu, in the northwest of modern-day China, until their King was beheaded by the Xiongnu (匈奴) who were also at war with China, which eventually forced them to migrate west in 176–160 BC. The five tribes constituting the Yuezhi are known in Chinese history as Xiūmì (休密), Guìshuāng (貴霜), Shuāngmǐ (雙靡), Xìdùn (肸頓), and Dūmì (都密).

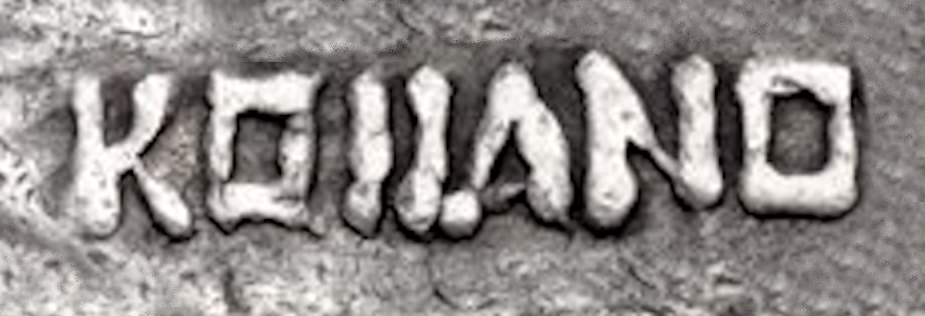
The ethnonym "KOϷϷANO" (Koshshano, "Kushan") in Greek alphabet (with the addition of the letter Ϸ, "Sh") on a coin of the first known Kushan ruler Heraios (1st century AD).

The Yuezhi reached the Hellenic kingdom of Greco-Bactria (in northern Afghanistan and Uzbekistan) around 135 BC. Under the pressure of Yuezhi and the Scythians who were in turn displaced by them, the Greek dynasties moved further southeast in areas of the Hindu Kush (in present-day Afghanistan and Pakistan) and the Indus basin (in present-day Pakistan and India), where the Indo-Greek kingdoms were located.

In South Asia, Kushan emperors regularly used the dynastic name ΚΟϷΑΝΟ ("Koshano") on their coinage. Several inscriptions in Sanskrit in the Brahmi script, such as the Mathura inscription of the statue of Vima Kadphises, refer to the Kushan Emperor as, Ku-ṣā-ṇa ("Kushana"). Some later Indian literary sources referred to the Kushans as Turushka, a name which in later Sanskrit sources (Note: For example, the 12th century historical chronicle from Kashmir, the Rajatarangini, describes the Central Asia Kushans as Turushka (तुरुष्क).) was confused with Turk, "probably due to the fact that Tukharistan passed into the hands of the western Turks in the seventh century". According to John M. Rosenfield, Turushka, Tukhāra or Tukhāra are variations of the word Tokhari in Indian writings. Yet, according to André Wink, "nowadays no historian considers them to be Turkish-Mongoloid or "Hun", although there is no doubt about their Central-Asian origin."

In a 2013 study for genetic analysis of the burial sites identified as belonging to Yuezhi compared with those identified as belonging to Tocharians, Lanhai et al. suggested that both were different peoples. According to the authors, the Tocharians' paternal lineages were from East Eurasians, which differed from the Yuezhi, and hence did not share the same origin. Lanhai et al. suggested the Yuezhis to be a unique Central Asian group with West Eurasian origin, dissimilar to the origins of the Tocharians. Lanhai et al. noted that more evidence was needed to resolve the Tocharian-Yuezhi relationship.

== History ==
=== Early Kushans ===
Kushan portraits

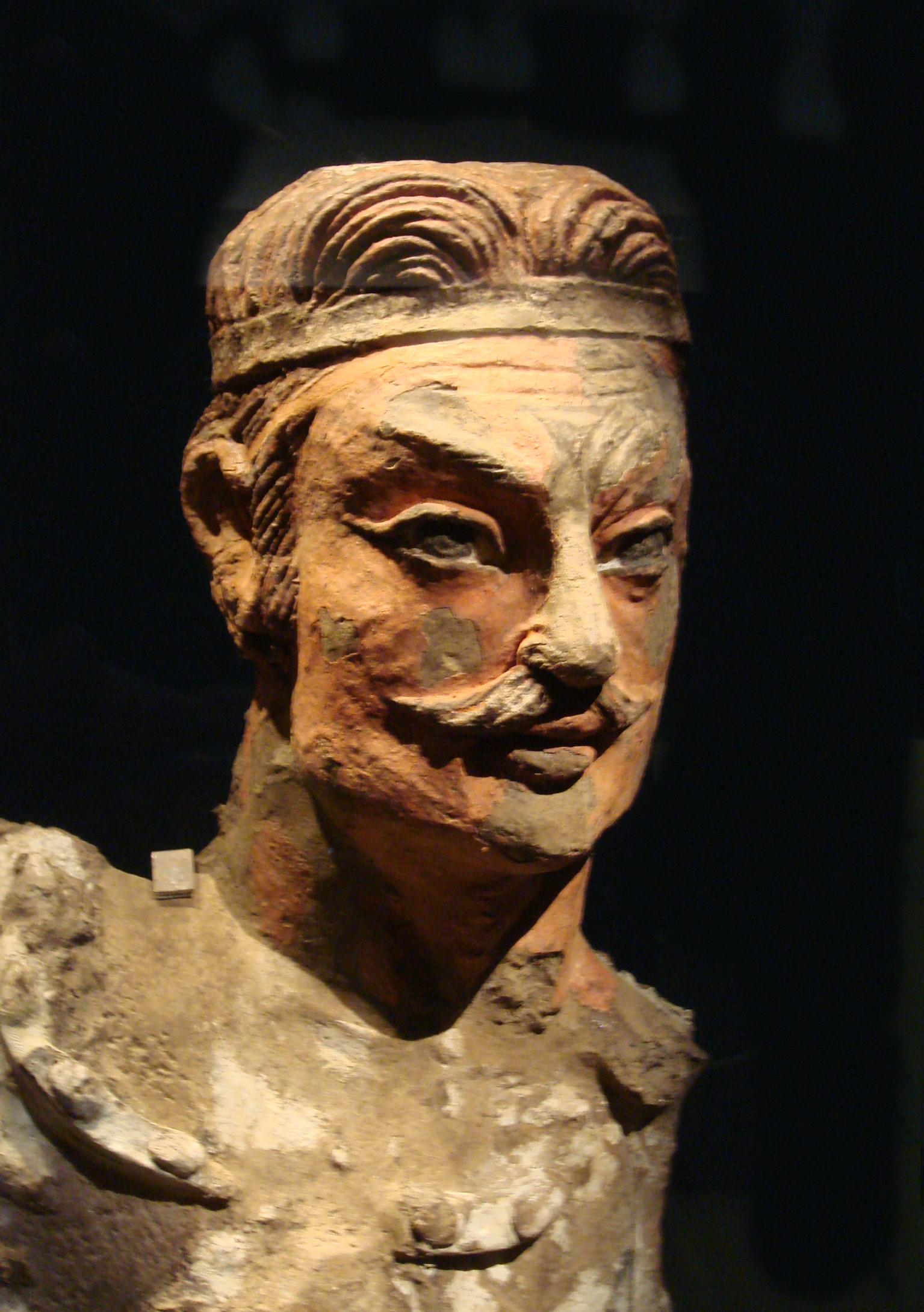
Head of a Yuezhi prince (Khalchayan palace, Uzbekistan)

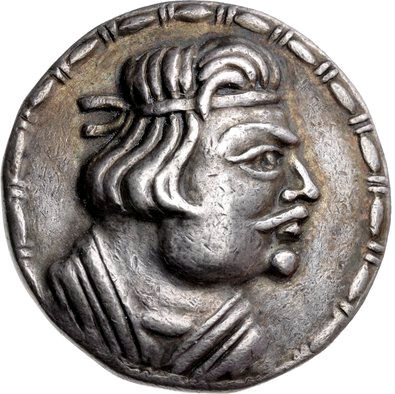
The first king to call himself "Kushan" on his coinage: Heraios (AD 1–30)

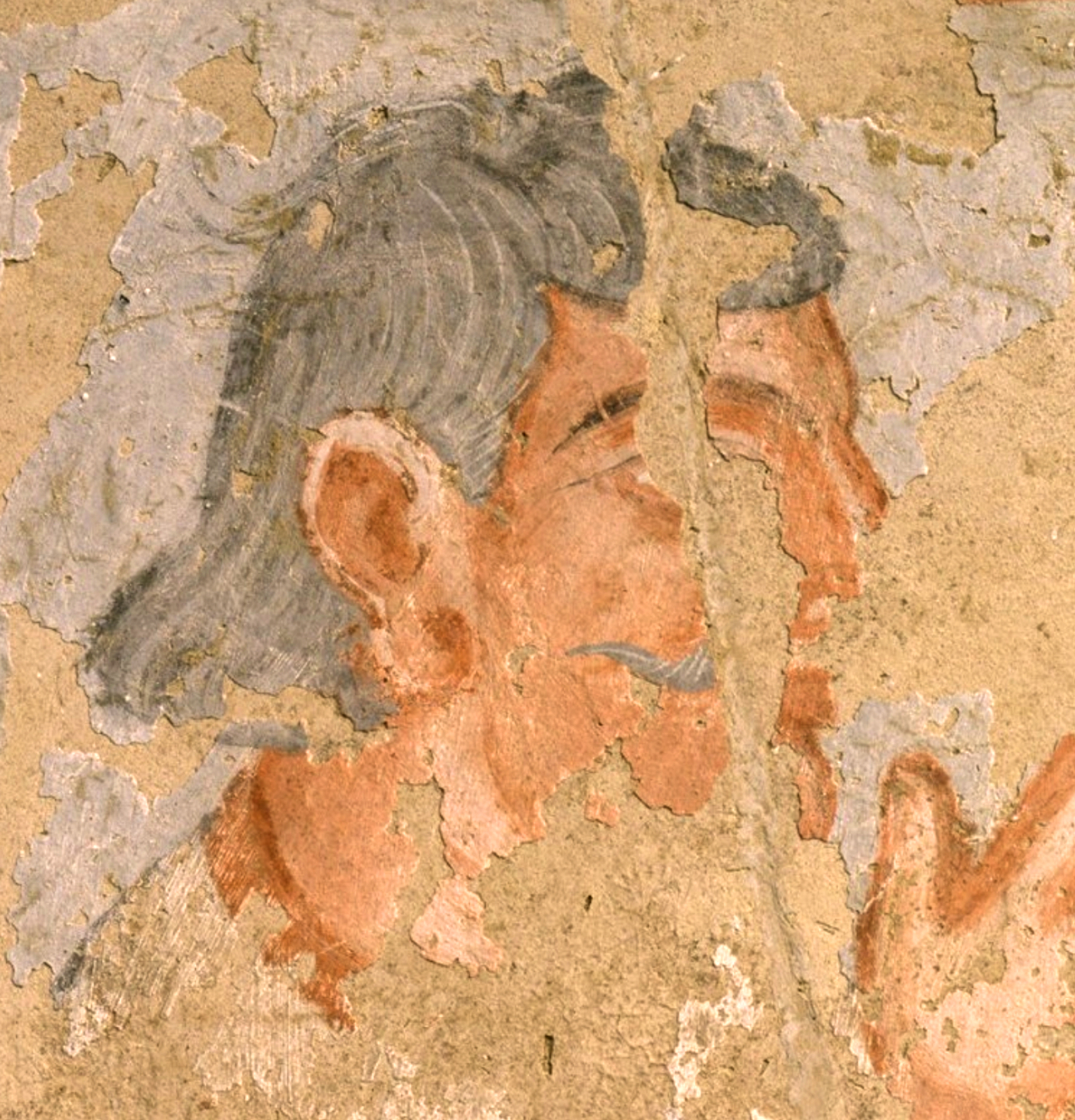
Kushan devotee (2nd century AD). Metropolitan Museum of Art (detail)

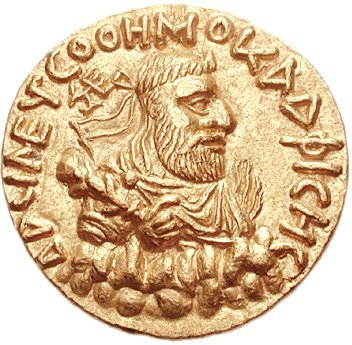
Portrait of Kushan emperor Vima Kadphises, AD 100–127

Some traces remain of the presence of the Kushans in the area of Bactria and Sogdiana in the 2nd–1st century BC where they had displaced the Sakas, who moved further south. Archaeological structures are known in Takht-i Sangin, Surkh Kotal (a monumental temple), and in the palace of Khalchayan. On the ruins of ancient Hellenistic cities such as Ai-Khanoum, the Kushans are known to have built fortresses. Various sculptures and friezes from this period are known, representing horse-riding archers, and, significantly, men such as the Kushan prince of Khalchayan with artificially deformed skulls, a practice well attested in nomadic Central Asia. Some of the Khalchayan sculptural scenes are also thought to depict the Kushans fighting against the Sakas. In these portrayals, the Yuezhi are shown with a majestic demeanour, whereas the Sakas are typically represented with side-whiskers, and more or less grotesque facial expressions.

The Chinese first referred to these people as the Yuezhi and stated them to have established the Kushan Empire, although the relationship between the Yuezhi and the Kushans is still unclear. Ban Gu's Book of Han tells us that the Kushans (Kuei-shuang) divided up Bactria in 128 BC. Fan Ye's Book of Later Han "relates how the chief of the Kushans, Ch'iu-shiu-ch'ueh (the Kujula Kadphises of coins), founded by means of the submission of the other Yueh-chih clans the Kushan Empire."

The name Guishuang was adopted in the West and modified into Kushan to designate the confederation, although the Chinese continued to call them Yuezhi. Gradually wresting control of the area from the Scythian tribes, the Kushans expanded south into the region traditionally known as Gandhara (an area primarily corresponding to the valley of Peshawar and Taxila in Pakistan) and established twin capitals in Kapisa (near modern Bagram) and Pushkalavati (later Charsadda).

=== Heraios ===
Kushan rulers are recorded for a period of about three centuries, from circa 30 CE to circa 375 CE, until the invasions of the Kidarites. The earliest documented ruler, and the first one to proclaim himself as a Kushan ruler, was Heraios. He calls himself a "tyrant" in Greek on his coins, and also exhibits skull deformation. He may have been an ally of the Greeks, and he shared the same style of coinage. Heraios may have been same as the first Kushan emperor Kujula Kadphises.

=== Kujula Kadphises ===
In the 1st century BC, the Guishuang (Ch: 貴霜) gained prominence over the other Yuezhi tribes, and welded them into a tight confederation under commander Kujula Kadphises. The Chinese Book of Later Han chronicles gives an account of the formation of the Kushan empire based on a report made by the Chinese general Ban Yong to the Chinese Emperor c. AD 125:

More than a hundred years later [than the conquest of Bactria by the Yuezhi], the prince [xihou] of Guishuang (Badakhshan) established himself as king, and his dynasty was called that of the Guishuang (Kushan) King. He invaded Anxi (Indo-Parthia), and took the Gaofu (Kabul) region. He also defeated the whole of the kingdoms of Puda (Paktiya) and Jibin (Kapisha and Gandhara). Qiujiuque (Kujula Kadphises) was more than eighty years old when he died. His son, Yangaozhen [probably Vema Tahk (tu) or, possibly, his brother Sadaṣkaṇa ], became king in his place. He defeated Tianzhu [North-western India] and installed Generals to supervise and lead it. The Yuezhi then became extremely rich. All the kingdoms call [their king] the Guishuang [Kushan] king, but the Han call them by their original name, Da Yuezhi.

— Book of Later Han.

Kujula issued an extensive series of coins and fathered at least two sons, Sadaṣkaṇa (who is known from only the Oḍirāja inscription of Senavarma, and apparently never ruled), and Vima Takto, according to the Rabatak inscription.

=== Vima Taktu ===
Vima Takto (Ancient Chinese: 閻膏珍 Yangaozhen) is mentioned in the Rabatak inscription. He was the father of Vima Kadphises. He expanded the Kushan Empire into the northwest of South Asia. The Book of the Later Han says:

"His son, Yangaozhen [probably Vema Tahk (tu) or, possibly, his brother Sadaṣkaṇa], became king in his place. He defeated Tianzhu [North-western India] and installed Generals to supervise and lead it. The Yuezhi then became extremely rich. All the kingdoms call [their king] the Guishuang [Kushan] king, but the Han call them by their original name, Da Yuezhi."

— Hou Hanshu

=== Vima Kadphises ===
Vima Kadphises (Kushan script: Οοημο Καδφισης) was a Kushan emperor from around AD 95–127, the grandson of Kujula Kadphises, and the father of Kanishka I, as detailed by the Rabatak inscription. Vima Kadphises added to the Kushan territory by his conquests in Bactria. He issued an extensive series of coins and inscriptions.

=== Kanishka I ===
Mathura statue of Kanishka

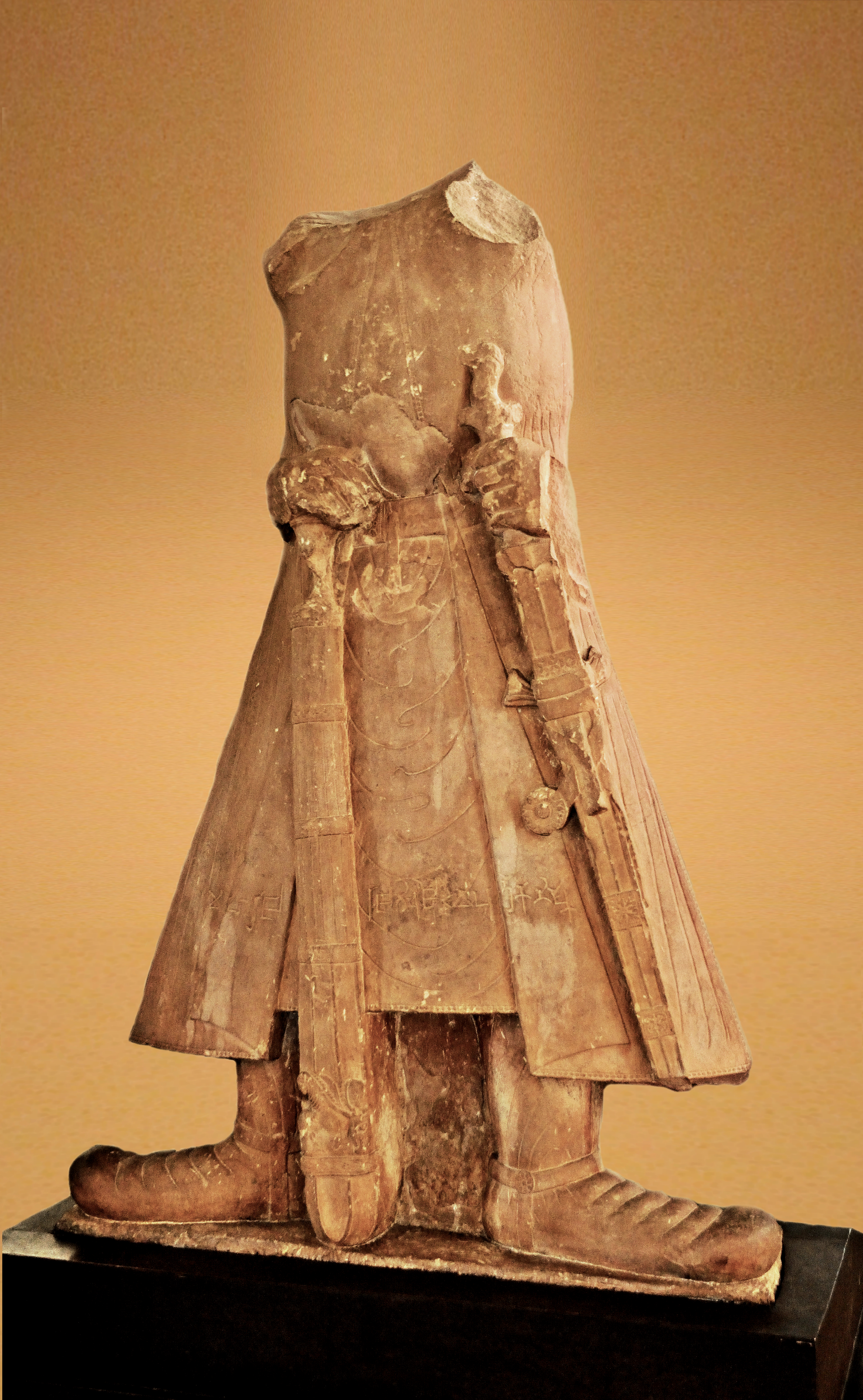
Statue of Kanishka in long coat and boots, holding a mace and a sword, in the Mathura Museum. An inscription runs along the bottom of the coat.

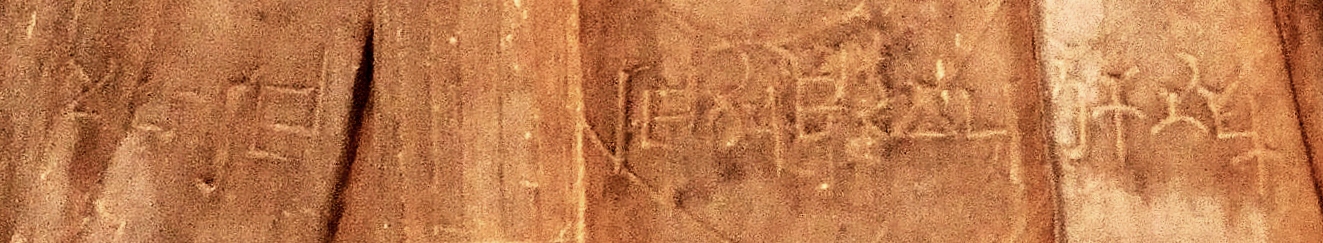
The inscription is in middle Brahmi script:

Mahārāja Rājadhirāja Devaputra Kāṇiṣka
"The Great King, King of Kings, Son of God, Kanishka".
Mathura art, Mathura Museum

The rule of Kanishka the Great, the fourth Kushan king, lasted for about 23 years from c. AD 127. Upon his accession, Kanishka ruled a huge territory, south to Ujjain and Kundina and east beyond Pataliputra, according to the Rabatak inscription:

In the year one, it has been proclaimed unto India, unto the whole realm of the governing class, including Koonadeano (Kaundiny, Kundina) and the city of Ozeno (Ozene, Ujjain) and the city of Zageda (Saketa) and the city of Kozambo (Kausambi) and the city of Palabotro (Pataliputra) and as far as the city of Ziri-tambo (Sri-Champa), whatever rulers and other important persons (they might have) he had submitted to (his) will, and he had submitted all India to (his) will.

— Rabatak inscription, Lines 4–8

His territory was administered from two capitals: Purushapura, now Peshawar in northwestern Pakistan, and Mathura, in northern India. The Kushans also had a summer capital in Kapisa (near modern Bagram), where the "Treasure of Begram", comprising works of art from Greece to China, has been found. According to the Rabatak inscription, Kanishka was the son of Vima Kadphises and the great-grandson of Kujula Kadphises, the founder of the dynasty. Kanishka's era is now generally accepted to have begun in 127 on the basis of Harry Falk's research.

==== Territorial peak ====
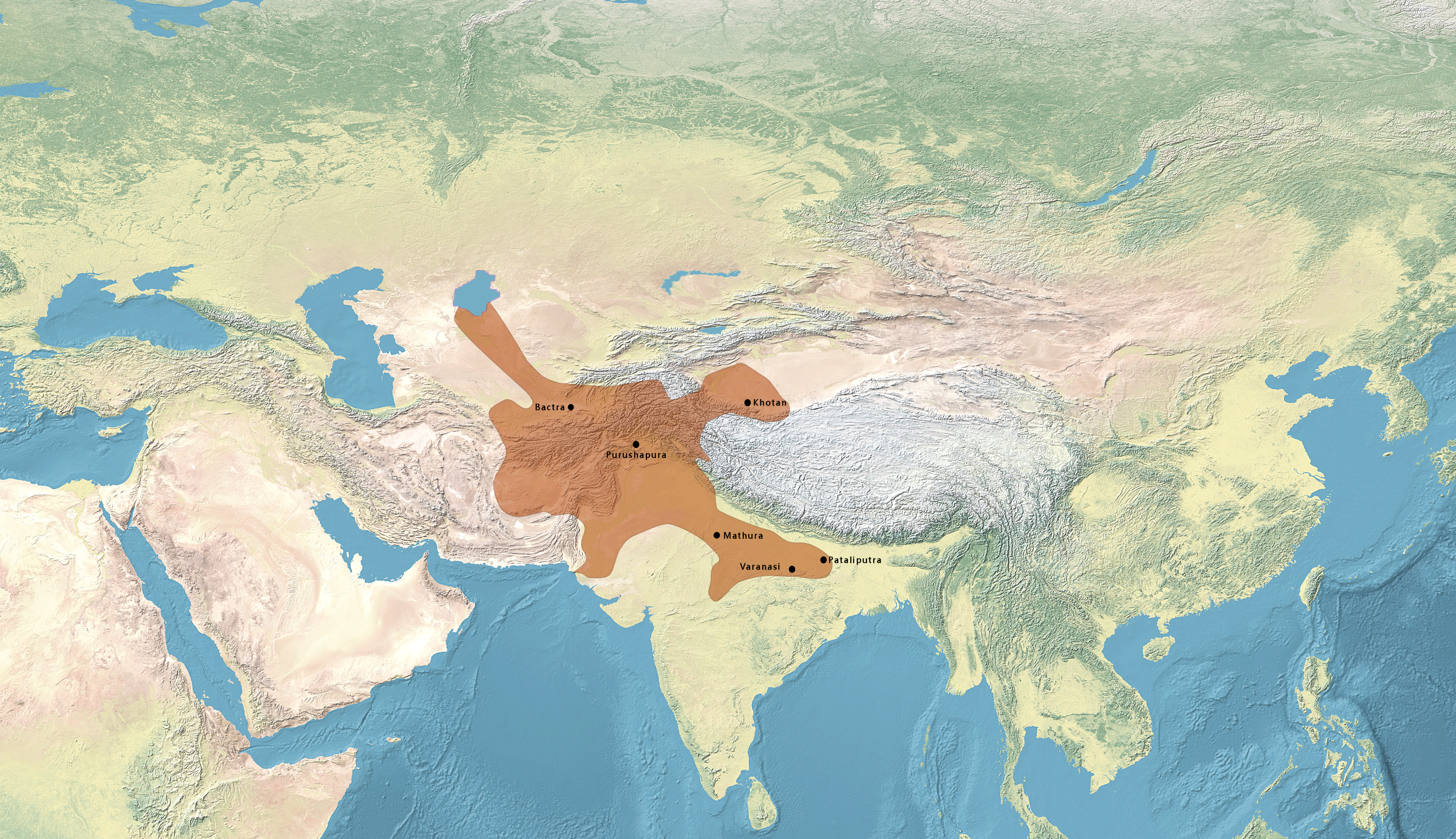
Kushan territories (full line) and maximum extent of Kushan control under Kanishka the Great. The extent of Kushan control is notably documented in the Rabatak inscription. (Note: See also the analysis of Sims-Williams & Cribb (1995–1996), specialists of the field, who had a central role in the decipherment.) The northern expansion into the Tarim Basin is mainly suggested by coin finds and Chinese chronicles.

Rosenfield notes that archaeological evidence of a Kushan rule of long duration is present in an area stretching from Surkh Kotal, Kapisa, the summer capital of the Kushans, Purushapura (modern Peshawar), the capital under Kanishka I, Taxila, and Mathura, the winter capital of the Kushans. The Kushans introduced for the first time a form of governance which consisted of Kshatrapas (Brahmi:, Kṣatrapa, "Satraps") and Mahakshatrapa (Brahmi:, Mahakṣatrapa, "Great Satraps").

Other areas of probable rule include Khwarezm and its capital city of Toprak-Kala, Kausambi (excavations of Allahabad University), Sanchi and Sarnath (inscriptions with names and dates of Kushan kings), Malwa and Maharashtra, and Odisha (imitation of Kushan coins, and large Kushan hoards).

The Rabatak inscription, dated early in the Kanishka era (incept probably AD 127) and discovered in 1993, confirms the account of the Hou Hanshu and Weilüe, that Kushan dominions had expanded into the heartland of northern India by the early 2nd century AD. Lines 4 to 7 of the inscription describe the cities which were under the rule of Kanishka, (Note: For a translation of the full text of the Rabatak inscription see: Mukherjee (1995). This translation is quoted in: Goyal (2005), p. 88.) among which six names are identifiable: Ujjain, Kundina, Saketa, Kausambi, Pataliputra, and Champa (although the text is not clear whether Champa was a possession of Kanishka or just beyond it). The Buddhist text Śrīdharmapiṭakanidānasūtra — known via a Chinese translation made in AD 472 — refers to the conquest of Pataliputra by Kanishka. A 2nd century stone inscription by a Great Satrap named Rupiamma was discovered in Pauni, south of the Narmada river, suggesting that Kushan control extended this far south, although this could alternatively have been controlled by the Western Satraps.

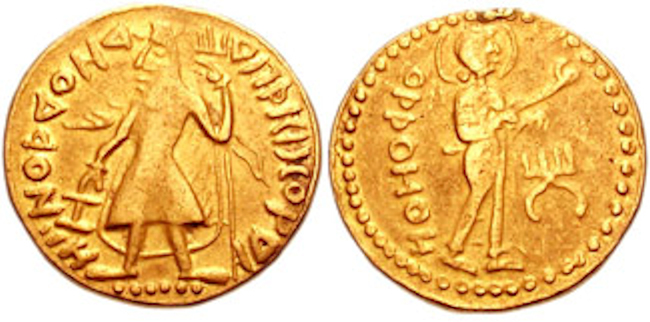
Eastern reach as far as Bengal: Samatata coinage of king Vira Jadamarah, in imitation of the Kushan coinage of Kanishka I. The text of the legend is a meaningless imitation. Bengal, circa 2nd-3rd century AD.

In the East, as late as the 3rd century AD, decorated coins of Huvishka were dedicated at Bodh Gaya together with other gold offerings under the "Enlightenment Throne" of the Buddha, suggesting direct Kushan influence in the area during that period. Coins of the Kushans are found in abundance as far as Bengal, and the ancient Bengali state of Samatata issued coins copied from the coinage of Kanishka I, although probably only as a result of commercial influence. Coins in imitation of Kushan coinage have also been found abundantly in the eastern state of Orissa.

In the West, the Kushan state covered the Pārata state of western Pakistan, Afghanistan, Kyrgyzstan, Tajikistan, Uzbekistan, and Turkmenistan. Turkmenistan was known for the Kushan Buddhist city of Merv.

Northward, in the 1st century AD, the Kujula Kadphises sent an army to the Tarim Basin to support the city-state of Kucha, which had been resisting the Chinese invasion of the region, but they retreated after minor encounters. In the 2nd century AD, the Kushans under Kanishka made various forays into the Tarim Basin, where they had various contacts with the Chinese. Kanishka held areas of the Tarim Basin apparently corresponding to the ancient regions held by the Yüeh-zhi, the possible ancestors of the Kushan. There was Kushan influence on coinage in Kashgar, Yarkand, and Khotan. According to Chinese chronicles, the Kushans (referred to as Da Yuezhi in Chinese sources) requested, but were denied, a Han princess, even though they had sent presents to the Chinese court. In retaliation, they marched on Ban Chao in AD 90 with a force of 70,000 but were defeated by the smaller Chinese force. Chinese chronicles relate battles between the Kushans and the Chinese general Ban Chao. The Yuezhi retreated and paid tribute to the Chinese Empire. The regions of the Tarim Basin were all ultimately conquered by Ban Chao. Later, during the Yuánchū period (AD 114–120), the Kushans sent a military force to install Chenpan, who had been a hostage among them, as king of Kashgar.

=== Huvishka ===
Huvishka (Kushan: Οοηϸκι, "Ooishki") was a Kushan emperor from the death of Kanishka (assumed on the best evidence available to be in 150) until the succession of Vasudeva I about thirty years later. His rule was a period of retrenchment and consolidation for the empire. In particular he devoted time and effort early in his reign to the exertion of greater control over the city of Mathura.

=== Vasudeva I ===
Vasudeva I (Kushan: Βαζοδηο "Bazodeo", Chinese: 波調 "Bodiao") was the last of the "Great Kushans". Named inscriptions dating from year 64 to 98 of Kanishka's era suggest his reign extended from at least AD 191 to 225. He was the last great Kushan emperor, and the end of his rule coincides with the invasion of the Sasanians as far as northwestern India, and the establishment of the Indo-Sasanians or Kushanshahs in what is nowadays Afghanistan, Pakistan and northwestern India from around AD 240.

=== Decline ===
==== Kanishka II ====
Kanishka II (Brahmi: 𑀓𑀸𑀡𑀺𑀱𑁆𑀓; Kā-ṇi-ṣka) was one of the emperors of the Kushan Empire from around 232–247 CE. He succeeded Vasudeva I who is considered to be the last great Kushan emperor.

==== Vāsishka ====
Vāsishka was a Kushan emperor who seems to have had a 20-year reign following Kanishka II. His rule is recorded at Mathura, in Gandhara and as far south as Sanchi (near Vidisa), where several inscriptions in his name have been found, dated to the year 22 (the Sanchi inscription of "Vaksushana" – i.e., Vasishka Kushana) and year 28 (the Sanchi inscription of Vasaska – i.e., Vasishka) of a possible second Kanishka era.

==== Little Kushans ====
Following territorial losses in the west (Bactria lost to the Kushano-Sasanians), and in the east (loss of Mathura to the Gupta Empire), several "Little Kushans" are known, who ruled locally in the area of Punjab with their capital at Taxila: Vasudeva II (270 – 300), Mahi (300 – 305), Shaka (305 – 335) and Kipunada (335 – 350). They probably were vassals of the Gupta Empire, until the invasion of the Kidarites destroyed the last remains of Kushan rule.

==== Kushano-Sassanians ====
Sasanian control of the Western Kushans

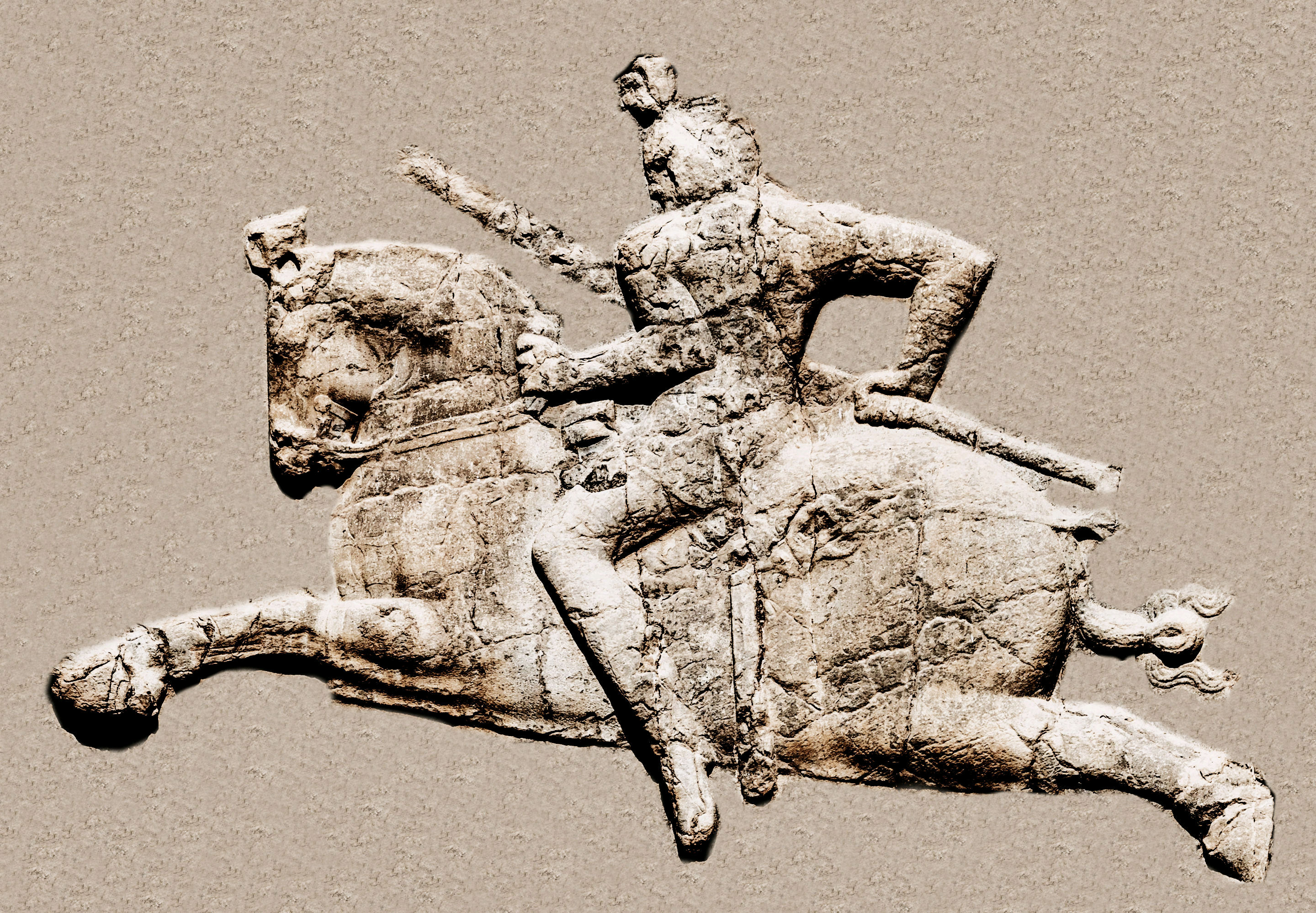
Hormizd I Kushanshah (AD 277–286), king of the Indo-Sasanians, maintained Sasanian rule in former Kushan territories of the northwest. Naqsh-e Rustam Bahram II panel.

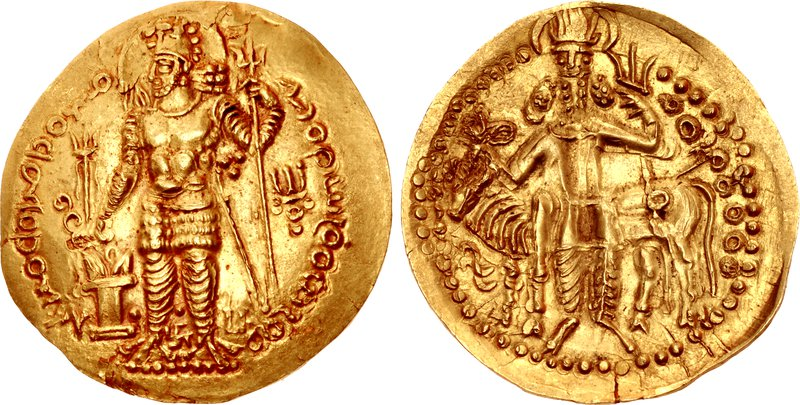
The Kushano-Sasanians imitated the Kushans in some of their Bactrian coinage. Coin of Sasanian ruler Peroz I Kushanshah, with Bactrian legend around "Peroz the Great Kushan King"

After the death of Vasudeva I in 225, the Kushan empire split into western and eastern halves. The Western Kushans (in Afghanistan) were soon subjugated by the Persian Sasanian Empire and lost Sogdiana, Bactria, and Gandhara to them. The Sassanian king Shapur I (240–270) claims in his Naqsh-e Rostam inscription possession of the territory of the Kushans (Kūšān šahr) as far as Purushapura (modern Peshawar), suggesting he controlled Bactria and areas as far as the Hindu-Kush or even south of it:

I, the Mazda-worshipping lord, Shapur, king of kings of Iran and An-Iran... (I) am the Master of the Domain of Iran (Ērānšahr) and possess the territory of Persis, Parthian... Hindestan, the Domain of the Kushan up to the limits of Paškabur and up to Kash, Sughd, and Chachestan.

— Shapur I's inscription at the Ka'ba-ye Zartosht, Naqsh-e Rostam

This is also confirmed by the Rag-i-Bibi inscription in modern Afghanistan.

The Sasanians deposed the Western dynasty and replaced them with Persian vassals known as the Kushanshas (in Bactrian on their coinage: KΟÞANΟ ÞAΟ Koshano Shao) also called Indo-Sasanians or Kushano-Sasanians. The Kushano-Sasanians ultimately became very powerful under Hormizd I Kushanshah (277–286) and rebelled against the Sasanian Empire, while continuing many aspects of the Kushan culture, visible in particular in their titulature and their coinage.

==== "Little Kushans" and Gupta suzerainty ====
Gupta control over the Eastern Kushans

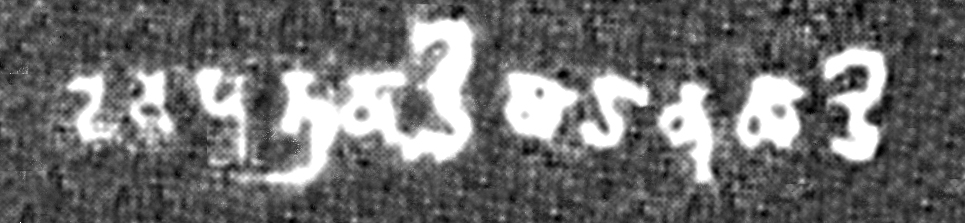
The expression Devaputra Shāhi Shāhānu Shāhi in Middle Brahmi in the Allahabad pillar (Line 23), claimed by Samudragupta to be under his dominion.

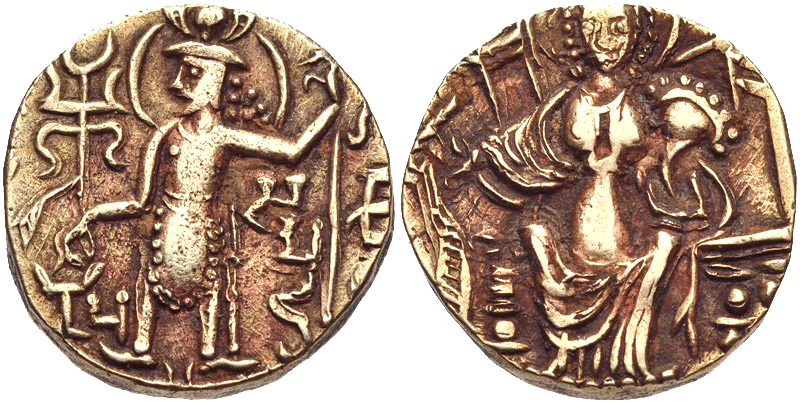
Coin minted in the Punjab area with the name "Samudra" ( Sa-mu-dra), thought to be the Gupta ruler Samudragupta. These coins imitate those of the last Kushan ruler Kipunada, and precede the coinage of the first Kidarite Huns in northwestern India. Circa 350-375.

The Eastern Kushan kingdom, also known as the "Little Kushans", was based in the Punjab. Around 270 their territories on the Gangetic plain became independent under local dynasties such as the Yaudheyas. Then in the mid-4th century they were subjugated by the Gupta Empire under Samudragupta. In his inscription on the Allahabad pillar Samudragupta proclaims that the Dēvaputra-Shāhi-Shāhānushāhi (referring to the last Kushan rulers, being a deformation of the Kushan regnal titles Devaputra, Shao and Shaonanoshao: "Son of God, King, King of Kings") are now under his dominion, and that they were forced to "self-surrender, offering (their own) daughters in marriage and a request for the administration of their own districts and provinces". This suggests that by the time of the Allahabad inscription the Kushans still ruled in Punjab, but under the suzerainty of the Gupta Emperor.

Numismatics indicate that the coinage of the Eastern Kushans was much weakened: silver coinage was abandoned altogether, and gold coinage was debased. This suggests that the Eastern Kushans had lost their central trading role on the trade routes that supplied luxury goods and gold. Still, the Buddhist art of Gandhara continued to flourish, and cities such as Sirsukh near Taxila were established.

==== Sasanian, Kidarite and Alchon invasions ====
Location of the Little Kushans in the northwestern part of the subcontinent, and contemporary South Asian polities circa 350 CE.

In the east around 350, Shapur II regained the upper hand against the Kushano-Sasanian Kingdom and took control of large territories in areas now known as Afghanistan and Pakistan, possibly as a consequence of the destruction of the Kushano-Sasanians by the Chionites. The Kushano-Sasanian still ruled in the north. Important finds of Sasanian coinage beyond the Indus River in the city of Taxila only start with the reigns of Shapur II (r.309–379) and Shapur III (r.383–388), suggesting that the expansion of Sasanian control beyond the Indus was the result of the wars of Shapur II "with the Chionites and Kushans" in 350-358 as described by Ammianus Marcellinus. They probably maintained control until the rise of the Kidarites under their ruler Kidara.

In 360 a Kidarite Hun named Kidara overthrew the Kushano-Sasanians and remnants of the old Kushan dynasty, and established the Kidarite Kingdom. The Kushan style of Kidarite coins indicates they claimed Kushan heritage. The Kidarite seem to have been rather prosperous, although on a smaller scale than their Kushan predecessors. East of Punjab, the former eastern territories of the Kushans were controlled by the Gupta Empire.

== Culture ==
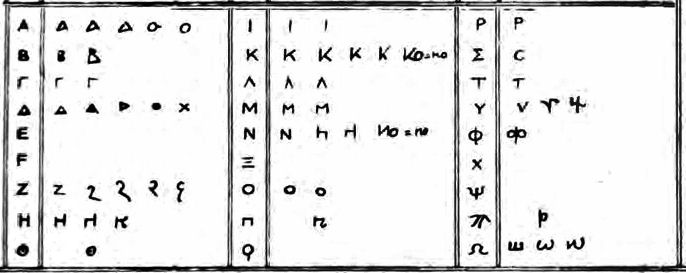
Greek alphabet (narrow columns) with Kushan script (wide columns)

The Kushans adopted elements of the Hellenistic culture of Bactria. They adopted the Greek alphabet to suit their own language (with the additional development of the letter Þ "sh", as in "Kushan") and soon began minting coinage on the Greek model. On their coins they used Greek language legends combined with Pali legends (in the Kharosthi script), until the first few years of the reign of Kanishka. After the middle of Kanishka's reign, they used Kushan language legends (in an adapted Greek script), combined with legends in Greek (Greek script) and legends in Prakrit (Kharoshthi script).

Interestingly there is evidence for the collaboration between Greek populations and the Kushans in the 2nd century AD. Apparently the main architect of the Kushan temple at Surkh Kotal was a Greek named Palamedes. A Greek inscription has been found which could be read as: ΔΙΑ ΠΑΛΑΜΕΔΟΥΣ, i.e. dia Palamedous, meaning "through or by Palamedes". This shows that Hellenistic populations still remained in Bactria up into the Kushan era, and also explains how the Greek alphabet could have been applied to the Bactrian language.

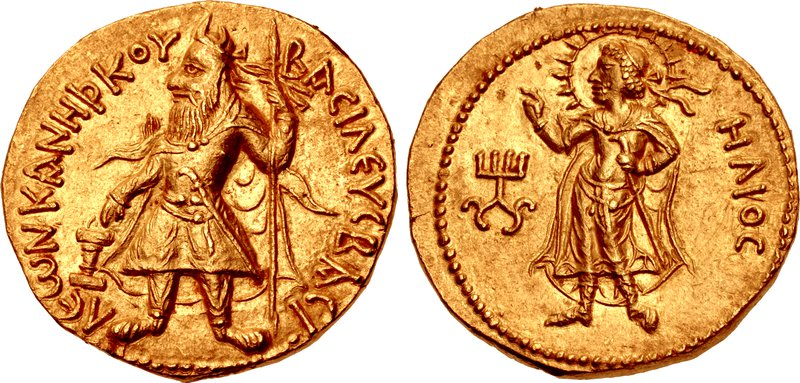
Early gold coin of Kanishka I with Greek language legend and Hellenistic divinity Helios. (c. AD 120). Obverse: Kanishka standing, clad in heavy Kushan coat and long boots, flames emanating from shoulders, holding a standard in his left hand, and making a sacrifice over an altar. Greek legend: ΒΑΣΙΛΕΥΣ ΒΑΣΙΛΕΩΝ ΚΑΝΗϷΚΟΥ Basileus Basileon Kanishkoy "[Coin] of Kanishka, king of kings". Reverse: Standing Helios in Hellenistic style, forming a benediction gesture with the right hand. Legend in Greek script: ΗΛΙΟC Helios Kanishka monogram (tamgha) to the left.

The Kushans "adopted many local beliefs and customs, including Zoroastrianism and the two rising religions in the region, the Greek cults and Buddhism". From the time of Vima Takto, many Kushans started adopting aspects of Buddhist culture, and like the Egyptians, they absorbed the strong remnants of the Greek culture of the Hellenistic Kingdoms, becoming at least partly Hellenised. The great Kushan emperor Vima Kadphises, father of Kanishka, embraced Shaivism, a sect of Hinduism, as surmised by coins minted during the period. The following Kushan emperors represented a wide variety of faiths including Mahayana Buddhism, Zoroastrianism and Hindu Shaivism.

The rule of the Kushans linked the seagoing trade of the Indian Ocean with the commerce of the Silk Road through the long-civilized Indus Valley. At the height of the dynasty, the Kushans loosely ruled a territory that extended to the Aral Sea through present-day Uzbekistan, Afghanistan, Pakistan and northern India.

The loose unity and comparative peace of such a vast expanse encouraged long-distance trade, brought Chinese silks to Rome, and created strings of flourishing urban centers.

During the reigns of Kanishka I and Huvishka, the dynastic self-representation of the Kushan emperors was formed from ethnic and cultural elements characteristic of Bactria. This may have been intended to reinforce the conception of Bactria or more precisely, Tokharistan as the imperial homeland of the Kushans, the site at which Kanishka’s successful conquest of India was commemorated. Such a reorientation is especially noteworthy in view of the pronounced emphasis on Indian cultural motifs that characterized the coinage of Vima Kadphises. In the later period, the western territories of the Kushan Empire, including Bactria itself, fell under Sasanian control, confining Kushan rule to Indian lands alone. This territorial contraction appears to have encouraged a further evolution of their dynastic self-representation toward a more distinctly Indian identity. (Note: "On a seal of Kaniška II or III, the king has lost his designation ‘Kušān’ but now has the new title υνδογανο þαο ‘king of the Indians’ (Sims-Williams – Tucker 2006, 588). The Kamra inscription of Vasiška does mention the designation, whereas the Ārā Inscription of his son Kaniška III does not (on both inscriptions cf. Falk 2009, 27–28); at the same time the title Kušānšāh was used by the Sāsānian subsidiary dynasty in Bactria, and the territory was also named the Kušānšahr in Sāsānian inscriptions, (so noted by Cribb 2018, 17).")

== Religion ==
=== Kushan deities ===
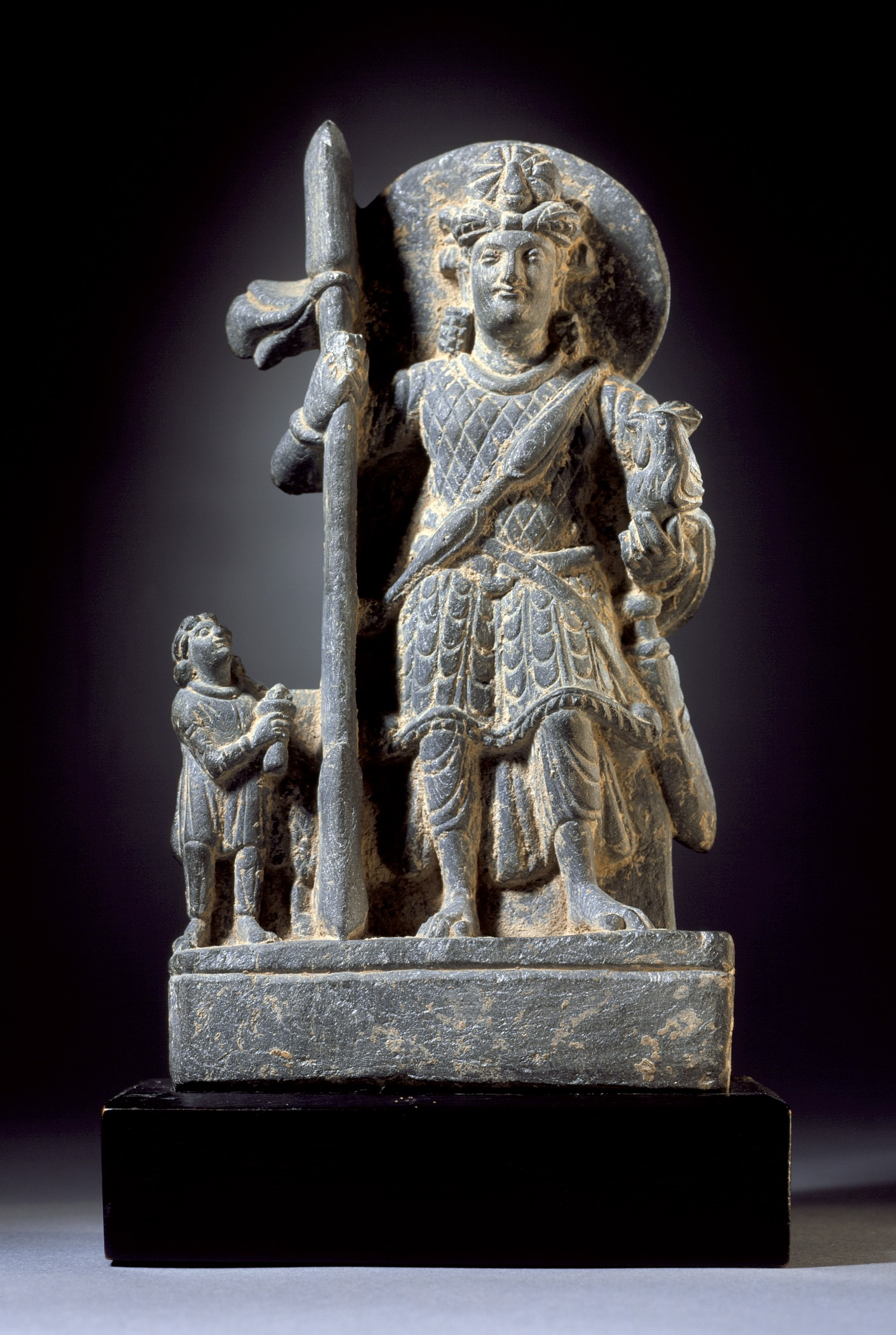
Kumara/Kartikeya with a Kushan devotee, 2nd century AD

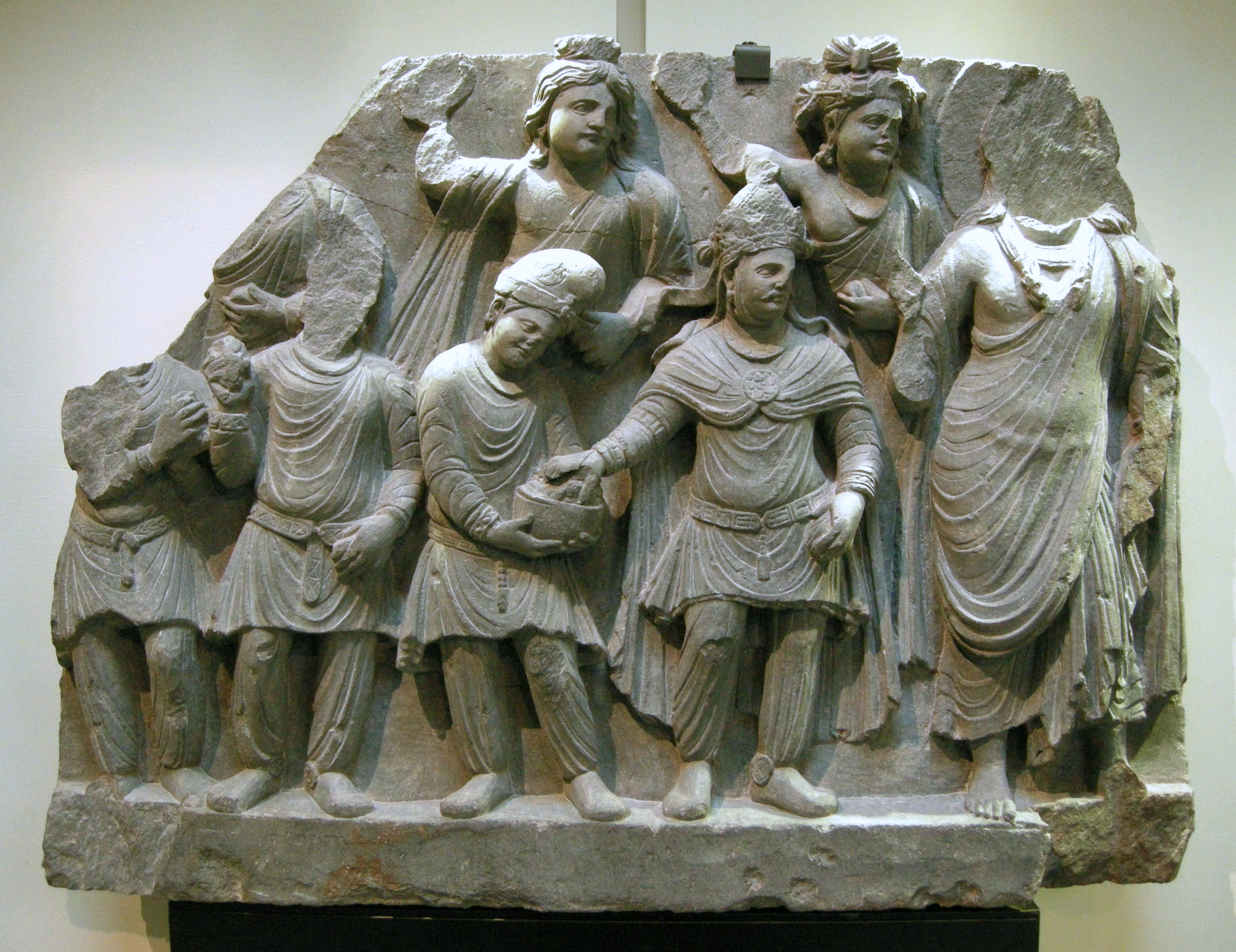
Kushan prince, said to be Huvishka, making a donation to a Boddhisattva.

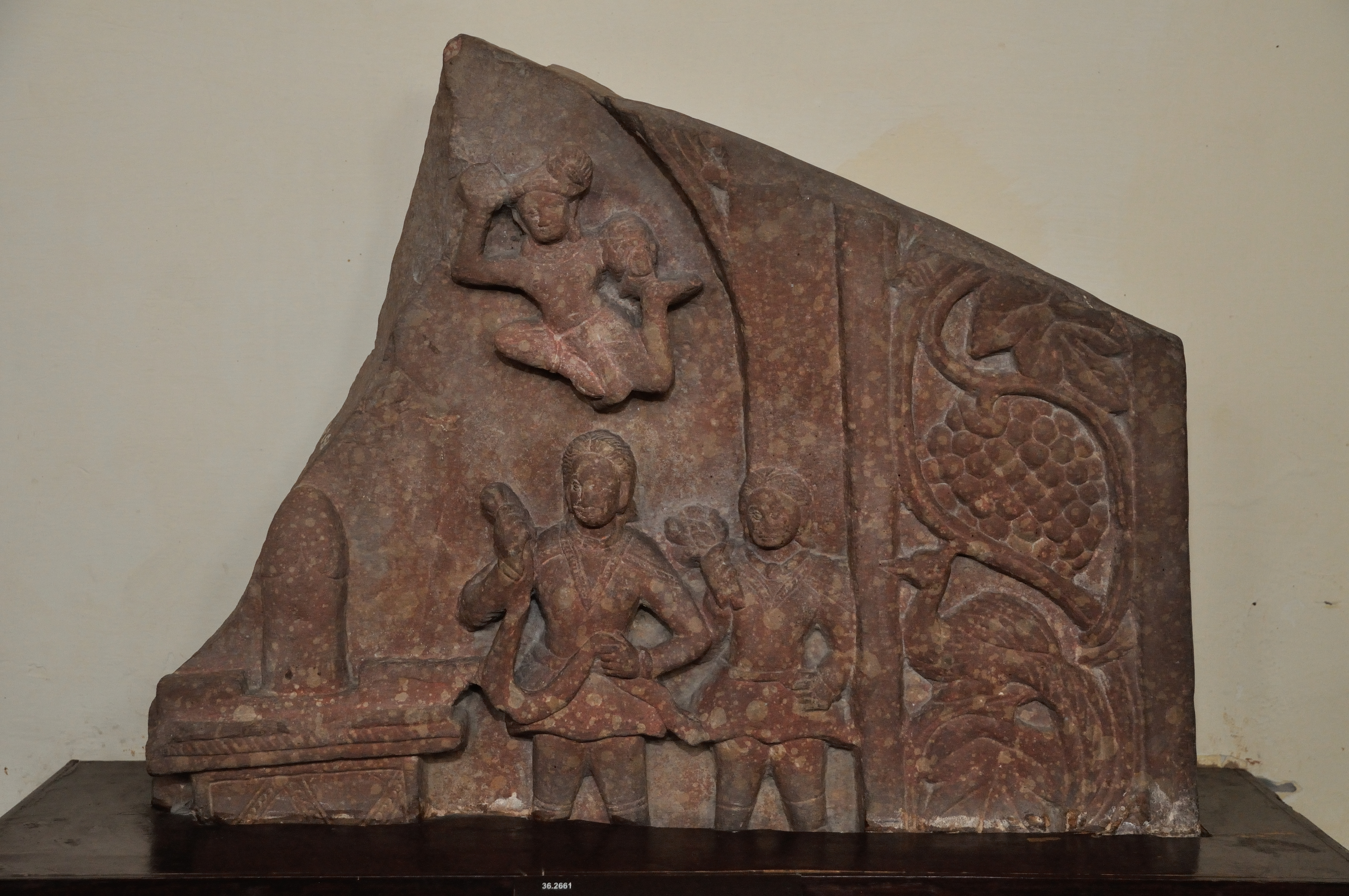
Shiva Linga worshipped by Kushan devotees, circa 2nd century AD

The Kushan religious pantheon is extremely varied, as revealed by their coins that were made in gold, silver, and copper. These coins contained more than thirty different gods, belonging mainly to their own Iranian, as well as Greek and Indian worlds as well. Kushan coins had images of Kushan Kings, Buddha, and figures from the Indo-Aryan and Iranian pantheons. Greek deities, with Greek names are represented on early coins. During Kanishka's reign, the language of the coinage changes to Bactrian (though it remained in Greek script for all kings). After Huvishka, only two divinities appear on the coins: Ardoxsho and Oesho (see details below).

The Iranian entities depicted on coinage include:

- Ardoxsho (Αρδοχþο): Ashi Vanghuhi
- Ashaeixsho (Aþαειχþo, "Best righteousness"): Asha Vahishta
- Athsho (Αθþο, "The Royal fire"): Atar
- Pharro (Φαρρο, "Royal splendour"): Khwarenah
- Lrooaspa (Λροοασπο): Drvaspa
- Manaobago (Μαναοβαγο): Vohu Manah
- Mao (Μαο, the Lunar deity): Mah
- Mithro and variants (Μιθρο, Μιιρο, Μιορο, Μιυρο): Mithra
- Mozdooano (Μοζδοοανο, "Mazda the victorious?"): Mazda *vana
- Nana (Νανα, Ναναια, Ναναϸαο): variations of pan-Asiatic Nana, Sogdian Nny
- Oado (Οαδο): Vata
- Oaxsho (Oαxþo): "Oxus"
- Ooromozdo (Οορομοζδο): Ahura Mazda
- Ořlagno (Οραλαγνο): Verethragna, the Iranian god of war
- Rishti (Ριϸτι, "Uprightness"): Arshtat
- Shaoreoro (Ϸαορηορο, "Best royal power", Archetypal ruler): Khshathra Vairya
- Tiero (Τιερο): Tir

Representation of entities from Greek mythology and Hellenistic syncretism are:

- Zaoou (Ζαοου): Zeus
- Ēlios (Ηλιος): Helios
- Ēphaēstos (Ηφαηστος): Hephaistos
- Oa nēndo (Οα νηνδο): Nike
- Salēnē (Ϲαληνη): Selene
- Anēmos (Ανημος): Anemos
- Ērakilo (Ηρακιλο): Heracles
- Sarapo (Ϲαραπο): the Greco-Egyptian god Sarapis

The Indic entities represented on coinage include:

- Boddo (Βοδδο): the Buddha
- Shakamano Boddho (Ϸακαμανο Βοδδο): Shakyamuni Buddha
- Metrago Boddo (Μετραγο Βοδδο): the bodhisattava Maitreya
- Maaseno (Μαασηνο): Mahāsena
- Skando-Komaro (Σκανδο-kομαρο): Skanda-Kumara
- Bizago: Viśākha
- Ommo: Umā, the consort of Siva.
- Oesho (Οηϸο): long considered to represent Indic Shiva, but also identified as Avestan Vayu conflated with Shiva.
- Two copper coins of Huvishka bear a "Ganesa" legend, but instead of depicting the typical theriomorphic figure of Ganesha, have a figure of an archer holding a full-length bow with string inwards and an arrow. This is typically a depiction of Rudra, but in the case of these two coins is generally assumed to represent Shiva.
Images of Kushan worshippers
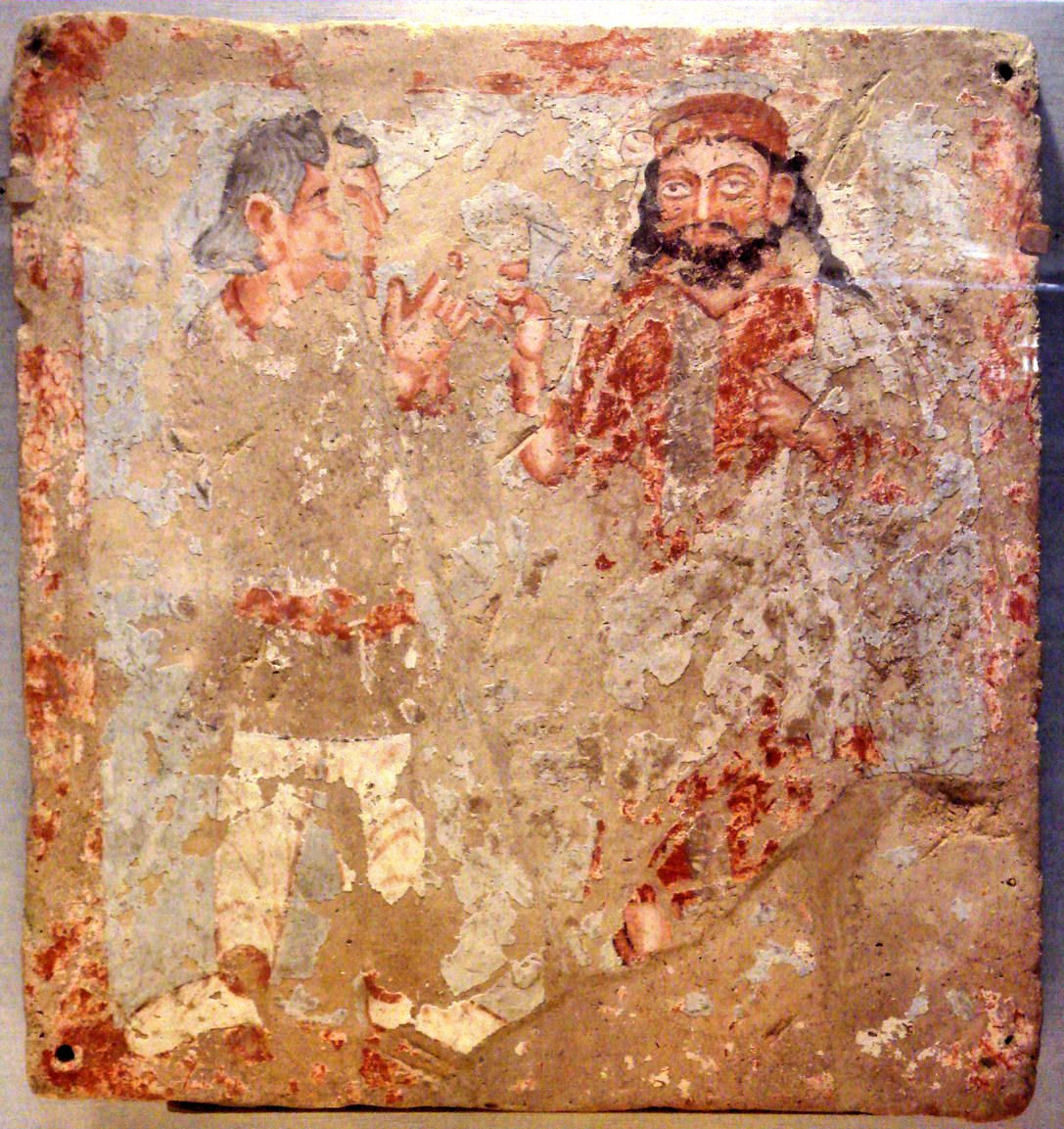
Kushan worshipper with Zeus/Serapis/Ohrmazd, Bactria, 3rd century AD.

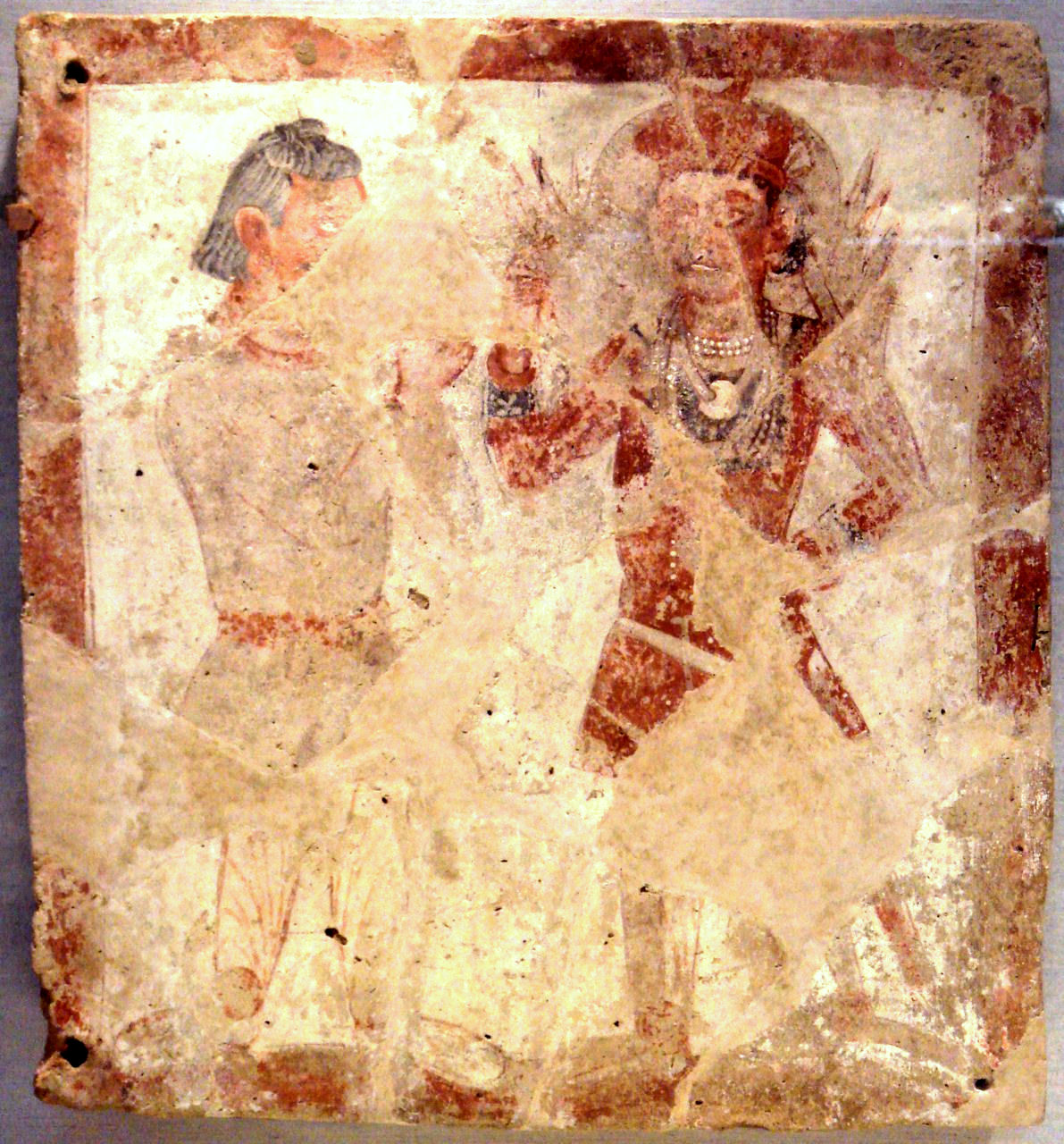
Kushan worshipper with Pharro, Bactria, 3rd century AD.

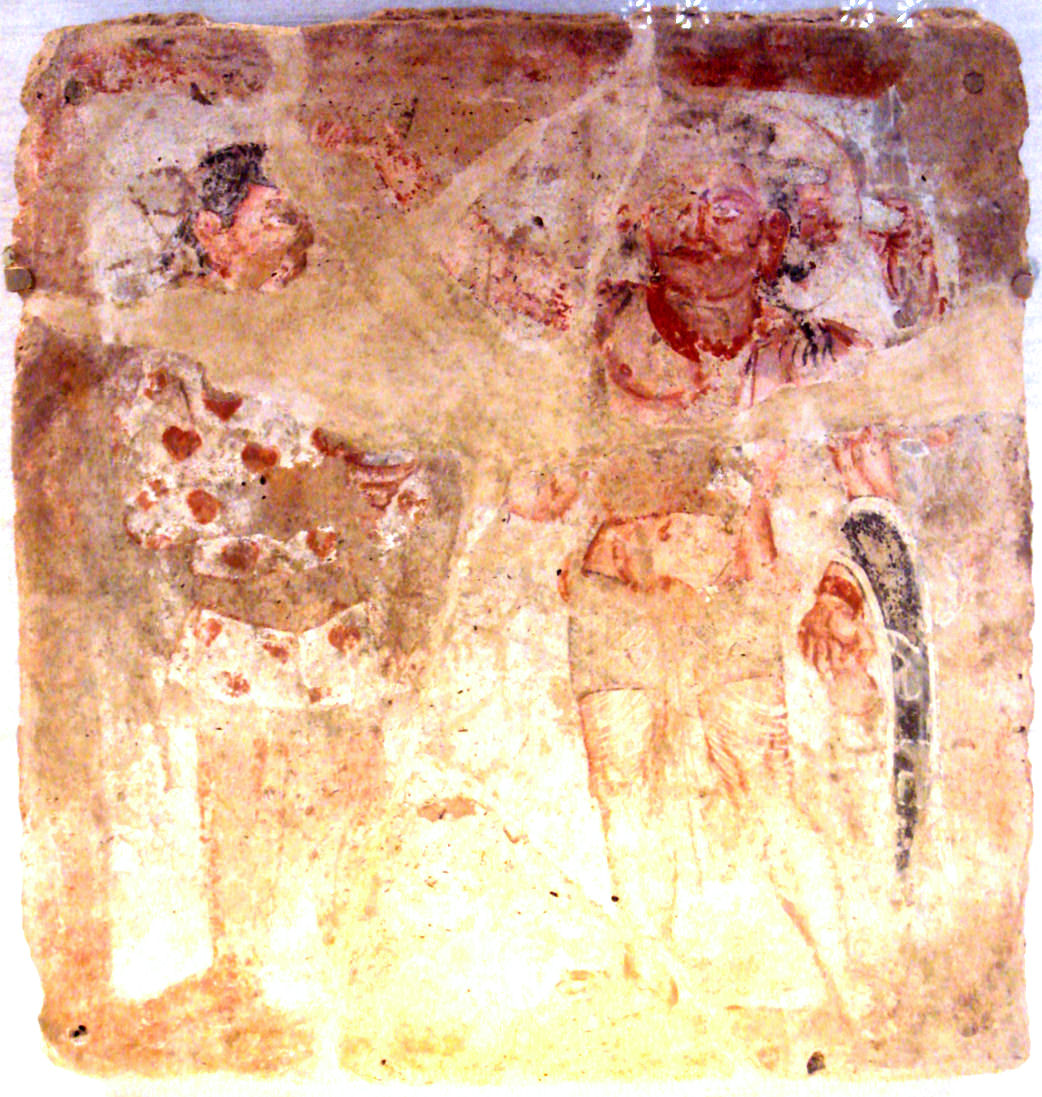
Kushan worshipper with Shiva/Oesho, Bactria, 3rd century AD.

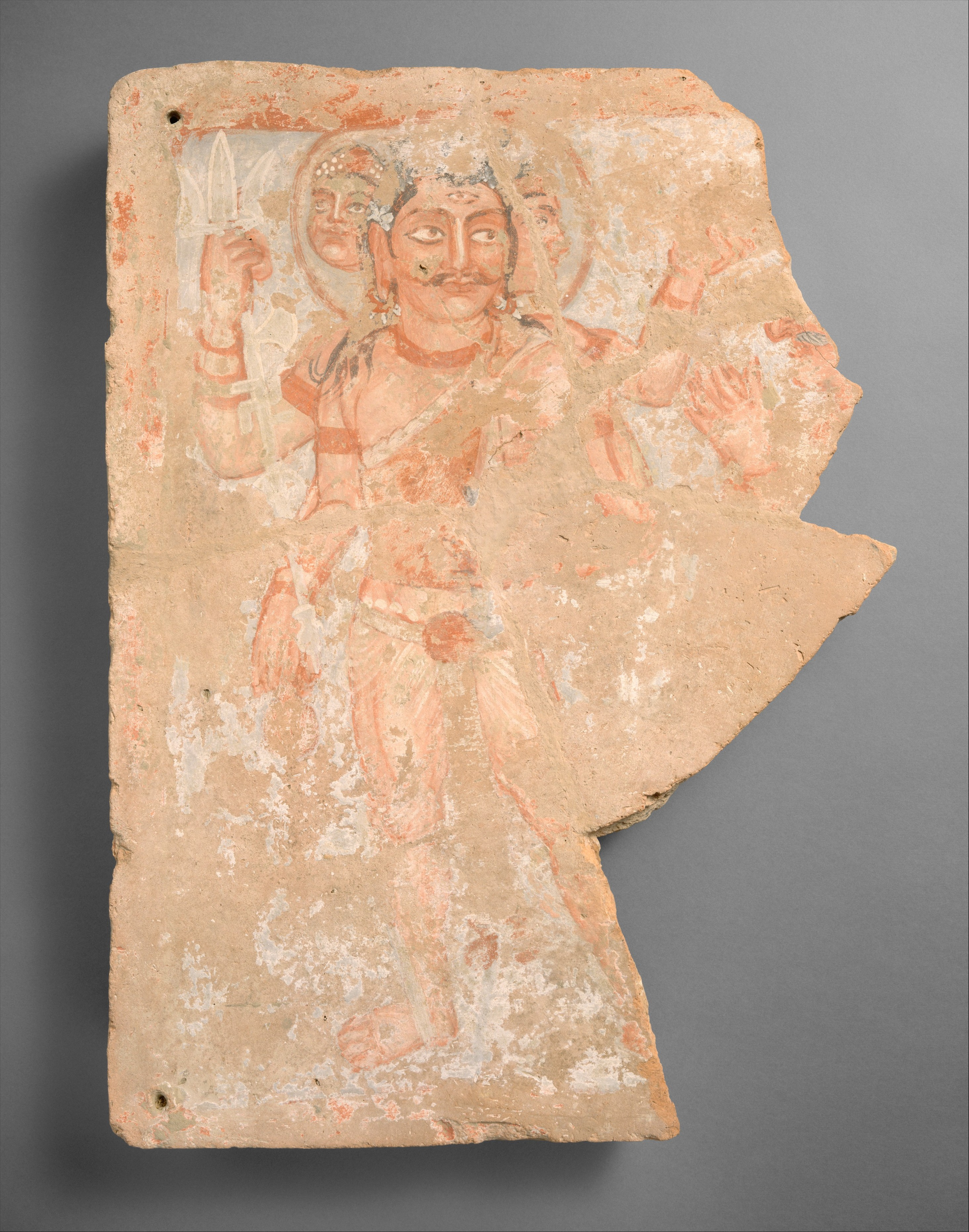
Shiva-Oesho wall painting with fragment of a worshipper, Bactria, 3rd century AD.
Deities on Kushan coinage and seals

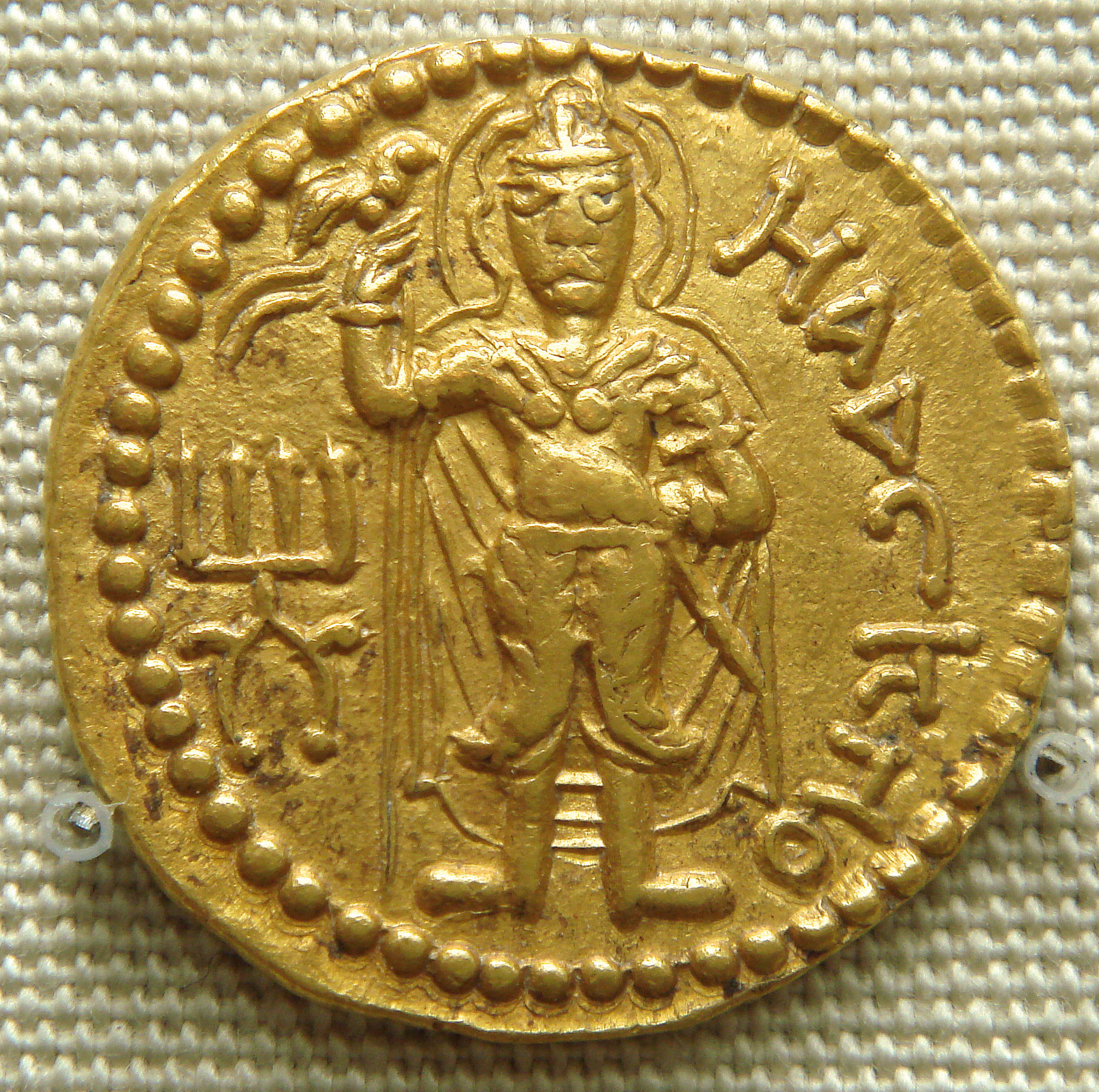
Mahasena on a coin of Huvishka

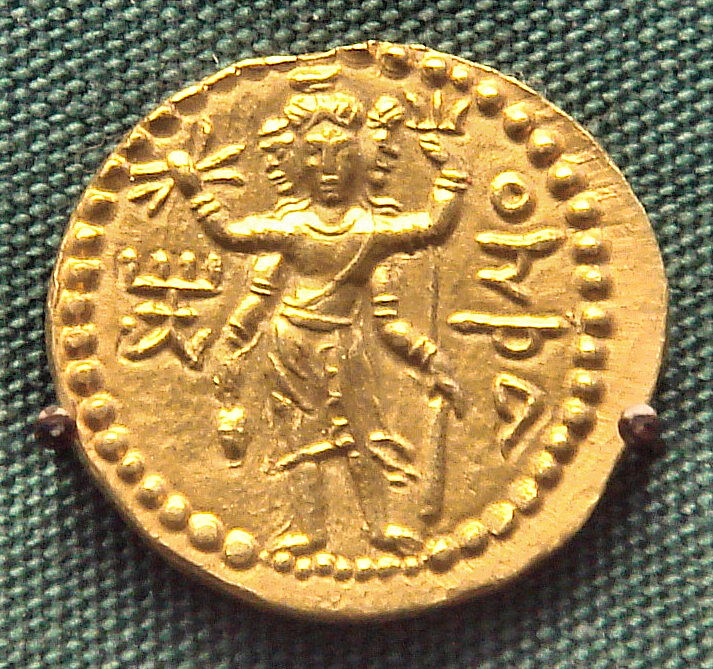
Four-faced Oesho

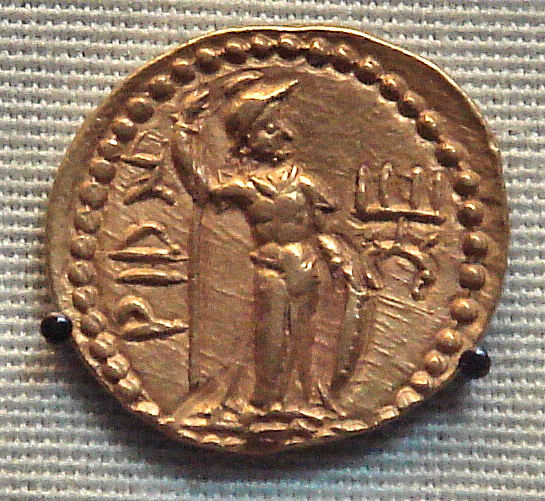
Rishti or Riom

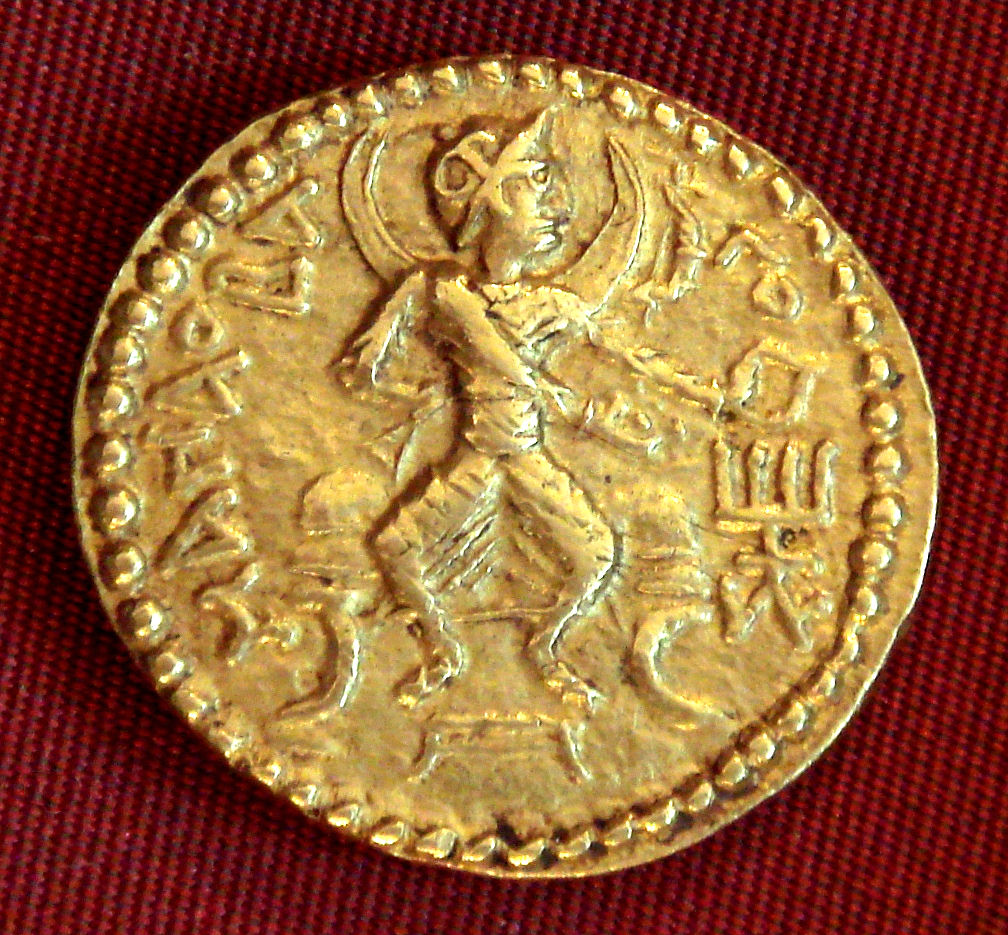
Manaobago

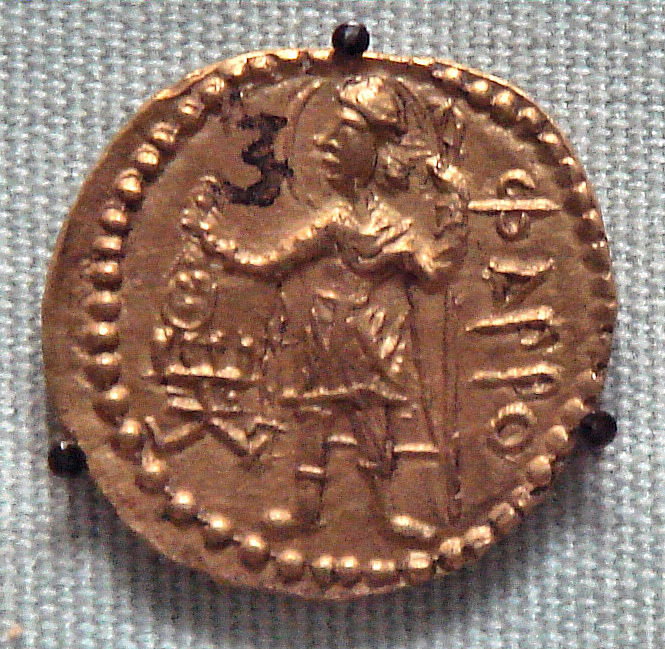
Pharro

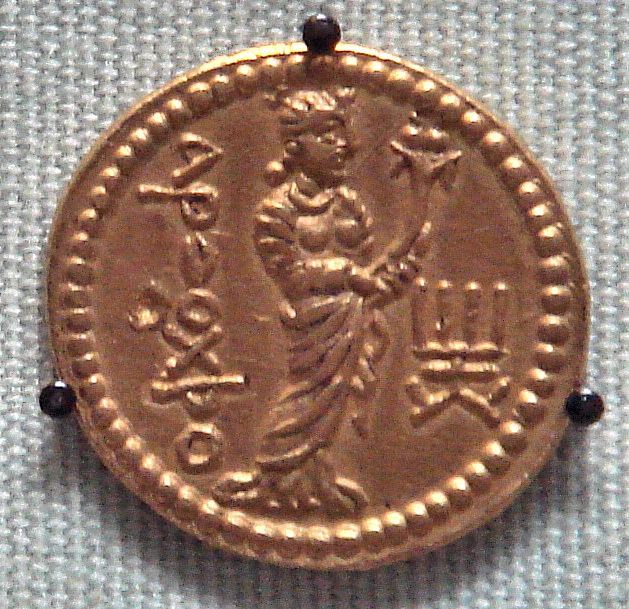
Ardochsho

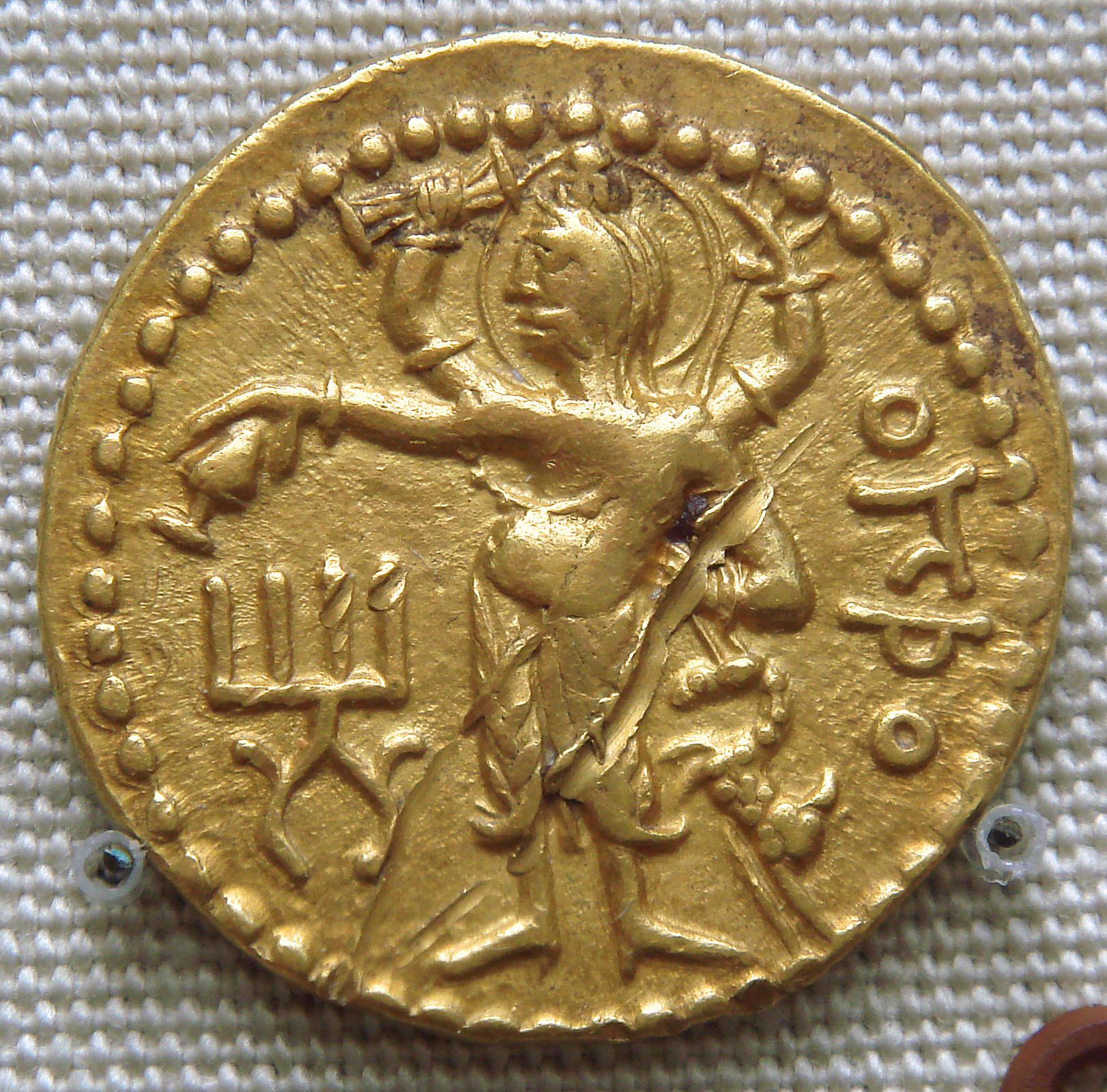
Oesho or Shiva

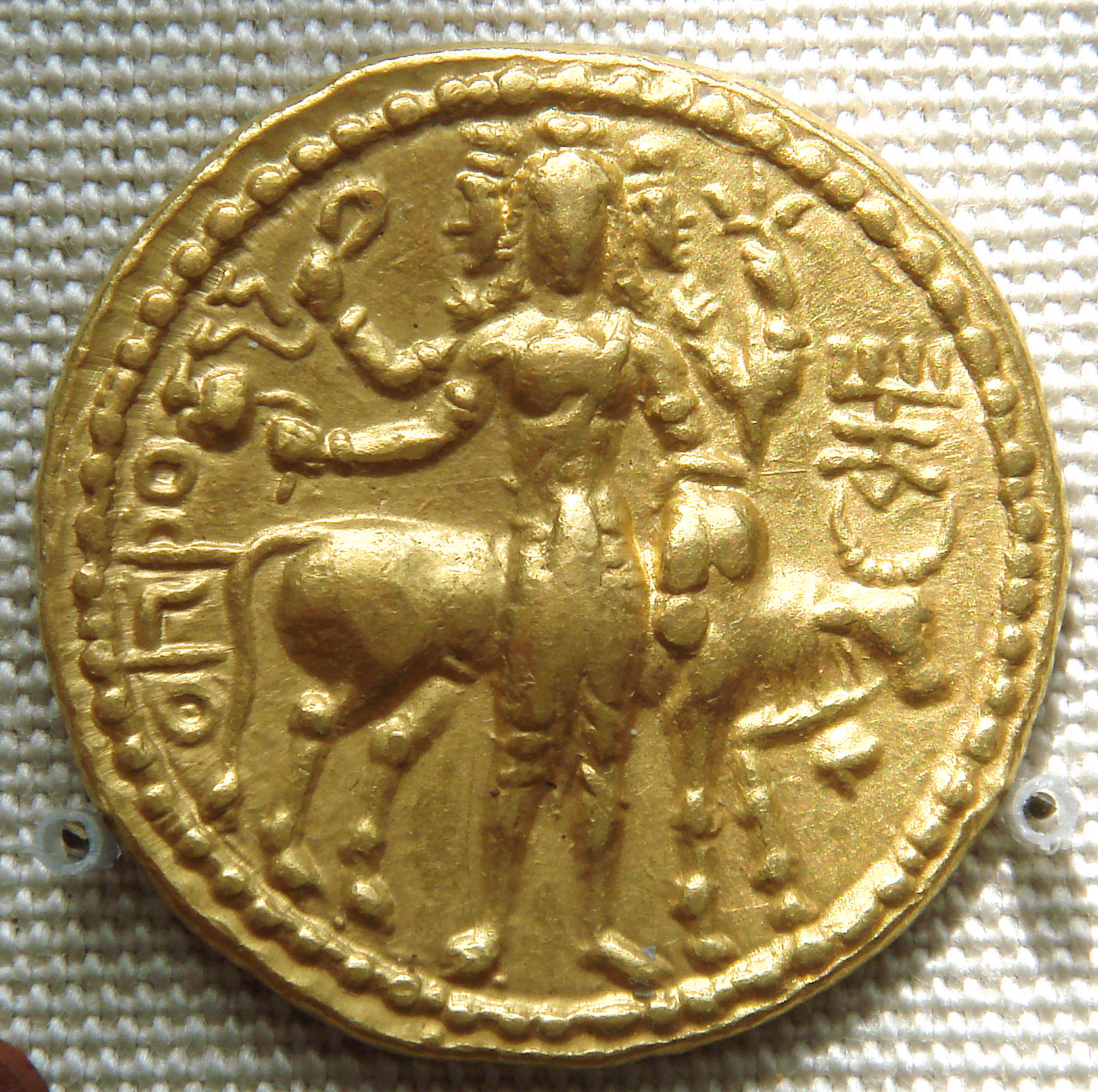
Oesho or Shiva with bull

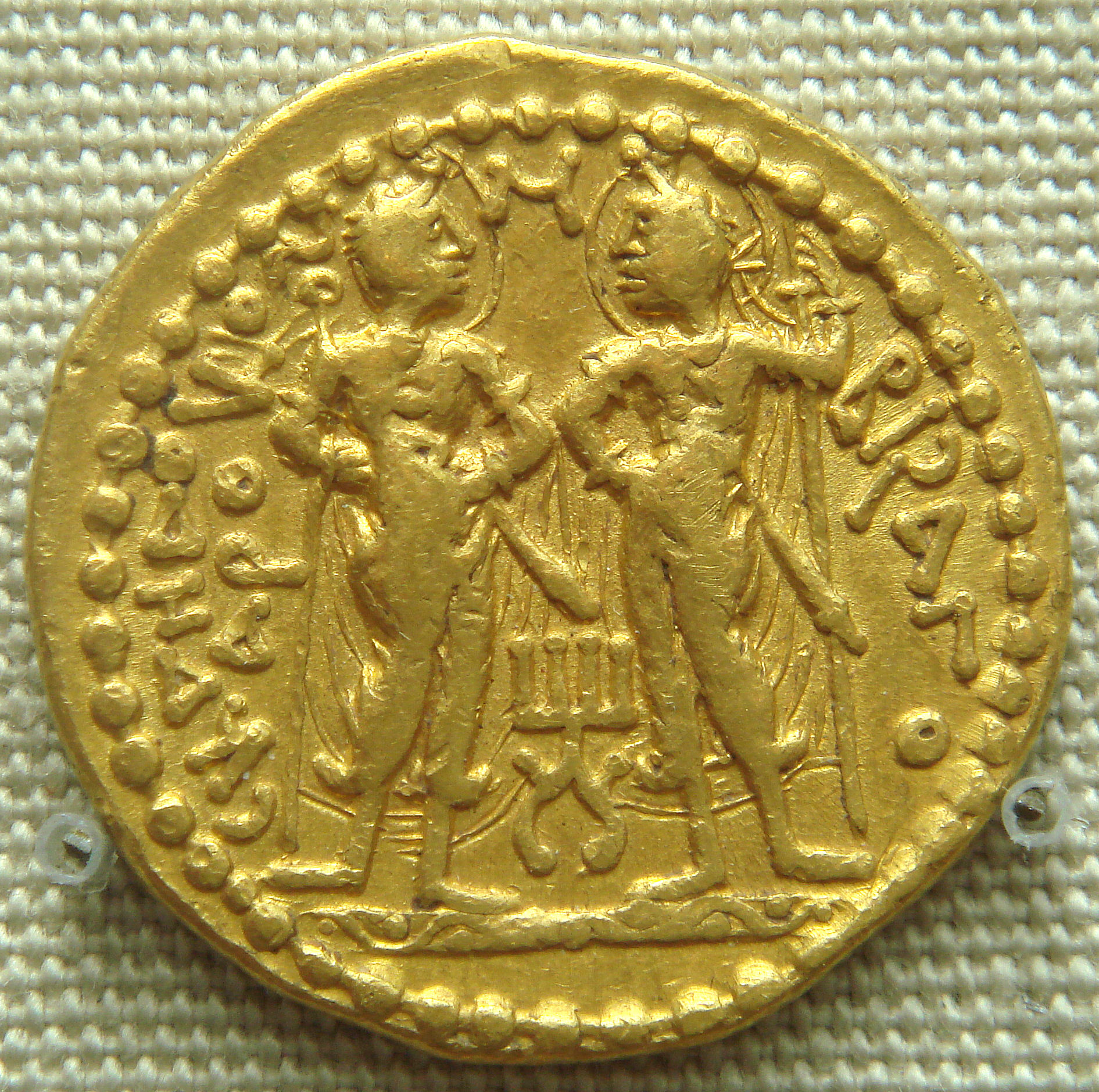
Skanda and Visakha

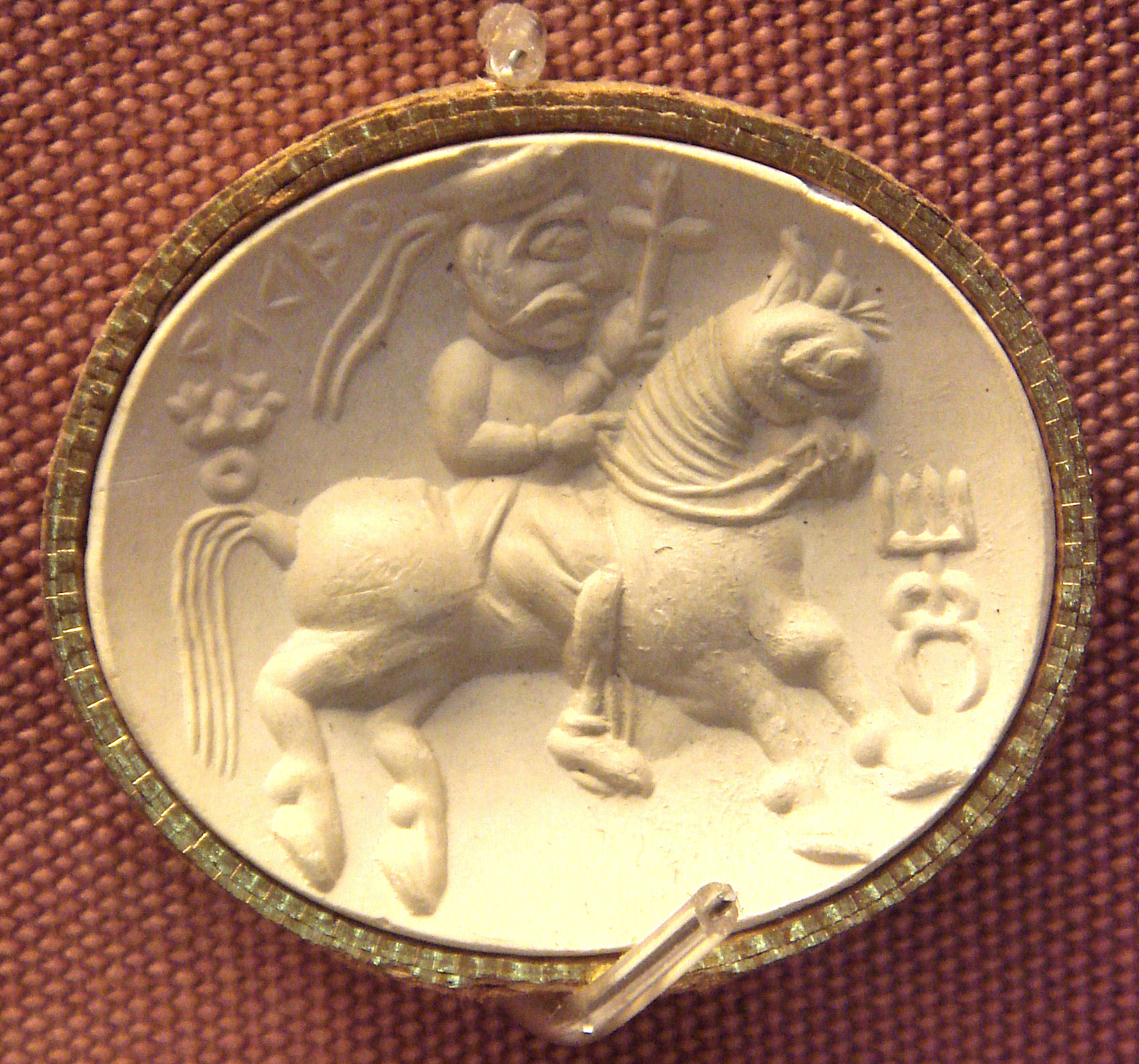
Kushan Carnelian seal representing the "ΑΔϷΟ" (adsho Atar), with triratana symbol left, and Kanishka the Great's dynastic mark right

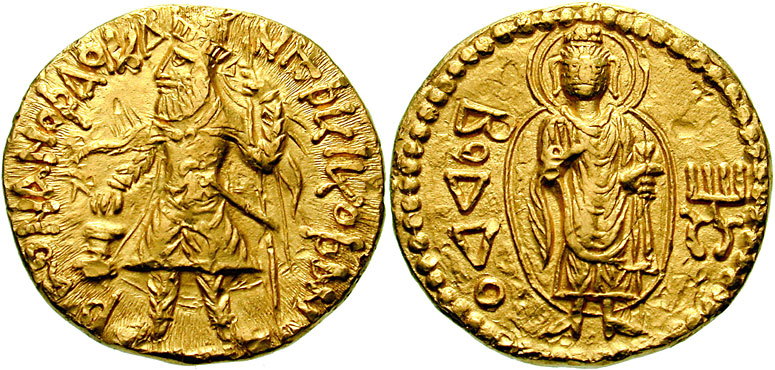
Coin of Kanishka I, with a depiction of the Buddha and legend "Boddo" in Greek script

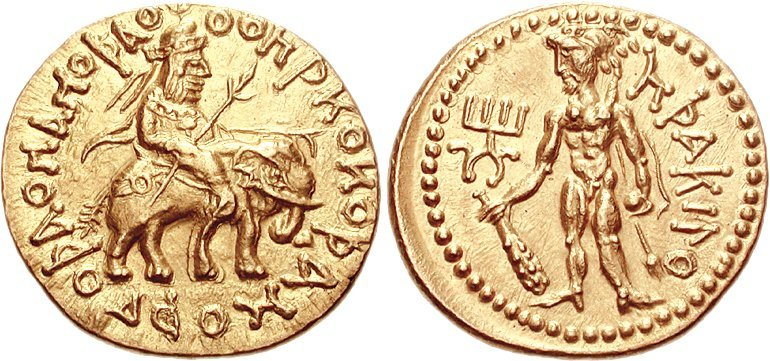
Herakles.

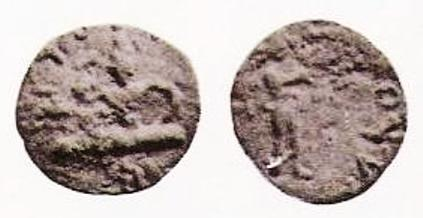
Buddha

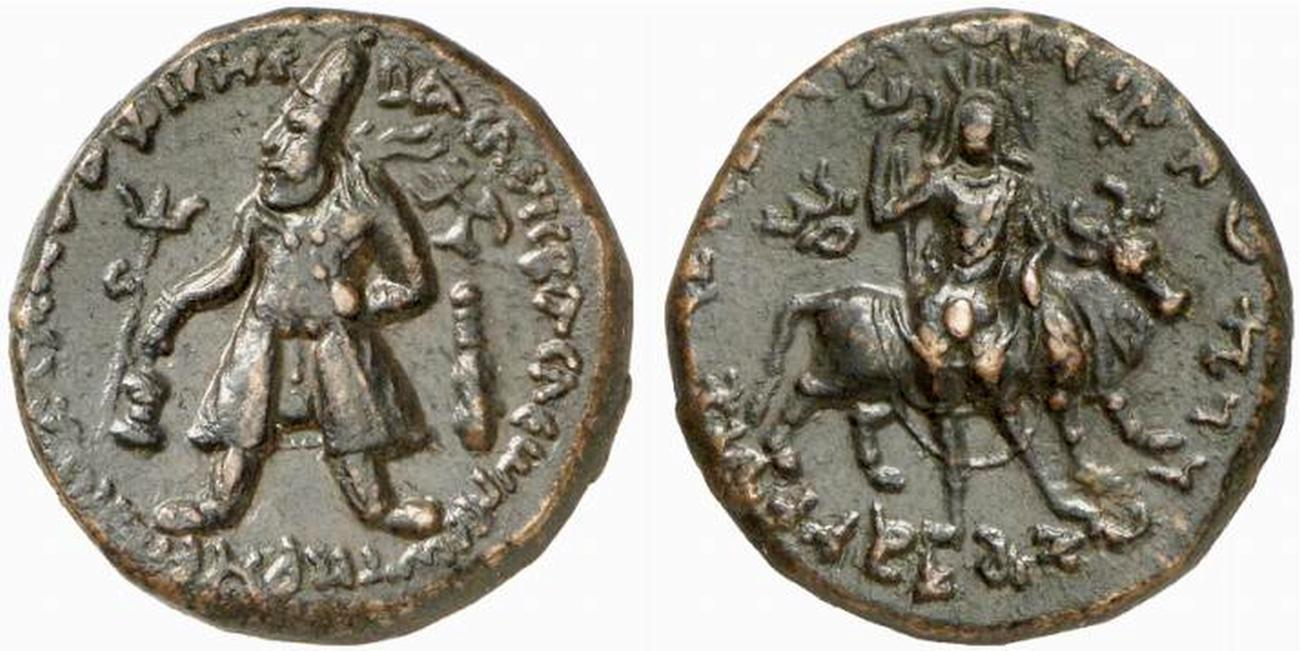
Coin of Vima Kadphises. Deity Oesho on the reverse, thought to be Shiva, or the Zoroastrian Vayu.

=== Buddhism ===
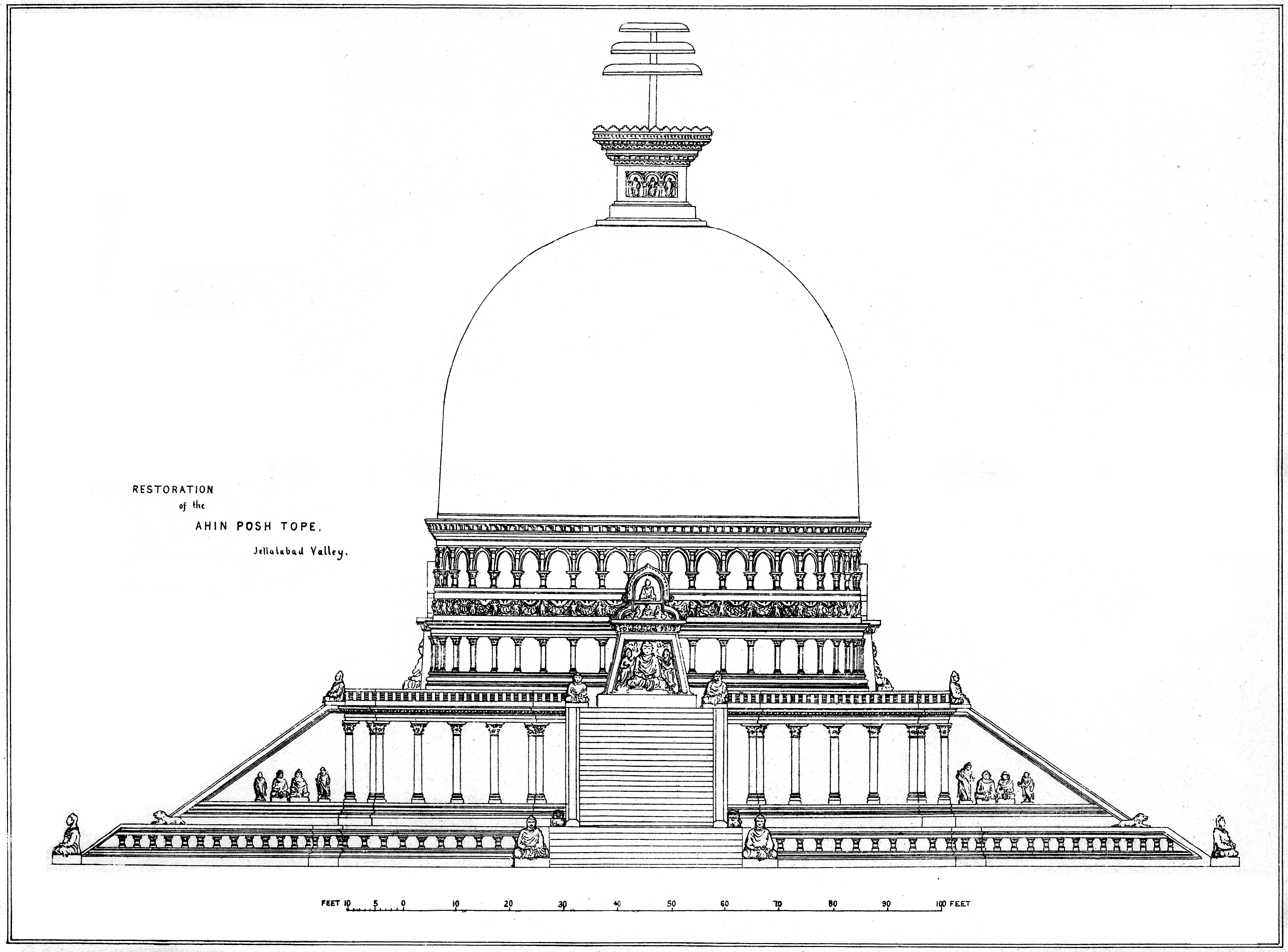
The Ahin Posh stupa was dedicated in the 2nd century AD under the Kushans, and contained coins of Kushan and Roman Emperors.

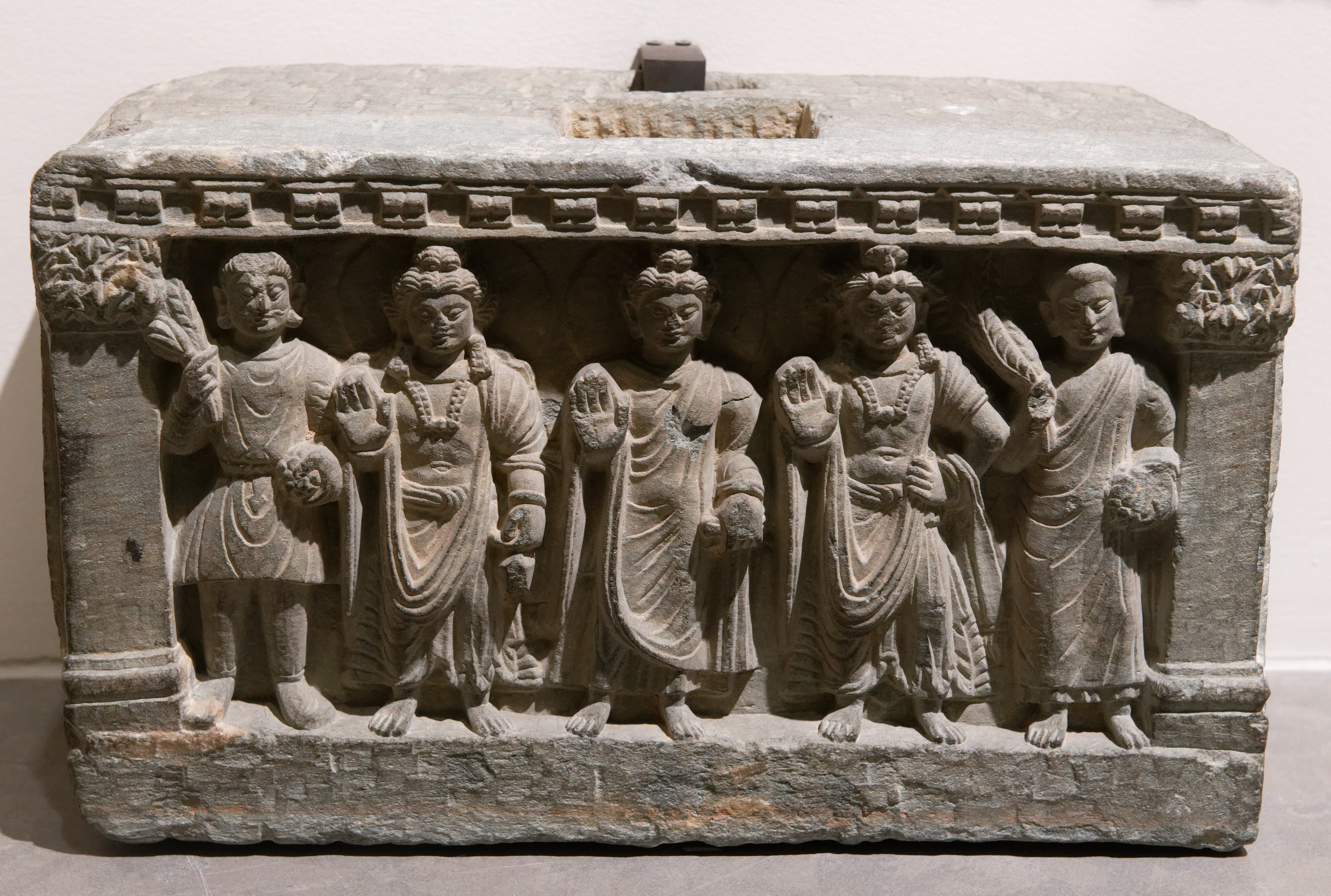
Early Mahayana Buddhist triad. From left to right, a Kushan devotee, Maitreya, the Buddha, Avalokitesvara, and a Buddhist monk. 2nd–3rd century, Shotorak.

The Kushans inherited the Greco-Buddhist traditions of the Indo-Greek Kingdom they replaced, and their patronage of Buddhist institutions allowed them to grow as a commercial power. Between the mid-1st century and the mid-3rd century, Buddhism, patronised by the Kushans, extended to China and other Asian countries through the Silk Road. Kanishka in particular is well-known in Buddhist tradition for having convened a great Buddhist council in Kashmir.

During the 1st century AD, Buddhist books were being produced and carried by monks, and their trader patrons. Also, monasteries were being established along these land routes that went from China and other parts of Asia. With the development of Buddhist books, it caused a new written language called Gandhara. Gandhara consists of eastern Afghanistan and northern Pakistan. Scholars are said to have found many Buddhist scrolls that contained the Gandhari language.

The reign of Huvishka corresponds to the first known epigraphic evidence of the Buddha Amitabha, on the bottom part of a 2nd-century statue which has been found in Govindo-Nagar, and now at the Mathura Museum. The statue is dated to "the 28th year of the reign of Huvishka", and dedicated to "Amitabha Buddha" by a family of merchants. There is also some evidence that Huvishka himself was a follower of Mahayana Buddhism. A Sanskrit manuscript fragment in the Schøyen Collection describes Huvishka as one who has "set forth in the Mahāyāna."

The 12th century historical chronicle Rajatarangini mentions in detail the rule of the Kushan kings and their benevolence towards Buddhism:

Then there ruled in this very land the founders of cities called after their own appellations the three kings named Huska, Juska and Kaniska (...) These kings albeit belonging to the Turkish race found refuge in acts of piety; they constructed in Suskaletra and other places monasteries, Caityas and similar edificies. During the glorious period of their regime the kingdom of Kashmir was for the most part an appanage of the Buddhists who had acquired lustre by renunciation. At this time since the Nirvana of the blessed Sakya Simha in this terrestrial world one hundred fifty years, it is said, had elapsed. And a Bodhisattva was in this country the sole supreme ruler of the land; he was the illustrious Nagarjuna who dwelt in Sadarhadvana.

— Rajatarangini (I168-I173)

== Art and architecture ==
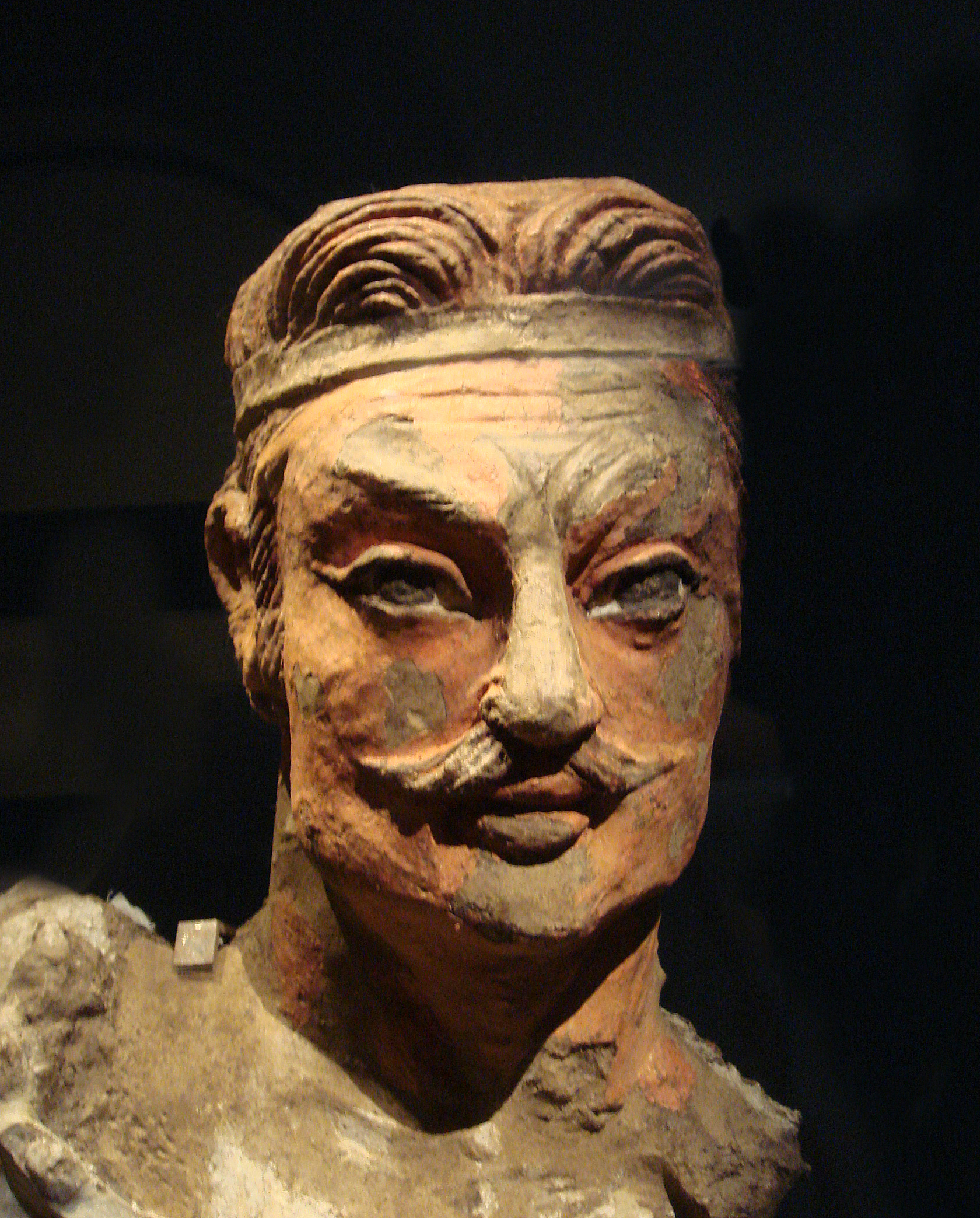
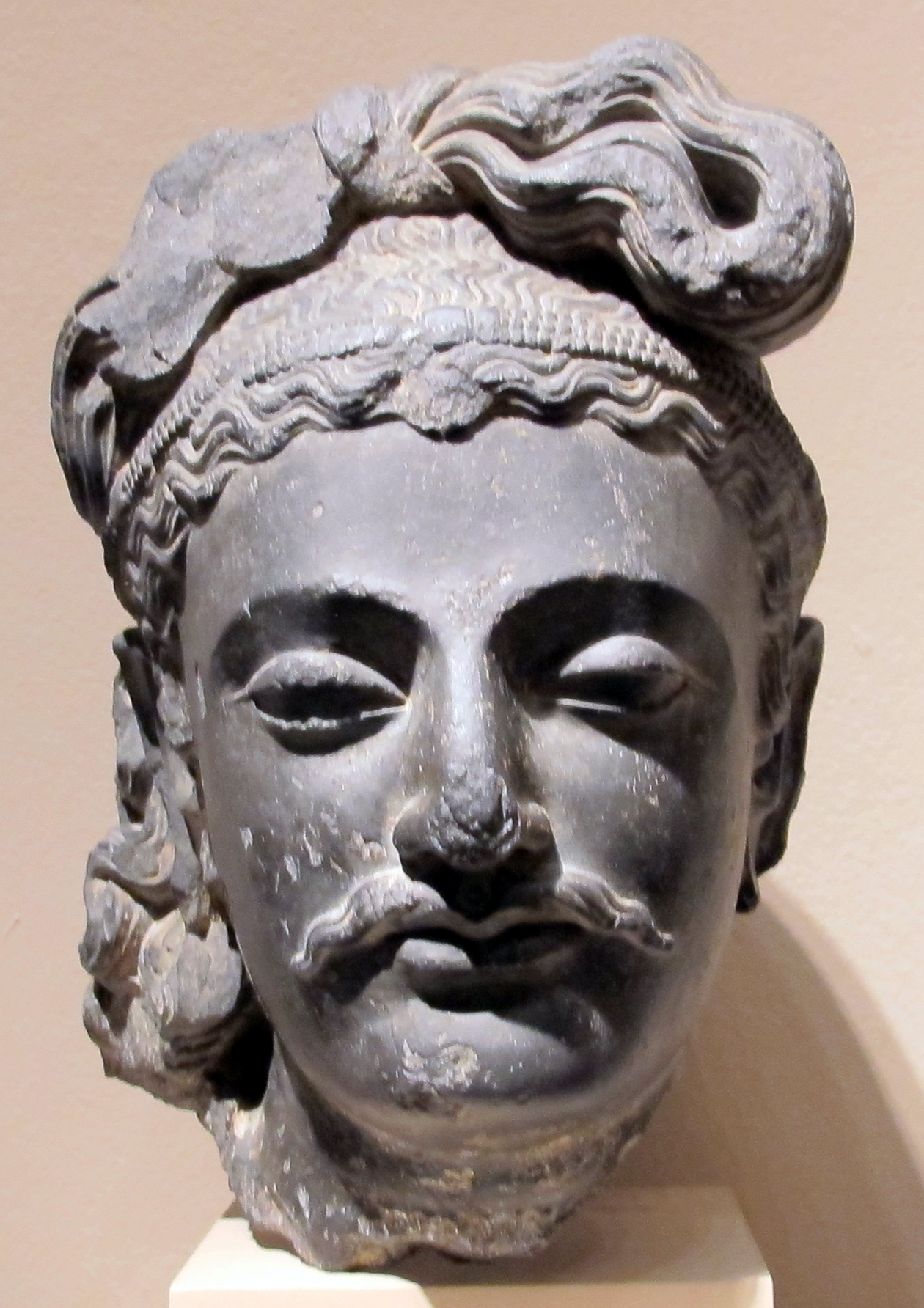
Portrait of a Kushan prince from Khalchayan (left), and head of a Gandhara Bodhisattava (right), said to have similar characteristics (Philadelphia Museum of Art).

The art and culture of Gandhara, at the crossroads of the Kushan hegemony, developed the traditions of Greco-Buddhist art and are the best known expressions of Kushan influences to Westerners. Several direct depictions of Kushans are known from Gandhara, where they are represented with a tunic, belt and trousers and play the role of devotees to the Buddha, as well as the Bodhisattva and future Buddha Maitreya.

According to Benjamin Rowland, the first expression of Kushan art appears at Khalchayan at the end of the 2nd century BC. It is derived from Hellenistic art, and possibly from the art of the cities of Ai-Khanoum and Nysa, and clearly has similarities with the later Art of Gandhara, and may even have been at the origin of its development. Rowland particularly draws attention to the similarity of the ethnic types represented at Khalchayan and in the art of Gandhara, and also in the style of portraiture itself. For example, Rowland find a great proximity between the famous head of a Yuezhi prince from Khalchayan, and the head of Gandharan Bodhisattvas, giving the example of the Gandharan head of a Bodhisattva in the Philadelphia Museum of Art. The similarity of the Gandhara Bodhisattva with the portrait of the Kushan ruler Heraios is also striking. According to Rowland the Bactrian art of Khalchayan thus survived for several centuries through its influence in the art of Gandhara, thanks to the patronage of the Kushans.

During the Kushan Empire, many images of Gandhara share a strong resemblance to the features of Greek, Syrian, Persian and Indian figures. These Western-looking stylistic signatures often include heavy drapery and curly hair representing a composite.

As the Kushans took control of the area of Mathura as well, the Art of Mathura developed considerably, and free-standing statues of the Buddha came to be mass-produced around this time, possibly encouraged by doctrinal changes in Buddhism allowing to depart from the aniconism that had prevailed in the Buddhist sculptures at Mathura, Bharhut or Sanchi from the end of the 2nd century BC. The artistic cultural influence of kushans declined slowly due to Hellenistic Greek and Indian influences.

Dated Buddhist statuary under the Kushans

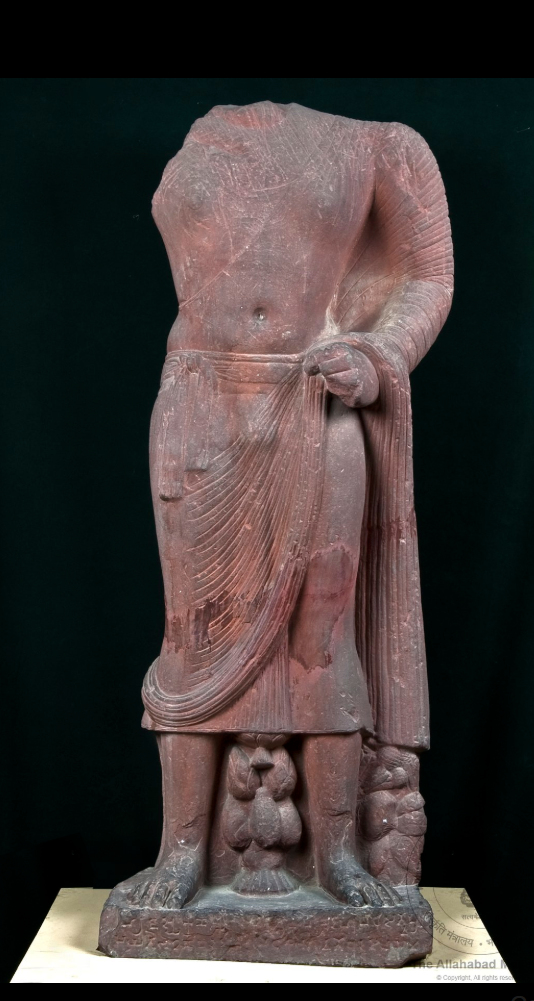
Kanishka I:
Kosambi Bodhisattva, inscribed "Year 2 of Kanishka" (AD 129).

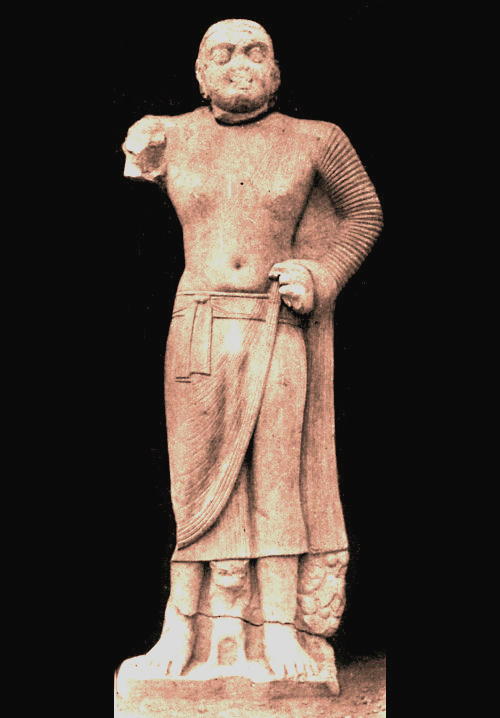
Kanishka I:
Bala Bodhisattva, Sarnath, inscribed "Year 3 of Kanishka" (AD 130).

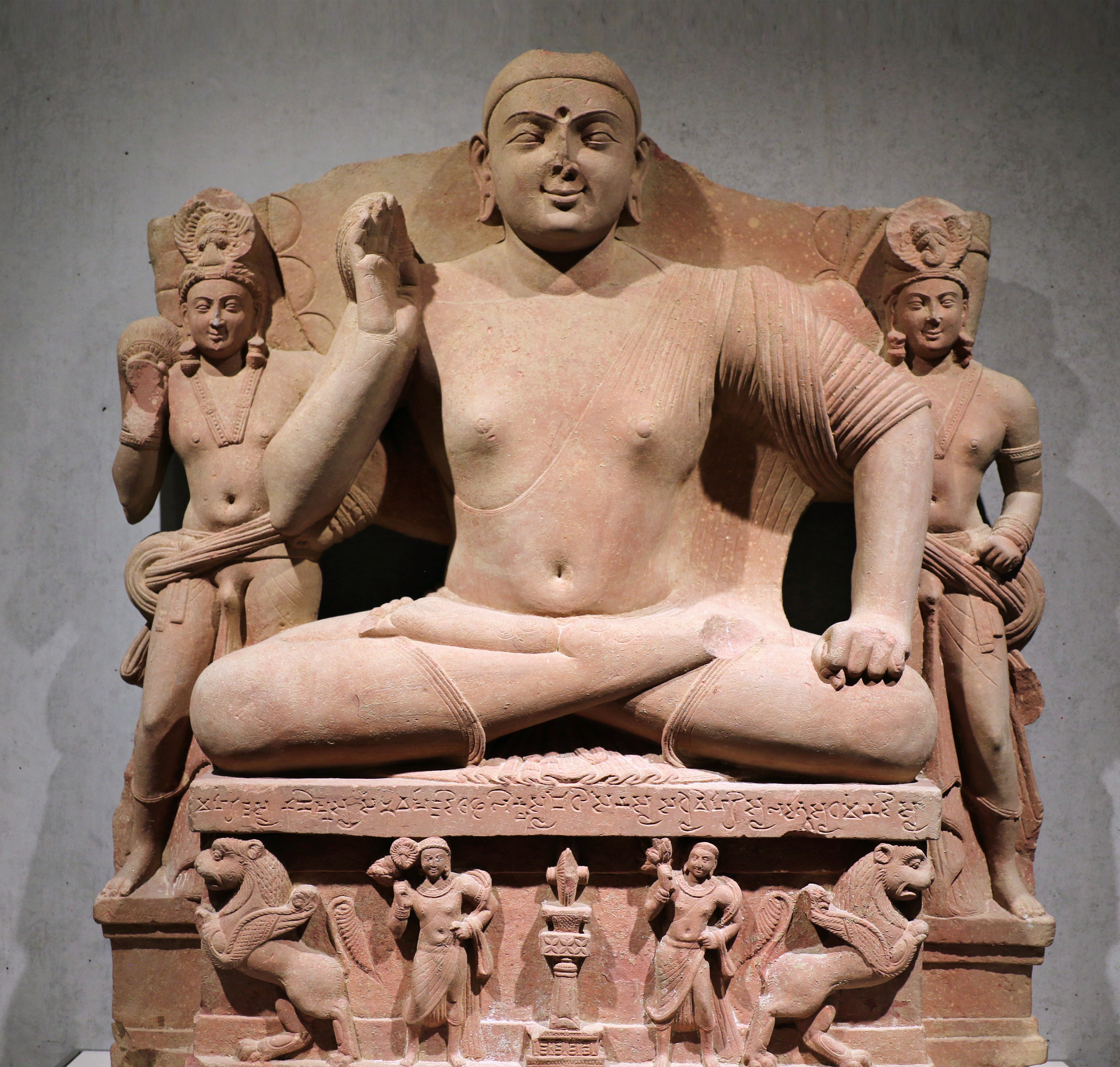
Kanishka I:
Kimbell seated Bodhisattva, with inscription "Year 4 of Kanishka" (AD 131). (Note: Seated Buddha with inscription starting with 𑁕 Maharajasya Kanishkasya Sam 4 "Year 4 of the Great King Kanishka".) Another similar statue has "Year 32 of Kanishka".

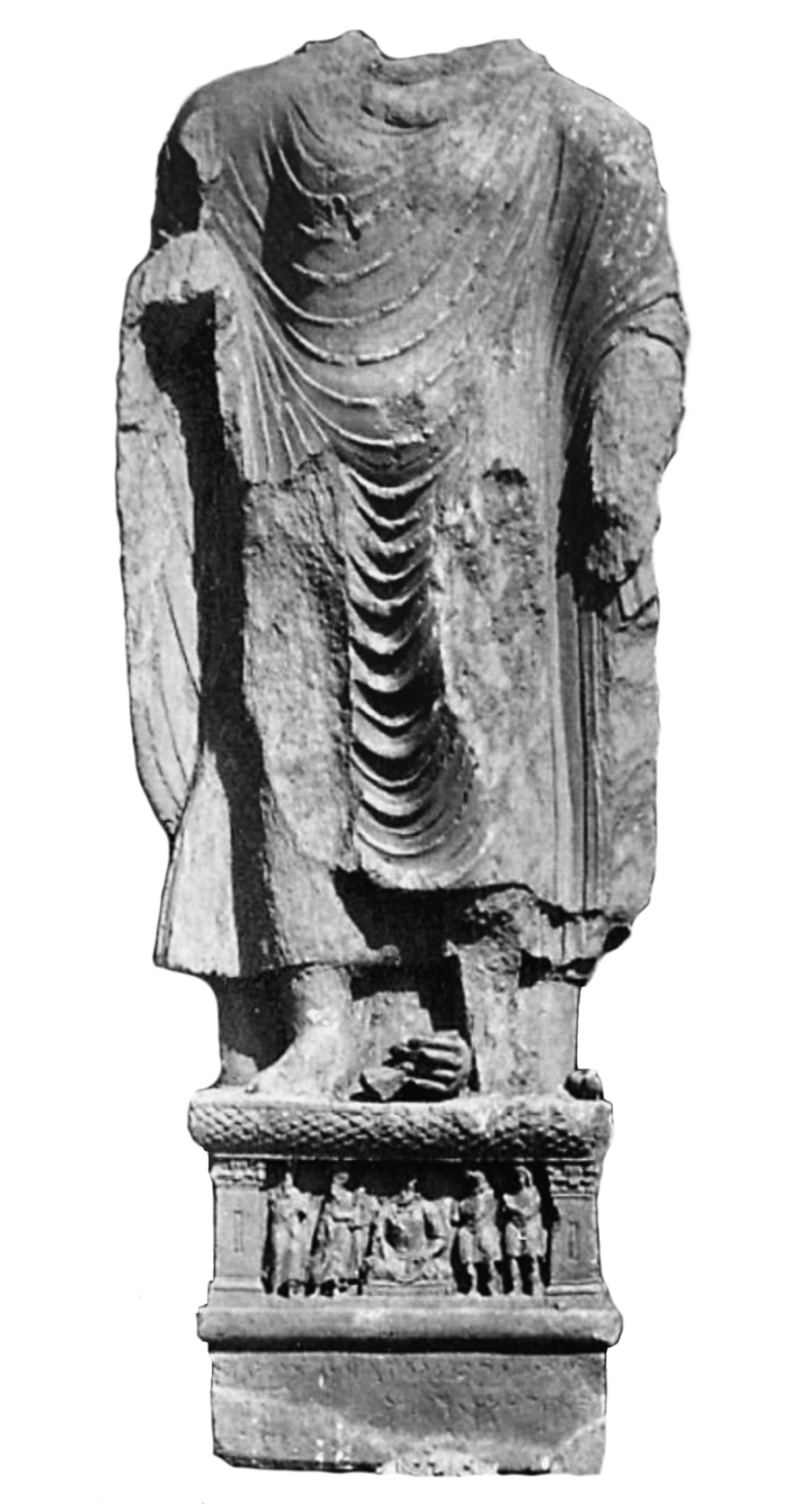
Kanishka I:
Buddha from Loriyan Tangai with inscription mentioning the "year 318" of the Yavana era (AD 143).

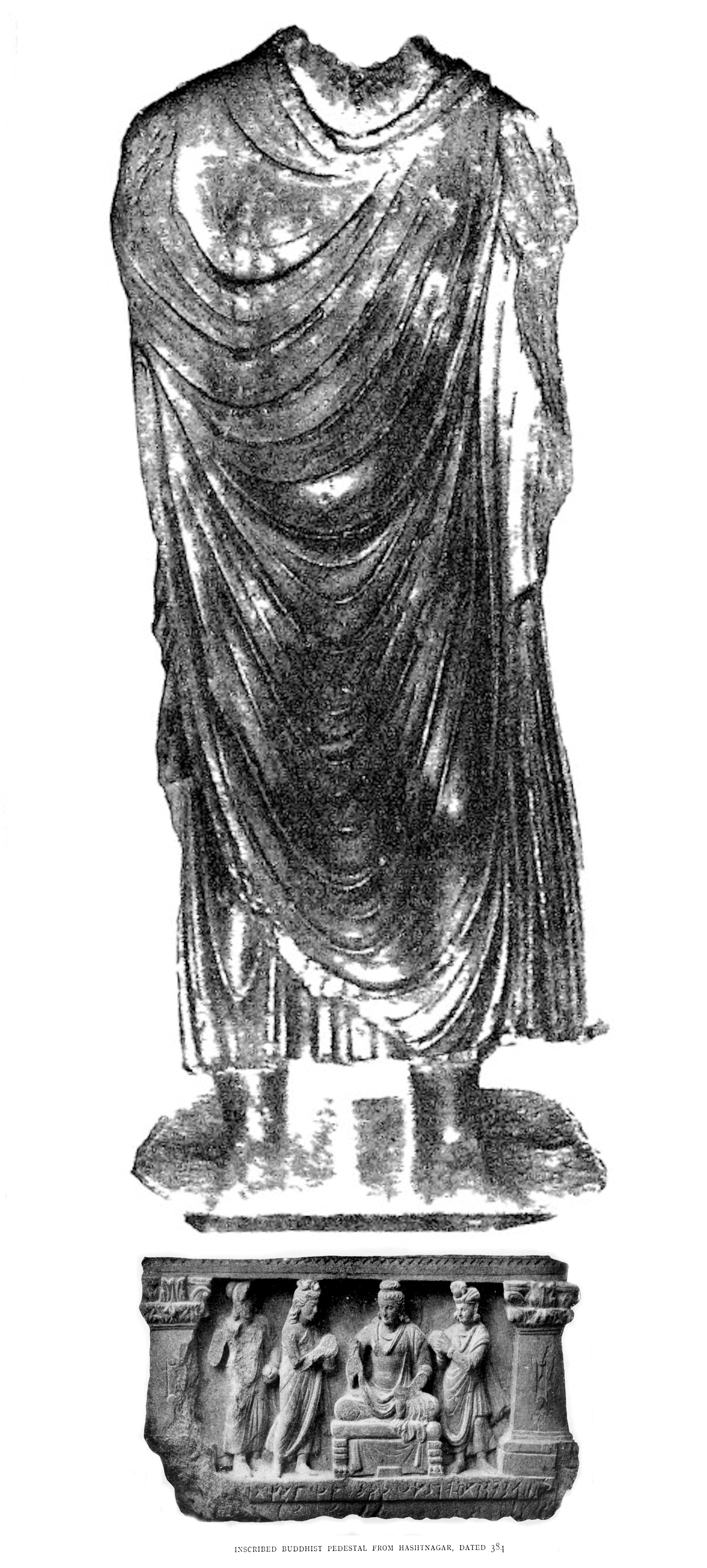
Vasudeva I:
Hashtnagar Buddha and its piedestal, inscribed with "year 384" of the Yavana era (c. AD 209).

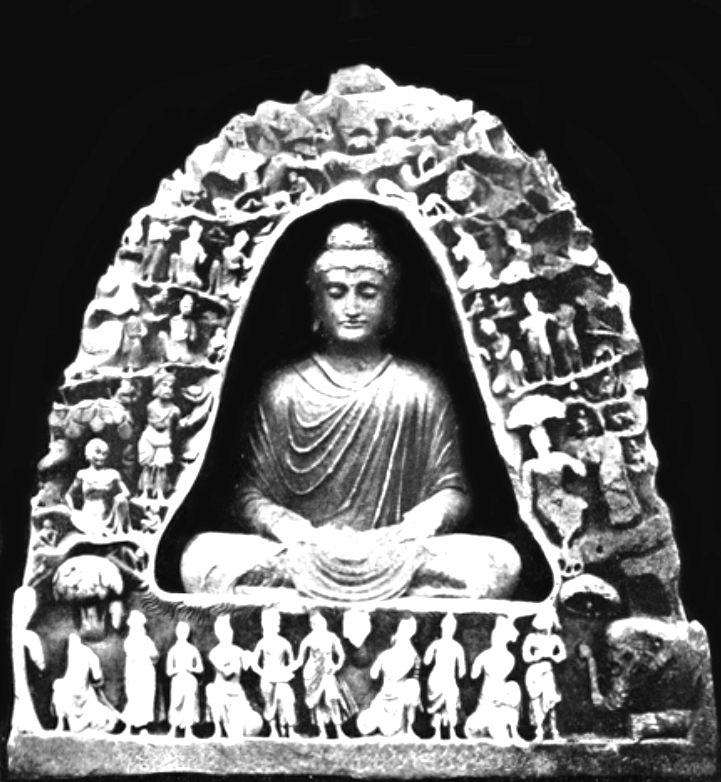
Vasudeva I:
Mamane Dheri Buddha, inscribed with "Year 89", probably of the Kanishka era (AD 216).

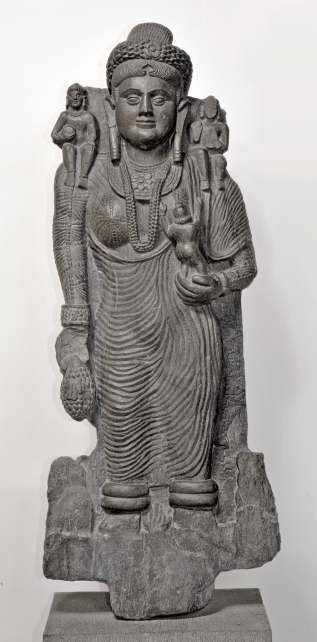
Kanishka II:
Statue of Hariti from Skarah Dheri, Gandhara, "Year 399" of the Yavana era (AD 244).

=== Kushan monetary system ===
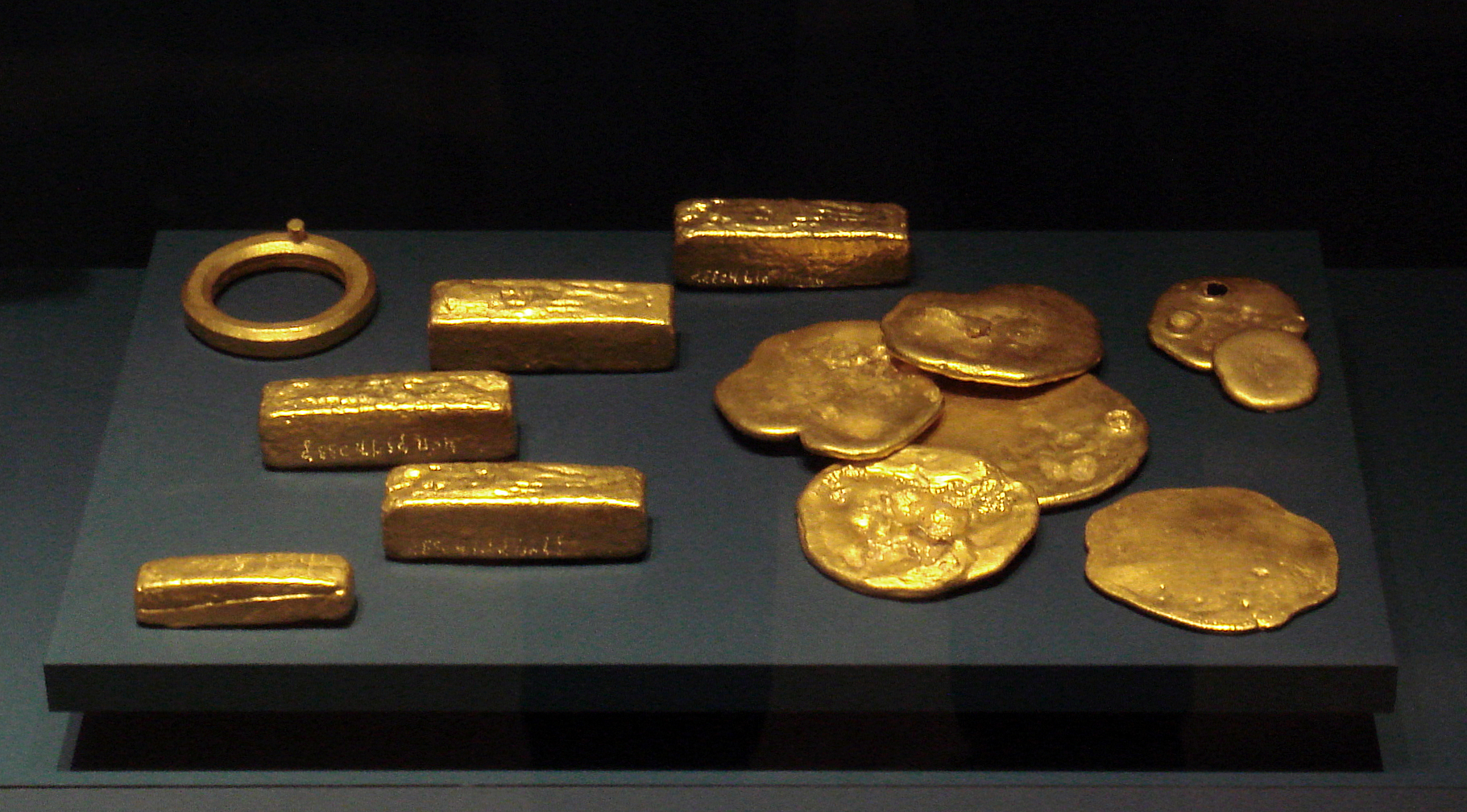
Kushan gold ingots, from the Dalverzin Tepe treasure, 1st century CE

The Kushans used gold ingots as part of their monetary system, as shown by the gold treasure discovered in 1972 in Dalverzin Tepe. The main objects from the treasure were circular and parallelepipedic ingots, followed by various decorative objects and jewellery items. The circular ingots used to be progressively cut up as needed, depending on the amount required for a transaction. On the contrary, the parallelepipedic ingots were used to stock wealth in a not-divisible form; these ingots bear inscriptions in Kharosthi mentioning their weight and the god Mitra (protector of contractual relations) These ingots are all attributed to the monetary system of the Kushan Empire.

The coinage of the Kushans was abundant and an important tool of propaganda in promoting each Kushan ruler. One of the names for Kushan coins was Dinara, which ultimately came from the Roman name Denarius aureus. The coinage of the Kushans was copied as far as the Kushano-Sasanians in the west, and the kingdom of Samatata in Bengal to the east. The coinage of the Gupta Empire was also initially derived from the coinage of the Kushan Empire, adopting its weight standard, techniques and designs, following the conquests of Samudragupta in the northwest. The imagery on Gupta coins then became more Indian in both style and subject matter compared to earlier dynasties, where Greco-Roman and Persian styles were mostly followed.

It has long been suggested that the gold contained in Kushan coins was ultimately of Roman origin, and that Roman coins were imported as a consequence of trade and melted in India to mint Kushan coins. However, a recent archaeometallurgical study of trace elements through proton activation analysis has shown that Kushan gold contains high concentrations of platinum and palladium, which rules out the hypothesis of a Roman provenance. To this day, the origin of Kushan gold remains unknown.

=== Kushan fortresses ===
Several Kushan fortresses are known, particularly in Bactria, which were often rebuilt on top of Hellenistic fortifications, as in Kampir Tepe. They are often characterised by arrow-shaped loopholes for archers.

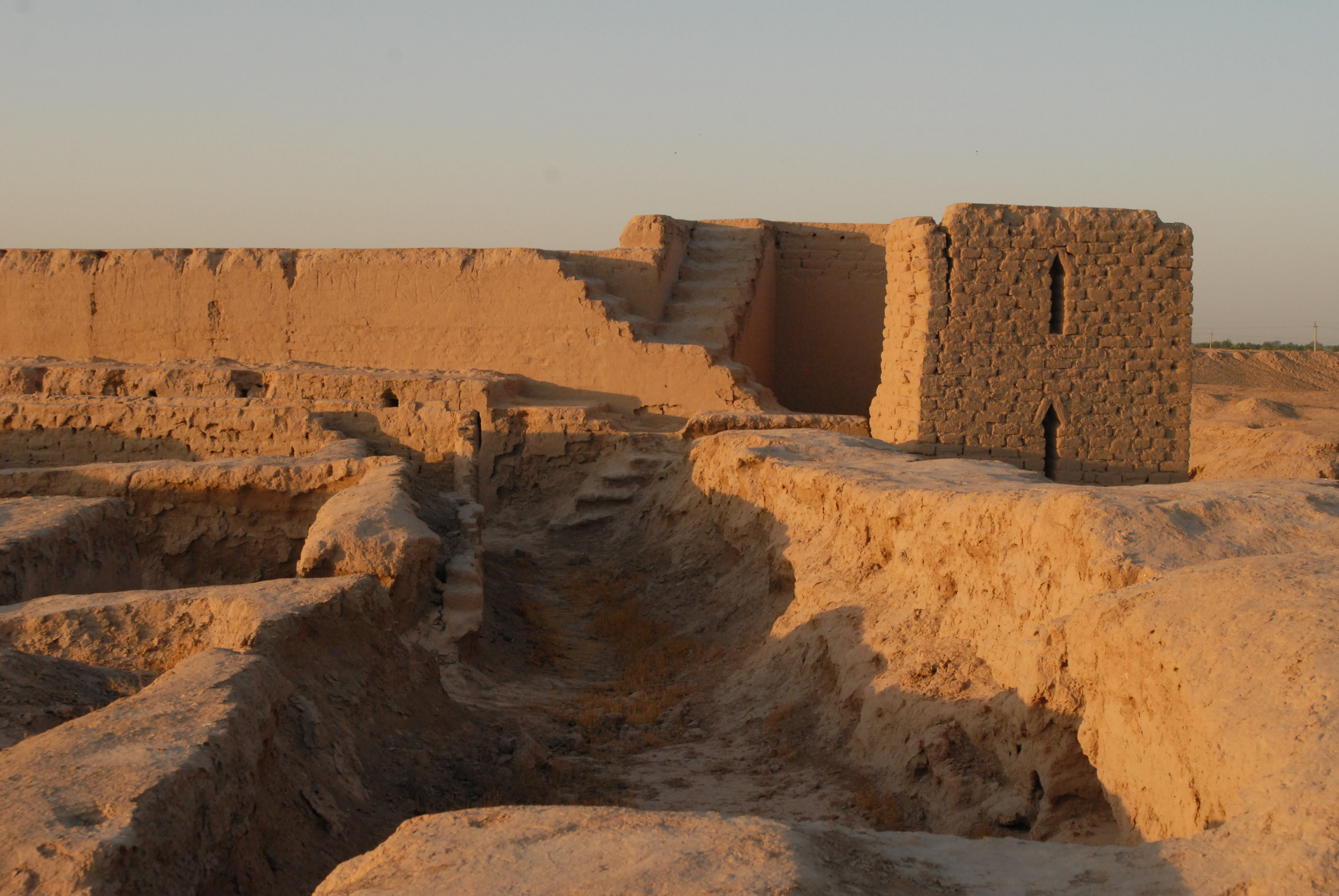
The Kushan fortress of Kampir Tepe

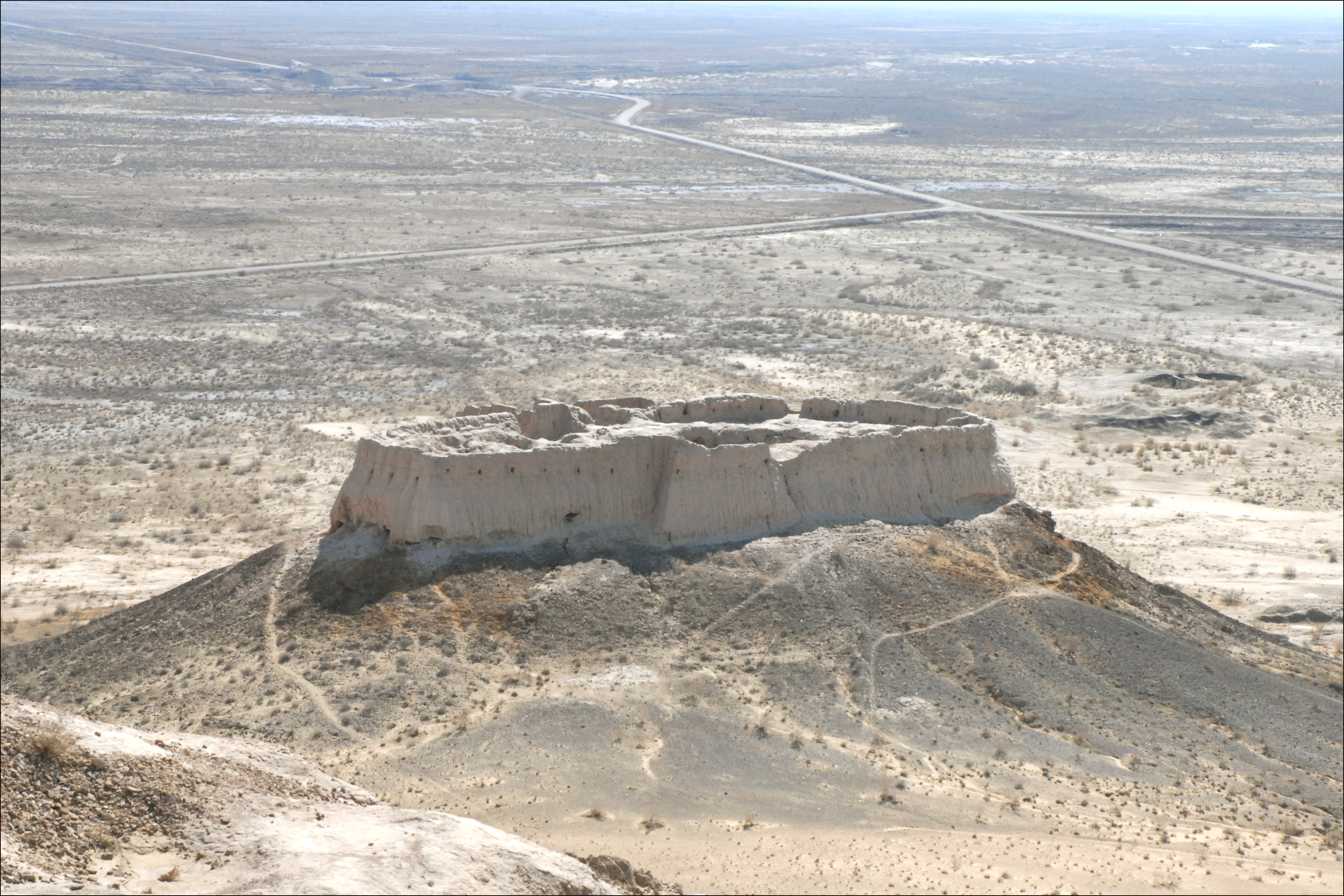
The fortress of Ayaz Kala

The fortress of Shahr-e Zuhak.

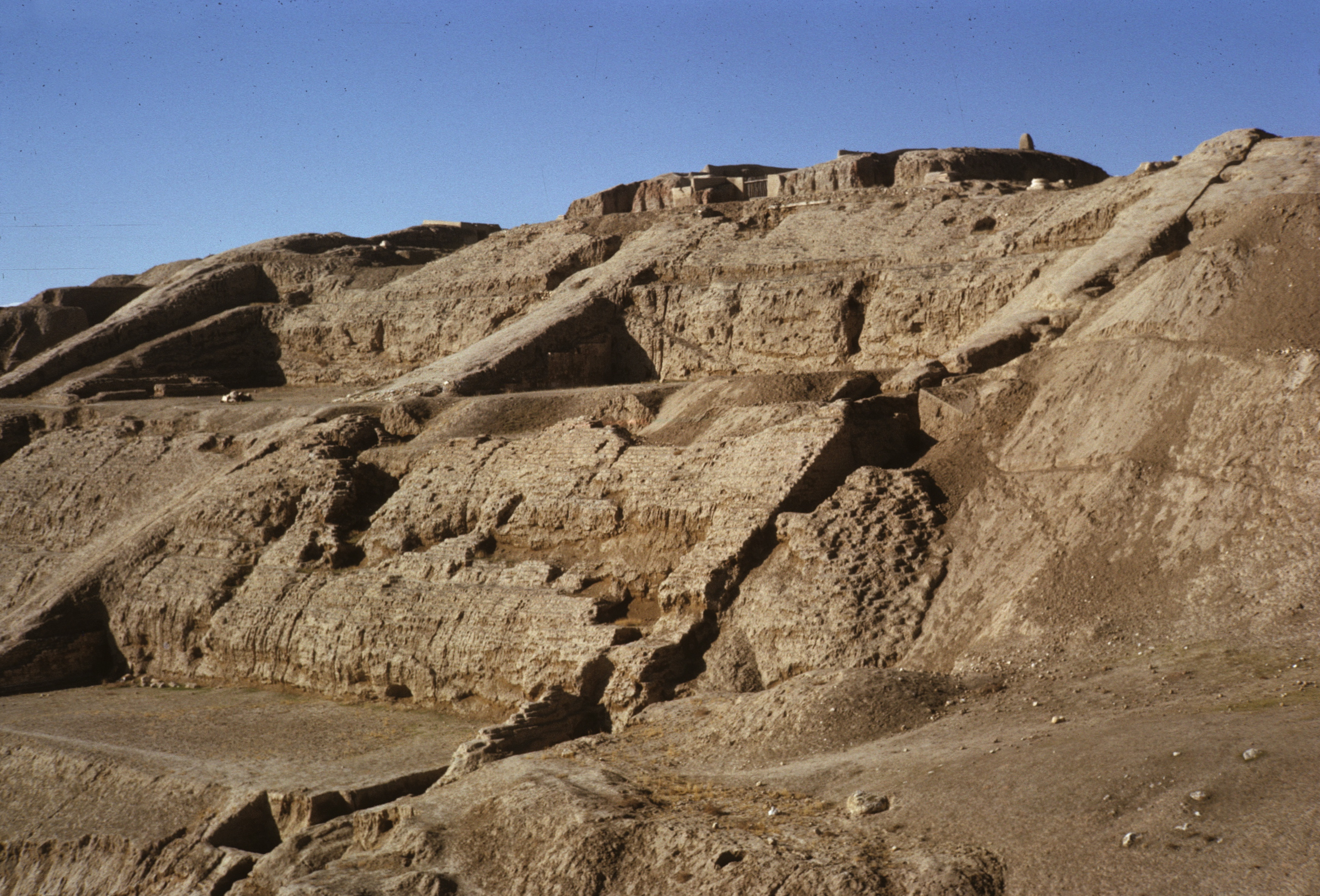
The temple and fortress of Surkh Kotal

== Foreign relations ==
=== Contacts with Rome ===
Roman coinage among the Kushans

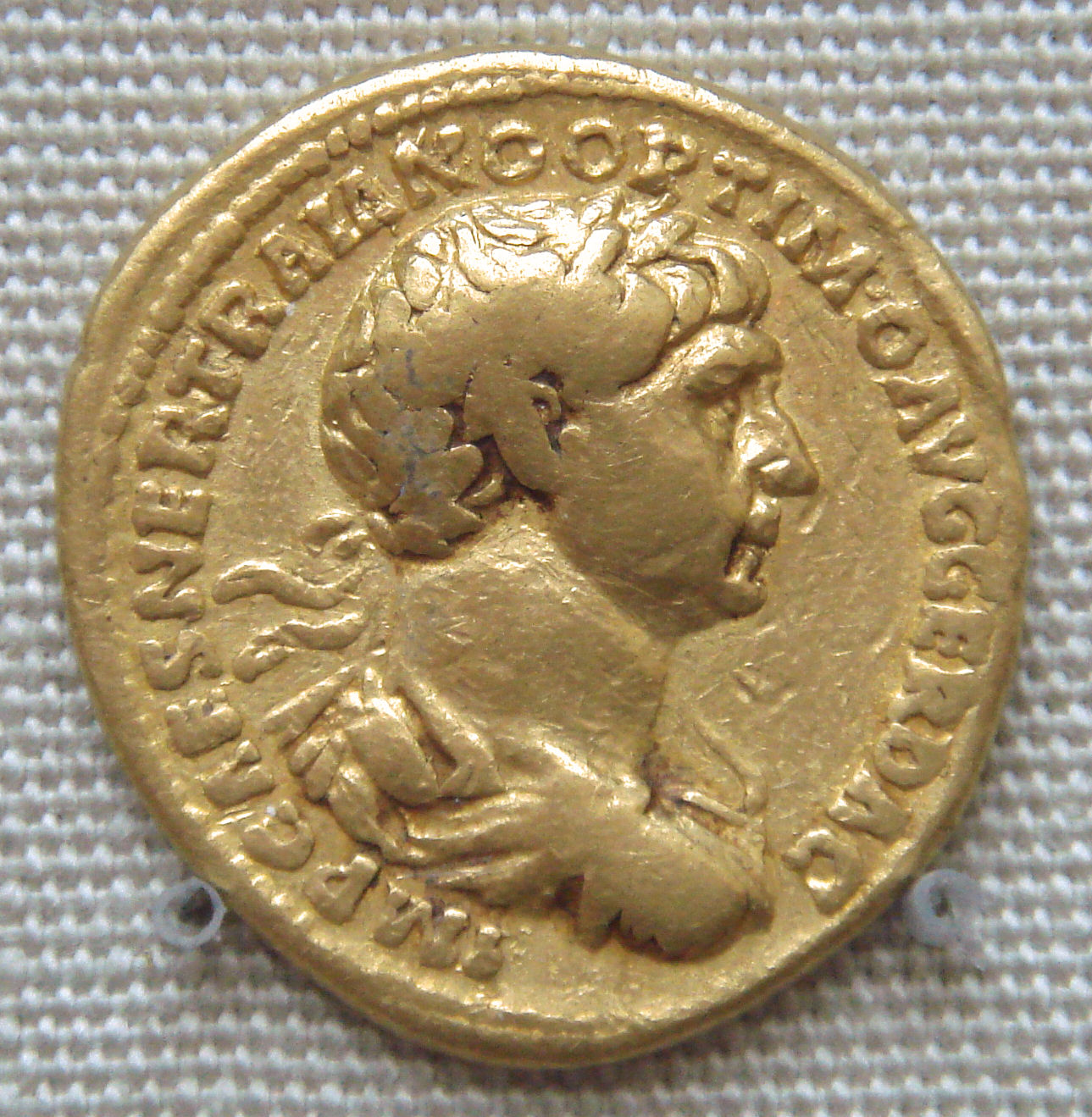
Coin of the Roman Emperor Trajan, found together with coins of Kanishka the Great at the Ahin Posh Monastery

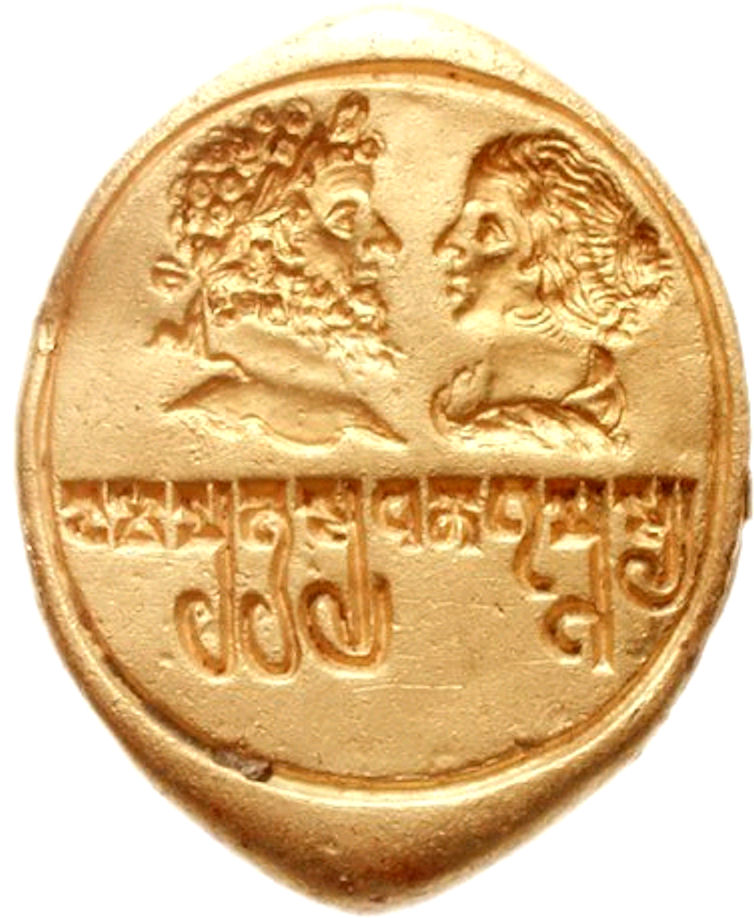
Kushan ring with inscription in the Brahmi script, with portraits of Roman rulers Septimius Severus and Julia Domna

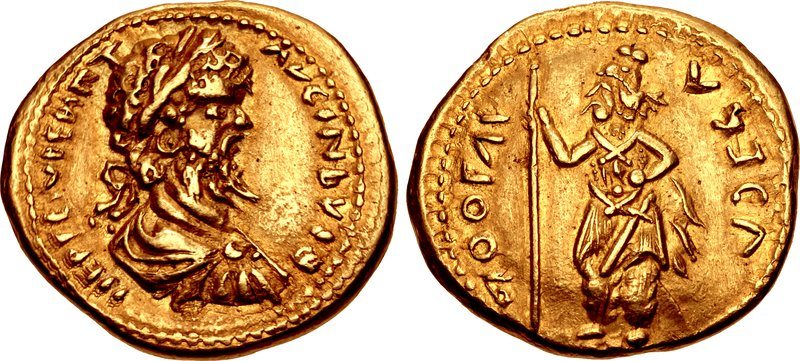
Indian imitation of a coin of Septimius Severus. AD 193–211

Several Roman sources describe the visit of ambassadors from the Kings of Bactria and India during the 2nd century, probably referring to the Kushans. The 2nd century Syrian author Bardesanes calls Kushans (Syriac: ܟܘܫܢܝܐ qåšån) "Bactrians who are called Kushans" in his The Book of the Laws of the Countries and further alleges their luxurious lifestyle and the immoral character of their women.

Historia Augusta, speaking of Emperor Hadrian (117–138) tells:

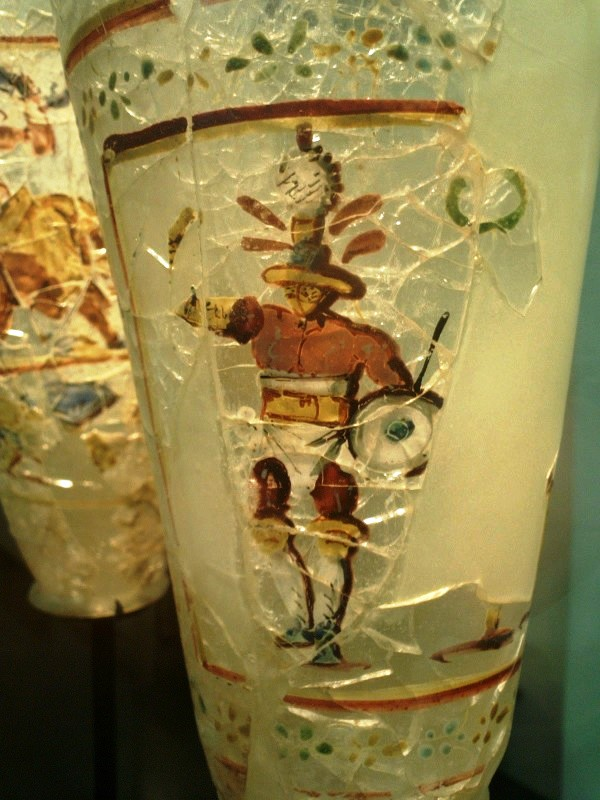
Greco-Roman gladiator on a glass vessel, Kapisa, 2nd century

Reges Bactrianorum legatos ad eum, amicitiae petendae causa, supplices miserunt "The kings of the Bactrians sent supplicant ambassadors to him, to seek his friendship."

Also in 138, according to Aurelius Victor (Epitome‚ XV, 4), and Appian (Praef., 7), Antoninus Pius, successor to Hadrian, received some Indian, Bactrian, and Hyrcanian ambassadors.

Some Kushan coins have an effigy of "Roma", suggesting a strong level of awareness and some level of diplomatic relations.

The summer capital of the Kushan Empire in Kapisa has yielded a considerable amount of goods imported from the Roman Empire—in particular, various types of glassware. The Chinese described the presence of Roman goods in the Kushan realm:

"Precious things from Da Qin [the Roman Empire] can be found there [in Tianzhu or Northwestern India], as well as fine cotton cloths, fine wool carpets, perfumes of all sorts, sugar candy, pepper, ginger, and black salt."

— Hou Hanshu

Parthamaspates of Parthia, a client of Rome and ruler of the kingdom of Osroene, is known to have traded with the Kushan Empire, goods being sent by sea and through the Indus River.

=== Contacts with China ===
During the 1st and 2nd century AD, the Kushan Empire expanded militarily to the north, putting them at the center of the profitable Central Asian commerce. They are related to have collaborated militarily with the Chinese against nomadic incursion, particularly when they allied with the Han dynasty general Ban Chao against the Sogdians in 84, when the latter were trying to support a revolt by the king of Kashgar. Around 85, they also assisted the Chinese general in an attack on Turpan, east of the Tarim Basin.

Kushan coinage in China

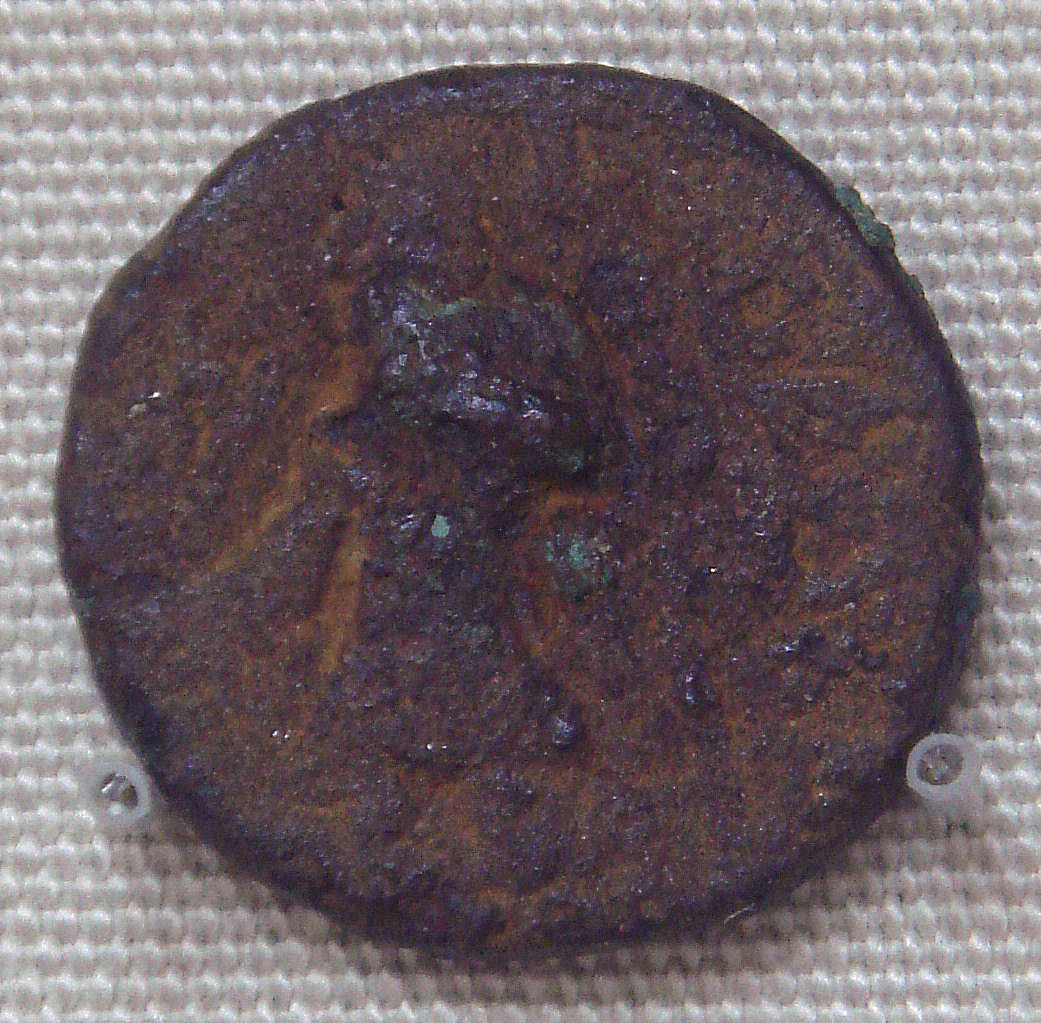
A bronze coin of Kanishka the Great found in Khotan, Tarim Basin.

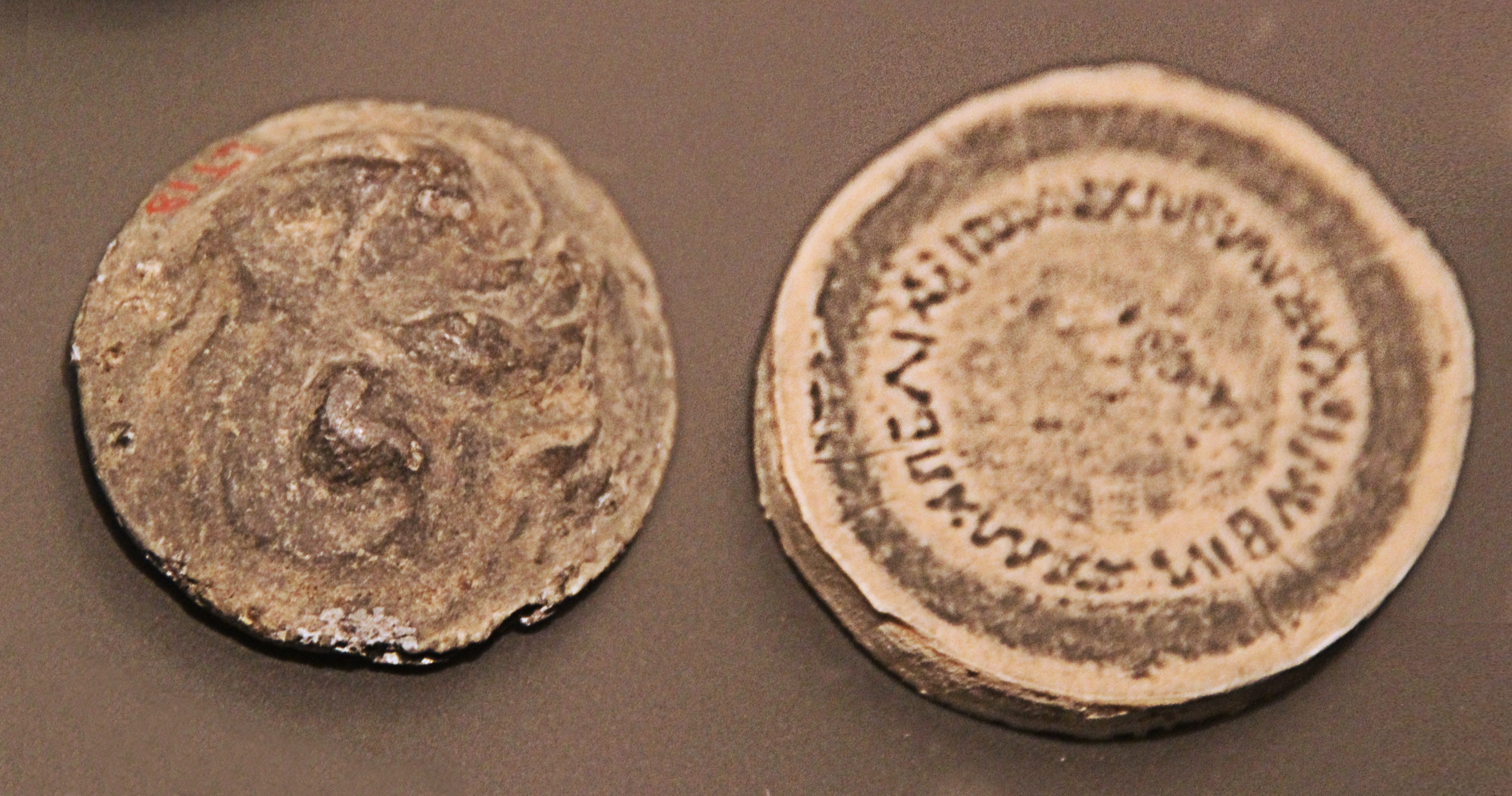
Eastern Han inscriptions on lead ingot, using barbarous Greek alphabet in the style of the Kushans, excavated in Shaanxi, 1st–2nd century AD. Gansu Provincial Museum.

In recognition for their support to the Chinese, the Kushans requested a Han princess, but were denied, even after they had sent presents to the Chinese court. In retaliation, they marched on Ban Chao in 86 with a force of 70,000, but were defeated by a smaller Chinese force. The Yuezhi retreated and paid tribute to the Chinese Empire during the reign of emperor He of Han (89–106).

The Kushans are again recorded to have sent presents to the Chinese court in 158–159 during the reign of Emperor Huan of Han.

Following these interactions, cultural exchanges further increased, and Kushan Buddhist missionaries, such as Lokaksema, became active in the Chinese capital cities of Luoyang and sometimes Nanjing, where they particularly distinguished themselves by their translation work. They were the first recorded promoters of Hinayana and Mahayana scriptures in China, greatly contributing to the Silk Road transmission of Buddhism.

== Rulers ==
One of the most recent list of rulers with dates is as follows:

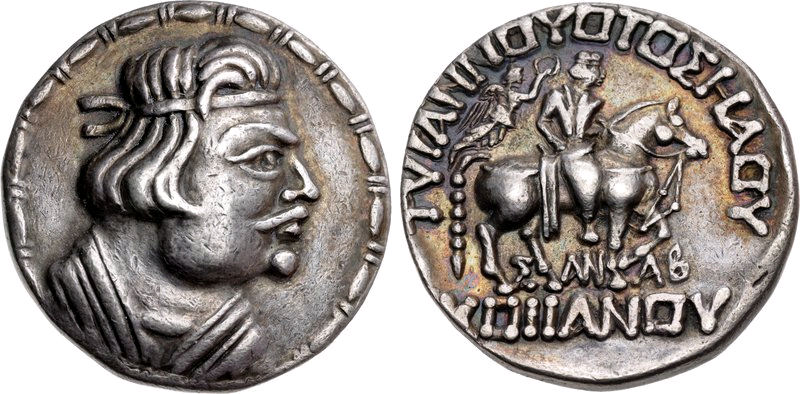
- Heraios (c. 1 – 30), first king to call himself "Kushan" on his coinage

=== Great Kushans ===
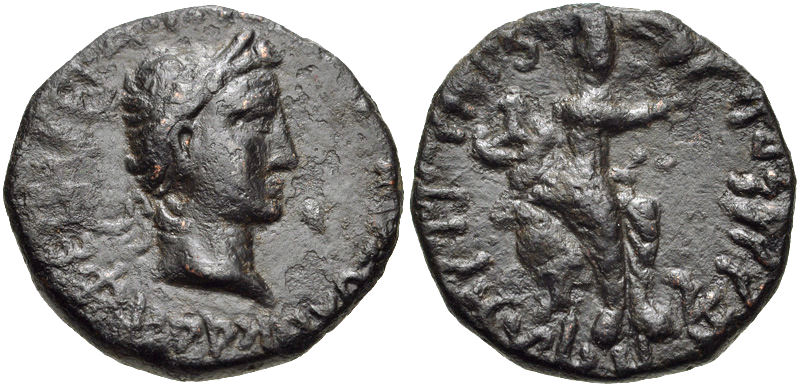
- Kujula Kadphises (c. 50 – c. 90)
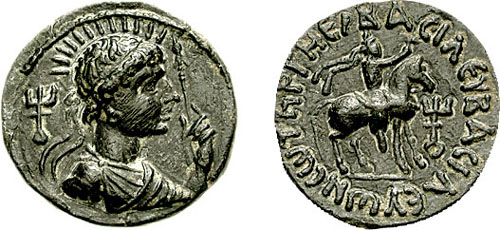
- Vima Takto (c. 90 – c. 113), alias Soter Megas or "Great Saviour."
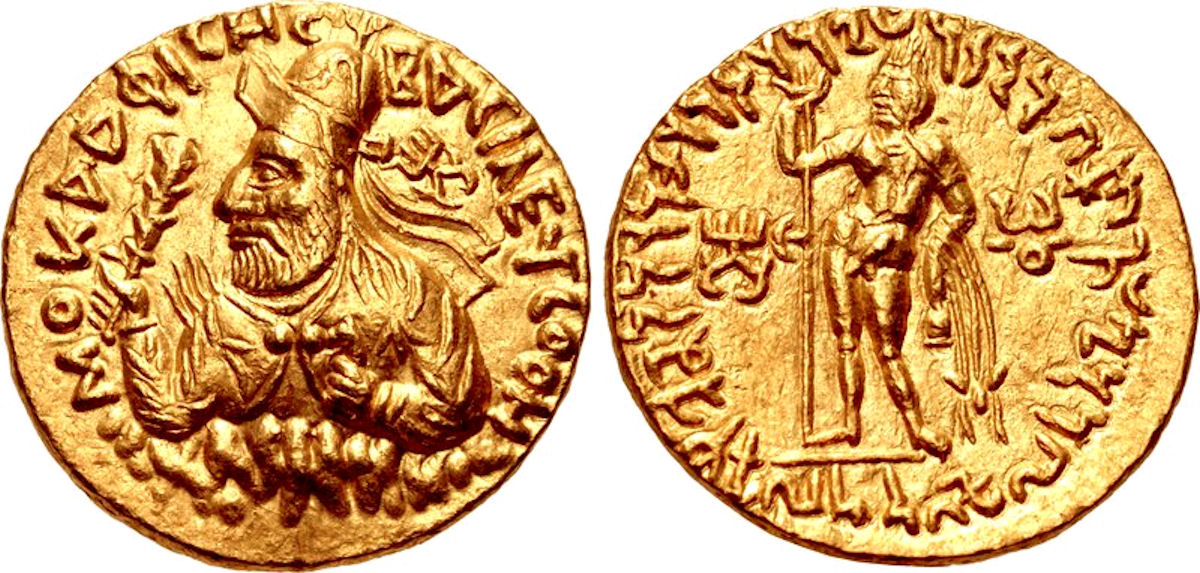
- Vima Kadphises (c. 113 – c. 127) First great Kushan Emperor
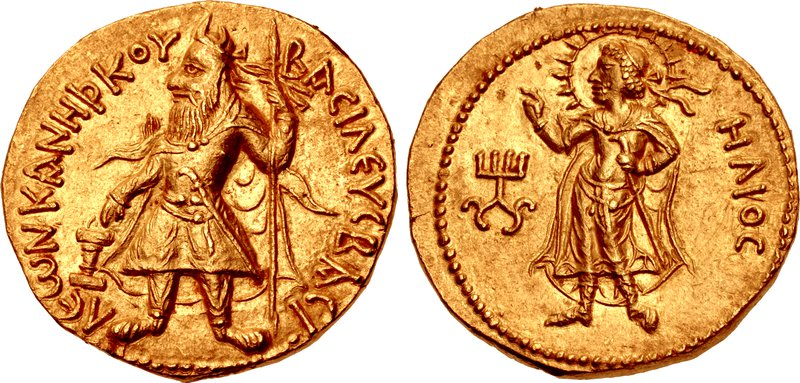
- Kanishka the Great (127 – c. 151)
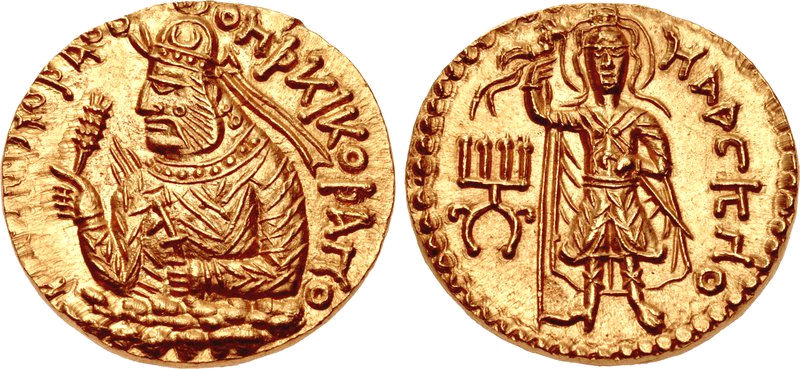
- Huvishka (c. 151 – c. 190)
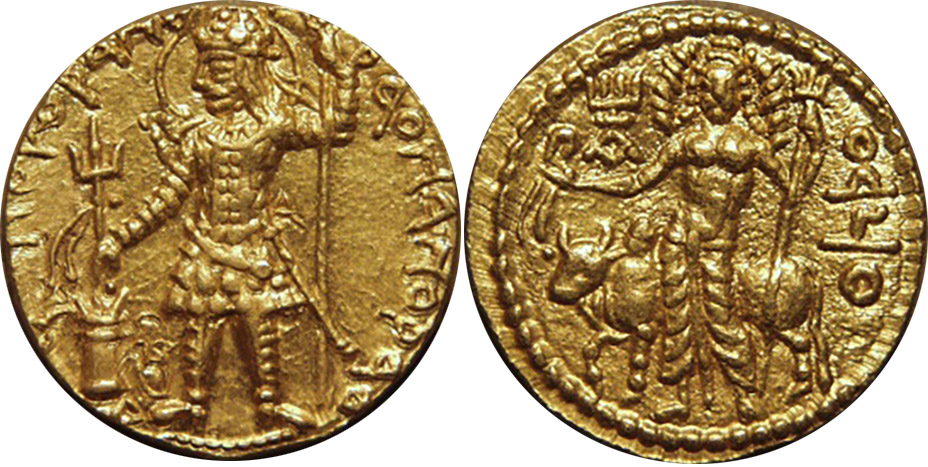
- Vasudeva I (c. 190 – c. 230) Last great Kushan Emperor
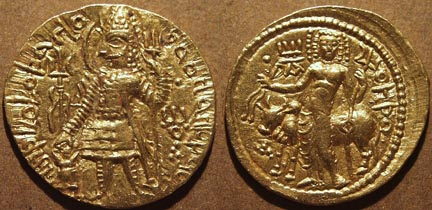
- Kanishka II (c. 230 – 247)
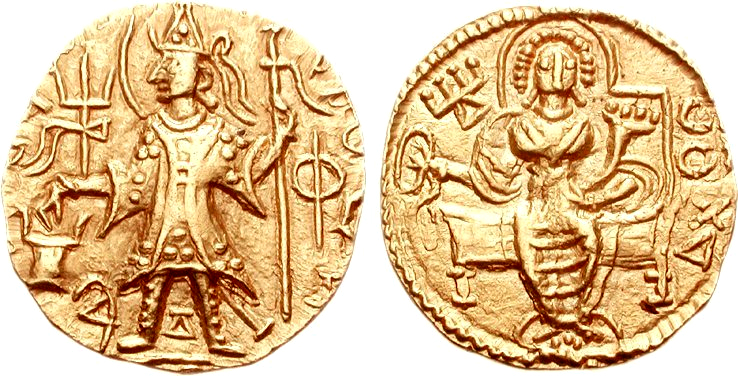
- Vashishka (c. 247 – 267)

=== Little Kushans ===
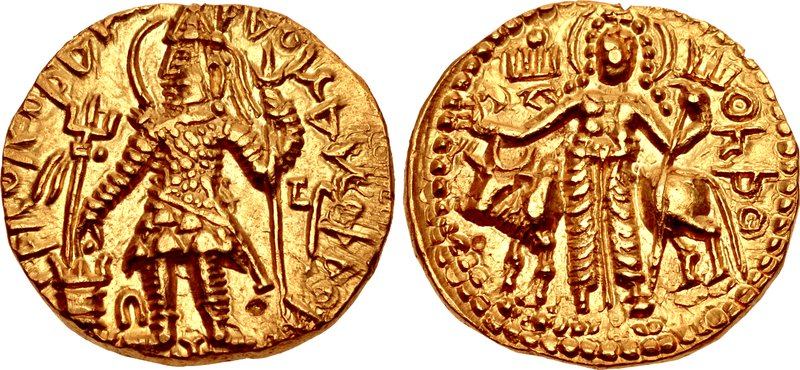
- Kanishka III (c. 267 – 270)
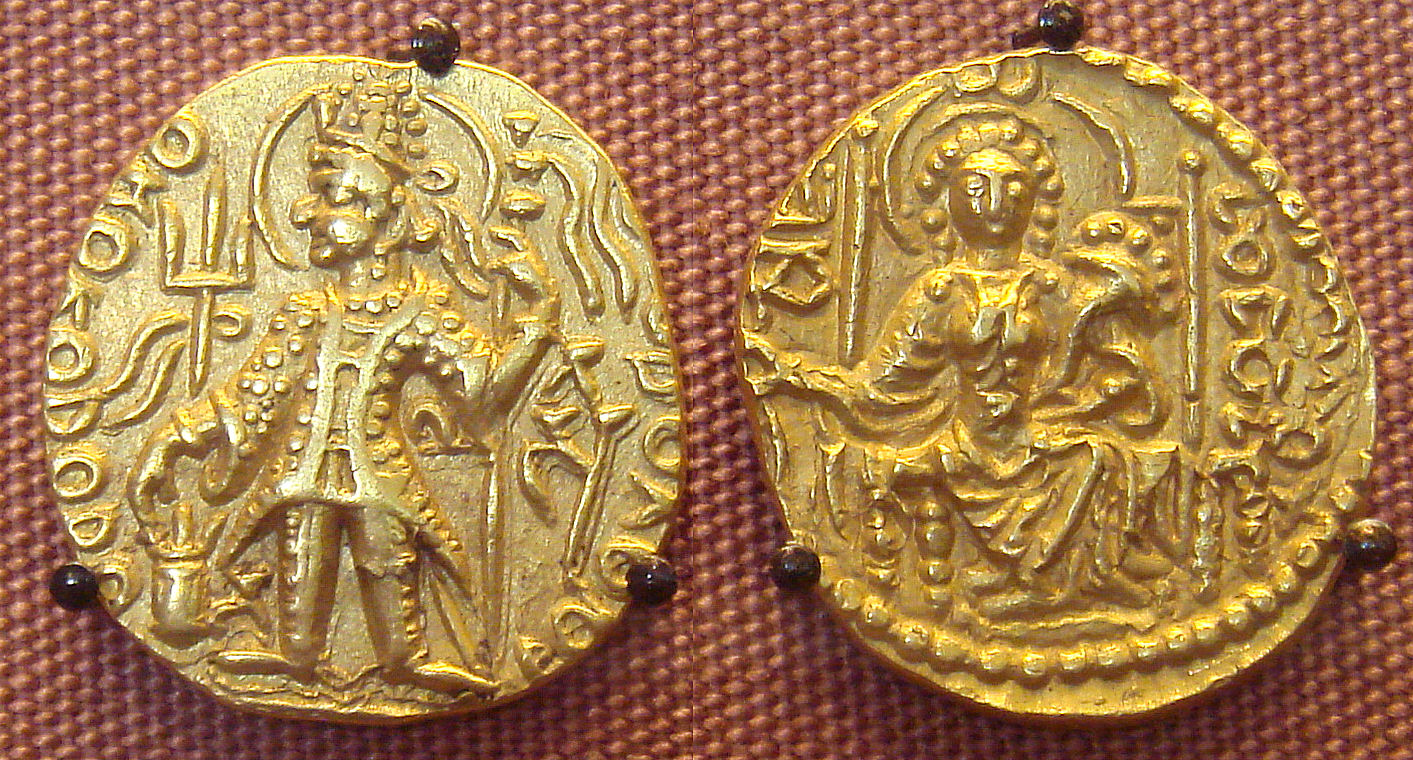
- Vasudeva II (c. 270 – 300)
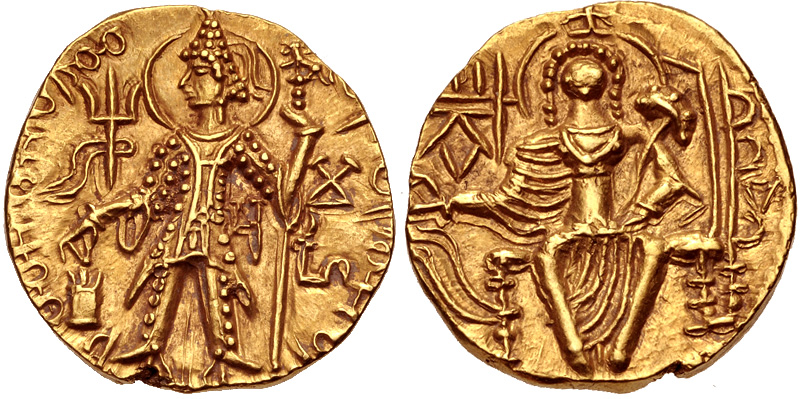
- Mahi (c. 300 – 305)
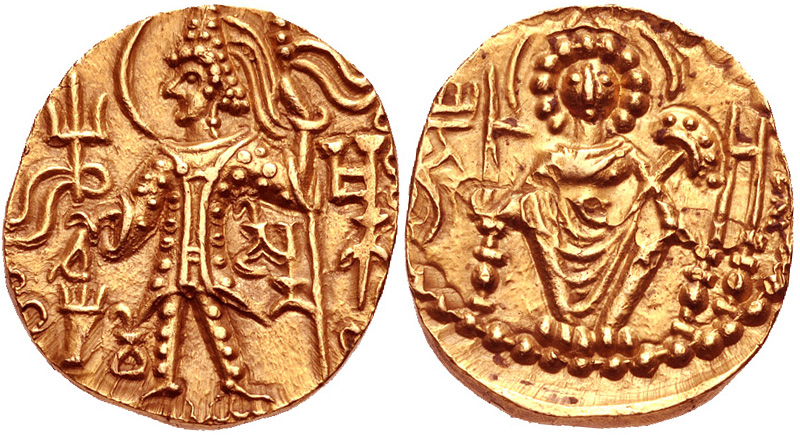
- Shaka (c. 305 – 335)
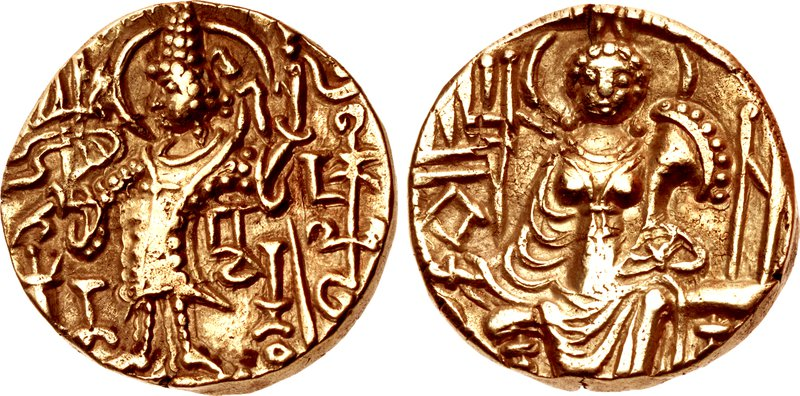
- Kipunada (c. 335 – 350)

Territories/ dates	Western India	Western Pakistan Balochistan	Paropamisadae Arachosia	Bajaur	Gandhara	Western Punjab	Eastern Punjab	Mathura	Pataliputra
				INDO-SCYTHIAN KINGDOM			INDO-GREEK KINGDOM	INDO-SCYTHIAN Northern Satraps	
25 BCE – 10 CE				Indo-Scythian dynasty of the APRACHARAJAS; Vijayamitra (ruled 12 BCE – 15 CE) (Note: From the dated inscription on the Rukhana reliquary)	Liaka Kusulaka; Patika Kusulaka; Zeionises	Kharahostes (ruled 10 BCE– 10 CE); Mujatria	Strato II and Strato III	Hagana	
10-20CE		INDO-PARTHIAN KINGDOM; Gondophares		Indravasu	INDO-PARTHIAN KINGDOM; Gondophares		Rajuvula		
20–30 CE			Ubouzanes; Pakores	Vispavarma (ruled c. 0–20 CE)	Sarpedones		Bhadayasa	Sodasa	
30-40 CE			KUSHAN EMPIRE; Kujula Kadphises (c. 50–90)	Indravarma	Abdagases		...	...	
40–45 CE				Aspavarma	Gadana		...	...	
45–50 CE				Sasan	Sases		...	...	
50–75 CE							...	...	
75–100 CE	Indo-Scythian dynasty of the WESTERN SATRAPS; Chastana		Vima Takto (c. 90–113)				...	...	
100–120 CE	Abhiraka		Vima Kadphises (c. 113–127)						
120 CE	Bhumaka; Nahapana	PARATARAJAS; Yolamira	Kanishka I (c. 127–151)				Great Satrap Kharapallana and Satrap Vanaspara for Kanishka I		
130–230 CE	Jayadaman; Rudradaman I Damajadasri I Jivadaman; Rudrasimha I Isvaradatta; Rudrasimha I Jivadaman; Rudrasena I	Bagamira; Arjuna; Hvaramira; Mirahvara	Huvishka (c. 151 – c. 190); Vasudeva I (c. 190 – 230)						
230–250 CE	Samghadaman; Damasena; Damajadasri II; Viradaman; Yasodaman I Vijayasena; Damajadasri III; Rudrasena II; Visvasimha	Miratakhma; Kozana; Bhimarjuna; Koziya; Datarvharna; Datarvharna	KUSHANO-SASANIANS; Ardashir I (c. 230 – 250); Ardashir II (?-245)	Kanishka II (c. 230 – 247)					
250–280	Samghadaman; Damasena; Damajadasri II; Viradaman; Yasodaman I Vijayasena; Damajadasri III; Rudrasena II; Visvasimha	Miratakhma; Kozana; Bhimarjuna; Koziya; Datarvharna; Datarvharna	Peroz I, "Kushanshah" (c. 250 – 265); Hormizd I, "Kushanshah" (c. 265 – 295)			Vāsishka (c. 247 – 267); Kanishka III (c. 267 – 270)			
280–300	Bhratadarman	Datayola II	Hormizd II, "Kushanshah" (c. 295 – 300)			Vasudeva II (c. 267 – 300)		GUPTA EMPIRE; Chandragupta I Samudragupta; Chandragupta II	
300–320 CE	Visvasena; Rudrasimha II; Jivadaman		Peroz II, "Kushanshah" (c. 300 – 325)			Mahi (c. 300–305); Shaka (c. 305 – 335)		GUPTA EMPIRE; Chandragupta I Samudragupta; Chandragupta II	
320–388 CE	Yasodaman II; Rudradaman II; Rudrasena III; Simhasena; Rudrasena IV		Varahran I (325–350); Shapur II Sassanid king and "Kushanshah" (c. 350)			Kipunada (c. 335 – 350)		GUPTA EMPIRE; Chandragupta I Samudragupta; Chandragupta II	
388–396 CE	Rudrasimha III		KIDARITES invasion					GUPTA EMPIRE; Chandragupta I Samudragupta; Chandragupta II	

== See also ==
- History of Afghanistan
- History of Pakistan
- History of India
- Kucha(with a related etymology)
- Iranians in China
- Kushan script

== Sources ==
- Avari, Burjor (2007). India: The Ancient Past. London: Routledge. ISBN 978-0-415-35616-9.
- Beckwith, Christopher I. (2009). Empires of the Silk Road: A History of Central Eurasia from the Bronze Age to the Present. Princeton University Press. ISBN 978-1-4008-2994-1.
- Benjamin, Craig (2007). The Yuezhi: Origin, Migration and the Conquest of Northern Bactria. ISD. ISBN 978-2-503-52429-0.
- Bopearachchi, Osmund (2003). De l'Indus à l'Oxus, Archéologie de l'Asie Centrale (in French). Lattes: Association imago-musée de Lattes. ISBN 2-9516679-2-2.
- Bopearachchi, Osmund (2007). "Some Observations on the Chronology of the Early Kushans". In Gyselen, Rika (ed.). Des Indo-Grecs aux Sassanides: données pour l'histoire et la géographie historique. Vol. XVII. Group pour l'Etude de la Civilisation du Moyen-Orient.
- Chavannes, Édouard (1906). Trois Généraux Chinois de la dynastie des Han Orientaux. Pan Tch'ao (32–102 p.C.); – son fils Pan Yong; – Leang K'in (112 p.C.). Chapitre LXXVII du Heou Han chou. T'oung pao 7.
- Chavannes, Édouard (1907). Les pays d'occident d'après le Heou Han chou. T'oung pao 8. pp. 149–244.
- Dani, Ahmad Hasan; Litvinsky, Boris Abramovich; Zamir Safi, M. H. "Eastern Kushans, Kidarines in Gandhara ans Kashmir, and Later Hephthalites". In Litvinsky (1996), pp. 163–184.
- Dorn'eich, Chris M. (2008). Chinese sources on the History of the Niusi-Wusi-Asi (oi)-Rishi (ka)-Arsi-Arshi-Ruzhi and their Kueishuang-Kushan Dynasty. Shiji 110/Hanshu 94A: The Xiongnu: Synopsis of Chinese original Text and several Western Translations with Extant Annotations. Berlin. To read or download go to:
- Enoki, K.; Koshelenko, G. A.; Haidary, Z. "The Yu'eh-chih and their migrations". In Harmatta, Puri & Etemadi (1994), pp. 165–183.
- Faccenna, Domenico (1980). Butkara I (Swāt, Pakistan) 1956–1962, Volume III 1 (in English). Rome: IsMEO (Istituto Italiano Per Il Medio Ed Estremo Oriente).
- Falk, Harry (1995–1996). Silk Road Art and Archaeology IV.
- Falk, Harry (2001). "The yuga of Sphujiddhvaja and the era of the Kuṣāṇas". Silk Road Art and Archaeology VII. pp. 121–136.
- Falk, Harry (2004). "The Kaniṣka era in Gupta records". Silk Road Art and Archaeology X. pp. 167–176.
- Foucher, M. A. 1901. "Notes sur la geographie ancienne du Gandhâra (commentaire à un chaptaire de Hiuen-Tsang)." BEFEO No. 4, Oct. 1901, pp. 322–369.
- Golden, Peter B. (1992). An Introduction to the History of the Turkic Peoples. Harrassowitz Verlag.
- Goyal, S. R. (2005). Ancient Indian Inscriptions. Jodhpur, India: Kusumanjali Book World.
- Grousset, René (1970). The Empire of the Steppes: A History of Central Asia. Rutgers University Press. ISBN 978-0-8135-1304-1.
- Hargreaves, H. (1910–11). "Excavations at Shāh-jī-kī Dhērī"; Archaeological Survey of India. pp. 25–32.
- Harmatta, János. "Religions in the Kushan Empire". In Harmatta, Puri & Etemadi (1999), pp. 313–330.
- Harmatta, János; Puri, B. N.; Etemadi, G. F., eds. (1994). History of Civilizations of Central Asia. Volume II The Development of Sedentary and Nomadic Civilizations, 700 B.C. to A.D. 250. Paris: UNESCO. ISBN 978-92-3-102846-5.
- Harmatta, János; Puri, B. N.; Etemadi, G. F., eds. (1999) [1994]. History of Civilizations of Central Asia. Volume II The Development of Sedentary and Nomadic Civilizations, 700 B.C. to A.D. 250. Delhi: Motilal Banarsidass. ISBN 978-8-1208-1408-0.
- Hill, John E. 2004. The Peoples of the West from the Weilüe 魏略 by Yu Huan 魚豢: A Third Century Chinese Account Composed between 239 and 265 CE. Draft annotated English translation.
- Hill, John E. (2009). Through the Jade Gate to Rome: A Study of the Silk Routes during the Later Han Dynasty, First to Second Centuries CE. BookSurge. ISBN 978-1-4392-2134-1.
- Hoey, W. "The Word Kozola as Used of Kadphises on Ku͟s͟hān Coins." Journal of the Royal Asiatic Society of Great Britain and Ireland, 1902, pp. 428–429. JSTOR 25208419.
- Iloliev, A. "King of Men: ῾Ali ibn Abi Talib in Pamiri Folktales." Journal of Shi'a Islamic Studies, vol. 8 no. 3, 2015, pp. 307–323. Project MUSE, doi:10.1353/isl.2015.0036.
- Kennedy, J. "The Later Kushans." Journal of the Royal Asiatic Society of Great Britain and Ireland, 1913, pp. 1054–1064. JSTOR 25189078.
- Konow, Sten, ed. 1929. Kharoshthī Inscriptions with Exception of those of Asoka. Corpus Inscriptionum Indicarum, Vol. II, Part I. Reprint: Indological Book House, Varanasi, 1969.
- Lebedynsky, Iaroslav (2006). Les Saces. Paris: Editions Errance. ISBN 2-87772-337-2.
- Lerner, Martin (1984). The flame and the lotus: Indian and Southeast Asian art from the Kronos collections. New York: The Metropolitan Museum of Art. ISBN 0-87099-374-7.
- Litvinsky, Boris Abramovich, ed. (1996). History of Civilizations of Central Asia. Volume III The crossroads of civilizations: A.D. 250 to 750. Paris: UNESCO. ISBN 9789231032110.
- Liu, Xinru (Fall 2001). "Migration and Settlement of the Yuezhi-Kushan: Interaction and Interdependence of Nomadic and Sedentary Societies". Journal of World History. 12 (2). University of Hawaii Press: 261–292. doi:10.1353/jwh.2001.0034. S2CID 162211306.
- Liu, Xinru (2010). The Silk Road in World History. New York: Oxford University Press.
- Loewe, Michael; Shaughnessy, Edward L. (1999). The Cambridge History of Ancient China: From the Origins of Civilization to 221 BC. Cambridge University Press. doi:10.1017/CHOL9780521470308. ISBN 0-521-47030-7.
- Mallory, J. P. (1997). Encyclopedia of Indo-European Culture. Taylor & Francis. ISBN 1-884964-98-2.
- Mallory, J. P.; Mair, Victor H. (2008). The Tarim Mummies: Ancient China and the Mystery of the Earliest Peoples from the West. Thames & Hudson. ISBN 978-0-500-28372-1.
- Masson, V. M. "The Forgotten Kushan Empire: New Discoveries at Zar-Tepe." Archaeology, vol. 37, no. 1, 1984, pp. 32–37. JSTOR 41728802.
- Narain, A. K. (1990). "Indo-Europeans in Central Asia". In Sinor, Denis (ed.). The Cambridge History of Early Inner Asia. Vol. 1. Cambridge University Press. pp. 151–177. doi:10.1017/CHOL9780521243049.007. ISBN 978-1-139-05489-8.
- Pulleyblank, Edwin G. (1966). "Chinese and Indo-Europeans". The Journal of the Royal Asiatic Society of Great Britain and Ireland. 98 (1/2): 9–39. doi:10.1017/S0035869X00124566. JSTOR 25202896. S2CID 144332029.
- Puri, Baij Nath. "The Sakas and Indo-Parthians". In Harmatta, Puri & Etemadi (1994), pp. 184–201.
- Puri, Baij Nath. "The Kushans". In Harmatta, Puri & Etemadi (1999), pp. 247–264.
- "Red Sandstone Railing Pillar." The British Museum Quarterly, vol. 30, no. 1/2, 1965, pp. 64–64. JSTOR 4422925.
- Rezakhani, Khodadad (2017a). "East Iran in Late Antiquity". ReOrienting the Sasanians: East Iran in Late Antiquity. Edinburgh University Press. pp. 1–256. ISBN 978-1-4744-0030-5. JSTOR 10.3366/j.ctt1g04zr8. (registration required)
- Rezakhani, Khodadad (2017b). "From the Kushans to the Western Turks". In Daryaee, Touraj (ed.). King of the Seven Climes: A History of the Ancient Iranian World (3000 BCE - 651 CE). UCI Jordan Center for Persian Studies. pp. 1–236. ISBN 978-0-692-86440-1.
- Rife, J. L. "The Making of Roman India by Grant Parker (review)." American Journal of Philology, vol. 135 no. 4, 2014, pp. 672–675. Project MUSE, doi:10.1353/ajp.2014.0046.
- Rosenfield, John M. (1967). The Dynastic Arts of the Kushans. University of California Press.
- Rosenfield, John M. (1993). The Dynastic Art of the Kushans. New Delhi: Munshiram Manoharlal. ISBN 81-215-0579-8.
- Roux, Jean-Paul (1997). L'Asie Centrale, Histoire et Civilization [Central Asia: History and Civilization] (in French). Fayard. ISBN 978-2-213-59894-9.
- Sailendra Nath Sen (1999). Ancient Indian History and Civilization. New Age International. ISBN 978-81-224-1198-0.
- Sarianidi, Viktor. 1985. The Golden Hoard of Bactria: From the Tillya-tepe Excavations in Northern Afghanistan. Harry N. Abrams, Inc. New York.
- Sims-Williams, Nicholas; Cribb, Joe. "A new Bactrian inscription of Kanishka the Great". In Falk (1995–1996), pp. 75–142.
- Sims-Williams, Nicholas (1998). "Further notes on the Bactrian inscription of Rabatak, with an Appendix on the names of Kujula Kadphises and Vima Taktu in Chinese.". Proceedings of the Third European Conference of Iranian Studies Part 1: Old and Middle Iranian Studies. Wiesbaden. pp. 79–93.
- Sims-Williams, Nicholas. 1998. "Further notes on the Bactrian inscription of Rabatak, with an Appendix on the names of Kujula Kadphises and Vima Taktu in Chinese." Proceedings of the Third European Conference of Iranian Studies Part 1: Old and Middle Iranian Studies. Edited by Nicholas Sims-Williams. Wiesbaden. pp. 79–93.
- Sivaramamurti, C. (1976). Śatarudrīya: Vibhūti of Śiva's Iconography. Delhi: Abhinav Publications.
- Spooner, D. B. (1908–09). "Excavations at Shāh-jī-kī Dhērī."; Archaeological Survey of India. pp. 38–59.
- Watson, Burton. Trans. 1993. Records of the Grand Historian of China: Han Dynasty II. Translated from the Shiji of Sima Qian. Chapter 123: "The Account of Dayuan", Columbia University Press. Revised Edition. ISBN 0-231-08166-9; ISBN 0-231-08167-7 (pbk.)
- Wink, André (2002). Al-Hind: The Slavic Kings and the Islamic conquest, 11th-13th centuries. BRILL.
- Zürcher, E. (1968). "The Yüeh-chih and Kaniṣka in the Chinese sources". In Basham, A. L. (ed.). Papers on the Date of Kaniṣka. Leiden: E. J. Brill. pp. 346–393.

Timeline and cultural period	Indus plain (Punjab-Sapta Sindhu-Gujarat)	Gangetic Plain			Central India	Southern India
Timeline and cultural period	Indus plain (Punjab-Sapta Sindhu-Gujarat)	Upper Gangetic Plain (Ganga-Yamuna doab)	Middle Gangetic Plain	Lower Gangetic Plain	Central India	Southern India
IRON AGE
Culture	Late Vedic Period	Late Vedic Period; Painted Grey Ware culture	Late Vedic Period; Northern Black Polished Ware		Pre-history	
6th century BCE	Gandhara	Kuru-Panchala	Magadha		Adivasi (tribes)	Assaka
Culture	Persian-Greek influences	"Second Urbanisation"; Rise of Shramana movements Jainism - Buddhism - Ājīvika - Yoga			Pre-history	
5th century BCE	(Persian conquests)		Shaishunaga dynasty		Adivasi (tribes)	Assaka
4th century BCE	(Greek conquests)	Nanda empire				
HISTORICAL AGE
Culture	Spread of Buddhism				Pre-history	
3rd century BCE	Maurya Empire					Satavahana dynasty Sangam period (300 BCE – 200 CE); Early Cholas; Early Pandyan kingdom Cheras
Culture	Preclassical Hinduism (Note: Michaels (2004) p.39) - "Hindu Synthesis" (Note: Hiltebeitel (2002)) (ca. 200 BCE - 300 CE) (Note: Michaels (2004) p.39) (Note: Hiltebeitel (2002)); Epics - Puranas - Ramayana - Mahabharata - Bhagavad Gita - Brahma Sutras - Smarta Tradition; Mahayana Buddhism					
2nd century BCE	Indo-Greek Kingdom		Shunga Empire; Maha-Meghavahana Dynasty			Satavahana dynasty Sangam period (300 BCE – 200 CE); Early Cholas; Early Pandyan kingdom Cheras
1st century BCE	Indo-Greek Kingdom		Shunga Empire; Maha-Meghavahana Dynasty			Satavahana dynasty Sangam period (300 BCE – 200 CE); Early Cholas; Early Pandyan kingdom Cheras
1st century CE	Indo-Scythians; Indo-Parthians		Kuninda Kingdom			Satavahana dynasty Sangam period (300 BCE – 200 CE); Early Cholas; Early Pandyan kingdom Cheras
2nd century	Kushan Empire					Satavahana dynasty Sangam period (300 BCE – 200 CE); Early Cholas; Early Pandyan kingdom Cheras
3rd century	Kushano-Sasanian Kingdom; Western Satraps	Kushan Empire		Kamarupa kingdom	Adivasi (tribes)	Satavahana dynasty Sangam period (300 BCE – 200 CE); Early Cholas; Early Pandyan kingdom Cheras
Culture	"Golden Age of Hinduism"(ca. CE 320-650) (Note: Michaels (2004) p.40); Puranas - Kural; Co-existence of Hinduism and Buddhism					
4th century	Kidarites	Gupta Empire; Varman dynasty				Andhra Ikshvakus; Kalabhra dynasty Kadamba Dynasty; Western Ganga Dynasty
5th century	Hephthalite Empire	Alchon Huns				Vishnukundina; Kalabhra dynasty
6th century	Nezak Huns; Kabul Shahi; Maitraka				Adivasi (tribes)	Vishnukundina; Badami Chalukyas; Kalabhra dynasty
Culture	Late-Classical Hinduism (ca. CE 650-1100) (Note: Michaels (2004) p.41); Advaita Vedanta - Tantra; Decline of Buddhism in India					
7th century	Indo-Sassanids		Vakataka dynasty Empire of Harsha	Mlechchha dynasty	Adivasi (tribes)	Badami Chalukyas; Eastern Chalukyas; Pandyan kingdom (revival); Pallava
7th century	Karkota dynasty				Adivasi (tribes)	
8th century	Kabul Shahi	Pala Empire			Adivasi (tribes)	Eastern Chalukyas; Pandyan kingdom Kalachuri
9th century	Gurjara-Pratihara				Adivasi (tribes)	Rashtrakuta Empire; Eastern Chalukyas; Pandyan kingdom Medieval Cholas; Chera Perumals of Makkotai
10th century	Ghaznavids			Pala dynasty Kamboja-Pala dynasty	Adivasi (tribes)	Kalyani Chalukyas; Eastern Chalukyas; Medieval Cholas; Chera Perumals of Makkotai; Rashtrakuta
References and sources for table References Sources: Flood, Gavin D. (1996), An Introduction to Hinduism, Cambridge University Press; Hiltebeitel, Alf (2002), Hinduism. In: Joseph Kitagawa, "The Religious Traditions of Asia: Religion, History, and Culture", Routledge; Michaels, Axel (2004), Hinduism. Past and present, Princeton, New Jersey: Princeton University Press
