= Robatak =

Robatak or Rabatak (Persian: رباطك) may refer to:

- Robatak, Afghanistan
- Robatak, Fars, Iran

== See also ==
- Rabatak inscription, a Bactrian inscription found in Robatak, Afghanistan
