= Nana (Bactrian goddess) =

Ancient Eastern Iranian goddess

- Astral goddess
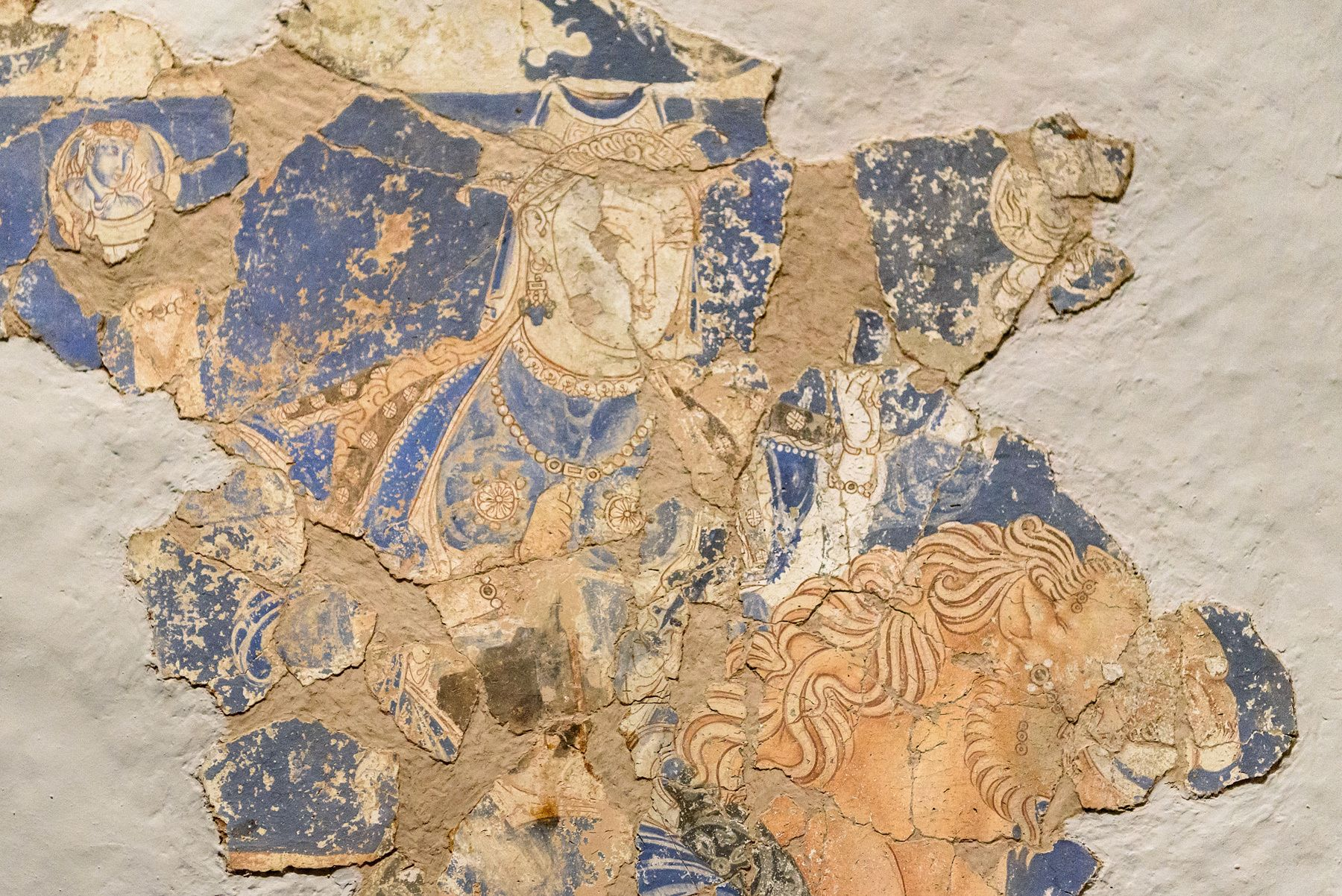
- A Sogdian mural from Bunjikat depicting a four-armed Nana seated on a lion.
- Major cult center: Panjakent
- Symbols: crescent (in Bactria); representations of the sun and the moon (in Sogdia)
- Adherents: Bactrians, Sogdians, Chorasmians, Yuezhi (Kushans), Khotanese
- Mount: lion

Genealogy
- Spouse: possibly Tish

Equivalents
- Mesopotamian: Nanaya

Nana was an ancient Eastern Iranian goddess worshiped by Bactrians, Sogdians and Chorasmians, as well as by Yuezhi, including Kushans, as the head of their respective pantheons. She was derived from the earlier Mesopotamian goddess Nanaya. Attempts to connect her with Inanna (Ishtar) instead depend on the erroneous notion that the latter was identical with Nanaya, which is considered outdated. She was regarded as an astral deity, and in Sogdian art was depicted with representations of the sun and moon. Kushan emperors additionally associated her with royal power. In Sogdia she might have also developed an otherwise unattested warlike aspect, as evidenced by murals showing her in battles against demons. She was seemingly associated with the Sogdian counterpart of Tishtrya, Tish, who might have been regarded as her spouse.

There is no consensus regarding the date of Nana's introduction to Central Asia, though most researchers assume it occurred in the late first millennium BCE. Her cult was adopted by the rulers of the Kushan Empire, and she is mentioned in the Rabatak inscription of Kanishka as the deity who granted him his position. She later spread to Sogdia, where she became a popular deity, as evidenced by her prevalence in theophoric names and her numerous representations in art. Panjakent was most likely her cult center, and a temple dedicated to her was located there. Attestations are also available from other Sogdian sites and from text corpora mentioning Sogdians living in China. Some evidence also exists for the worship of Nana in Chorasmia and Khotan.

== Name and origin ==
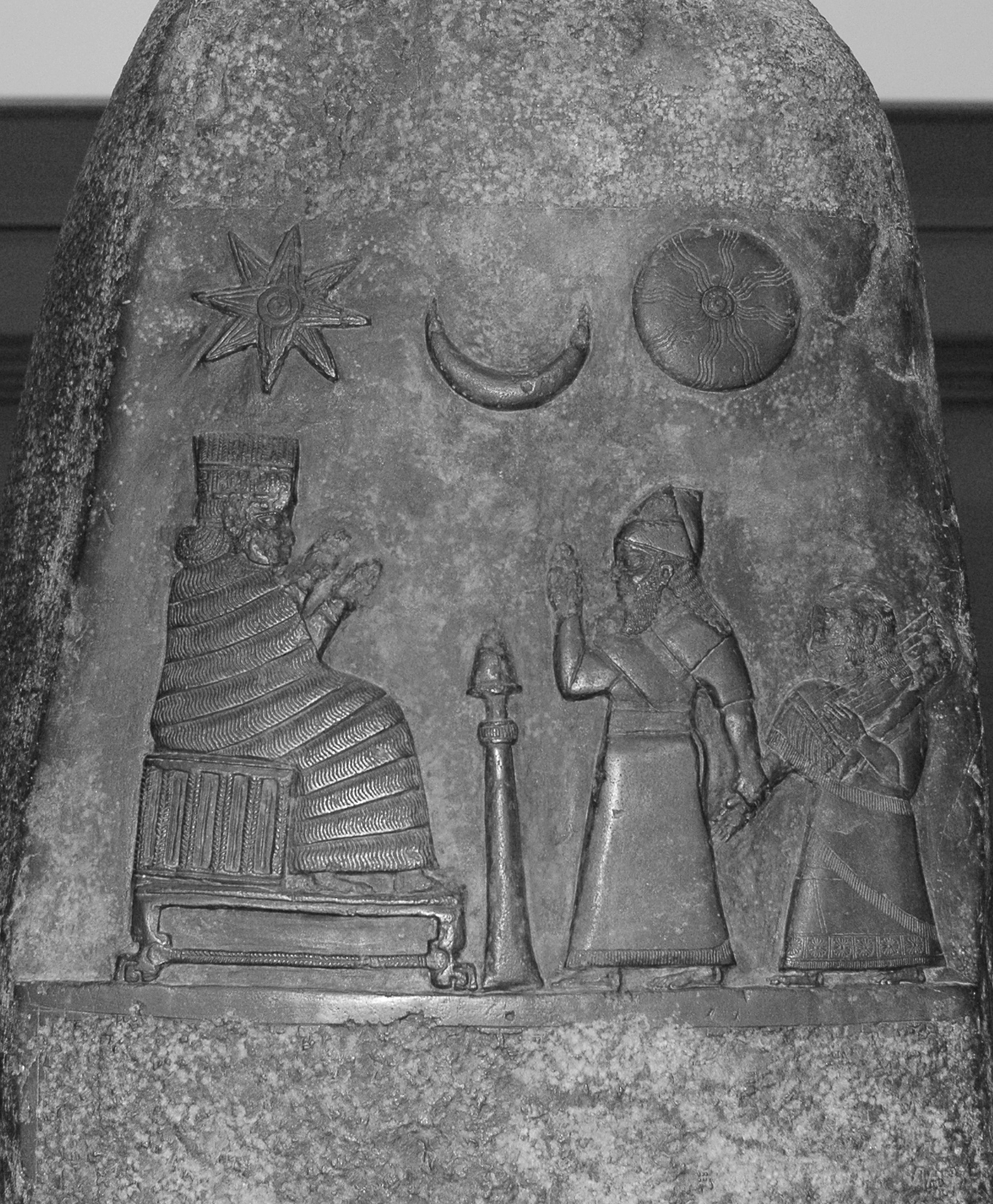
Nana's Mesopotamian forerunner Nanaya seated on a throne, as depicted on a stele of king Meli-Shipak II (1186–1172 BCE).

On the coins of Kanishka, Nana's name is spelled as Nanaia (Ναναια) in Greek and Nana (Νανα) in Bactrian. An additional attested variant is Nanašao (Ναναϸαο), "royal Nana". In Sogdian it was rendered as Nana or Nanai (𐼻𐼻𐼷, nny). A Chinese phonetic transcription is also attested, 那那. Additional variants occur in Chinese writings of Sogdian theophoric names, for example 娜寧 (nà-níng). Examples have been identified texts from Turfan as an element in names such as Nanaivandak (那寧畔陀, Naningpantuo; "servant of Nana") and Nanaifarn (那你潘, Nanifan; "glory of Nana"). (Note: The name Di Nanipan (翟那你潘) from the same corpus has been compared with the aforementioned Sogdian theophoric names, though the family name Di referred to descendants of the Gaoju instead.) In a bilingual Chinese-Sogdian inscription which also mentions an individual named Nanaivandak ("Ninipantuo", 埿埿槃陁) Nana's name is instead transcribed as 埿埿, Nini.

Nana is presumed to be a derivative of the Mesopotamian goddess Nanaya. The original form of the latter name, ^{d}na-na-a (𒀭𒈾𒈾𒀀), appears for the first time in cuneiform texts from the Shulgi-simti archive from Puzrish-Dagan (Drehem), dated to the Ur III period (c. 2100 BCE). The only possible earlier attestations are Old Akkadian personal names from Gasur with the element na-na (𒈾𒈾, written without the determinative designating theonyms), but they might be unrelated, as the evidence for later worship of Nanaya in the Diyala River basin and elsewhere in the east of Mesopotamia is scarce. The etymology of Nanaya's name is unknown, though according to Joan Goodnick Westenholz it can be assumed that it originates in Akkadian, as it ends with a suffix common in hypocoristics and nisba formations in Semitic languages. An alternate view is that it was a loanword from Elamite. Proponents of this theory suggest it was derived from the term nan(n)-, "day" or "morning", though Olga Drewnowska-Rymarz stresses that support for this view among researchers is limited. She states that Nanaya's complete absence from Old Elamite sources makes it implausible.

Following François Lenormant's proposal from 1876, Nana is sometimes incorrectly described by historians of Central Asia as a derivative of Inanna (Ishtar), in this context treated as identical with Nanaya, but Daniel T. Potts notes that the modern consensus view in Assyriology is that they were distinct goddesses. Joan Goodnick Westenholz stressed that the two were never confused with each other in primary sources, and accordingly cannot be treated as interchangeable in scholarship. Westenholz's and Potts's conclusions have been subsequently adopted by the Iranologists Michael Shenkar and Matteo Compareti in their studies of Nana. While it has been suggested that Nana's cult in Central Asia flourished because she initially developed through syncretism between her Mesopotamian forerunner and an Iranian goddess, neither textual nor archeological sources support this conclusion. Shenkar states that modern attempts to identify her as a form of Anahita or Spenta Armaiti should be considered "artificial", and depend on the incorrect assumption that the religion of Eastern Iranian peoples matched Western Iranian Zoroastrian tradition more closely than it did in reality.

== Character and iconography ==
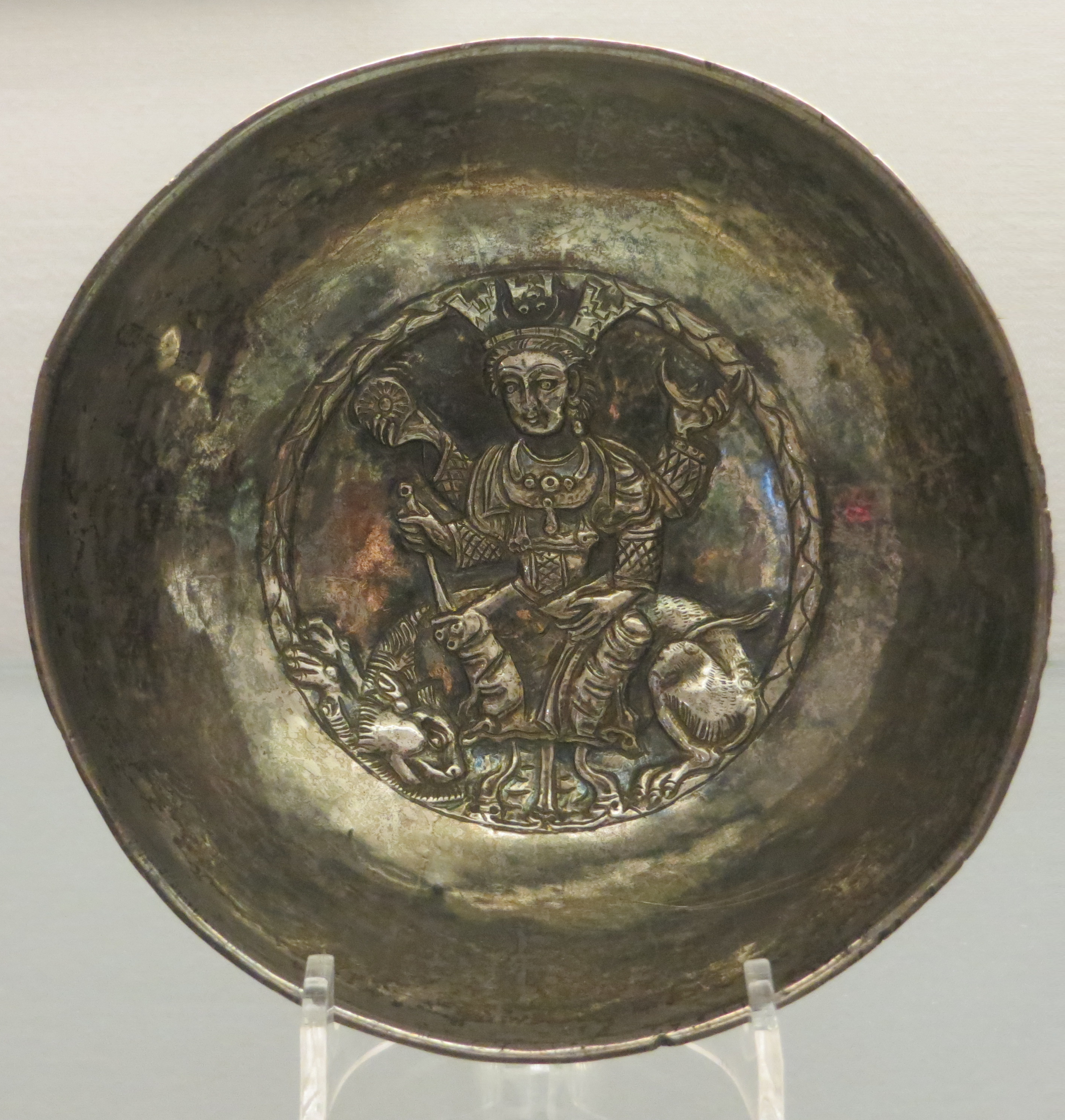
Four-armed Nana seated on a lion, as depicted on a Chorasmian bowl.

Available sources indicate that Nana was the head of the Kushan and Sogdian pantheons, and she likely played an analogous role in Chorasmia as well. Her character was regarded as benevolent. Rulers from the Kushan dynasty associated her with royal legitimacy. In this capacity she was depicted drawing a sword, or in a single exceptional case blessing the ruler. Kushans sometimes depicted Nana with four arms, which is also attested for her in later Sogdian art. In the latter context the additional pair of arms reflected conventions of Mahayana Buddhist art of the region, in which multi-armed deities were widespread. She is also depicted with four arms in Chorasmian art, for example on a silver bowl dated to 658.

=== Nana and lions ===
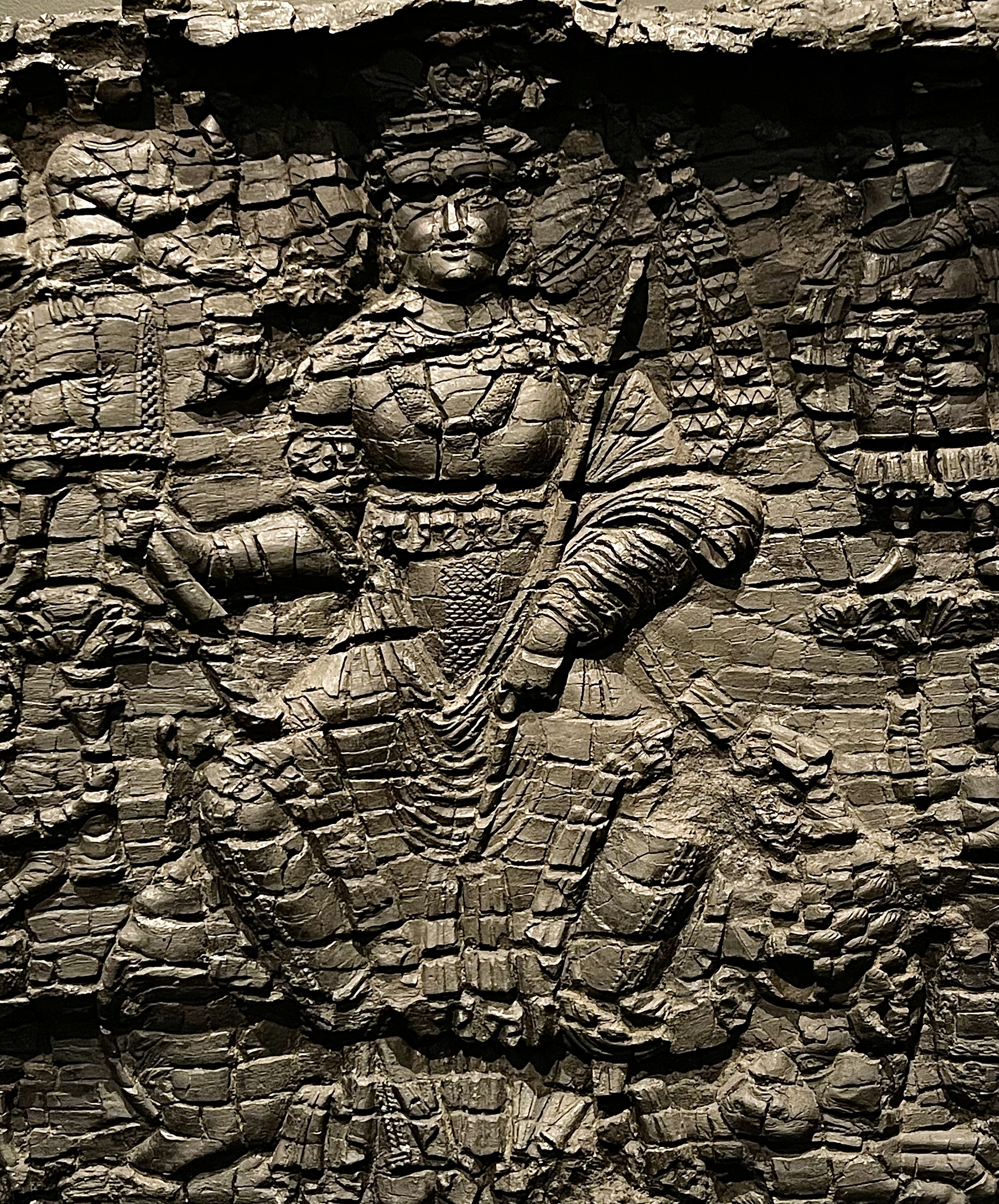
Wooden panel from Kafir-kala with a depiction of Nana holding a scepter with a zoomorphic finial

The lion was regarded as both an attribute and mount of Nana. In Kushan art, was typically depicted seated on the back of this animal. Henri-Paul Francfort stresses that she should be considered distinct from the goddess Ardoksho, as - despite similarities in iconography - only the latter is consistently portrayed holding a cornucopia. A possible forerunner to the depictions of Nana riding on a lion is the Assyrian convention of showing Ishtar standing on the back of a lion, which in cities such as Hatra prevailed through Hellenistic and Roman periods. The common sideways position might however be influenced by portraying figures such as Dionysus, Ariadne and Cybele seated sideways on wild cats in Hellenistic art, as it is known such images reached Bactria, as evidenced for example by objects recovered from tombs in Tillya Tepe. The image of Nana riding on a lion is also known from Sogdia, though in contrast with Kushan depictions she is portrayed riding the animal astride, with a stirrup visible, rather than sideways. The addition of the stirrup to her iconography is not attested earlier on and according to Katsumi Tanabe can be considered one of two best attested purely Sogdian artistic innovations, next to images of winged camels. Most likely it was influenced by a style of horse-riding popular among Sogdian women. In Sogdian art no other deities were associated with lions.

Nana was also depicted holding scepters with lion-shaped zoomorphic finials, for example on a panel from Kafir-kala dated to the fifth or sixth century. A further possible example has been identified on a terracotta plaque from Afrasiab. She was also seemingly associated with birds, as evidenced by Sogdian works of art portraying her holding banners topped with figures of these animals.

=== Nana as an astral goddess ===
Nana was regarded as an astral deity. In Kushan art, she was typically depicted with a crescent on her head. In two cases, the crescent appears to be rising from her shoulders instead. The astral aspect of character was also emphasized in Sogdian art. Sogdians portrayed her holding representations of the sun and the moon in two of her hands. Joan Goodnick Westenholz suggested that these attributes might indicate that she was believed to maintain the balance between day and night. It is also possible that the sun and the moon represented Mithra and Mah, though in some cases a feminine face appears inside the latter. In some cases Nana was also depicted in a diadem decorated with a crescent. Harry Falk argues that it is implausible that Nana's crescent represents the moon, and that the halo present around her head in Kushan art is a reflection of the sun as argued by other researchers, as both of these celestial bodies are represented as independent deities in Kushan art, either as Helios and Selene or Mihir (Mithra) and Mah. He suggests that the crescent should instead be interpreted as a symbol of the planet Venus. While Galileo Galilei is generally considered the first person who observed crescent-shaped Venus, Falk argues that this phenomenon might already be alluded to in an omen text from the reign of Ashurbanipal referring to "horns of Venus", seemingly referencing a common designation of the lunar crescent in Mesopotamian texts. Falk's conclusion that Nana was associated with Venus by Kushans has also been accepted by Michael Shenkar. However, Westenholz stated that she was at no point in time associated with Venus, and her Sogdian depictions with the sun and the moon find a parallel in textual sources pertaining to her Mesopotamian forerunner, which according to her indicates a continuity of astral functions from the second millennium BCE to the first millennium CE.

A further possible astral symbol associated with Nana were the so-called "three pellets", which occur as a decoration of her earrings in Kushan and Sogdian art (for example on a mural from Shahristan) and her scepter on a Chorasmian bowl.

=== Nana as a warlike goddess ===
Due to her frequent portrayals in the company of armed attendants, as well as a tradition of depicting her battling demons, it has been suggested that Nana had a military aspect in Sogdia, though analogous evidence is not available from Bactria. A painting from Panjakent showing Nana fighting demons alongside a hero riding in a chariot is presumed to represent a scene from a hitherto unknown Sogdian myth. In the Khirmantepa ossuary, as well as in the so-called "Hell and Heaven painting" from Panjakent, she might be accompanied by Tish (Tishtrya), a Zoroastrian figure associated with rain. Matteo Compareti suggests they were regarded as a couple, and that images of the pair were an adaptation of the Mesopotamian convention of pairing Nanaya and Nabu documented in sources from the first millennium BCE. Michael Shenkar stresses that the evidence regarding a possible connection between Nana and Tish, which would be exclusive to Sogdian tradition, is not conclusive, though he does accept that he is the deity who most plausibly can be assigned the role of Nana's spouse. He notes that he apparently plays the role of her "guardian" in art. However, in another painting from Panjakent she is instead accompanied by two warlike female figures. It is also possible that she was depicted in the company of armored and armed Vrēšman, the Sogdian form of Vaiśravaṇa.

=== Other possible roles ===
A bronze plaque which supposedly originates in the Laghman valley in Afghanistan might indicate that in post-Kushan Bactria Nana came to be viewed as a goddess linked to nature and vegetation, as a figure depicted on it similar to her in addition to riding on her symbolic lion she is accompanied by flowerpots, her crown is decorated with tulips and she holds a plant stem, but due to the unique character of this work of art and lack of similar evidence from Sogdia this proposal remains speculative.

== Worship ==
Nana was worshiped in Central Asia by various Eastern Iranian groups, including Bactrians, Sogdians and Chorasmians, as well as by the most likely non-Iranian Yuezhi. It remains uncertain when she was introduced to this area. According to Katsumi Tanabe the earliest datable evidence comes from the first century BCE. Harry Falk argues that Nana has no antecedents in Central Asia predating this period. Joan Goodnick Westenholz suggested that the transfer occurred under Parthian rule, and that the cult of Mesopotamian Nanaya was transferred alongside trade routes to Bactria, similarly as it is documented in the case of Susa, Nisa, Palmyra and Hatra in the same period. She noted coinage with depictions of this goddess might have facilitated this process. Michael Shenkar suggests it might have started earlier, during the reign of the Achaemenid dynasty. Daniel T. Potts argues for a date as early as the late third millennium BCE, with Susa, at the time an Elamite city, as the intermediary. He points out that a female figure seated on a lion appears in glyptic art from the Bactria–Margiana Archaeological Complex, despite the absence of these animals from this region, which he argues might reflect transmission from Mesopotamia. Henri-Paul Francfort has evaluated this proposal critically. Shenkar states that the long gap between the BMAC figure and Nana makes Potts' assumption difficult to accept, though he does consider it a possibility that the cultural memory of a goddess depicted riding on a lion might have persisted in the region and facilitated the spread of the cult of Nana.

=== Kushan reception ===
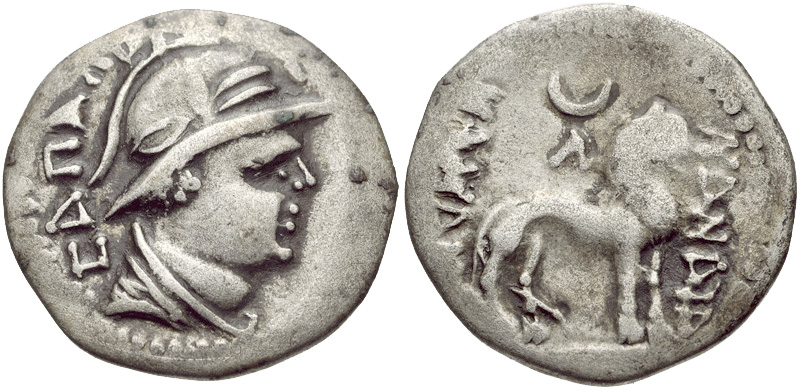
Aniconic representation of Nana on a coin of Sapadbizes.

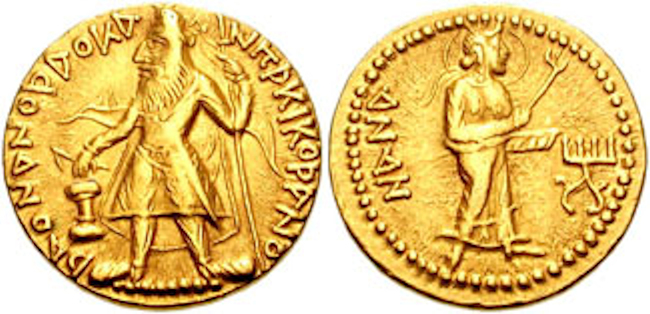
Anthropomorphic Nana on a coin of Kanishka.

The Yuezhi adopted the cult of Nana after settling down in Bactria, and she is already mentioned on the coins of Sapadbizes (c. 20 BCE). The earliest examples are aniconic, with depictions of lions accompanied by inscriptions mentioning Nana. She was venerated by the Kushans, one of the member groups of the Yuezhi confederation, as evidenced by the Rabatak inscription of emperor Kanishka, dated to 127 CE, which addresses her as the deity responsible for granting him kingship. In this context she appears alongside Umma, "highest" or "supreme", in this context possibly to be understood as a title Ardoxsho (APΔOXϷO), a Kushan deity associated with prosperity whose name can be translated as "the good Ashi". It is not certain if these deities were the most commonly worshiped in his empire as a whole, in Bactria alone, or if they only headed an official dynastic pantheon. Nana also appears on the coins of Kanishka. During his reign she came to be depicted in anthropomorphic form for the first time. She continued to appear on coins minted by other Kushan rulers, including Huvishka, Vasudeva I and either Kanishka II or Kanishka III.

Not much is known about Kushan religious practice overall, as few native epigraphical sources are available and historiographical literature compiled by their contemporaries further south in India shows limited, if any, interest in Kushan beliefs and customs. According to Harry Falk it is possible that a festival dedicated to Nana was celebrated annually, though this proposal relies on a reinterpretation of a text from the reign of Huvishka which according to earlier translations does not mention this goddess.

=== Sogdian reception ===
Traders traveling across the Silk Road brought the worship of Nana further east, to Sogdia. Joan Goodnick Westenholz noted that this resulted in a change in the most widespread form of patronage of her cult, with merchants replacing rulers. The Sogdians adopted her Kushan iconography, and she is considered the primary case of iconographic unity between Kushan and Sogdian art. According to Katsumi Tanabe, the coins of Huvishka in particular offer a close parallel to Sogdian depictions of Nana. She is considered an outlier among Sogdian deities as due to distinct, consistent iconography she can be easily identified in art even in absence of accompanying textual evidence. She became the supreme deity in the Sogdian pantheon. Theophoric names invoking her predominated in the Sogdian onomasticon. 29 different names invoking her have been identified as of 2007. Nanai-vandak, "servant of Nana" was particularly popular, with 19 known individuals bearing it, which makes it the second most common Sogdian name overall. Other examples include Nanai-farn, Nanai-thvār, Nanai-khsay, Nanayak and Nanai (the theonym itself used as a theophoric name).

The cult of Nana was associated with Panjakent, which was likely regarded as her sacred city. A temple dedicated to her existed in this location. It has been identified by researchers with the structure designated as "Temple II" during excavations, where fragments of two figures of the goddess have been discovered. It was most likely originally established in the early fifth century. The last local ruler, Divashtich, seemingly permitted it to mint its own coins, and as a result the coinage from the city minted between 709 and 722 refer to Nana as the "lady of Panč" (Panjakent). Similar religious statements are not otherwise attested on Sogdian coins. Multiple representations of Nana have been identified on the Panjakent murals, for example in a mourning scene from her temple and in various paintings which originally decorated private houses.

It is not clear if Nana was equally commonly worshiped in other Sogdian cities as in Panjakent. Reconstruction of local Sogdian traditions is complicated by the fact that most Sogdian religious texts come from the Tarim Basin, rather than the Sogdian heartland, and often reflect Manichaean, Buddhist or Christian theology, rather than presumably widespread native beliefs, typically described in scholarship as "Sogdian Zoroastrianism" or simply "Sogdian religion". Inhabitants of each Sogdian city-state might have ascribed different importance to individual deities. On this basis Michael Shenkar argues that while known all across Sogdia, Nana was not equally popular in every region, and her importance in Panjakent was unique.

A painting of a four-armed Sogdian goddess riding on a lion presumed to be Nana has been discovered in Bunjikat, and it is possible she was commonly worshiped in this city as well. Katsumi Tanabe has additionally proposed that the main goddess worshiped in a temple according to the Syriac version of Pseudo-Callisthenes constructed in Samarkand in the seventh century was also Nana. A further house of worship dedicated to her might have been located at the Jartepa-II site on the ancient road from Samarkand to Panjakent, identified by excavators as an "extramural sanctuary", possibly created for merchants and pilgrims traveling to Nana's temple in Panjakent. Despite her overall prominence, Nana is absent from Sogdian materials from Bukhara discovered so far. It is also known that Sogdian Manichaeans rejected the worship of Nana, apparently due to ritual lamentations it involved.

Sogdian letters indicate that Nana and the river god Oxus were the deities most commonly worshiped by Sogdian merchants operating in the proximity of the Indus River. Furthermore, she was venerated by the Sogdians living in China. Next to Mithra, Rām, (Note: Rām is only attested in Sogdian personal names, and is presumed to be a non-Zoroastrian Iranian deity.) Buddha and Jesus (Note: In this context most likely to be understood as a Manichaean, rather than Christian, figure.) she is one of the best attested figures invoked in their theophoric names identified in Chinese texts from Turfan. A "Sino-Sogdian" depiction of her has been identified on the so-called Miho funerary couch, where she appears in the company of two female celestial musicians. However, it remains unique, and no other representations of her are known from other Sogdian artifacts from China.

=== Other attestations ===
Nana was also worshiped in Chorasmia. She is the only deity identified with certainty in Chorasmian art. She is chiefly known from depictions on silver bowls, which show close similarities with Sogdian art, and might indicate that she played an analogous role in local beliefs as she did in Sogdia. She might have served as the tutelary deity of a hitherto unidentified Chorasmian city.

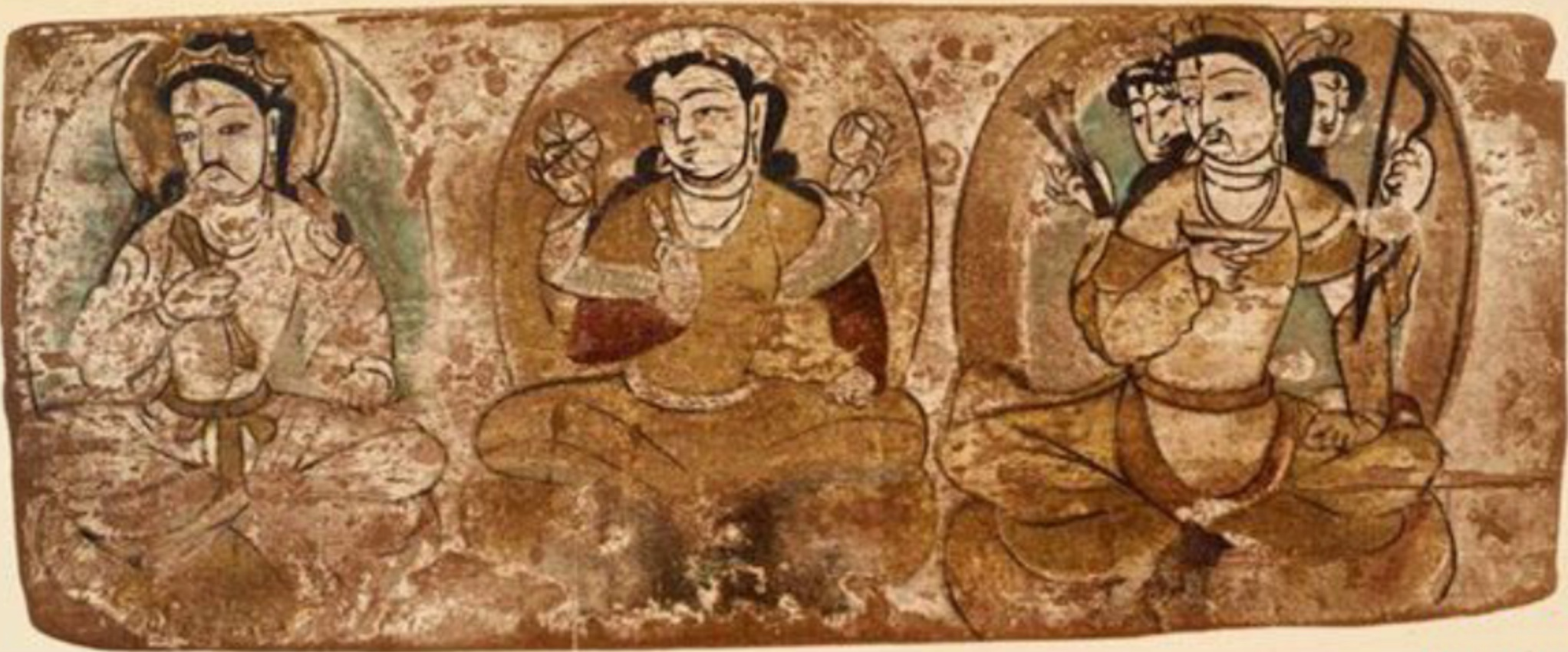
A painting of Sogdian deities, including Nana (center), from Dandan Oilik.

From Sogdia Nana spread even further east, as evidenced by art from Khotan, in which she continued to be depicted up to the ninth or tenth century. An example is a painting from a Buddhist shrine excavated in Dandan Oilik, which shows her in the company of two other figures of Sogdian origin, three-headed trident-armed Weshparkar and a three-eyed deity described by Michael Shenkar as "Indra-Āδβāγ-Ahura Mazdā", Āδβāγ ("the great god") being an epithet applied in Sogdian Buddhist texts to Indra but possibly originally serving as a way to avoid using the name of Ahura Mazda due to a religious taboo. Further possible Khotanese depictions of Nana resembling her Sogdian portrayals have been identified in the collection of the State Hermitage Museum, including an unusual painting depicting her as naked.

=== Uncertain attestations ===
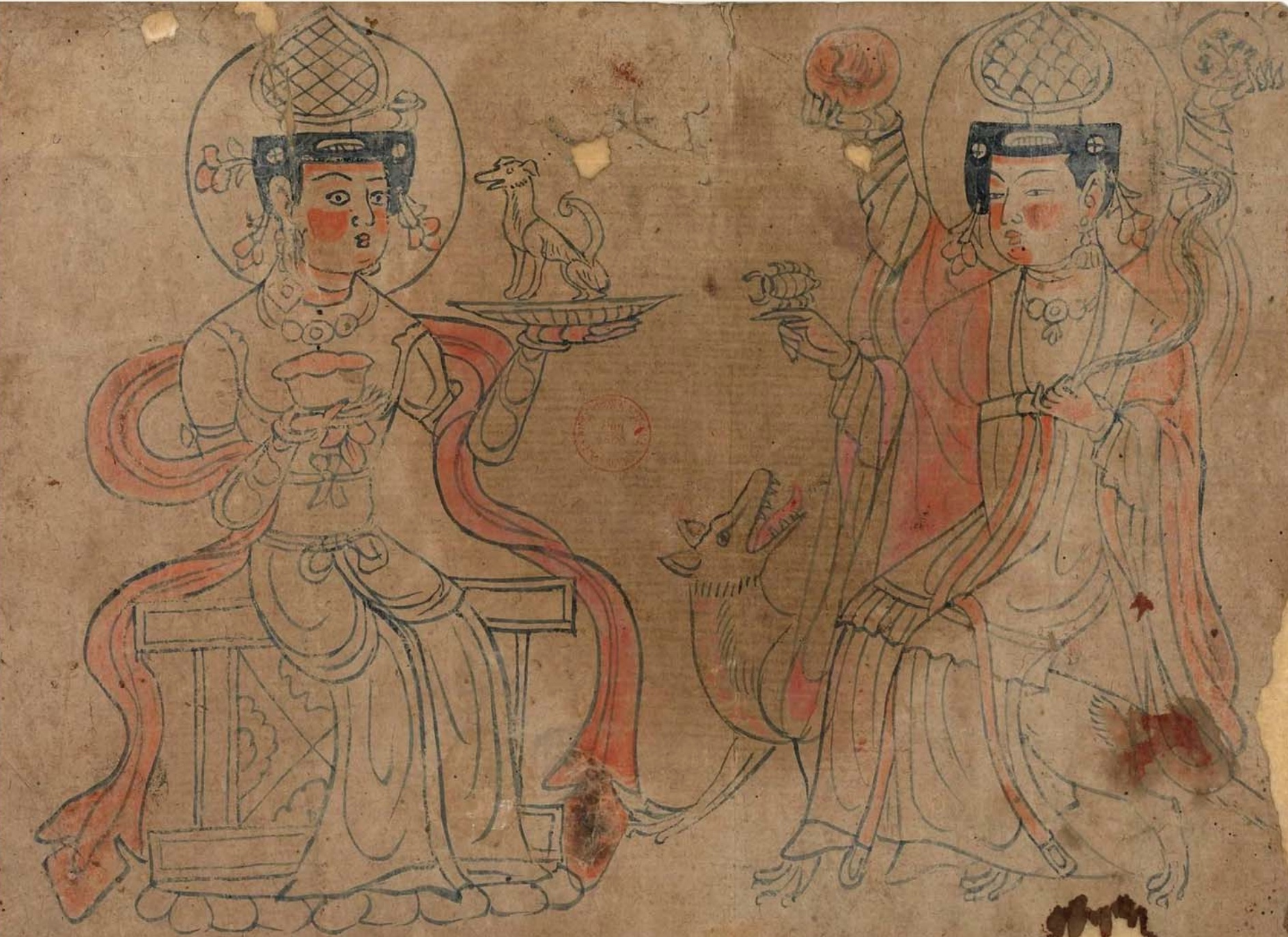
A possible depiction of Nana (right) from the Mogao Caves.

Depictions of Nana have been compared with the right figure on the drawing "Sogdian Daēnās" from the Mogao Caves in Dunhuang, which despite the conventional title assigned to it might depict Uyghur figures. While first published by Jao Tsong-yi in 1978, this work of art only attracted attention among researchers after Jiang Boqin proposed in 1988 that one of the two seated figures is Nana. Lilla Russell-Smith notes that the interpretation of the two figures as her and Tish, the latter in this case dressed as a woman, has been suggested. She concludes that more research is necessary to determine if a feminine form of Tish, supposedly also attested on Kushan coins depicting this deity similarly to Greek Artemis, was worshiped in central Asia. However, she rules out the identification of one of the figures with Nana due to absence of her usual symbolic animal, the lion, and the presence of multiple animals she was never associated with, including a wolf, a scorpion and a snake. Frantz Grenet and Zhang Guangda stress that the figures have no exact iconographic parallels elsewhere, and propose identifying the left one as the Sogdian form of Zoroastrian Dēn (Daena), the personification of conscience who welcomed souls on the Chinvat Bridge. They highlight similarities between the right figure and Nana, and assume that due to the opposition to the worship of Nana among Sogdian Manichaeans, her iconography might have been adopted to represent the "bad Dēn", who waited for the souls of sinners. Michael Shenkar has more recently described the characterization of the Nana-like figure as bad Dēn in the guise of this goddess as "interesting but not confirmed". Ultimately there is no consensus regarding the identity of either figure.

It has been proposed that a Zoroastrian shrine dedicated to Nana, possibly locally referred to as Nantaihou (那那女主; "queen Nana") existed in Gaochang in the 5th century. However, this hypothesis depends on the reinterpretation of a colophon conventionally understood as a reference to a Buddhist shrine of a local empress dowager instead. According to Rong Xinjiang, the evidence is insufficient to abandon the consensus view.
