= Surkh Kotal =

Archaeological site in Afghanistan

Coordinates: 36°02′9.9″N 68°35′20.58″E

Surkh Kotal

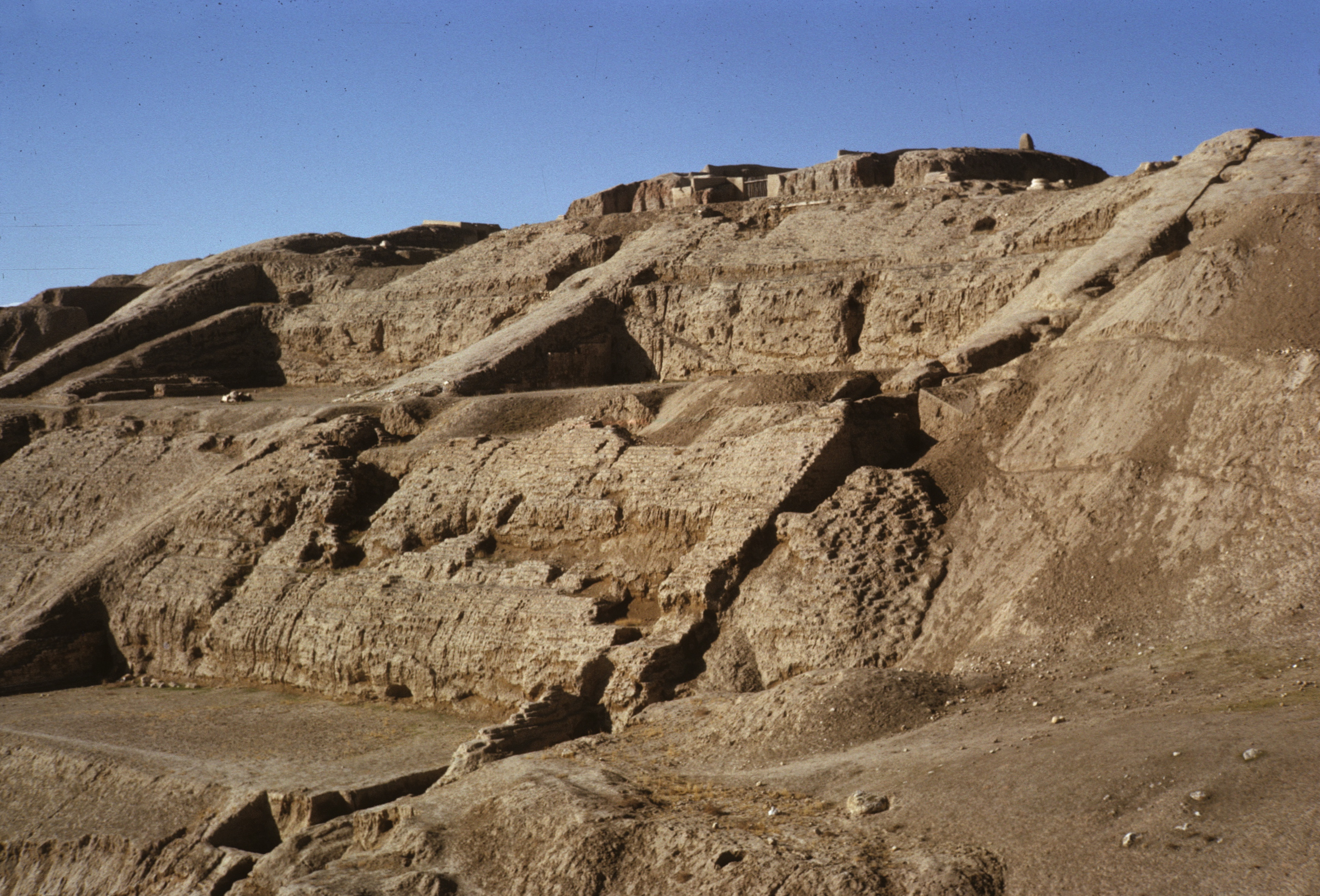
Surkh Kotal archaeological site

Location of Surkh Kotal
Surkh Kotal (South Asia)
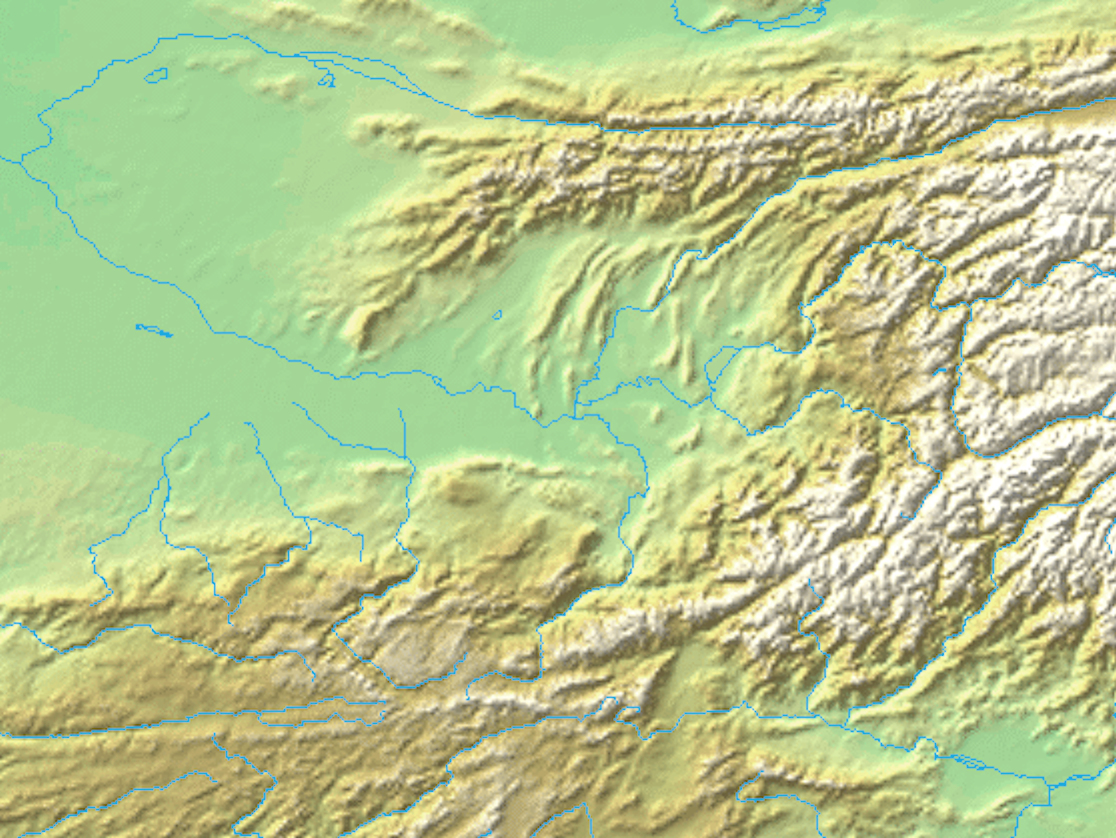
Surkh Kotal (Bactria)
Surkh Kotal (Afghanistan)

Surkh Kotal (Persian: چشمه شیر Chashma-i Shir; also called Sar-i Chashma, is an ancient archaeological site located in the southern part of the region of Bactria, about 18 kilometres (11 mi) north of the city of Puli Khumri, the capital of Baghlan Province of Afghanistan. It is the location of monumental constructions made during the rule of the Kushans. Huge temples, statues of Kushan rulers and the Surkh Kotal inscription, which revealed part of the chronology of early Kushan emperors (also called Great Gara) were all found there. The Rabatak inscription which gives remarkable clues on the genealogy of the Kushan dynasty was also found in the Robatak village just outside the site.

The site of Surkh Kotal, excavated between 1952 and 1966 by Prof. Schlumberger of the Délégation Archéologique Française en Afghanistan, is the main site excavated of the Kushan Empire. Some of the site's sculptures were transferred to the National Museum of Afghanistan (also known as the 'Kabul Museum'), the rest of the site was completely looted during the Afghan Civil War. The most famous artifacts of this site are the Surkh Kotal inscriptions, the statue of King Kanishka and the fire altar. The statue of the king was destroyed during the Taliban wave of iconoclasm in February–March 2001, but has been restored by French conservationists. The three artifacts are currently on display in the Afghan National Museum.

== The ancient name of the site ==
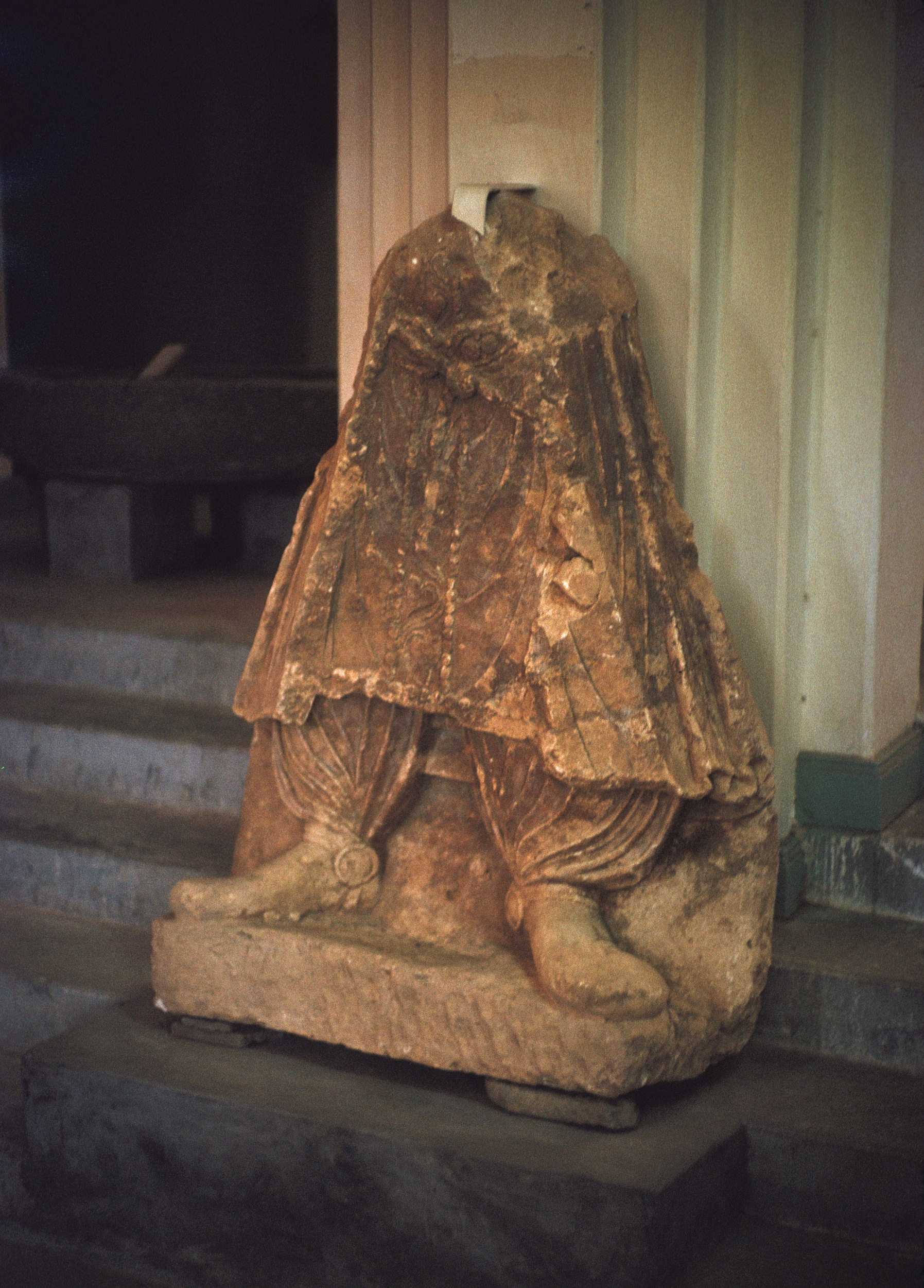
Probable statue of Kanishka, Surkh Kotal, 2nd century CE. Kabul Museum.

The current, well-established name for the site was given to it by the French team of archaeologists headed by M. Schlumberger that originally surveyed the remains. This is not its ancient name, but is instead the modern name for the hills upon which it sits.

An ancient name for the site has been put forward by W. B. Henning and J. D. M. Derrett based on a word in fragments of text found in situ that reads ΒΑΓΟΛΑΓΓΟ “bagolaggo", which resembles the current name of a nearby city and region, Baghlan. Though the script of the text is based on Greek, the language concerned is unknown, so it is unclear whether the word is the name of the site or a word for something else. Henning and Derrett propose that this language is likely to be the local Iranian dialect, and compare the word with the Old Iranian baga-danaka, meaning "temple/sanctuary".

Another possibility as to the ancient name of the site is Varnu - of or related to Varena, the kingdom where the Iranian mythical king Fereydun from the Pishdadian dynasty, is from. This mythical city has been described as having four corners (just like the rockbed site here) and its presumed location fits with where Surkh Kotal is located, particularly with how it is perched above a plateau. Furthermore, this position/location is also similar to that of the high rock, to which the inhabitants of the city of Bazira (in present day, the nearby Barikot in Pakistan) fled in the wake of Alexander the Great's assault on their city during his crusades in the eastern Iran. Indeed, the ancient Greek historian Arrian mentions that the citizens of Bazira fled their fortified city and retreated to a highland rock in the region. Alexander besieged the city from the south, so their northwestern retreat into the mountains and the convenient location of Varnu across the Bactrian plain makes sense. This site can also potentially be linked to the ancient city of Aornos, which is the highland rockbed where Bessus took refuge during his flight from Alexander the Great in the later Sogdian and Bactrain (Bactria is the area with capital city of Balkh, near which Surkh Kotal is located) and regional rebellions. However, there are several hypotheses as to where exactly in the region this ancient city is actually located.

== The inscriptions ==
Here are translations of the inscriptions from Surkh Kotal by J. Harmatta. They were originally in the Bactrian language and written in Greek script. For possible interpretations of their meanings, see Harmatta's article.:

=== Inscription SK2 ===
The "unfinished inscription" (SK2) has been translated as:

"Era-year 299, on the 9th [day] of [month] Dios, King of Kings Ooëmo Takpiso, the majesty, the Kuṣāṇa, had the canal d[ug here]."

Unfortunately, the fragments of an inscription from the period of Kanishka's reign contain only about one fifth (124 letters altogether) of the original inscription. They have been translated as:

the lord, K[ing of Kings], the mighty Kaneṣko . . .]

[in the] first [era ye]ar T [an officer of the king] c[ame] here.

Then [this stronghold and the sanctuary] were built by him in four years.

[And] when the st[rongho]ld was com[pleted, then this fa]çade [and] the stairs l[eading th]ere [were built by him. Moreover, the canal was wh]olly bu[tressed with stones so that p[ure water was [provid]ed [by him in the can]al for the ab[ode of the gods. Thus he] to[ook care of the sanctuary].

[Moreover, this stronghold and the canal were built by So-and-So by the order of the king]. Then So-and-So inscribed this façade and the stairs leading there.

=== The "Surkh Kotal inscription" (SK4) ===
The text of SK 4 (A, B, M) runs:

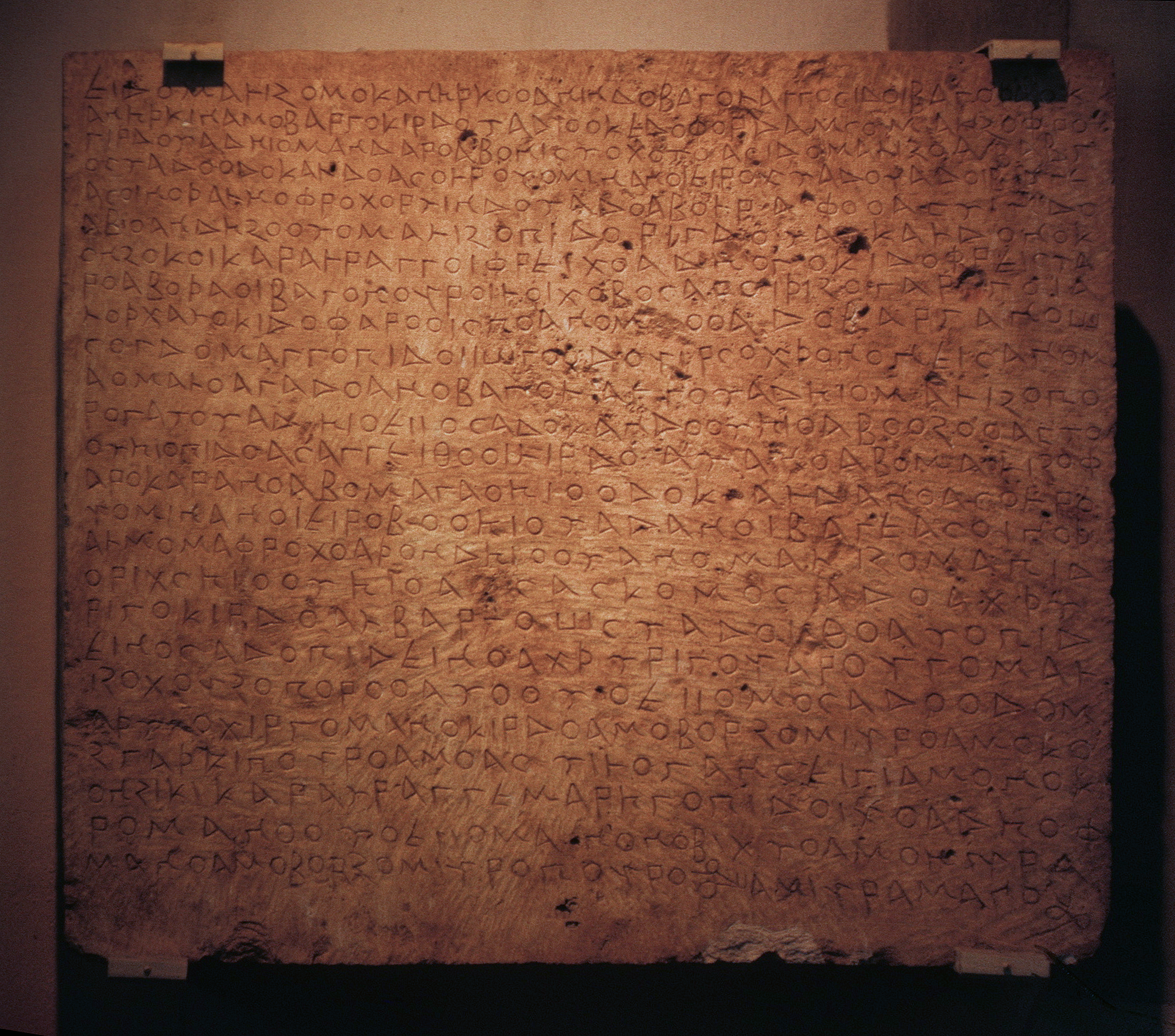
The Surkh Kotal inscription (SK4) is the first known substantial document written in Bactrian, an Iranian language. It uses the Greek script. Time of Huvishka, 2nd century CE.

Translation

This stronghold is the 'Kaneṣko' Oanindo sanctuary which the lord king made the namebearer of Kaneṣko.

At that time when the stronghold was first completed, then its inner water to drink was missing, therefore the stronghold was without water. And when the water-flow disappeared from the canal, then the gods wished themselves away from the abode. Then they were led to Lrafo, [namely] to Andēzo. Afterwards the stronghold became abandoned.

Then, when Nokonzoko, the karalrango, the king's favourite who is much devoted towards the king, Son of God, the patron, the benefactor, the merciful as well, who wishes glory, all-winning strength from pure heart, came here to the sanctuary in the 31st Era-year, in the month Nīsān, then he took care of the stronghold. Then he had a well dug, thus he provided water. Thereafter he buttressed [the well] with stones so that the fine, pure water should not be missing for the stronghold. And when for them the water-flow would disappear from the canal, even then the gods, should not wish themselves away from their abode, thus the stronghold should not become abandoned for them.

Moreover, he appointed an inspector over the well, he placed a helper there, so that a separate [inspector] took good care of the well and a separate inspector of the whole stronghold.

Moreover, this well and the façade were made by Xirgomano, the karalrango, by the order of the king. [B: Moreover, this well was made by Borzomioro, son of Kozgaṣko, citizen of Hastilogan, attendant of Nokonziko, the karalrango, by order of the king.]

Moreover, Eiiomano inscribed [this] together with Mihramano, the son of Bozomihro [Device 5] jointly [Device 2]. (A: Device 1 jointly, Device 2, B: Liiago, Device 3, Adego, Device 4).

=== Other inscriptions ===
Apparently the main architect of the Surkh Kotal temple was a Greek named Palamedes. There is a Greek inscription which could be read as: ΔΙΑ ΠΑΛΑΜΕΔΟΥΣ, i.e. dia Palamedous, meaning "through or by Palamedes". This proves that Hellenistic populations still remained in the region up into the Kushan era.

== Architectural elements ==
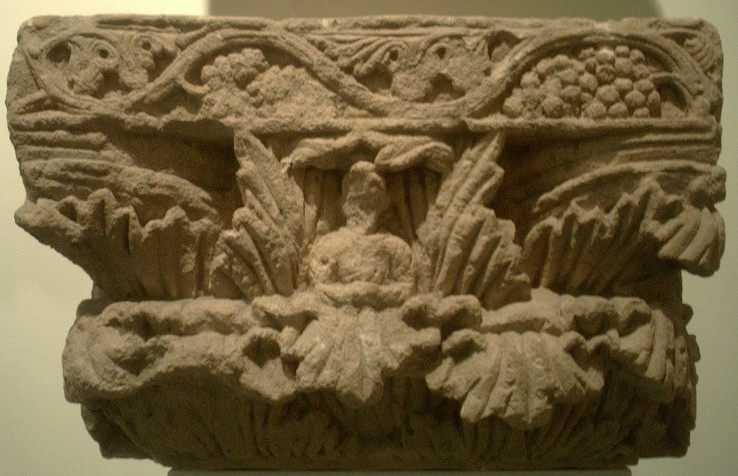
Indo-Corinthian capital from Surkh Kotal, with central Buddha figure.

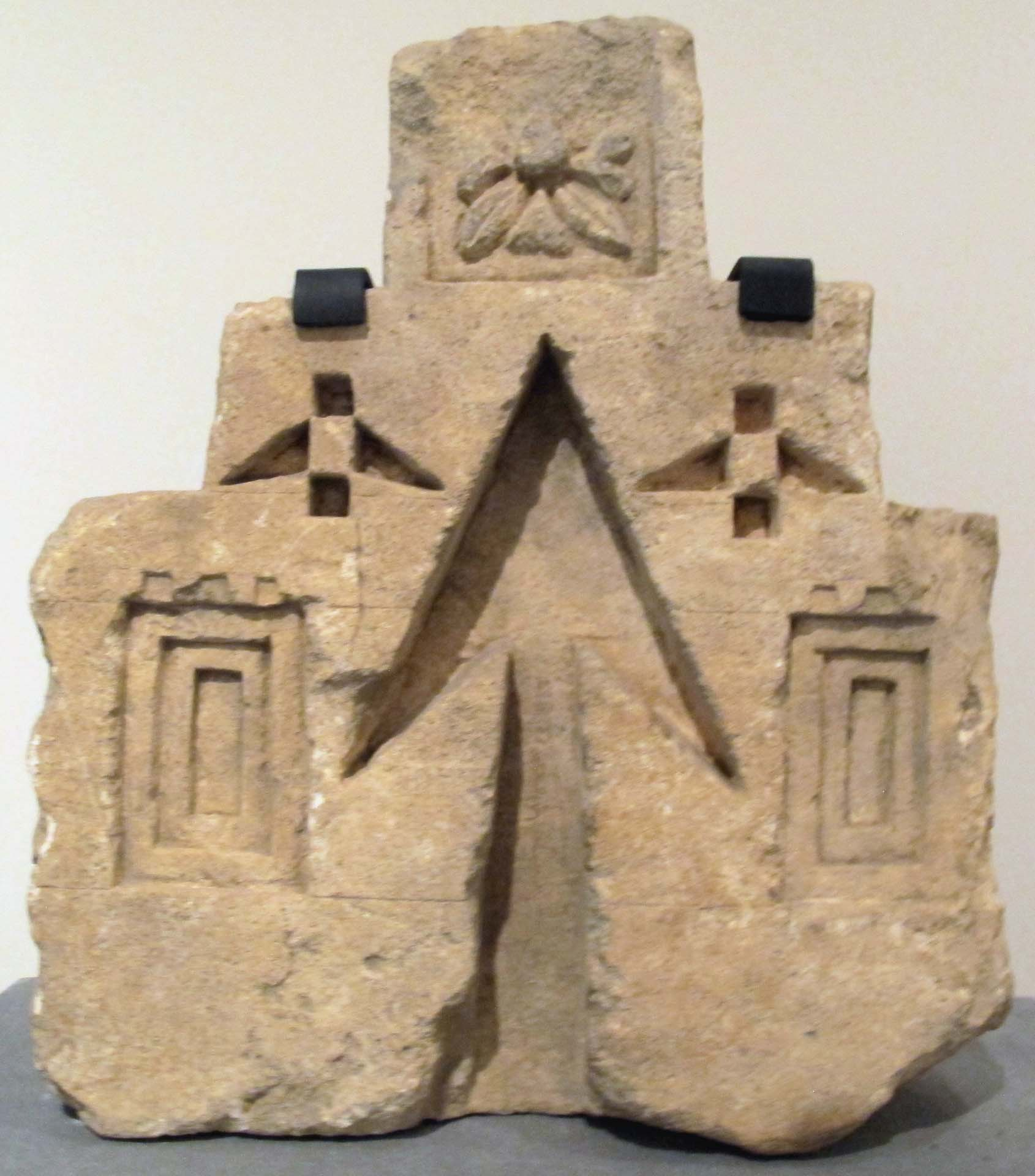
Merlon in the shape of an arrow

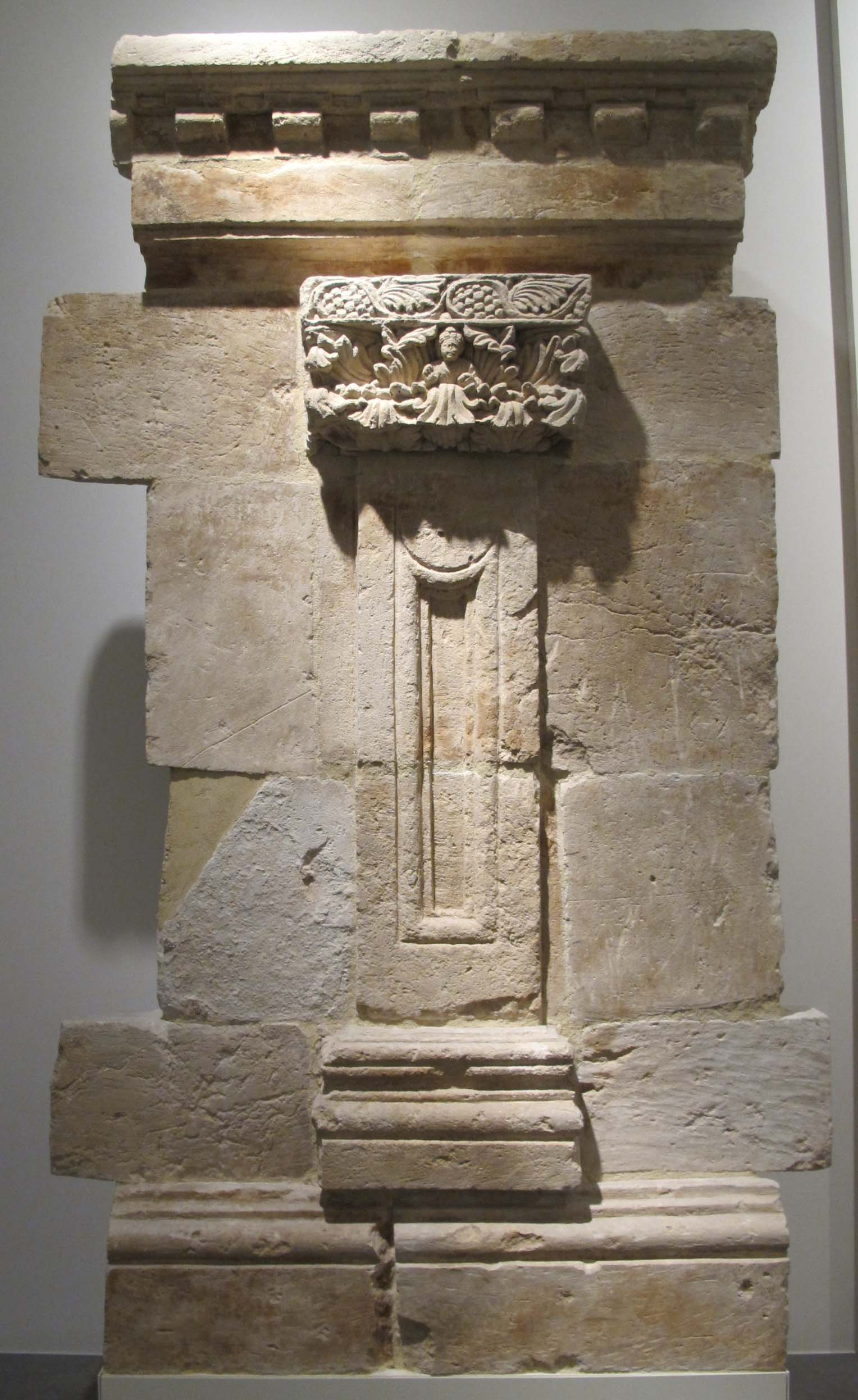
Hellenistic-inspired Decorated pillar

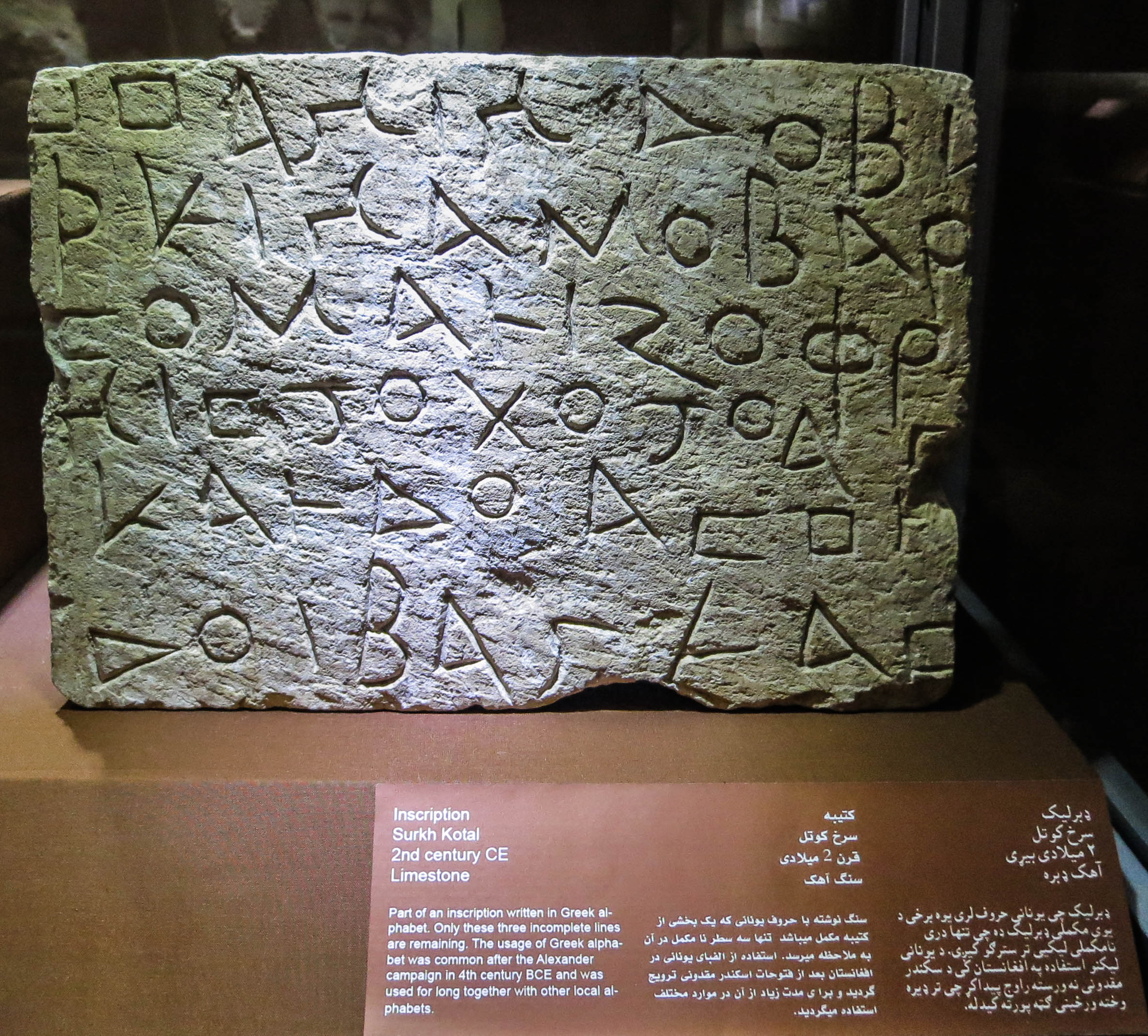
Surkh Kotal inscription in Bactrian Greek script, National Museum of Afghanistan

== See also ==
- Mundigak — archaeological site in Kandahar Province
- Hadda — archaeological site in Nangarhar Province
- Mes Aynak — archaeological site in Logar Province
- Takht-i-Bahi — archaeological site in Mardan
- Mehrgarh — archaeological site in Bolan
- Sheri Khan Tarakai — archaeological site in Bannu
- Rabatak inscription
