= Sho (letter) =

Letter of the Bactrian alphabet

The letter Ϸ, sometimes called sho or san, was a letter added to the Greek alphabet in order to write the Bactrian language. It was similar in appearance to the Old English and Icelandic letter thorn ⟨þ⟩, which has typically been used to represent it in modern print, although they are historically unrelated. It probably represented a sound similar to English ⟨sh⟩ [ʃ]. Its conventional transliteration in Latin is ⟨š⟩.

Its original name and position in the Bactrian alphabet, if it had any, are unknown. Some authors have called it san, on the basis of the hypothesis that it was a survival or reintroduction of the archaic Greek letter san (Ϻ). In its Bactrian form, the letter ⟨Ϸ⟩ closely resembles, perhaps coincidentally, the letter ⟨𐊮⟩ of the Greek-based Carian alphabet which may have also stood for [ʃ]. The name sho was coined for the letter for purposes of modern computer encoding in 2002, on the basis of analogy with rho ⟨ρ⟩, the letter with which it seems to be graphically related. Uppercase ⟨Ϸ⟩ and lowercase ⟨ϸ⟩ were added to Unicode in version 4.0 (2003), the case distinction being made to aid its use in modern typography.

- U+03F7 Ϸ GREEK CAPITAL LETTER SHO
- U+03F8 ϸ GREEK SMALL LETTER SHO

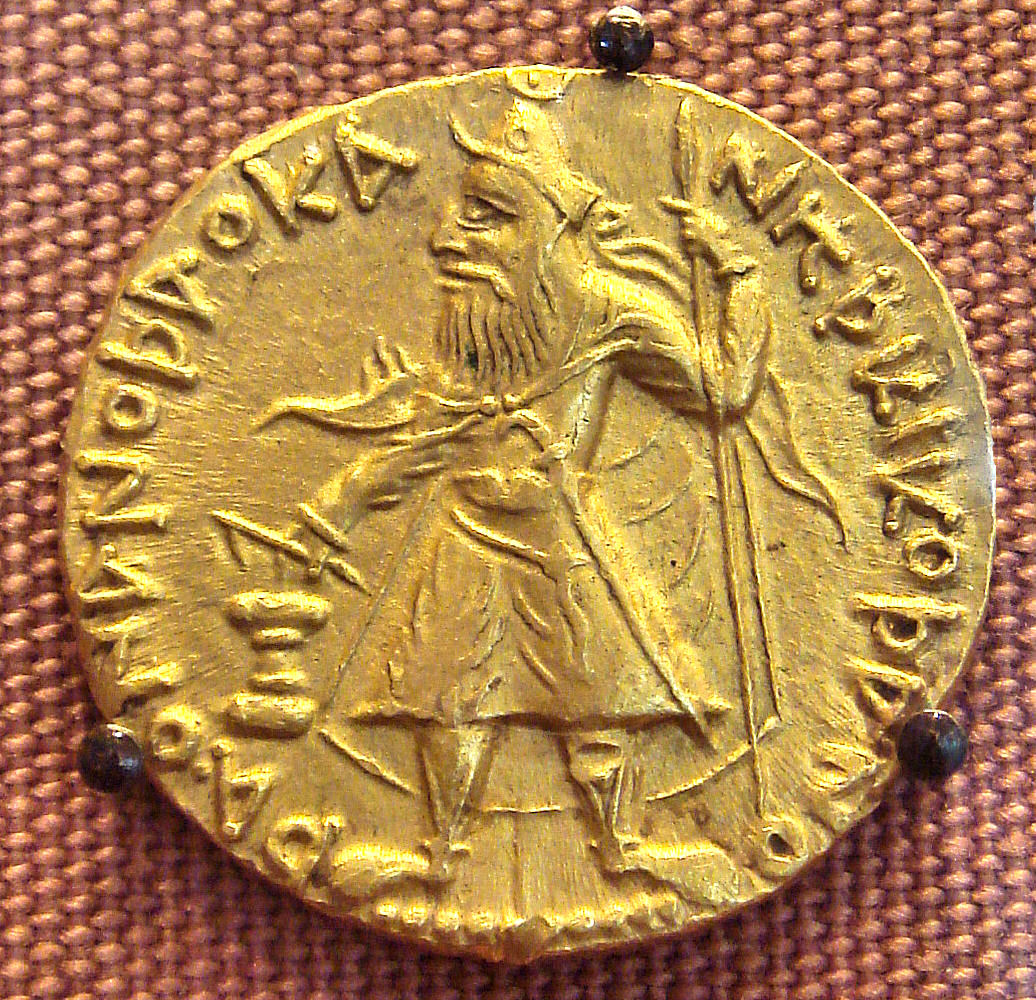
Coin of king Kanishka, with the inscription ϷΑΟΝΑΝΟϷΑΟ ΚΑΝΗϷΚΙ ΚΟϷΑΝΟ (šaonanošao kanēški košano): "King of Kings, Kanishka the Kushan".

Bactrian Ϸ in three different historical writing styles, and in a modern font.
