= Bactrian language =

Extinct Eastern Iranian language of Asia

Bactrian
- Αριαο, Παχλό
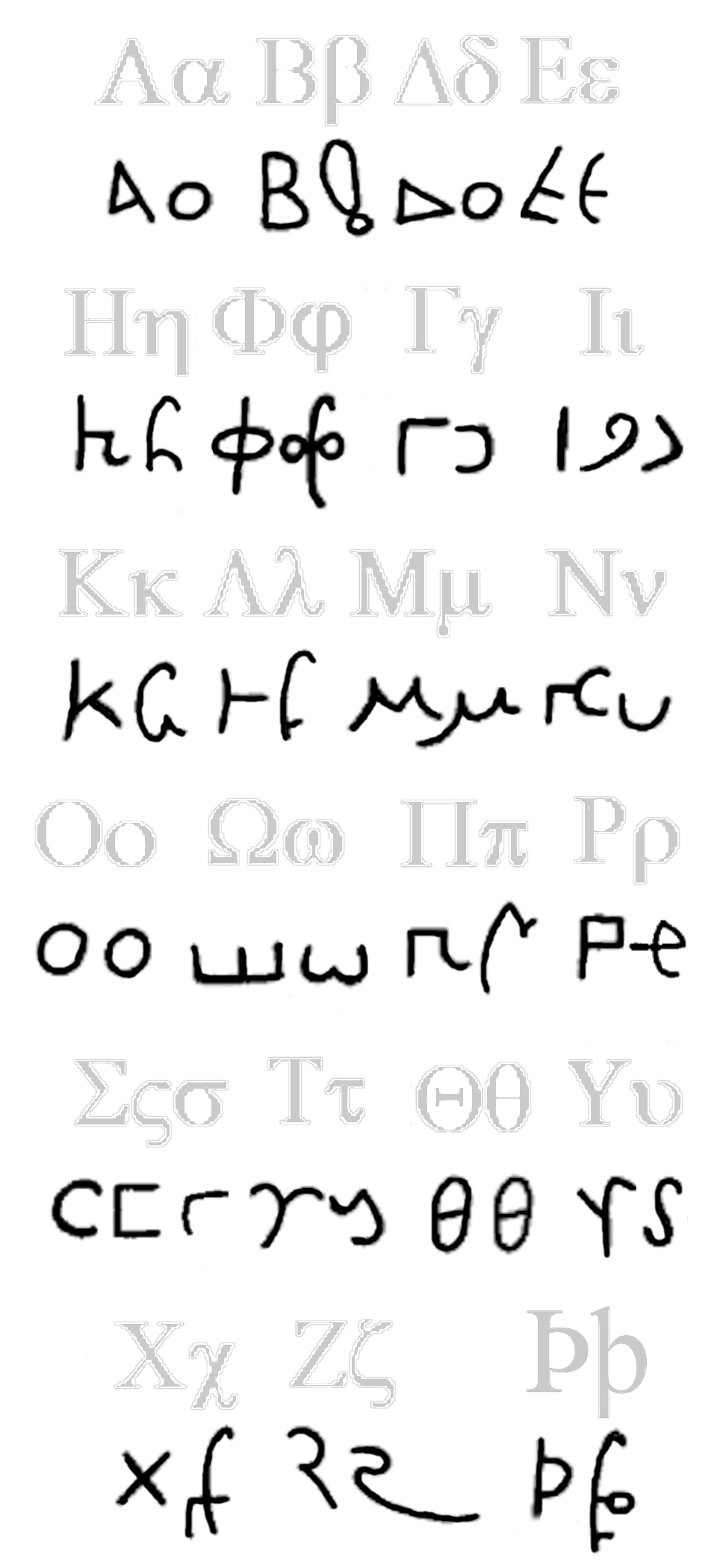
- The Bactrian alphabet (block and cursive letters, here in black). The Bactrian script was directly adapted from the Greek script (here in grey), with the addition of the letter sho (ϸ).
- Pronunciation: [arjaː], [Paxloː]
- Native to: Bactria
- Region: Central Asia
- Era: 300 BC – 1000 AD
- Language family: Indo-European: Indo-Iranian; Iranian; Northeastern; Sogdo-Bactrian; Bactrian
- Writing system: Bactrian script (Greek); Manichaean script

Official status
- Official language in: Kushan Empire; Hephthalite Empire

Language codes
- ISO 639-3: xbc
- Glottolog: bact1239
- Bactrian is an Extinct language according to the classification system of the UNESCO Atlas of the World's Languages in Danger

Bactrian (Bactrian: Αριαο, romanized: ariao [arjaː], meaning "Aryan"), concurrently referred to as (Bactrian: Παχλό, romanized: Paxlo [paxloː], meaning "Bactrian") was an Eastern Iranian language formerly spoken in the Central Asian region of Bactria (some regions of present-day Afghanistan, Pakistan, and Tajikistan) and used as the official language of the Kushan and the Hephthalite empires.

== Name ==
It's speculated that Avestan represented "Old Bactrian", but this notion had "rightly fallen into discredit by the end of the 19th century".

Bactrian, which was written predominantly in an alphabet based on the Greek script, was known natively as αριαο [arjaː] ("Arya"; an endonym common amongst Indo-Iranian peoples). It has also been known by names such as Greco-Bactrian or Kushan or Kushano-Bactrian.

Under Kushan rule, Bactria became known as Tukhara or Tokhara, and later as Tokharistan. When texts in two extinct and previously unknown Indo-European languages were discovered in the Tarim Basin of China, during the early 20th century, they were linked circumstantially to Tokharistan, and Bactrian was sometimes referred to as "Eteo-Tocharian" (i.e. "true" or "original" Tocharian). By the 1970s, however, it became clear that there was little evidence for such a connection. For instance, the Tarim "Tocharian" languages were "centum" languages within the Indo-European family, whereas Bactrian was an Iranian, thus "satem" language.

== Classification ==
Bactrian is a part of the Eastern Iranian languages and shares features with the extinct Middle Iranian languages Sogdian and Khwarezmian (Eastern) and Parthian (Western), as well as sharing a strong affinity with modern Pashto and forming a continuum between it and the Pamir subgroup of languages like Munji and Yidgha. Its genealogical position is unclear. According to another source, the present-day speakers of Munji, the modern Eastern Iranian language of the Munjan Valley in the Kuran wa Munjan district of the Badakhshan province in northeast Afghanistan, display the closest possible linguistic affinity with the Bactrian language.

== History ==
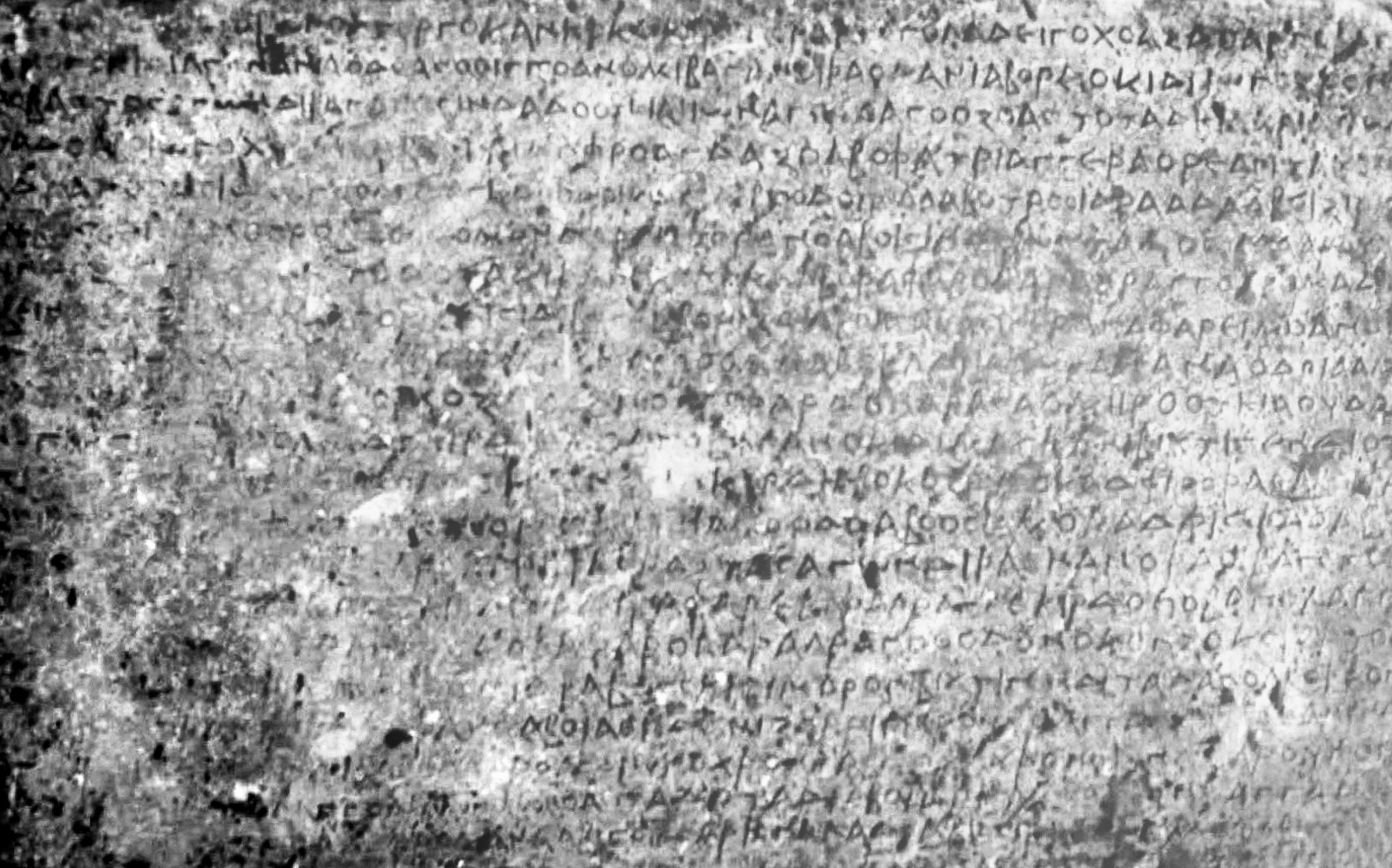
The Rabatak inscription is an inscription written on a rock in the Bactrian language and the Greek script, which was found in 1993 at the site of Rabatak, near Surkh Kotal in Afghanistan. The inscription relates to the rule of the Kushan emperor Kanishka, and gives remarkable clues on the genealogy of the Kushan dynasty.

Bactrian became the lingua franca of the Kushan Empire and the region of Bactria, replacing the Greek language. Bactrian was used by successive rulers in Bactria, until the arrival of the Umayyad Caliphate.

=== Historical development ===
Following the conquest of Bactria by Alexander the Great in 323 BC, for about two centuries Greek was the administrative language of his Hellenistic successors, that is, the Seleucid and the Greco-Bactrian kingdoms. Eastern Scythian tribes (the Saka, or Sacaraucae of Greek sources) invaded the territory around 140 BC, and at some time after 124 BC, Bactria was overrun by a confederation of tribes belonging to the Great Yuezhi and Tokhari. In the 1st century AD, the Kushana, one of the Yuezhi tribes, founded the ruling dynasty of the Kushan Empire.

The Kushan Empire initially retained the Greek language for administrative purposes but soon began to use Bactrian. The Bactrian Rabatak inscription (discovered in 1993 and deciphered in 2000) records that the Kushan king Kanishka (c. 127 AD) discarded Greek ("Ionian") as the language of administration and adopted Bactrian ("Arya language"). The Greek language accordingly vanished from official use and only Bactrian was later attested. The Greek script, however, remained and was used to write Bactrian. The territorial expansion of the Kushans helped propagate Bactrian in other parts of Central Asia and South Western Asia.

In the 3rd century, the Kushan territories west of the Indus River fell to the Sasanians, and Bactrian began to be influenced by Middle Persian. The eastern extent of the Kushan Empire in Northwestern India, was conquered by the Gupta Empire. Besides the Pahlavi script and the Brahmi script, some coinage of this period is still in the Aryo (Bactrian) script.

From the mid-4th century, Bactria and the Indus Velley gradually fell under the control the Hephthalite and other Huna tribes. The Hephthalite period is marked by linguistic diversity; in addition to Bactrian, Middle Persian, Indo-Aryan and Latin vocabulary is also attested. The Hephthalites ruled these regions until the 7th century, when they were overrun by the Umayyad Caliphate, after which official use of Bactrian ceased. Although Bactrian briefly survived in other usage, that also eventually ceased, and the latest known examples of the Bactrian script, found in the Tochi Valley in Pakistan, date to the end of the 9th century.

== Writing system ==
Bactrian was written using the Greek script, with the addition of the letter sho (majuscule: Ϸ, minuscule: ϸ) to represent the /ʃ/ sound.

Among Indo-Iranian languages, the use of the Greek script is unique to Bactrian. Although ambiguities remain, some of the disadvantages were overcome by using upsilon (Υ, υ) for /h/ and by introducing an additional 25th letter sho (Ϸ, ϸ) to represent /ʃ/. Xi (Ξ, ξ) and psi (Ψ, ψ) were not used for writing Bactrian as the ks and ps sequences did not occur in Bactrian. They were, however, probably used to represent numbers (just as other Greek letters were). The Greek writing reproduced the Bactrian phonetics only approximately.

=== Records ===
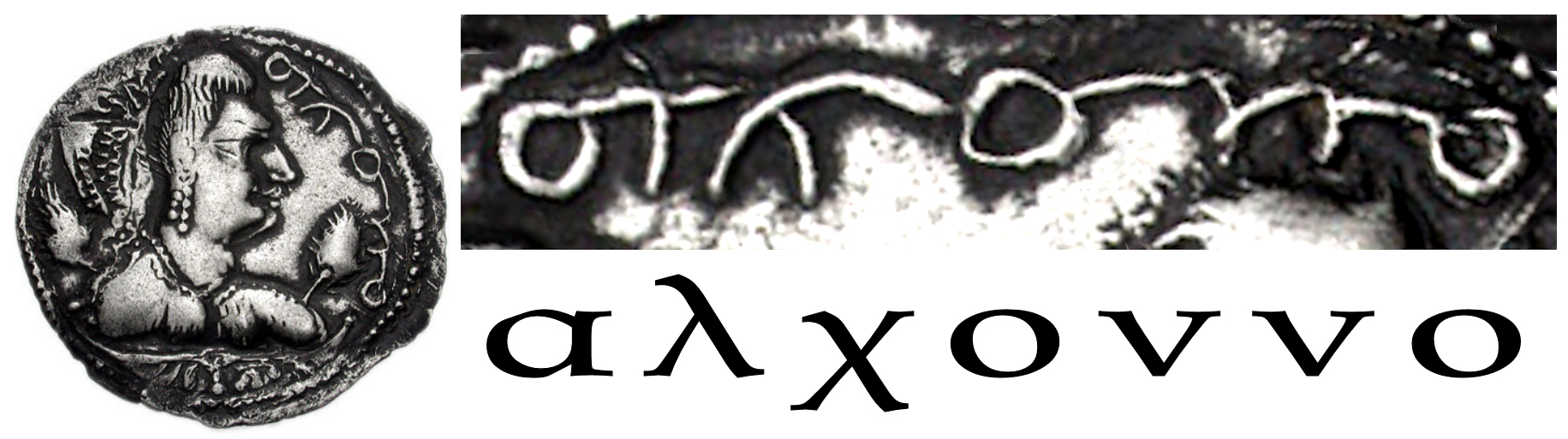
The word αλχοννο (alkhonno) in cursive Bactrian script, on a coin of the Alchon Huns ruler Khingila, 5th century AD.

The Bactrian language is known from inscriptions, coins, seals, manuscripts, and other documents.

Sites at which Bactrian language inscriptions have been found are (in north–south order) Afrasiyab in Uzbekistan; Kara-Tepe, Airtam, Delbarjin, Balkh, Kunduz, Baglan, Ratabak/Surkh Kotal, Oruzgan, Kabul, Dasht-e Navur, Ghazni, Jagatu in Afghanistan; and Islamabad, Kohistan, Shatial Bridge and Tochi Valley in Pakistan. Of eight known manuscript fragments in Greco-Bactrian script, one is from Lou-lan and seven from Toyoq, where they were discovered by the second and third Turpan expeditions under Albert von Le Coq. One of these may be a Buddhist text. One other manuscript, in Manichaean script, was found at Qočo by Mary Boyce in 1958.

Over 150 legal documents, accounts, letters and Buddhist texts have surfaced since the 1990s, the largest collection of which is the Khalili Collection of Aramaic Documents. These have greatly increased the detail in which Bactrian is currently known.

== Phonology ==
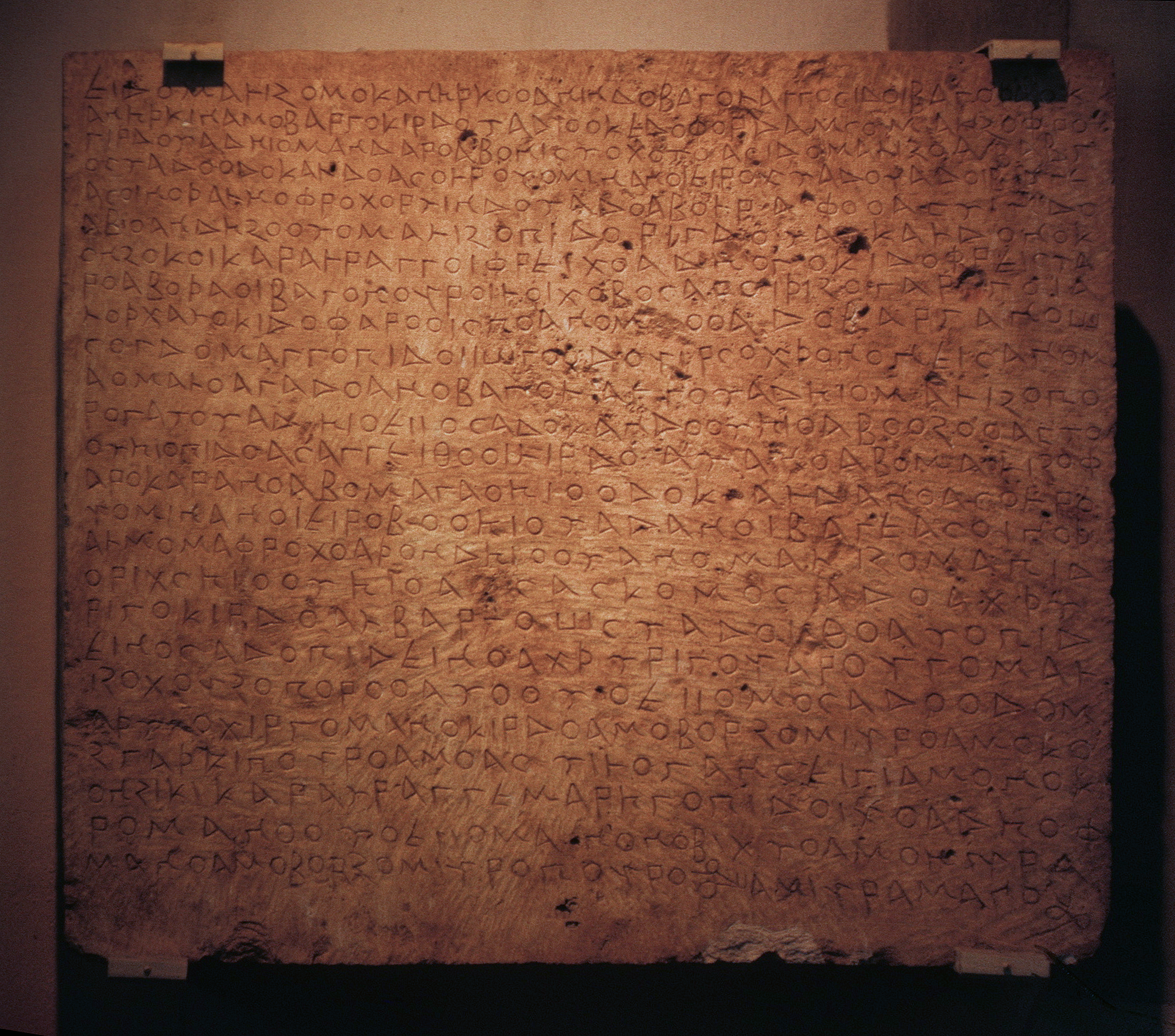
The Surkh Kotal inscription (SK4) is the first known substantial document written in Bactrian, an Iranian language. It uses the Greek script. It was written at the time of the Kushan ruler Huvishka, 2nd century CE. Kabul Museum.

The phonology of Bactrian is not known with certainty, owing to the limitations of the native scripts, and also its status as an extinct language.

=== Consonants ===
Consonants of Bactrian
Type		Labial	Dental or alveolar	Palatal or postalveolar	Velar		Glottal
Type		Labial	Dental or alveolar	Palatal or postalveolar	plain	labialized	Glottal
Stops	Voiceless	p	t		k		
Stops	Voiced	b(?)	d		ɡ		
Affricates	Voiceless		t͡s				
Affricates	Voiced		d͡z				
Fricatives	Voiceless	f	θ(?); s	ʃ	x	xʷ	h
Fricatives	Voiced	v	ð(?); z	ʒ(?)	ɣ		
Nasals		m	n				
Approximants			l	j		w	
Rhotic			r				

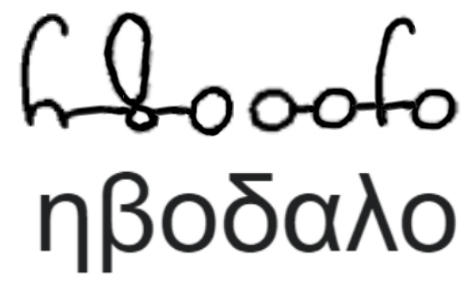
The Hephthalites used the Bactrian script (top). Here, their endonym ηβοδαλο (ēbodalo), "Hephthalites".

A major difficulty in determining Bactrian phonology is that affricates and voiced stops were not consistently distinguished from the corresponding fricatives in the Greek script.

- Proto-Iranian *b, *d, *g have generally become spirants, as in most other Eastern Iranian languages. A distinctive feature of Bactrian, shared within the Iranian languages with Munji, Yidgha and Pashto, is the development of Proto-Iranian *d > *ð further to /l/, which may have been areal in nature. Original *d remains only in a few consonant clusters, e.g. *bandaka > βανδαγο 'servant', *dugdā > λογδο 'daughter'. The clusters /lr/ and /rl/ appear in earlier Bactrian, but revert to /dr/, /rd/ later, e.g. *drauga > λρωγο (4th to 5th century) > δδρωρο (7th to 8th century) 'lie, falsehood'.
- Proto-Iranian *p, *t, *č, *k have become voiced between vowels, and after a nasal consonant or *r.
  - Inside a word, the digraphs ββ, δδ for original voiceless *p, *t can be found, which probably represent [b], [d]. The former is attested only in a single word, αββο 'water'. Manichaean Bactrian appears to only have had /v/ in native vocabulary. According to Gholami, instances of single δ may indicate a fricative pronunciation, [ð].
  - γ appears to stand for both the stop [ɡ] and the fricative [ɣ], but it is unclear if a contrast existed, and which instances are which. Evidence from the Manichaean script suggests that γ from *k may have been /ɡ/ and γ from *g may have been /ɣ/. According to Greek orthographic practices, γγ represents [ŋɡ].
- σ may continue both Proto-Iranian *c > *s and *č, and the Manichaean script confirms that it represents two phonemes, likely /s/ and /ts/.
- ζ may continue similarly on one hand Proto-Iranian *dz > *z, and on the other *ǰ and *č, and it represents at least /z/ and /dz/. This distinction is again confirmed by the Manichaean script. Also a third counterpart of ζ is found in Manichaean Bactrian, possibly representing /ʒ/.

The status of θ is unclear; it only appears in the word ιθαο 'thus, also', which may be a loanword from another Iranian language. In most positions Proto-Iranian *θ becomes /h/ (written υ), or is lost, e.g. *puθra- > πουρο 'son'. The cluster *θw, however, appears to become /lf/, e.g. *wikāθwan > οιγαλφο 'witness'.

ϸ continues, in addition to Proto-Iranian *š, also Proto-Iranian *s in the clusters *sr, *str, *rst. In several cases, however, Proto-Iranian *š becomes /h/ or is lost; the distribution is unclear. E.g. *snušā > ασνωυο 'daughter-in-law', *aštā > αταο 'eight', *xšāθriya > χαρο 'ruler', *pašman- > παμανο 'wool'.

=== Vowels ===
Vowels of Bactrian

Type	Short		
Type	Front	Central	Back
Close	i		u
Mid	e	ə	o?
Open	a		

Type	Long	
Type	Front	Back
Close	iː	uː
Mid	eː	oː
Open	aː	

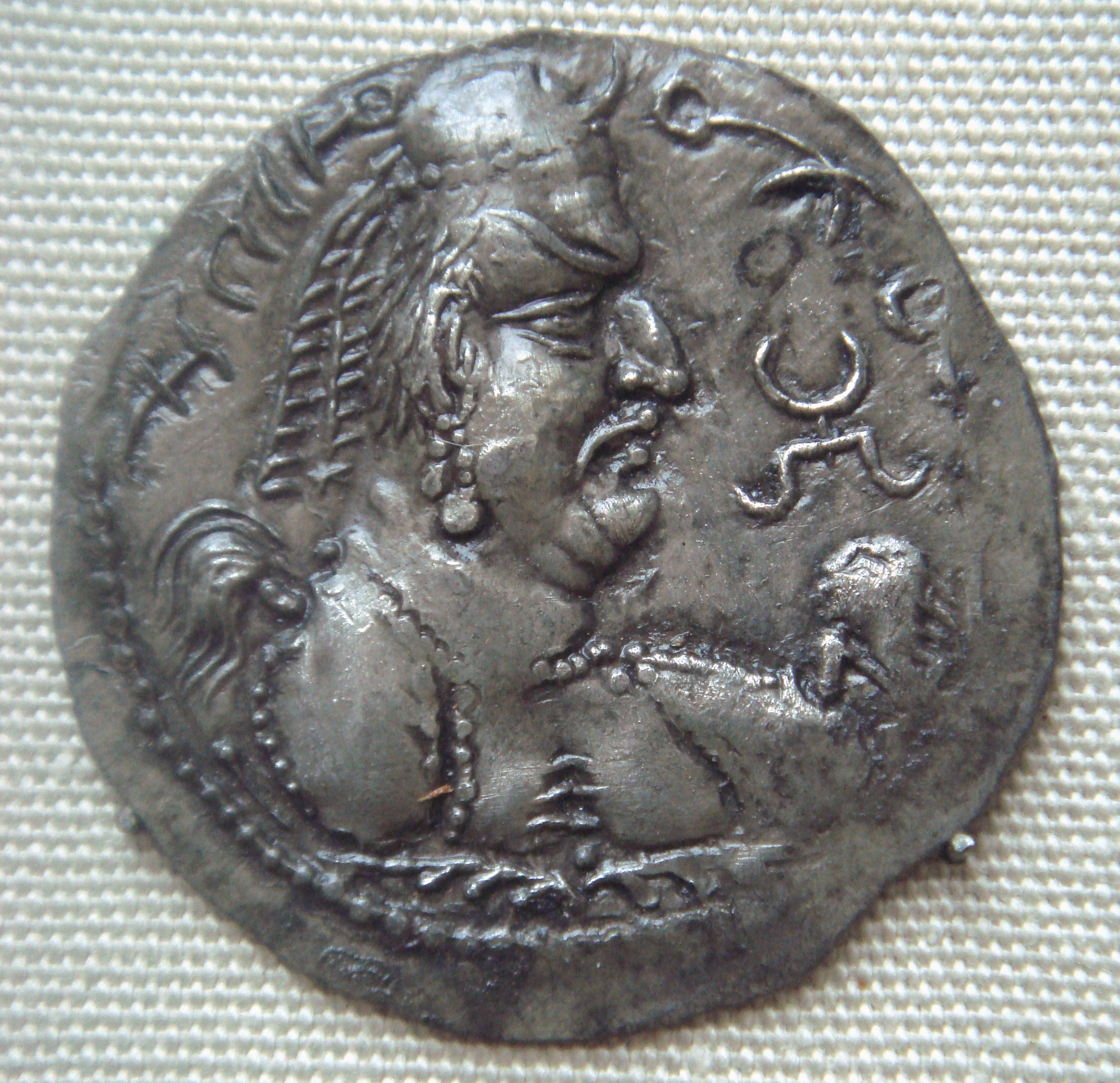
Silver drachm of Alchon Huns ruler Khingila. Bactrian script legend: χιγγιλο αλχοννο khingilo alkhonno, with Alchon tamgha symbol.

The Greek script does not consistently represent vowel length. Fewer vowel contrasts yet are found in the Manichaean script, but short /a/ and long /aː/ are distinguished in it, suggesting that Bactrian generally retains the Proto-Iranian vowel length contrast.

It is not clear if ο might represent short [o] in addition to [u], and if any contrast existed. Short [o] may have occurred at least as a reflex of *a followed by a lost *u in the next syllable, e.g. *madu > μολο 'wine', *pasu > ποσο 'sheep'. Short [e] is also rare. By contrast, long /eː/, /oː/ are well established as reflexes of Proto-Iranian diphthongs and certain vowel-semivowel sequences: η < *ai, *aya, *iya; ω < *au, *awa.

An epenthetic vowel [ə] (written α) is inserted before word-initial consonant clusters.

Original word-final vowels and word-initial vowels in open syllables were generally lost. A word-final ο is normally written, but this was probably silent, and it is appended even after retained word-final vowels: e.g. *aštā > αταο 'eight', likely pronounced /ataː/.

The Proto-Iranian syllabic rhotic *r̥ is lost in Bactrian, and is reflected as ορ adjacent to labial consonants, ιρ elsewhere; this agrees with the development in the western Iranian languages Parthian and Middle Persian.

=== Orthography ===
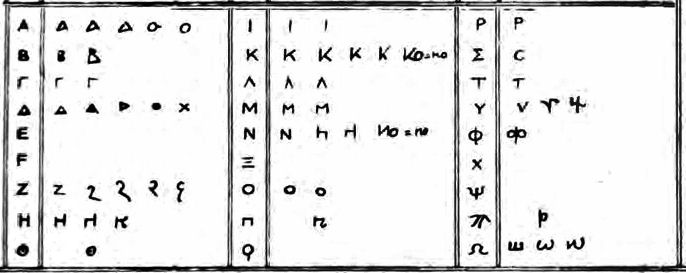
Variations of the Greek alphabet (narrow columns) in the Kushan script (wide columns).

Letter correspondence
Greek Letter	IPA	Greek Letter	IPA	Greek Letter	IPA
α	a, aː	η	eː	ρ	r
α/ο	ə	θ	θ	σ	s, t͡s
β	v	ι	i, j	τ	t
β/ββ	b	κ	k	υ	h
γ	ɣ, ɡ	λ	l	φ	f
δ	ð	μ	m	χ	x
δ/δδ	d	ν	n	χο	xʷ
ε	e	ο	o, u, w	ω	oː
ζ	z, ʒ, d͡z	π	p	ϸ	ʃ

== Examples ==
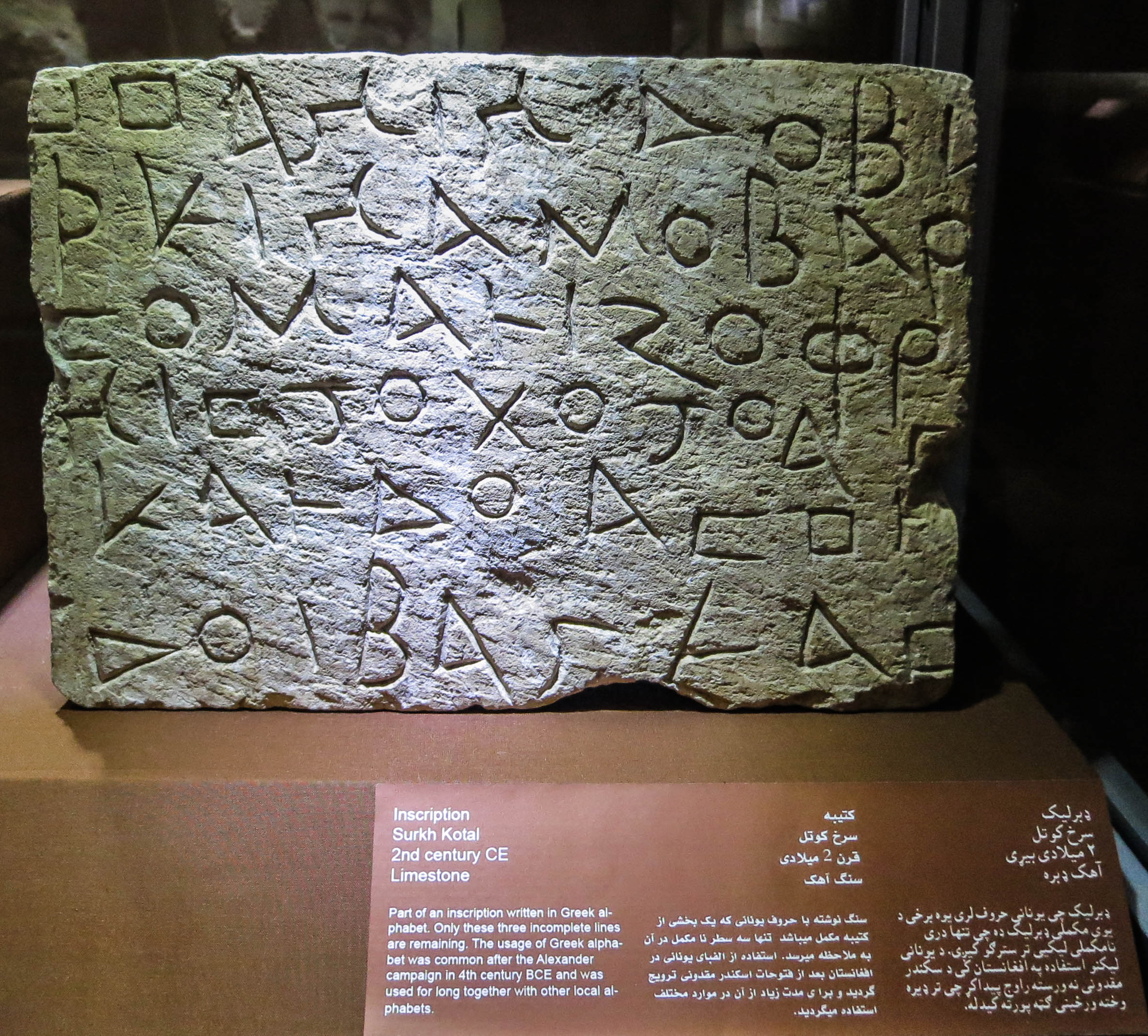
Surkh Kotal inscription in Bactrian, National Museum of Afghanistan

== See also ==
- Kidarites
