= Robatak, Fars =

Robatak رباطك
- Village
- Location within Iran
- Coordinates: 29°23′07″N 51°51′05″E
- Country: Iran
- Province: Fars
- County: Kazerun
- Bakhsh: Jereh and Baladeh
- Rural District: Jereh

Population (2006)
  - Total: 135
- Time zone: UTC+3:30 (IRST)
  - Summer (DST): UTC+4:30 (IRDT)

Robatak (Persian: رباطک, also Romanized as Robāţak and Rabātak) is a village in Jereh Rural District, Jereh and Baladeh District, Kazerun County, Fars province, Iran. At the 2006 census, its population was 135, in 28 families.
