= Rabatak inscription =

Inscription written on a rock found in Afghanistan

Rabatak Inscription
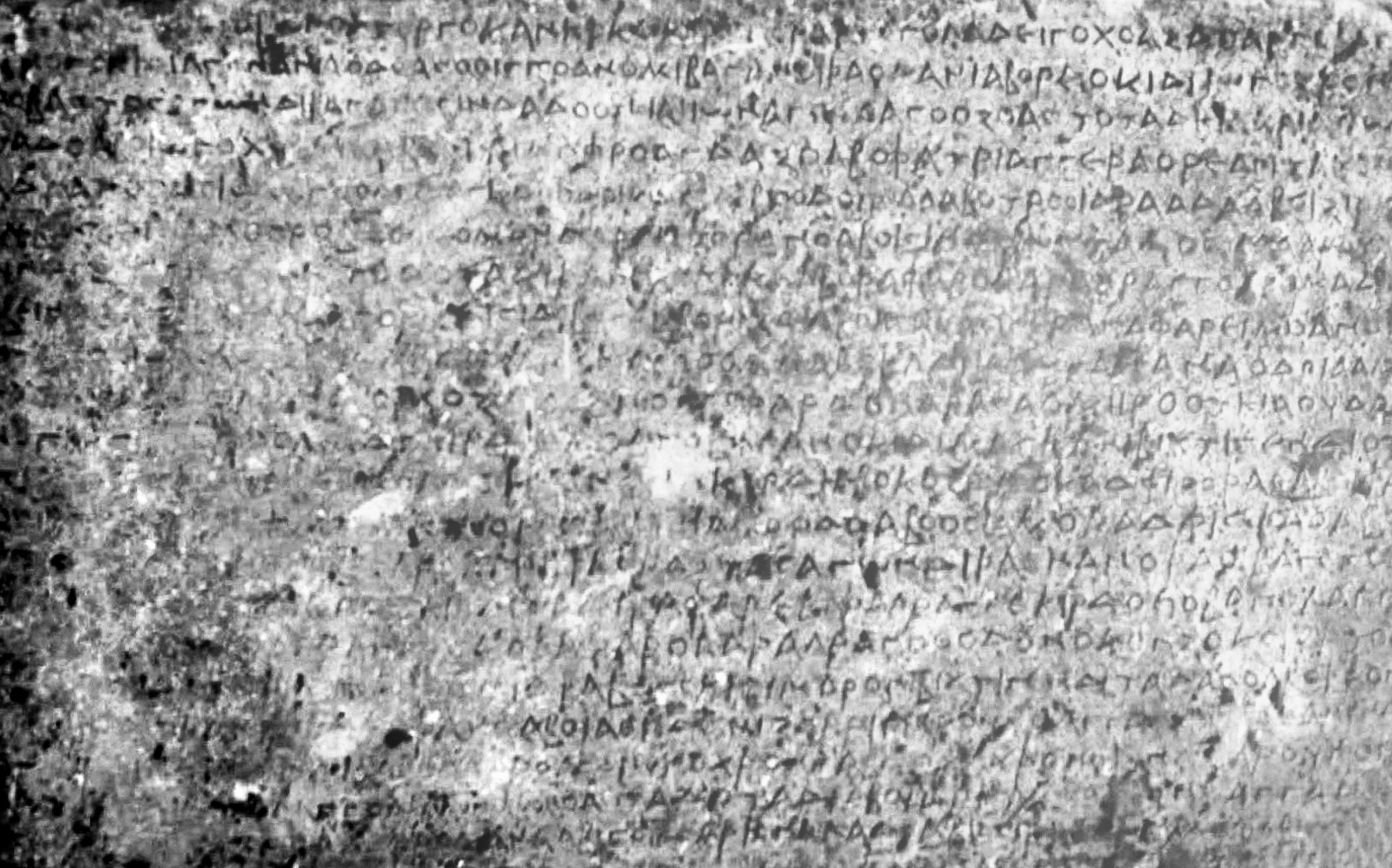
- The Rabatak Inscription
- Period/culture: 2nd century CE
- Discovered: 36.149434°N 68.404101°E
- Place: Rabatak, Baghlan Province, Afghanistan
- Present location: Kabul Museum, Kabul, Afghanistan

Location

The Rabatak Inscription is a stone inscribed with text written in the Bactrian language and Greek script, found in 1993 at Rabatak, near Surkh Kotal in Afghanistan. The inscription relates to the rule of the Kushan emperor Kanishka, and gives remarkable clues on the genealogy of the Kushan dynasty. It dates to the 2nd century CE.

== Discovery ==
The Rabatak inscription was found near the top of an artificial hill, a Kushan site, near the main Kabul-Mazar highway, to the southeast of the Rabatak pass which is currently the border between Baghlan and Samangan provinces. It was found by Afghan mujahideen digging a trench at the top of the site, along with several other stone sculptural elements such as the paws of a giant stone lion, which have since disappeared.

An English aid worker who belonged to the demining organization HALO Trust, witnessed and took a photograph of the inscription before reporting the discovery. The photograph was sent to the British Museum, where its significance as an official document that named four kings of Kushan, was recognised by Joe Cribb. He determined that it was similar to an inscription found in the 1950s at Surkh Kotal by the French Archaeological Delegation in Afghanistan. Cribb shared the photograph with one of only a handful of living people able to read the Bactrian language, Nicholas Sims-Williams of the School of Oriental and African Studies (SOAS). More photographs arrived from HALO Trust workers, and a first translation was published by Cribb and Sims-Williams in 1996.

[….]νο βωγο στοργο κανηþκε κοþανο ραþτογο λαδειγo χοαζαοαργο βαγ[η]-
[….]no bōgo storgo kanēške košan raštog lādeigo xoazaoargo bag[ē]-
. . . of the great salvation, Kanishka the Kushan, the righteous, the just, the autocrat, the god

ζνογο κιδι ασo νανα oδo ασo oισπoανo µι βαγανo ι þαoδανo αβoρδo κιδι ιωγo χþoνo
znogo kidi aso Nana odo aso oispoan mi bagano i šaodano abordo kidi iōg xšono
worthy of worship, who has obtained the kingship from Nana and from all the gods, who has inaugurated the year one

νoβαστo σ(α)γωνδι βαγανo σινδαδo oτηια ι ιωναγγo oασo oζoαστo ταδηια αριαo ωσ-
nobasto s(a)gōndi bagano sindado otēia i iōnaggo oaso ozoasto tadēia ariao ōs-
as the gods pleased. And he *issued a Greek *edict (and) then he put it into Aryan.

ταδo αβo ιωγo χþoν(o) αβo [ι] ιυνδo φρoαγδαζo αβo þατριαγγε þαoρε αγιτα κoo-
tado abo iōg xšon(o) abo [i] iundo froagdazo abo šatriagge šaore agita koo-
In the year one it has been proclaimed unto Sindh, unto the *whole of the realm of the *kshatriyas, that (as for)

αδηανo oδo ι oα(σ)πo oδ(o) [ι ζ]αγηδo oδo ι κωζ(αµ)βo oδo ι παλαβoτρo oιδρα αδα αβo ι ζιριτ-
adēano odo i oa(s)po od(o) [i z]agēdo odo i kōz(am)bo odo i palabotro oidra ada abo i zirit-
them – both the (city of) . . . and the (city of) Saketa, and the (city of) Kausambi, and the (city of) Pataliputra, as far as the (city of) Sri-Campa

αµβo σιδηιανo πρoβαo oδo µανδαρσι ζαopανo αβo ι σινδo ωσταδo oτη(ι)α αρoυγo
ambo sidēiano probao odo mandarsi zaorano abo i sindo ōstado otē(i)a arougo
– whatever rulers and other *important persons (they might have) he had submitted to (his) will, and he had submitted all

ιυνδo (αβo) ι σινδo ωσταδo ταδι þαι κανηþκε αβo þαφαρo καραλραγγo φρoµαδo
iundo (abo) i sindo ōstado tadi šai kanēške abo šafaro karalraggo fromado
Sindh to (his) will. Then King Kanishka gave orders to Shafar the Karalrang (Note: Karalrang means "Lord of the border land". See: Sundermann, Werner; Hintze, Almut; Blois, François de (2009). Exegisti Monumenta: Festschrift in Honour of Nicholas Sims-Williams. Otto Harrassowitz Verlag. p. 216. ISBN 978-3-447-05937-4.)

(α)βειναo βαγoλαγγo κιρδι σιδι β…αβo ριζδι αβo µα καδγε ραγα φαρειµoανo β-
(a)beinao bagolango kirdi sidi b…abo rizdi abo ma kadge raga fareimoano b-
*at this . . . to make the sanctuary which is called B . . . ab, in the *plain of Ka . . ., for these

(α)γα(ν)o κιδι µαρo κιρδαν(ε) ι µα..o[φ]αρρo oµµα ooηλδι ια αµσα νανα oδo ια αµ-
(a)ga(n)o kidi maro kirdan(e) i ma…o[f]arro omma ooēldi ia amsa nana odo ia am-
gods, (of) whom the . . . *glorious Umma leads the *service here, (namely:) the *lady Nana and the

σα oµµα αoρoµoζδo µoζδoo(α)νo σρoþαρδo ναρασαo µιιρo oτηια oυδoα-
sa omma aoromozdo mozdoo(a)no srošardo narasao miiro otēia oudoa-
lady Umma, Aurmuzd, the gracious one, Sroshard, Narasa, (and) Mihr. [interlinear text: . . . and he is called Maaseno, and he is called Bizago] And he likewise

νo πι(δo)γιρβo φρoµαδo κιρδι ειµoανo βαγανo κιδι µασκα νιβιχτιγενδι oτ-
no pi(do)girbo fromado kirdi eimoano bagano kidi maska nibixtigendi ot-
gave orders to make images of these gods who are written above, and

ηια φρoµαδo αβειµoανo þαoνανo κιρδι αβo κoζoυλo καδφισo þαo αβo ι φρ-
ēia fromado abeimoano šaonano kirdi abo kozoulo kadfiso šao abo i fr-
he gave orders to make (them) for these kings: for King Kujula Kadphises (his) great

oνιαγo (o)δo α(βo o)oηµo (τ)ακτoo þαo α(β)[o] ι νια(γ)o oδo αβo ooηµo καδφισo þαo αβo
oniago (o)do a(bo o)oēmo (t)akto šao a(b)[o] i nia(g)o odo abo ooēmo kadfiso šao abo
grandfather, and for King Vima Taktu, (his) grandfather, and for King Vima Kadphises

(ι) πιδα oδo αβo ι χoβιε αβo κανηþκo þαo tα σαγωνδι þαoνανo þαo ι βαγoπoo-
(i) pido odo abo i xobie abo kanēško šao ta sagōndi šaonano šao i bagopoo-
(his) father, and *also for himself, King Kanishka. Then, as the king of kings, the Devaputra (Note: "Devaputra" means "Son of the Gods" in Indian languages.)

ρακ[α]νε […] φρ(o)µαδo κιρδι ταδι þαφαρε καραλραγγε κιρδo ειo βαγoλαγγo
rak[a]ne […] fr(o)mado kirdi tadi šafare karalraggo kirdo eio bagolaggo
. . . had given orders to do, Shafar the Karalrang made this sanctuary.

{[ ]o} καραλραγγo oδo þαφαρo καραλραγγo oδo νoκoνζoκo ι αþτoo-
{} karalraggo odo šafaro karalraggo odo nokonzoko i aštoo-
[Then . . .] the Karalrang, and Shafar the Karalrang, and Nukunzuk [led] the worship

α[λγo κιρ]δo ια φρoµανo ειµιδβα βαγε κιδι µαρo νιβιχτιγενδι ταδανo αβo þαoν-
a[lgo kir]do ia fromano eimidba bage kidi maro nibixtigendi tadano abo šaon-
[according to] the (king's) command. (As for) *these gods who are written here – may they [keep] the

αν(o) þαo αβo κανηþκε κoþανo αβo ιαoηδανι ζoρριγι λρoυ(γ)o αγγαδ…γo oανινδ-
an(o) šao abo kanēške košano abo iaoēdani zorrigi lrou(g)o aggad…go oanind-
king of kings, Kanishka the Kushan, for ever healthy, *secure, (and) victorious.

o π[…]ι(ν)δι oδ[…](δ)ι βα(γ)επooρo ασo ιωγo χþoνo αβo ιo (α) χþoνo ιυνδo αρoυγo ν-
o p[…]i(n)di od[..](d)i ba(g)epooro aso iōgo xšono abo io (a) xšono iundo arougo n-
And [when] the devaputra, the *ruler from the year one to the year *one *thousand,

αρα[ ]ι β(α)γoλαγγo αβo ιωγo χþoνo ασπαδo ταδι αβo ι αρηµεσo χþoνo αγγαρ[…]
ara[ ]i b(a)golaggo abo iōgo xšono aspado tadi abo i arēmeso xšono aggar[…]
had *founded the sanctuary in the year one, then *also to the . . . year. . .

[]χα[ π]ιδo þαo φρoµανα αβισσι παρηνα λαδo αβισσι ρηδγε λαδo αβισσ[ι..]
[]xa[ p]ido šao fromana abissi parēna lado abissi rēdge lado abiss[i..]
according to the king's command . . . (and) it was given also to the . . ., (and) it was given also to the . . ., (and) also to

[ ]þαι µαδ...α (α)βo βαγανo λαδo oδo φαρειµoανo αχoδανo [σι]δι [α]βo µι βαγε λ[αδo]
[ ]šai mad…a (a)bo bagano lado ado fareimoano axodano [si]di abo mi bage l[ado]
. . . the king gave an *endowment to the gods, and . . .

[ ]ατιδ(η)oσ[
[ ]atid(ē)os

Because of the civil war in Afghanistan years passed before further examination was possible. In April 2000 Jonathan Lee, an English specialist in Afghan history, travelled with Robert Kluijver, director of the Society for the Preservation of Afghanistan's Cultural Heritage, from Mazar-i Sharif to Pul-i Khumri, the provincial capital of Baghlan, to locate the stone. It was eventually found in a storehouse at the Department of Mines and Industry. Lee took photographs that allowed Sims-Williams to publish a more accurate translation, and another translation once Sims-Williams had examined the stone in person (2008).

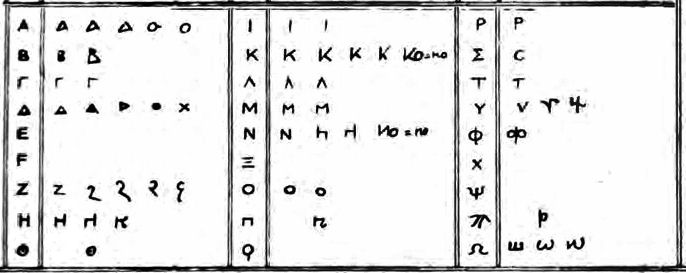
Variations of the Greek alphabet (narrow columns) in the Kushan script (wide columns)

In July 2000 Robert Kluijver travelled with a delegation of the Kabul Museum to Pul-i Khumri to retrieve the stone inscription (weighing between 500 and 600 kilograms [1,100 and 1,300 lb]). It was brought by car to Mazar-i Sharif and flown from there to Kabul. At the time the Taliban had a favorable policy towards the preservation of Afghan cultural heritage, including pre-Islamic heritage. The inscription, whose historical value had meanwhile been determined by Sims-Williams, became the centrepiece of the exhibition of the (few) remaining artifacts in the Kabul Museum, leading to a short-lived inauguration of the museum on 17 August 2000. Senior Taliban officials objected to the display of pre-Islamic heritage, which led to the closing of the museum (and the transfer of the Rabatak inscription to safety), a reversal of the cultural heritage policy and eventually leading to the destruction of the Buddhas of Bamyan and other pre-Islamic statuary (from February 2001 onwards).

Today the Rabatak inscription is again on display in the reopened Afghan National Museum, or Kabul Museum.

The Rabatak site, again visited by Robert Kluijver in March 2002, has been looted and destroyed (the looting was performed with bulldozers), reportedly by the local commander at Rabatak.

== Main findings ==
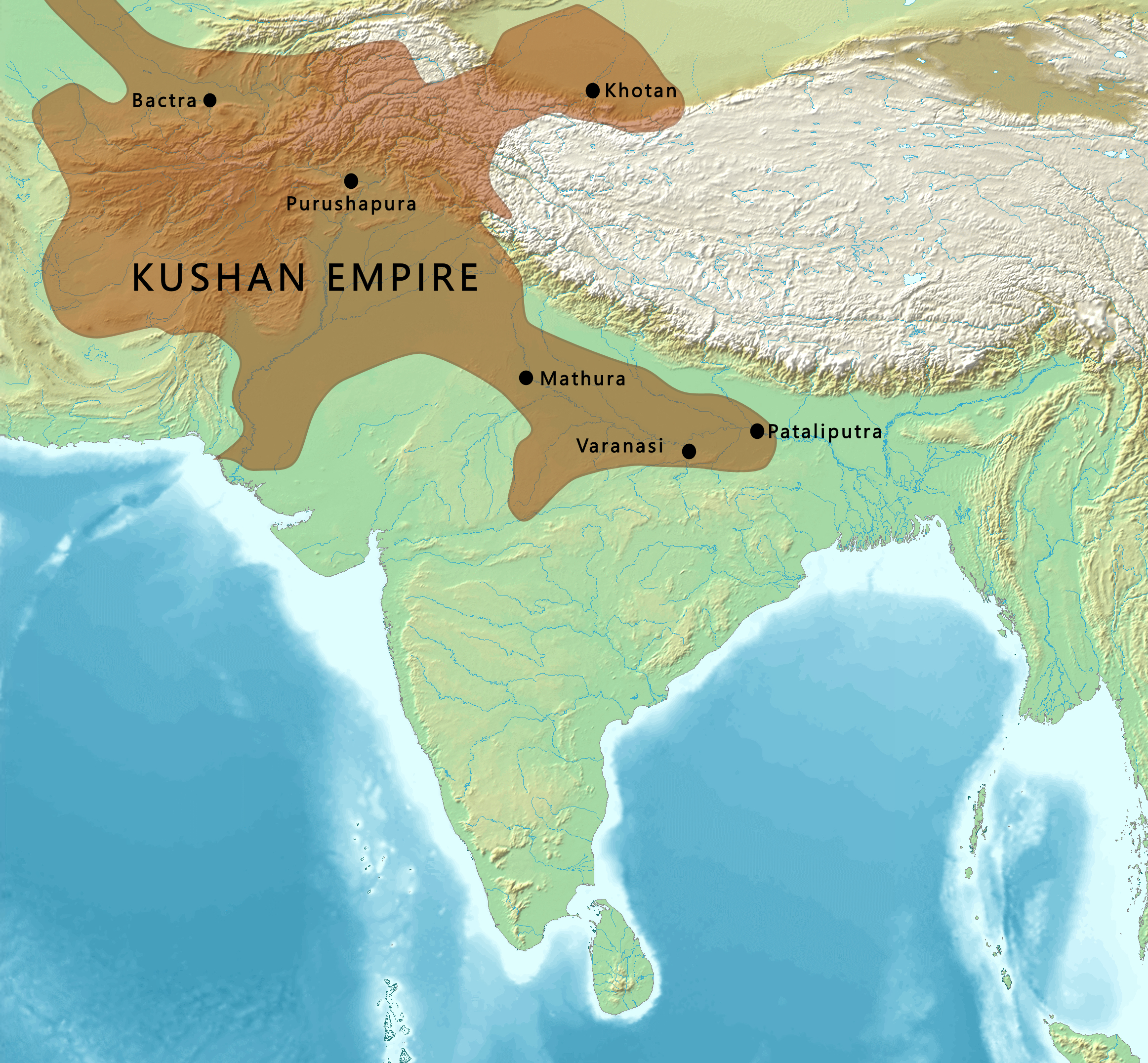
Territories of the Kushans under Kaniska according to the Rabatak inscription (for the Indian part of Kanishka's territory).

=== Religion ===
The first lines of the inscription describe Kanishka as:

"the great salvation, the righteous, just autocrat, worthy of divine worship, who has obtained the kingship from Nana and from all the gods, who has inaugurated the year one as the gods pleased" (Trans. Sims-Williams)

=== The "Arya language" ===
Follows a statement regarding the writing of the inscription itself, indicating that the language used by Kanishka in his inscription was self-described as the "Aryan language".

"It was he who laid out (i.e. discontinued the use of) the Ionian ("ιωνα", Yona, Greek) speech and then placed the Arya ("αρια", Aryan) speech."

=== Regnal eras ===
Also, Kanishka announces the beginning of a new era starting with the year 1 of his reign, abandoning the therefore "Great Arya Era" which had been in use, possibly meaning the Vikrama era of 58 BCE.

=== Territorial extent ===
Lines 4 to 7 describe the cities which were under the rule of Kanishka, among which four names are identifiable: Saketa, Kausambi, Pataliputra, and Champa (although the text is not clear whether Champa was a possession of Kanishka or just beyond it). The Rabatak inscription is significant in suggesting the actual extent of Kushan rule under Kanishka, which would go significantly beyond traditionally held boundaries:

=== Succession ===
Finally, Kanishka makes the list of the kings who ruled up to his time: Kujula Kadphises as his great-grandfather, Vima Taktu as his grandfather, Vima Kadphises as his father, and himself Kanishka:

"for King Kujula Kadphises (his) great grandfather, and for King Vima Taktu (his) grandfather, and for King Vima Kadphises (his) father, and *also for himself, King Kanishka" (Cribb and Sims-Williams 1995/6: 80)

== Mukherjee translation ==
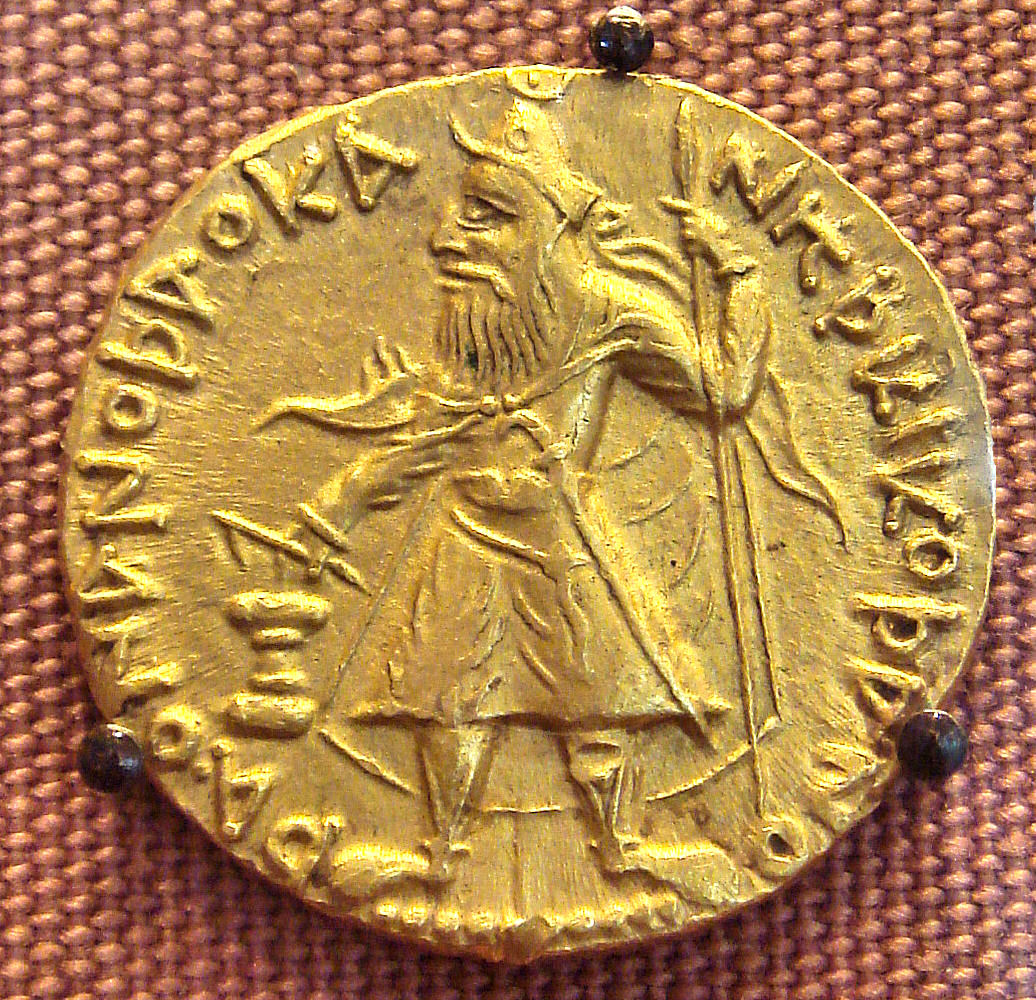
Kanishka ordered the carving of the Rabatak inscription.

B. N. Mukherjee also published a translation of the inscription.

1–3
"The year one of Kanishka, the great deliverer, the righteous, the just, the autocrat, the god, worthy of worship, who has obtained the kingship from Nana and from all the gods, who has laid down (i.e. established) the year one as the gods pleased."
3–4
"And it was he who laid out (i.e. discontinued the use of) the Ionian speech and then placed the Arya (or Aryan) speech (i.e. replaced the use of Greek by the Aryan or Bactrian language)."
4–6
"In the year one, it has been proclaimed unto Sindh, unto the whole realm of the governing class including Koonadeano (Kaundinya< Kundina) and the city of Ozeno (Ozene, Ujjain) and the city of Zageda (Saketa) and the city of Kozambo (Kausambi) and the city of Palabotro (Pataliputra) and so long unto (i.e. as far as) the city of Ziri-tambo (Sri-Champa)."
6–7
"Whichever rulers and the great householders there might have been, they submitted to the will of the king and all India submitted to the will of the king."
7–9
"The king Kanishka commanded Shapara (Shaphar), the master of the city, to make the Nana Sanctuary, which is called (i.e. known for having the availability of) external water (or water on the exterior or surface of the ground), in the plain of Kaeypa, for these deities – of whom are Ziri (Sri) Pharo (Farrah) and Omma."
9-9A
"To lead are the Lady Nana and the Lady Omma, Ahura Mazda, Mazdooana, Srosharda, who is called ... and Komaro (Kumara) and called Maaseno (Mahasena) and called Bizago (Visakha), Narasao and Miro (Mihara)."
10–11
"And he gave same (or likewise) order to make images of these deities who have been written above."
11–14
"And he ordered to make images and likenesses of these kings: for king Kujula Kadphises, for the great grandfather, and for this grandfather Saddashkana (Sadashkana), the Soma sacrificer, and for king V'ima Kadphises, for the father, and for himself (?), king Kanishka."
14–15
"Then, as the king of kings, the son of god, had commanded to do, Shaphara, the master of the city, made this sanctuary."
16–17
"Then, the master of the city, Shapara, and Nokonzoka led worship according to the royal command."
17–20
"These gods who are written here, then may ensure for the king of kings, Kanishka, the Kushana, for remaining for eternal time healthy., secure and victorious... and further ensure for the son of god also having authority over the whole of India from the year one to the year thousand and thousand."
20
"Until the sanctuary was founded in the year one, to (i.e. till) then the Great Arya year had been the fashion."
21
"...According to the royal command, Abimo, who is dear to the emperor, gave capital to Pophisho."
22
"...The great king gave (i.e. offered worship) to the deities."
23
"..."

Note: This translation differs from Nicholas Sims-Williams, who has "Vima Taktu" as the grandfather of Kanishka (lines 11–14). Further, Sims-Williams does not read the words "Saddashkana" or "Soma" anywhere in the inscription.

== See also ==
- Religion in Afghanistan
- Hinduism in Afghanistan
- Buddhism in Afghanistan
- Hindu and Buddhist heritage of Afghanistan

== Sources ==
- Sims-Williams, Nicholas and Cribb, Joe 1996, "A New Bactrian Inscription of Kanishka the Great", Silk Road Art and Archaeology, volume 4, 1995–6, Kamakura, pp. 75–142.
- Fussman, Gérard (1998). "L’inscription de Rabatak et l’origine de l’ère saka." Journal asiatique 286.2 (1998), pp. 571–651.
- Pierre Leriche, Chakir Pidaev, Mathilde Gelin, Kazim Abdoulaev, " La Bactriane au carrefour des routes et des civilisations de l'Asie centrale : Termez et les villes de Bactriane-Tokharestan ", Maisonneuve et Larose – IFÉAC, Paris, 2001 ISBN 2-7068-1568-X . Actes du colloque de Termez 1997. (Several authors, including Gérard Fussman « L'inscription de Rabatak. La Bactriane et les Kouchans » )
- S.R. Goyal "Ancient Indian Inscriptions" Kusumanjali Book World, Jodhpur (India), 2005.
- Sims-Williams, Nicholas (1998): "Further notes on the Bactrian inscription of Rabatak, with an Appendix on the names of Kujula Kadphises and Vima Taktu in Chinese." Proceedings of the Third European Conference of Iranian Studies Part 1: Old and Middle Iranian Studies. Edited by Nicholas Sims-Williams. Wiesbaden. 1998, pp. 79–93.
- Sims-Williams, Nicholas (2004). "The Bactrian Inscription of Rabatak: A New Reading." Bulletin of the Asia Institute 18, 2004, pp. 53–68.
