= Robatak, Afghanistan =

Robatak
- Location in Afghanistan
- Coordinates: 36°8′48″N 68°24′7″E
- Country: Afghanistan
- Province: Baghlan Province
- Time zone: + 4.30

Robatak or Rabatak (Persian/Pashto: رباطک) is a village in Baghlan Province in northeastern Afghanistan.

== See also ==
- Baghlan Province
- Rabatak inscription
