= Kushan =

Kushan or Kushana may refer to:

- Kushan, an ancient people of Central Asia of Yuezhi origin
- Kushan Empire (1st–4th centuries CE), an empire formed by the Yuezhi in Central Asia and the northern Indian subcontinent
  - Kushan art, the art of the Kushan Empire
  - Kushan coinage, the coinage of the Kushan Empire
  - Kushan script, a partially deciphered writing system, used to record a language related to Bactrian
  - Kushana Brahmi, an Indic script, a variant of Brahmi
- Kushano-Sasanian Kingdom or the Indo-Sassanian Kingdom (230–365 CE), kingdom in Bactria and the northern Indian subcontinent, part of the Sasanian Empire
  - Kushanshahr, a province of the Sasanian Empire covering the area of the Kushano-Sasanian Kingdom
  - Kushan Shah, a title of Kushano-Sassanian kings
- Kushan dance, an Indian folk dance based on the Ramayana epic
- Kushan Nandy, an Indian filmmaker
- Kushana Bush, a New Zealand artist
- Kushanabha, a Hindu mythological king
- Kushan Pass, a Hindu Kush mountain pass in Afghanistan
- Kushan-e Pain, a village in Sistan and Baluchistan, Iran

== Entertainment ==
- Kushan, a large empire from the Berserk series

== See also ==
- Kusha (disambiguation)
- Kashan (disambiguation)
- Kushaniya, a medieval town near Samarkand
