= Kashan (disambiguation) =

Kashan is a city in Isfahan Province, Iran.

Kashan may also refer to:

- Qashan, a historical city in Volga Bulgaria and Khanate of Kazan
- Kashan, alternate name of Jaleq, a city in Sistan and Baluchestan Province, Iran
- Kashan, Alborz, a village in Alborz Province, Iran
- Kashan, East Azerbaijan, a village in East Azerbaijan Province, Iran
- Kashan, Hormozgan, a village in Hormozgan Province, Iran
- Kashan, Khuzestan, a village in Khuzestan Province, Iran
- Kashan County, an administrative subdivision of Isfahan Province, Iran
- Kashan (Peru), a mountain in Peru
- Magaliesberg, a mountain range in South Africa, formerly known as the Kashan or Cashan mountains

== See also ==
- Kashani, a surname
