= Kusan =

Kusan may refer to:

- Kusan, Iran, a village in the Razavi Khorasan Province
- Kusan languages, a native American language family in today's Oregon
- Kušan, a Croatian surname, includes a list of people with the name

== See also ==
- Kusans
- Kunsan
- Kushan (disambiguation)
