= Sadashkana =

Son of Kushan emperor

Sadashkana (Kharosthi: 𐨮𐨿𐨐𐨞𐨆𐨯𐨡 Sa-da-ṣka-ṇa, Sadaṣkaṇa) was the son of Kushan emperor Kujula Kadphises, according to the gold plate inscription of Oḍirāja Senavarman, in the first century CE.

== Biography ==
The gold plate inscription of Oḍirāja Senavarman, dated to 39 CE states him to the son of Kujula Kataphsa, and further calls him Devaputra (son of god):

Gandhārī transliteration:

Maharaja rayatiraya Kuyula Kataphsaputra Sadashkano devaputra"

Translation:

"The son of god Sadashkano, son of the Great king and king of kings, Kujula Kaphises"

The Chinese Book of Later Han 後漢書 chronicles gives an account of the formation of the Kushan Empire based on a report made by the Chinese general Ban Yong to the Chinese Emperor c. 125 AD:

More than a hundred years later [than the conquest of Bactria by the Da Yuezhi], the prince [xihou] of Guishuang (Badakhshan) established himself as king, and his dynasty was called that of the Guishuang (Kushan) King. He invaded Anxi (Indo-Parthia), and took the Gaofu (Kabul) region. He also defeated the whole of the kingdoms of Puda (Paktiya) and Jibin (Kapisha and Gandhara). Qiujiuque (Kujula Kadphises) was more than eighty years old when he died. His son, Yangaozhen [probably Vema Tahk (tu) or, possibly, his brother Sadaṣkaṇa ], became king in his place. He defeated Tianzhu [North-western India] and installed Generals to supervise and lead it. The Yuezhi then became extremely rich. All the kingdoms call [their king] the Guishuang [Kushan] king, but the Han call them by their original name, Da Yuezhi.

— Book of Later Han.

== See also ==
- Indo-Greek kingdom
