= Odirajas =

Gandhāran Buddhist dynasty, 1st century CE

The Oḍirājas (Gandhārī: oḍiraya) were a local Gandhāran Buddhist dynasty of Swat Valley attested in several reliquary inscriptions dating from the first century CE. Their capital was probably located at modern Oḍigram.

Oḍirājas are chiefly known from their three inscriptions, dated to the rule of Ajidaseṇa (year 4), Varmaseṇa (year 5) and Seṇavarma (year 14), respectively. The later two were brothers, and sons of Ajidaseṇa. Stefan Baums dates the inscriptions of the three rulers to 9, 30 and 39 CE, respectively. They were closely related to the neighbouring Buddhist dynasty of Apracharajas and possibly had matrimonial alliances with them.

The Oḍirājas claimed ancestry from Ikṣvāku lineage of Buddha's Śākya clan, through one Utaraseṇa who was said by Xuanzang to have descended from Śākyan exiles to Oḍḍiyāna.

== Inscriptions ==
The latest, and longest, Oḍi inscription is that of Seṇavarma's gold leaf inscription, which details his genealogy and his establishment of Buddhist relics. The inscription mentions that the stupa of Ekaüḍa had been originally established by "Vasuseṇa, son of Utaraseṇa, king of Oḍi from the Ikṣvāku family", and as it had been destroyed after being stuck by lightning, Seṇavarma, son of Ajidaseṇa, being heir of Utaraseṇa, rebuilt it. The inscription then honours parents of Seṇavarma, members of his court, his deceased brother Varmaseṇa, his ancestors, and the Kushan suzerain Kujula Kadphises and his son Sadaṣkaṇa. It also mentions the names of the officials who wrote and placed the inscription:

Mother and father, who undertake a difficult practice – Uzaṃda, who has a living son and who is still alive, and (my) father who passed on, Ajidaseṇa, king of Oḍi – are honored. Sadaṣkaṇa, son of the Great King, King of Kings, Kujula Kadphises, the Devaputra, together with the anankaios Suhasoma, the aṣmaṇakara, with his yoke animals and with his army and carriages, together with the guśurakas and the sturakas, is honored. The brother who passed on, Varmaseṇa, King of Oḍi, and the princes Ajidavarma and Ayaseṇa, who are still alive, are honored. Beginning with King Bhadaseṇa and up to my great-grandfather Diśaseṇa, all kings of Oḍi, born in the royal family of Ikṣvāku, are honored.

— Gold Scroll of Seṇavarma, Translated by Stefan Baums, 2012
