= Dam Ab-e Kashan =

Dam Ab-e Kashan دم اب كاشان
- Village
- Location within Iran
- Coordinates: 32°03′28″N 49°45′16″E
- Country: Iran
- Province: Khuzestan
- County: Izeh
- Bakhsh: Central
- Rural District: Pian

Population (2006)
  - Total: 79
- Time zone: UTC+3:30 (IRST)
  - Summer (DST): UTC+4:30 (IRDT)

Dam Ab-e Kashan (Persian: دم اب كاشان, also Romanized as Dam Āb-e Kāshān; also known as Kāshān) is a village in Pian Rural District, in the Central District of Izeh County, Khuzestan Province, Iran. At the 2006 census, its population was 79, in 13 families.
