= Kushan dance =

Bengali folk dance

Kushan dance or kushan nritya or kushan gaan is a Rajbongshi folk drama form based on Krittivasi Ramayan. The artistes narrate the story of Ramayan in Kamtapuri or Rajbongshi language through musical verses. The Kushan folk theater is traceable to the 15th century when the Koch dynasty ruled Assam, West Bengal, and the current northern Bangladesh. The name, Kushan, has its sources in the name Kush, the second son of Sita.

The men, called as sokra or chokra, sing and dance during the performance. The primary performer is known as mool or geedal - he narrates the story and the doari, the jester, works as an intermediary between the mool and the audience through commentaries, observations, and jokes. Bena, an instrument made of bamboo is used in the performances apart from aar banshi (bamboo flute), mondira, sarinja, akhrai, violin, and harmonium. The performance starts with ashar bandana, an auspicious song to seek the blessings of gods and goddesses.
