= Vima Kadphises =

2nd-century Kushan emperor

- King of Kings
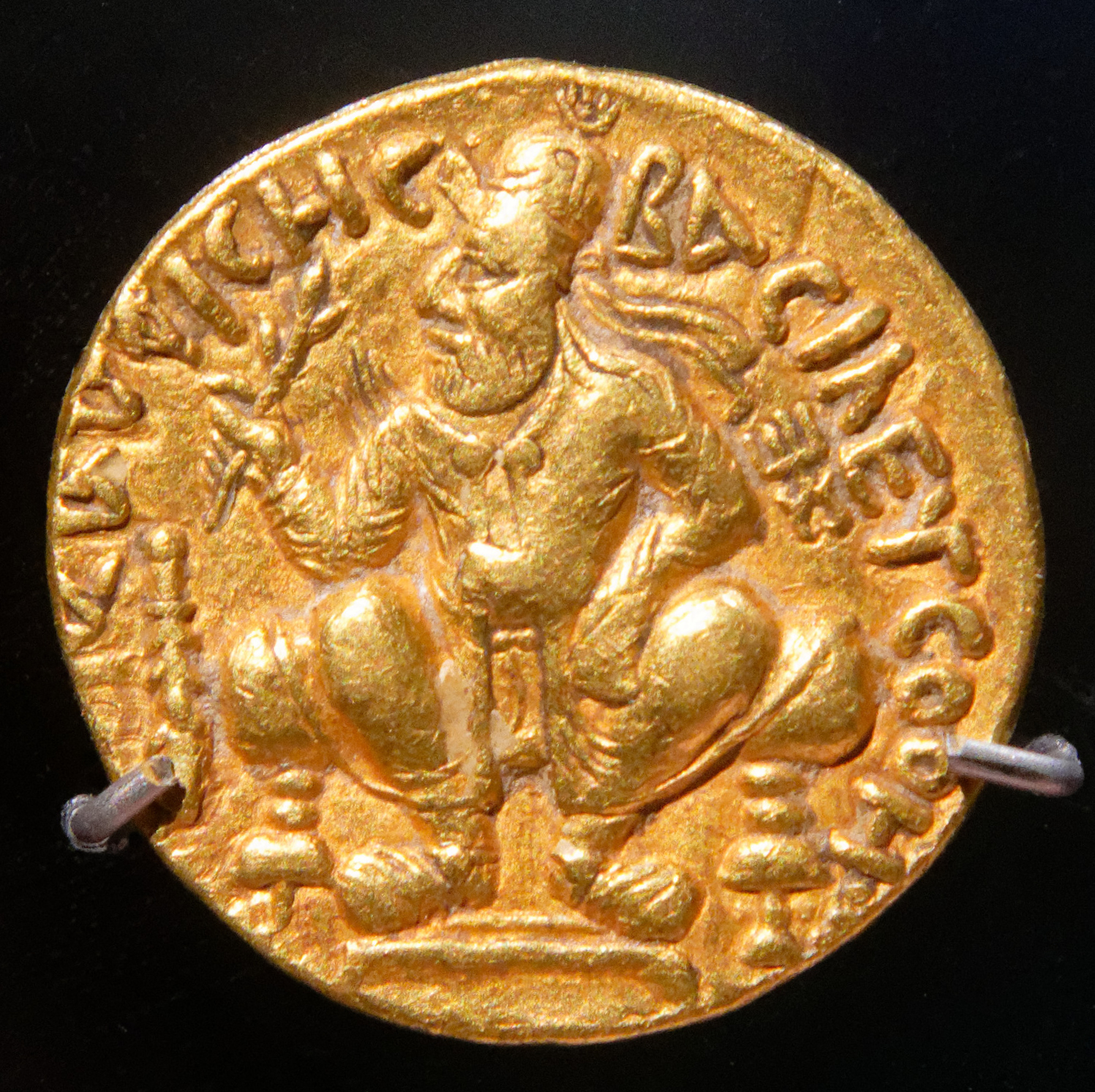
- Double stater of Vima Kadphises. Obverse: diademed and crowned figure of Vima Kadphises seated facing on stool with ornate legs, head left, feet on footstool, holding laurel branch in raised right hand. Corrupted Greek language legend: ΒΑΣΙΛΕΥΣ ΟΟΗΜΟ ΚΑΔΦΙϹΗϹ ("Basileus Ooimo Kadphisis"): "King Vima Kadphises". Afghanistan. Guimet Museum, MG24356

Kushan emperor
- Reign: 113–127 CE
- Predecessor: Vima Takto
- Successor: Kanishka
- Dynasty: Kushan
- Religion: Shaivism

Statue of Vima Kadphises
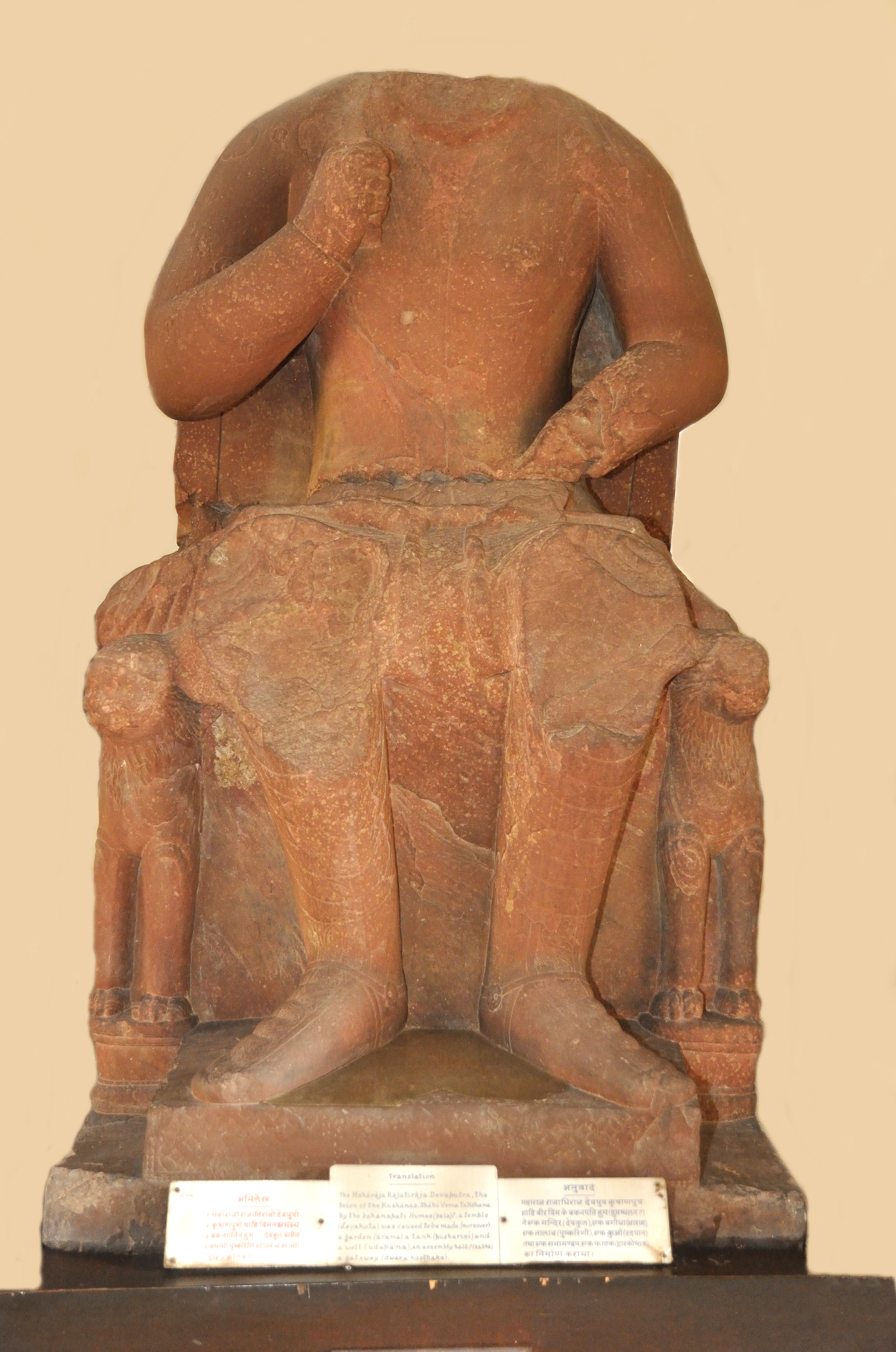
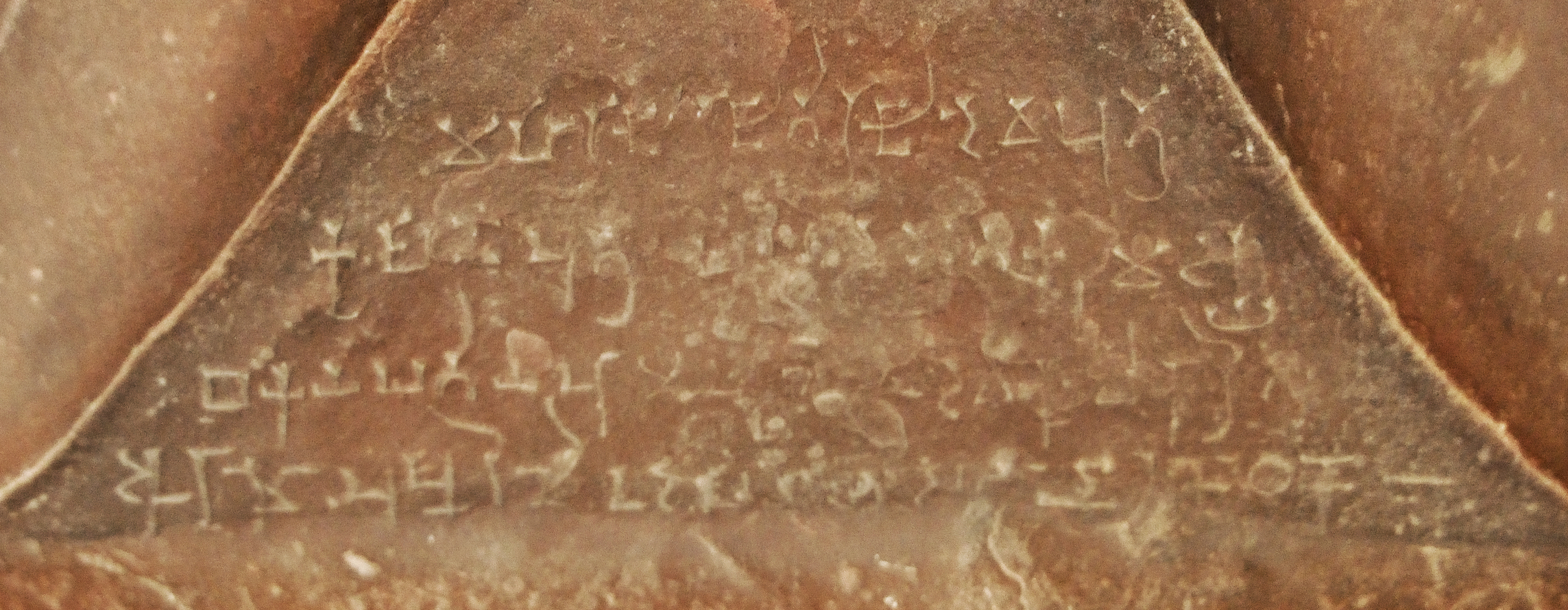
Vima Kadphises (or possibly Vima Takto) on throne. The name of the ruler is mentioned in an epigraphic inscription at the feet of the statue. The inscription reads:
Maharaja rajatiraja devaputra

Kushanaputra (Shahi Vamataksha) masya
Vakanapatina Huma (devakulu) karita

Arama pushkarini udapana (cha) sa-da (kothako)
Mathura Museum.

Vima Kadphises (Greek: Οοημο Καδφιϲηϲ Ooēmo Kadphisēs (epigraphic); Kharosthi: 𐨬𐨁𐨨 𐨐𐨫𐨿𐨤𐨁𐨭 Vi-ma Ka-lpi-śa, Vima Kalpiśa) was a Kushan emperor from approximately 113 to 127 CE. According to the Rabatak inscription, he was the son of Vima Takto and the father of Kanishka.

== Rule ==
The connection of Vima Kadphises with other Kushan rulers is described in the Rabatak inscription, which Kanishka wrote. Kanishka makes the list of the kings who ruled up to his time: Kujula Kadphises as his great-grandfather, Vima Taktu as his grandfather, Vima Kadphises as his father, and himself Kanishka:

...for King Kujula Kadphises (his) great grandfather, and for King Vima Taktu (his) grandfather, and for King Vima Kadphises (his) father, and *also for himself, King Kanishka

— Cribb & Sims-Williams (1996): 80

Emperor Vima Kadphises expanded the Kushan territory in Afghanistan and north-west India, where he may have replaced the Indo-Scythian ruler Sodasa in Mathura. The Kushans were able to maintain and protect the Silk Road, allowing silk, spices, textiles or medicine to move between China, India and the West. In particular, sea trade occurred with the Roman Empire, creating a return flow of gold coins, Greek wine and slaves. Works of arts were also imported as indicated by the artefacts found in the so-called Treasure of Begram. An artistic syncretism was observed in the empire, as indicated by the Greco-Buddhist art of Gandhara.

Roman historians relates the visit of ambassadors from the kings of Bactria and India to the court of Trajan (98–117 CE), bearing presents and letters in Greek, which may have been sent either by Vima Kadphises or his son Kanishka.

== Coinage ==
He was the Kushan emperor to first introduce gold coinage, in addition to the existing copper and silver coinage. Most of the gold seems to have been obtained through trade with the Roman Empire. The gold weight standard of approximately eight grams corresponds to that of Roman coins of the 1st century, into three denominations: the double stater, the stater, and the quarter starter (or dinara).

The usage of gold testifies to the prosperity of the Kushan Empire from the time of Vima, being the center of trade between the Han dynasty of China (where Vima was known as 阎膏珍), Central Asia and Alexandria and Antioch in the West.

Most of Vima's coins feature the Buddhist symbol of the Triratana on the reverse (or possibly Shiva's symbol for Nandi, the Nandipada), together with Hindu representations of Shiva, with or without his bull. Often time, a Trishul is depicted along with Shiva.

Major coin legends of Vima Kadphises

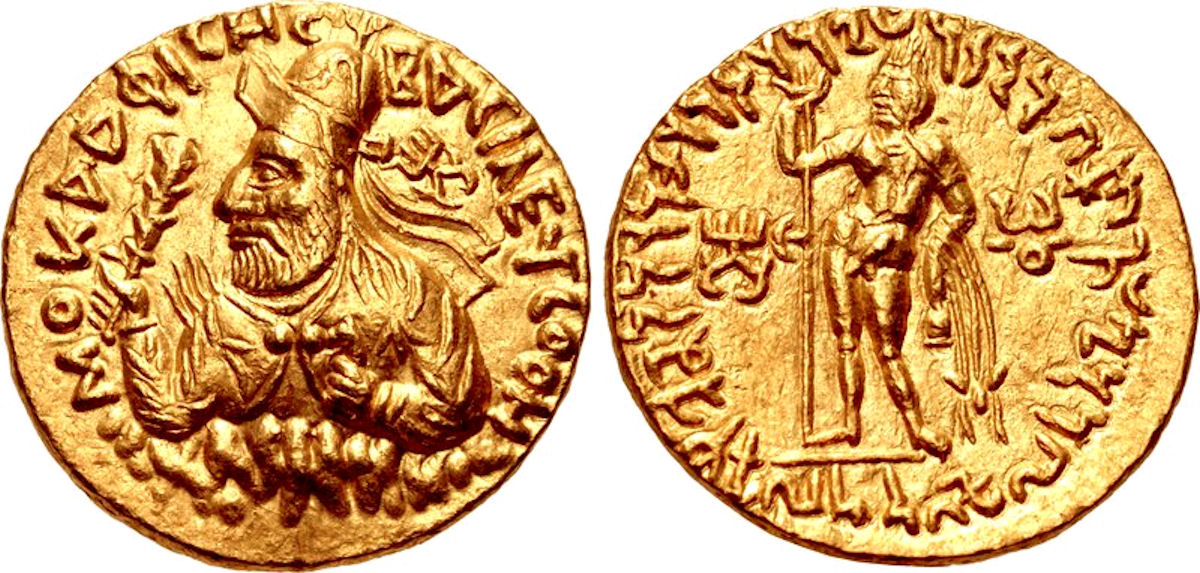
Vima Kadphises with Shiva.
Obv: Bust of king emerging from a cloud, with a crested helmet and holding a club. Corrupted Greek language legend: ΒΑΣΙΛΕΥΣ ΟΟΗΜΟ ΚΑΔΦΙΣΗΣ ("Basileus Ooimo Kadphisis"): "King Vima Kadphises".
Rev: Shiva, with a long trident in right hand, and the skin of a tiger in the left. Left, monogram of Vima Kadphises. Right: Buddhist triratna symbol (or possibly Nandipada). Kharoshthi legend: MAHARAJASA RAJADIRAJASA SARVALOGA ISVARASA MAHISVARASA VIMA KATHPHISASA TRADARA "The Great king, the king of kings, lord of the World, the Mahisvara (lord of the earth), Vima Kathphisa, the defender."

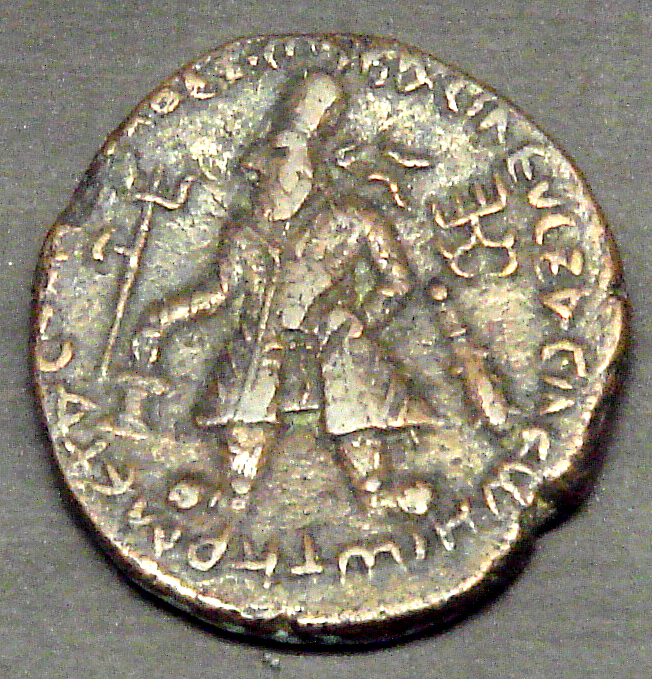
Vima Kadphises in long coat. Legend in corrupted Greek script: ΒΑϹΙΛΕΥϹ BACIΛEWN CWTHP MEΓAC ΟΟΗΜΟ ΚΑΔΦΙϹΗϹ ("Basileus Basileuon Soter Megas Ooemo Kadphises"): "King of Kings Vima Kadphises the Great Saviour". British Museum.

== Coin types ==
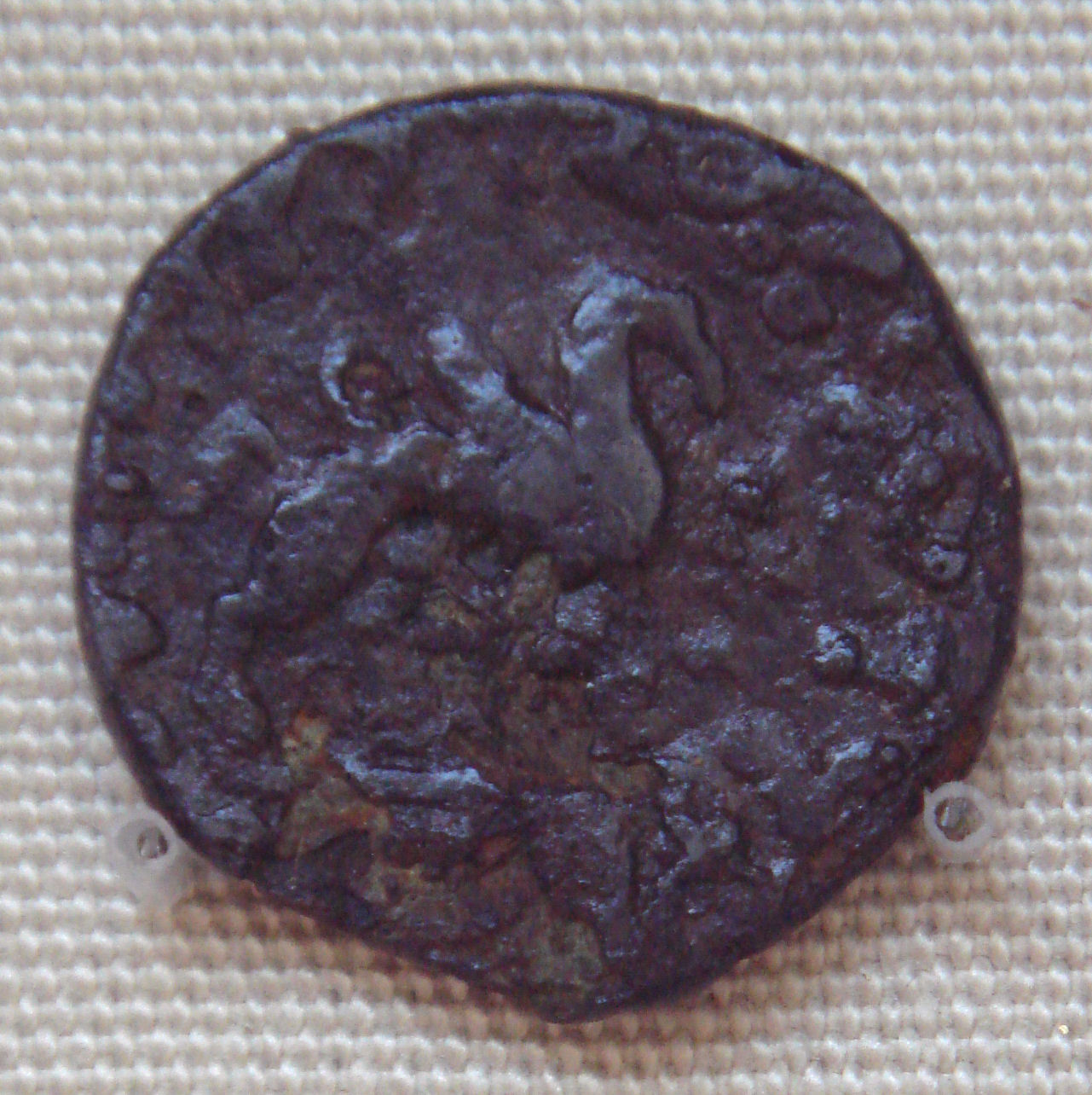
Bronze coin of Vima Kadphises with camel, found in Khotan

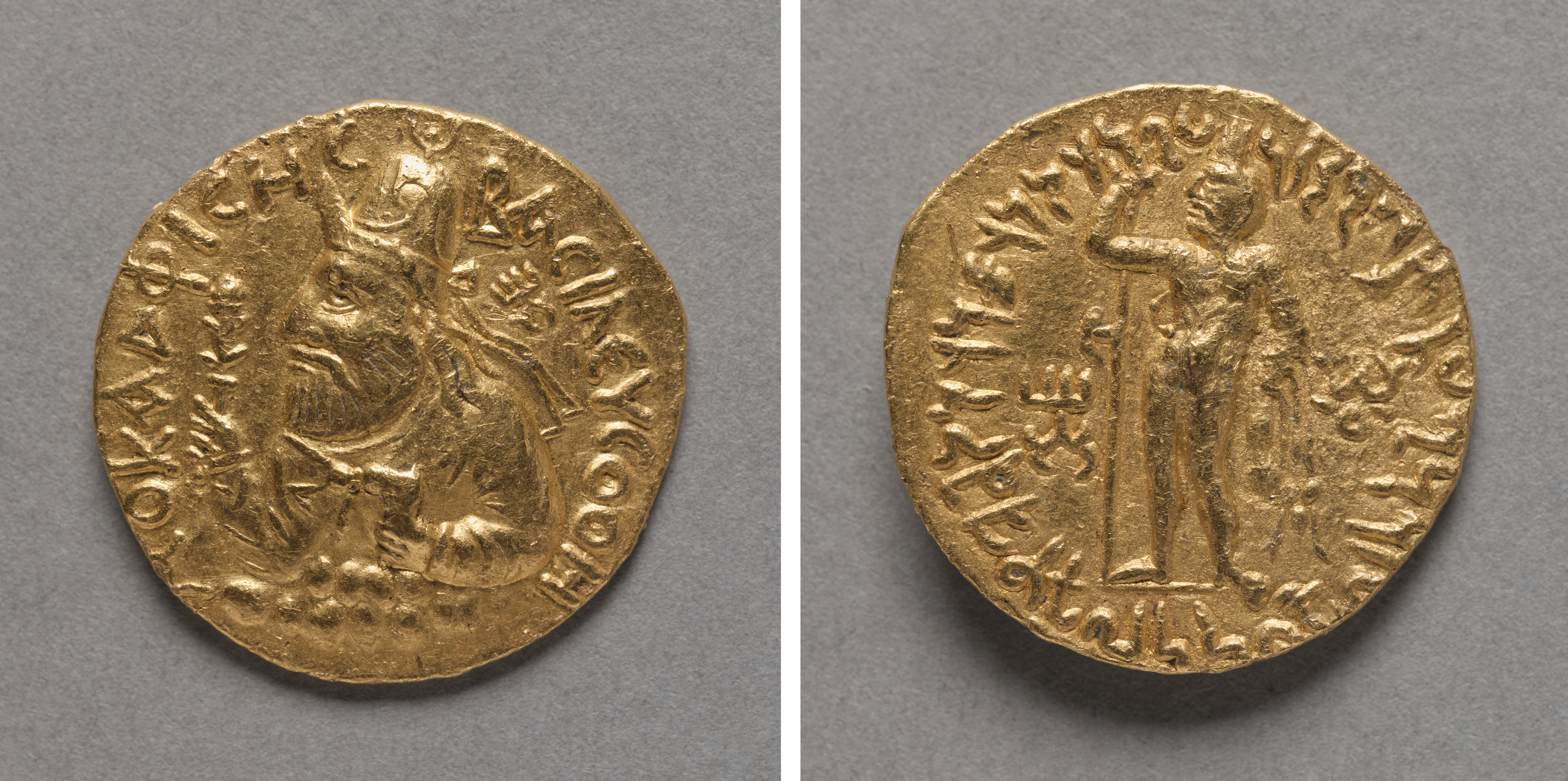
Coin of the Kushan empire, king Vima Kadphises, Cleveland Museum of Art

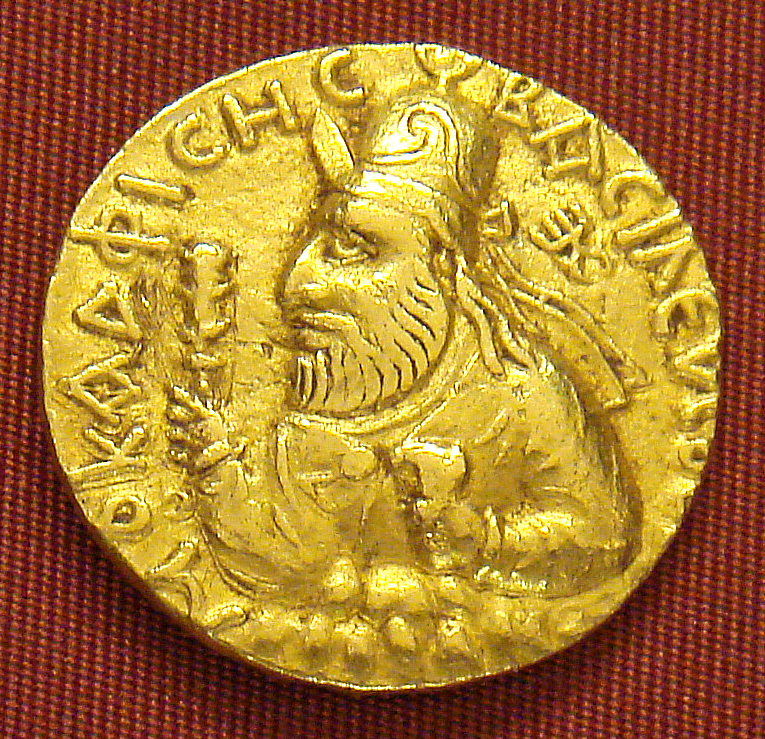
Coin of Vima

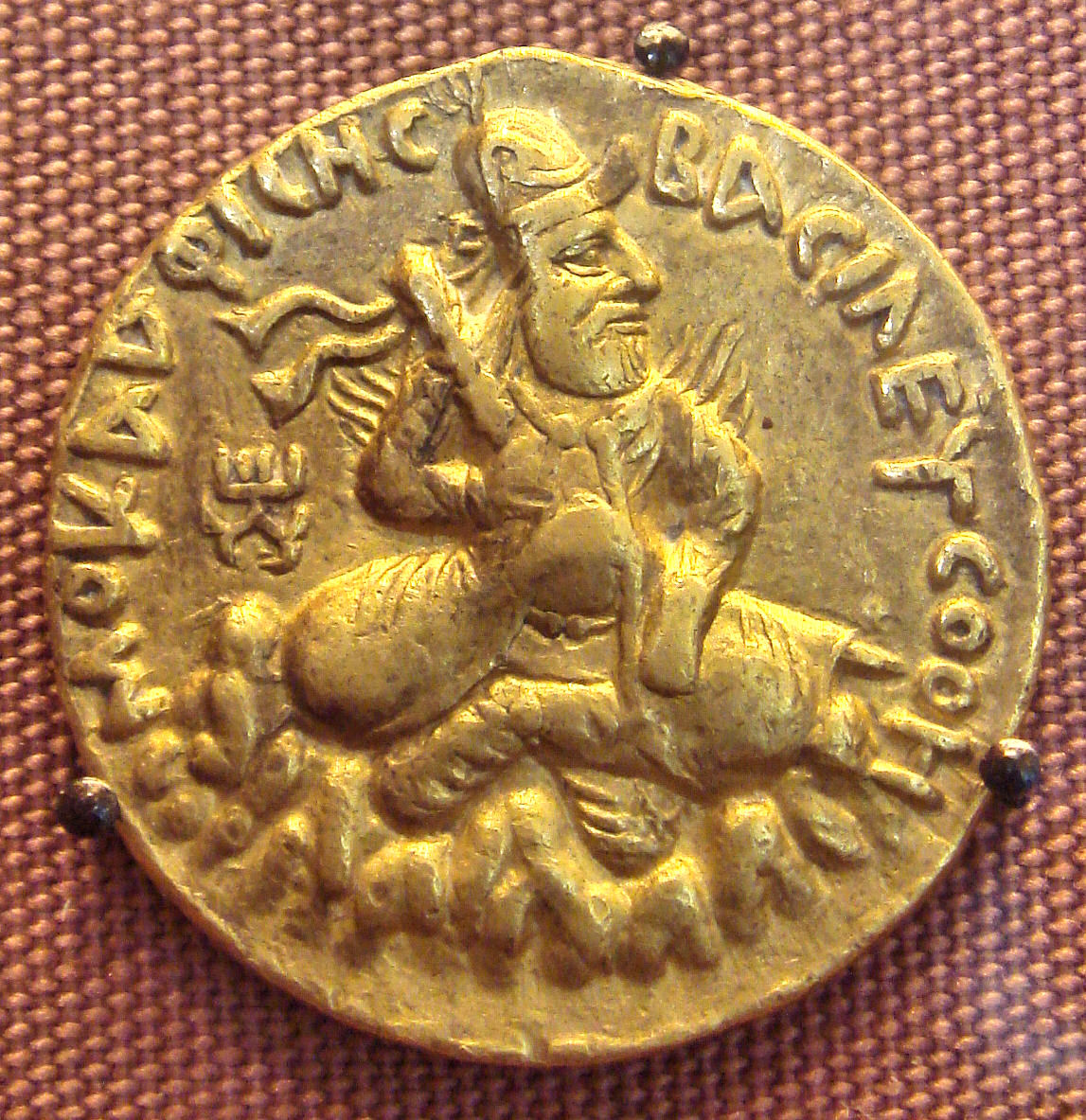
Coin of Vima

Vima in heavy coat, sitting cross-legged on a low couch

Vima riding a chariot

Vima seated on a throne, holding a thunderbolt

Bust of Vima, holding a club

Diademed head of Vima within a frame, trident battleaxe on reverse

Vima standing, making an offering over a small altar. Imperial title in Greek: ΒΑΣΙΛΕΥΣ ΒΑΣΙΛΕΩΝ ΣΩΤΗΡ ΜΕΓΑΣ ΟΟΗΜΟ ΚΑΔΦΙΣΗΣ

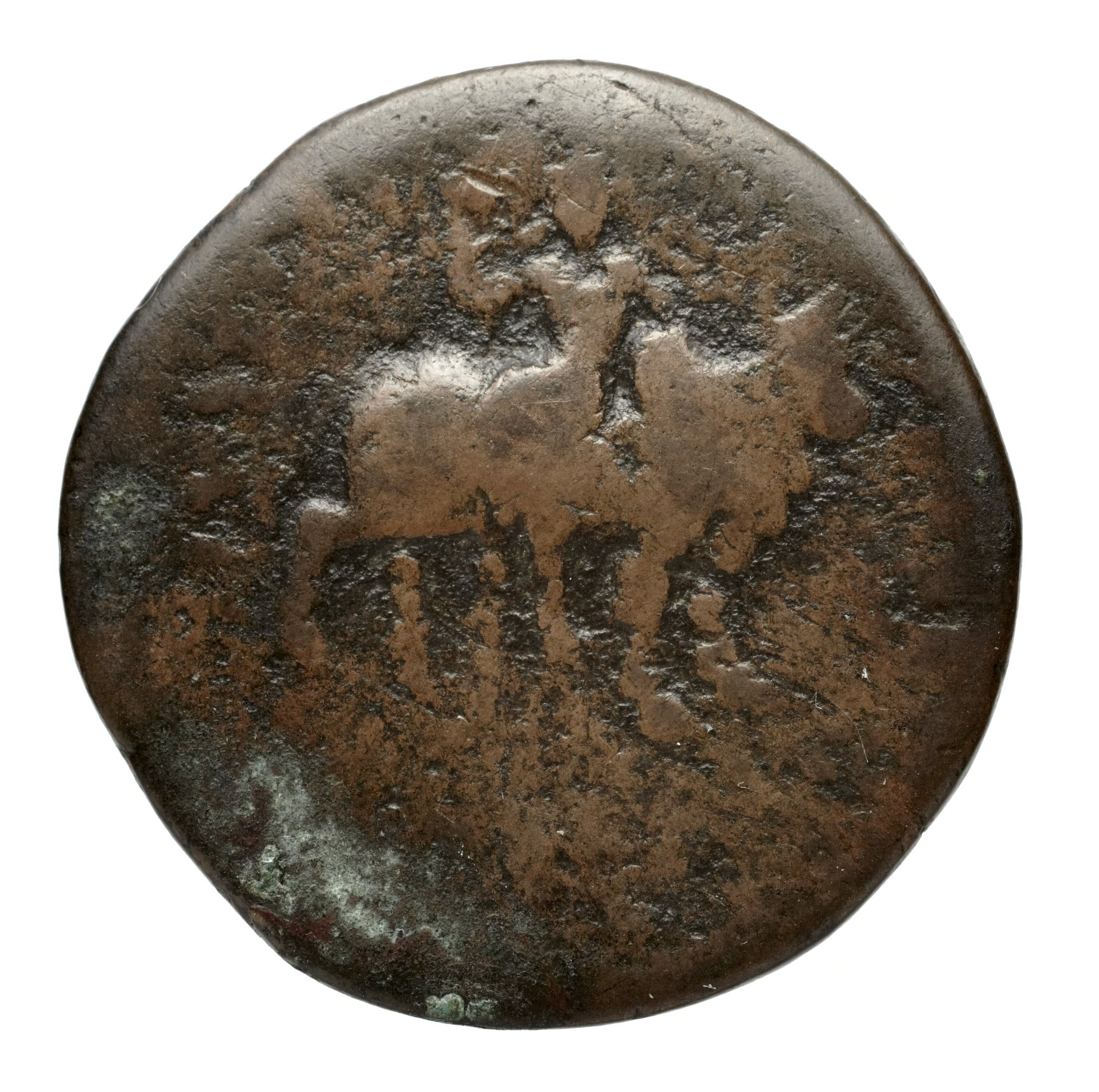

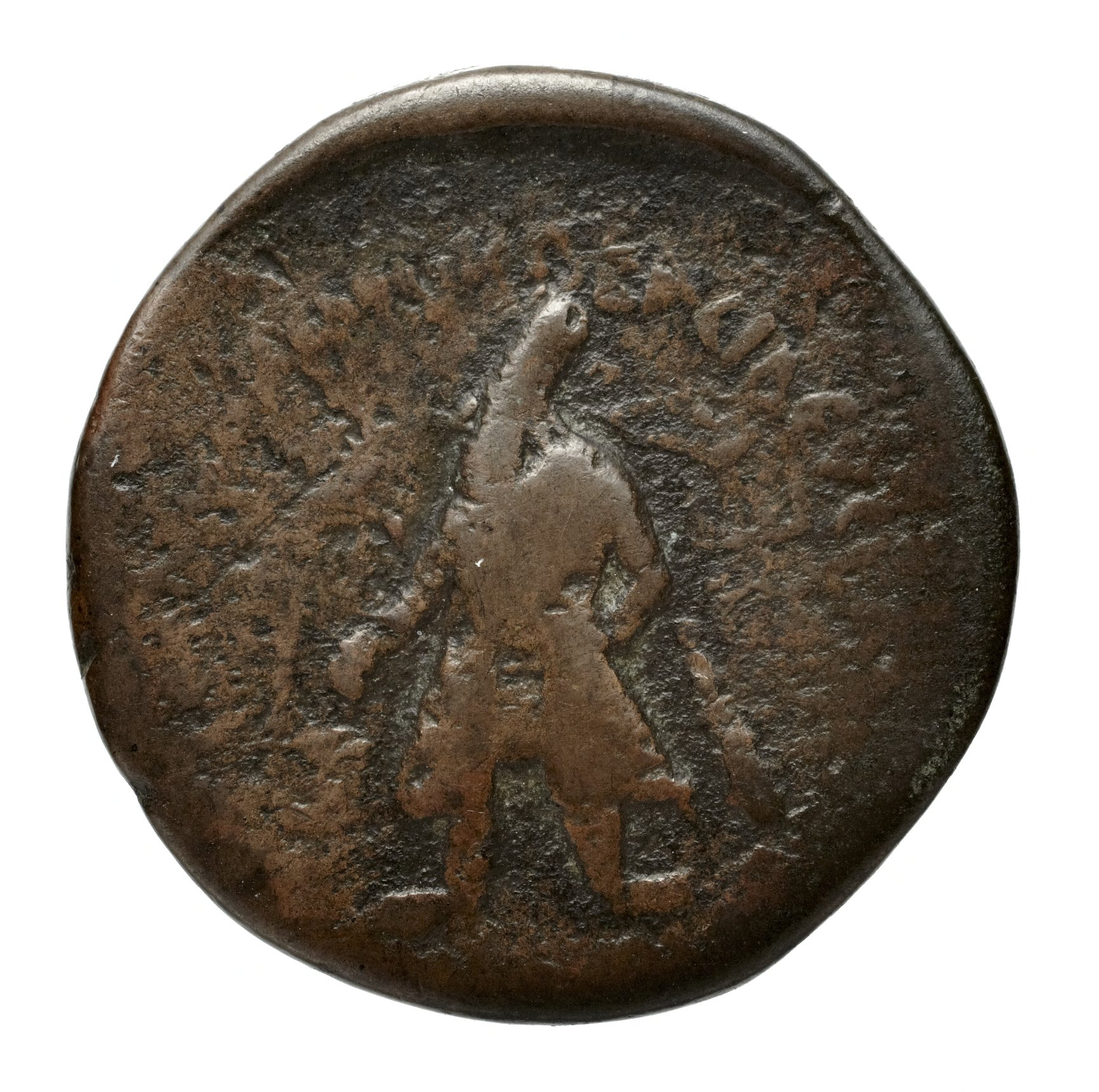

== Footnotes ==
Preceded by Vima Takto	Kushan Ruler; 90 – 100 CE	Succeeded by Kanishka

Territories/ dates	Western India	Western Pakistan Balochistan	Paropamisadae Arachosia	Bajaur	Gandhara	Western Punjab	Eastern Punjab	Mathura	Pataliputra
				INDO-SCYTHIAN KINGDOM			INDO-GREEK KINGDOM	INDO-SCYTHIAN Northern Satraps	
25 BCE – 10 CE				Indo-Scythian dynasty of the APRACHARAJAS; Vijayamitra (ruled 12 BCE – 15 CE) (Note: From the dated inscription on the Rukhana reliquary)	Liaka Kusulaka; Patika Kusulaka; Zeionises	Kharahostes (ruled 10 BCE– 10 CE); Mujatria	Strato II and Strato III	Hagana	
10-20CE		INDO-PARTHIAN KINGDOM; Gondophares		Indravasu	INDO-PARTHIAN KINGDOM; Gondophares		Rajuvula		
20–30 CE			Ubouzanes; Pakores	Vispavarma (ruled c. 0–20 CE)	Sarpedones		Bhadayasa	Sodasa	
30-40 CE			KUSHAN EMPIRE; Kujula Kadphises (c. 50–90)	Indravarma	Abdagases		...	...	
40–45 CE				Aspavarma	Gadana		...	...	
45–50 CE				Sasan	Sases		...	...	
50–75 CE							...	...	
75–100 CE	Indo-Scythian dynasty of the WESTERN SATRAPS; Chastana		Vima Takto (c. 90–113)				...	...	
100–120 CE	Abhiraka		Vima Kadphises (c. 113–127)						
120 CE	Bhumaka; Nahapana	PARATARAJAS; Yolamira	Kanishka I (c. 127–151)				Great Satrap Kharapallana and Satrap Vanaspara for Kanishka I		
130–230 CE	Jayadaman; Rudradaman I Damajadasri I Jivadaman; Rudrasimha I Isvaradatta; Rudrasimha I Jivadaman; Rudrasena I	Bagamira; Arjuna; Hvaramira; Mirahvara	Huvishka (c. 151 – c. 190); Vasudeva I (c. 190 – 230)						
230–250 CE	Samghadaman; Damasena; Damajadasri II; Viradaman; Yasodaman I Vijayasena; Damajadasri III; Rudrasena II; Visvasimha	Miratakhma; Kozana; Bhimarjuna; Koziya; Datarvharna; Datarvharna	KUSHANO-SASANIANS; Ardashir I (c. 230 – 250); Ardashir II (?-245)	Kanishka II (c. 230 – 247)					
250–280	Samghadaman; Damasena; Damajadasri II; Viradaman; Yasodaman I Vijayasena; Damajadasri III; Rudrasena II; Visvasimha	Miratakhma; Kozana; Bhimarjuna; Koziya; Datarvharna; Datarvharna	Peroz I, "Kushanshah" (c. 250 – 265); Hormizd I, "Kushanshah" (c. 265 – 295)			Vāsishka (c. 247 – 267); Kanishka III (c. 267 – 270)			
280–300	Bhratadarman	Datayola II	Hormizd II, "Kushanshah" (c. 295 – 300)			Vasudeva II (c. 267 – 300)		GUPTA EMPIRE; Chandragupta I Samudragupta; Chandragupta II	
300–320 CE	Visvasena; Rudrasimha II; Jivadaman		Peroz II, "Kushanshah" (c. 300 – 325)			Mahi (c. 300–305); Shaka (c. 305 – 335)		GUPTA EMPIRE; Chandragupta I Samudragupta; Chandragupta II	
320–388 CE	Yasodaman II; Rudradaman II; Rudrasena III; Simhasena; Rudrasena IV		Varahran I (325–350); Shapur II Sassanid king and "Kushanshah" (c. 350)			Kipunada (c. 335 – 350)		GUPTA EMPIRE; Chandragupta I Samudragupta; Chandragupta II	
388–396 CE	Rudrasimha III		KIDARITES invasion					GUPTA EMPIRE; Chandragupta I Samudragupta; Chandragupta II	
