= Kashan, Hormozgan =

Kashan كاشان
- Village
- Location within Iran
- Coordinates: 27°51′15″N 56°43′52″E
- Country: Iran
- Province: Hormozgan
- County: Hajjiabad
- Bakhsh: Ahmadi
- Rural District: Ahmadi

Population (2006)
  - Total: 73
- Time zone: UTC+3:30 (IRST)
  - Summer (DST): UTC+4:30 (IRDT)

Kashan (Persian: كاشان, also Romanized as Kāshān also known as Deh-e Kāshbarkān, Deh-e Kāshparkān, and Kāshparkān) is a village in Ahmadi Rural District, Ahmadi District, Hajjiabad County, Hormozgan Province, Iran. At the 2006 census, its population was 73, in 21 families.
