= Kashan, East Azerbaijan =

Kashan كاشان
- Village
- Location within Iran
- Coordinates: 38°28′30″N 46°59′12″E
- Country: Iran
- Province: East Azerbaijan
- County: Ahar
- Bakhsh: Central
- Rural District: Goyjah Bel

Population (2006)
  - Total: 99
- Time zone: UTC+3:30 (IRST)
  - Summer (DST): UTC+4:30 (IRDT)

Kashan (Persian: كاشان, romanized: Kāshān) is a village in Goyjah Bel Rural District, in the Central District of Ahar County, East Azerbaijan Province, Iran. At the 2006 census, its population was 99, in 17 families.
