= Kušan =

Kušan is a surname. Notable people with the surname include:

- Fran Kušan, Croatian botanist, an editor of Priroda
- Ivan Kušan (1933–2012), Croatian writer
- Tomislav Kušan (born 1994), Croatian handball player
