= Kujula Kadphises =

1st-century CE Kushan emperor

- Maharaja Rajarajasa; Devaputra
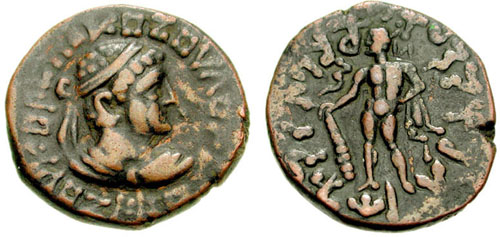
- Tetradrachm of Kujula Kadphises (30–80 CE) in the style of Hermaeus. Obv: Hermaios-style diademed bust. Corrupted Greek legend: ΒΑΣΙΛΕΩΣ ΣΤΗΡΟΣΣΥ ΕΡΜΑΙΟΥ ("Basileos Sterossy Hermaiou"): "King Hermaeus, the Saviour". Rev: Herakles standing with club and lion skin. Kharoṣṭhī legend: KUJULA KASASA KUSHANA YAVUGASA DHARMATHIDASA "Kujula Kadphises ruler of the Kushans, steadfast in the Law ("Dharma"). British Museum.
- Reign: 25 CE – 85 CE
- Predecessor: Heraios
- Successor: Vima Takto
- Died: 85 CE
- Dynasty: Kushan
- Religion: Hinduism

Kujula Kadphises (Kushan language: Κοζουλου Καδφιζου, also Κοζολα Καδαφες; Kharosthi: 𐨐𐨂𐨗𐨂𐨫 𐨐𐨯, IAST: Ku-ju-la Ka-sa, Kujula Kasa; Chinese: 丘就卻; pinyin: Qiūjiùquè; r. 30–80 CE, or 40–90 CE according to Bopearachchi. 25–85 CE as per Benjamin.) was a Kushan prince who united the Yuezhi confederation in Bactria during the 1st century CE, and became the first Kushan emperor. According to the Rabatak inscription, he was the great-grandfather of Kanishka I. He is considered the founder of the Kushan Empire.

== Names and titles ==
The origins of Kujula Kadphises are quite obscure, and he is usually believed to be a descendant of the Kushan ruler Heraios, or possibly identical with him. However, Kujula shares his name (Kushan: Κοζουλου on some of his "Hermaeus" coins, or Κοζολα on his "Augustus" coins) with some of the last Indo-Scythian rulers, such as Liaka Kusulaka (Greek: Λιακα Κοζουλο), or his son Patika Kusulaka, which might suggest some family connection. Kujula Kadphises, referred to himself on his coins, inscribed in the Indian Kharosthi script, as Maharaja Rajarajasa Devaputra Kujula Kara Kadphises, which translates to "Great King of Kings, Son of the Divine Being, Kujula Kadphises."

== History ==
=== Reign ===
Kujula Kadphises' reign is estimated to have lasted from approximately 25 to 85 CE, though the chronology of the Kushan rulers remains uncertain. During his reign, Kujula was a contemporary of Roman emperors such as Claudius, Nero, Vespasian, Titus, and Domitian. Latin sources mention "Indian" ambassadors received by some of these emperors, though it is unclear whether these representatives were independent merchants from the Indian subcontinent or officials of the Kushan Empire. Numismatic evidence points to Roman influence on early Kushan coinage. One notable series of copper tetradrachms issued by Kujula features an obverse bust modeled after Augustus and a curule chair on the reverse.

=== Chinese accounts ===
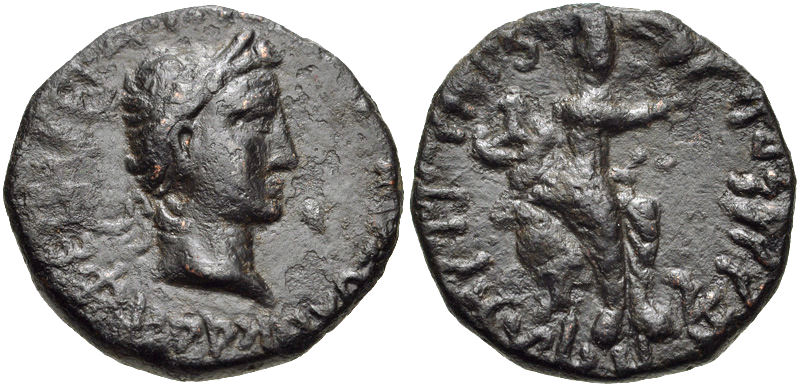
Coin of Kujula Kadphises, c. AD 30/50–80. Obv Laureate Julio-Claudian style head right. Greek legend around: ΚΟΖΟΛΑ ΚΑΔΑΦΕϹ XOPANOV ZAOOV. Rev Kujula Kadphises seated right, raising hand; tripartite symbol to left. Legend: Khushanasa Yauasa Kuyula Kaphasa Sacha Dhramatidasa.

In the process of their expansion eastward, Kujula Kadphises and his son Vima Takto (or Vema Tahktu) seem to have displaced the Indo-Parthian kingdom, established in northwestern India by the Parthian Gondophares since around 20 CE:

His son, Yangaozhen [probably Vema Tahktu or, possibly, his brother Sadaṣkaṇa], became king in his place. He defeated Tianzhu [North-western India] and installed Generals to supervise and lead it. The Yuezhi then became extremely rich. All the kingdoms call [their king] the Guishuang [Kushan] king, but the Han call them by their original name, Da Yuezhi [Great Yuezhi].

The invasion of the Indo-Parthian kingdom led by Kujula Kadphises is thought to have occurred some time after 45 CE, during the reign of Gondophares's successors: Abdagases and Sases.

=== Genealogy according to the Rabatak inscription ===
The connection of Kujula with other Kushan rulers is described in the Rabatak inscription, discovered in Rabatak in what was once Bactria in 1993, which was inscribed by Kanishka. Kanishka states Kujula Kadphises to be his great-grandfather, Vima Taktu to be his grandfather, Vima Kadphises to be his father, and himself Kanishka:

And he [Kanishka] gave orders to make images of the same, (namely) of these gods who are written herein, and he gave orders to make (them) for these kings: for King Kujula Kadphises (his) great grandfather, and for King Vima Taktu (his) grandfather, and for King Vima Kadphises (his) father, and for himself, King Kanishka.

=== Khalchayan ===
Some of the statues of the Khalchayan palatial site in Bactria, dated circa 50 CE, probably corresponded to the rule of Kujula Kadphises.

== Coinage ==
The coinage of the Kushan ruler, Kujula Kadphises, shows us the enlargement of the religious horizon of the Kushans. His first issue, which has the debased portrait and name of Hermaeus on the obverse, shows Heracles on the reverse, still following the Greek tradition, even though Heracles may be the interpretatio Graeca of the Iranian god Verethragna. Contrary to earlier assumptions, which regarded Kujula Kadphises as Buddhist on the basis of the epithet of the 'satyadharmasthita' epithet, it is now clear from the wording of a Mathura inscription, in which Huvishka bears the same epithet satyadharmasthita, that the kingdom was conferred upon him by Sarva (Shiva) and Scamdavira (Candavlra), that is, he was a devotee of the Hindu God, Shiva, and hence a firm Shaivite. It is striking to see that Kujula Kadphises has already adopted the worship of Siva and the use of Kharosthï script at such an early date.

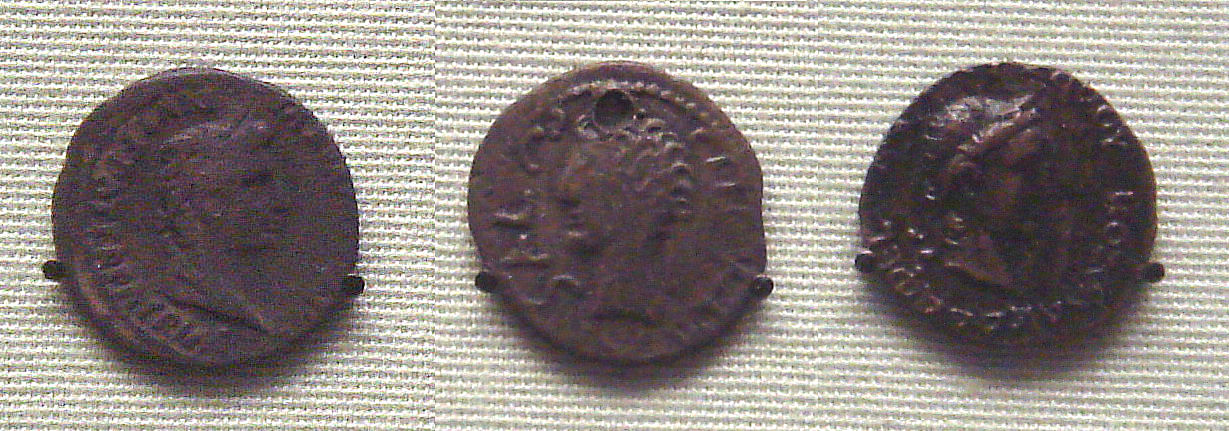
Left Silver denarius of Tiberius (14-37 CE) found in India. Center Indian copy of the same, 1st century CE. Right Coin of Kushan king Kujula Kadphises copying a coin of Augustus.

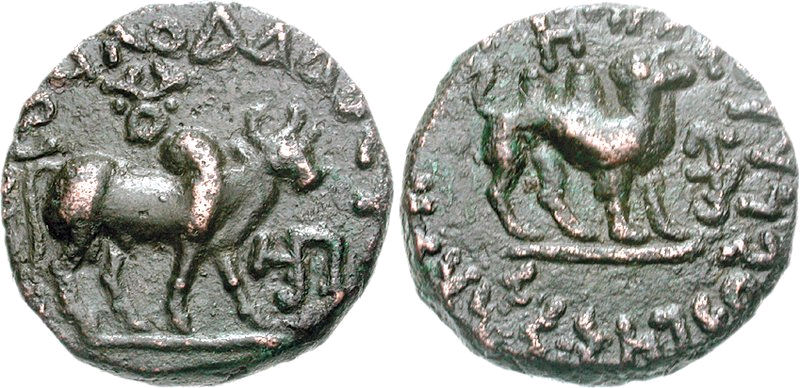
Kujula Kadphises Tetradrachm. Obv Brahma bull standing right, with Triratana above. Blundered Greek legend. Rev Camel standing right. Kharoshthi legend Maharayasa Rayatirayasa Kuyula Kara Kapasa.

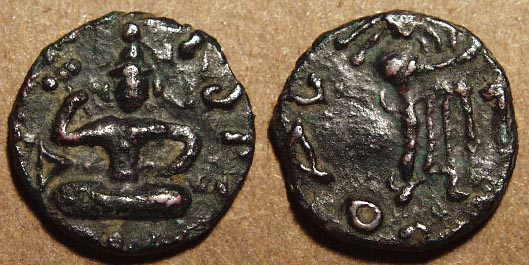
Coin of Kujula Kadphises.
Obv Kujula seated cross legged facing, Kharoshti legend: Kuyula Kadaphasa Kushanasa.
Rev Zeus on the reverse, Greek legend: ΚΟΖΟΛΑ XOPANOY ZAOOY.

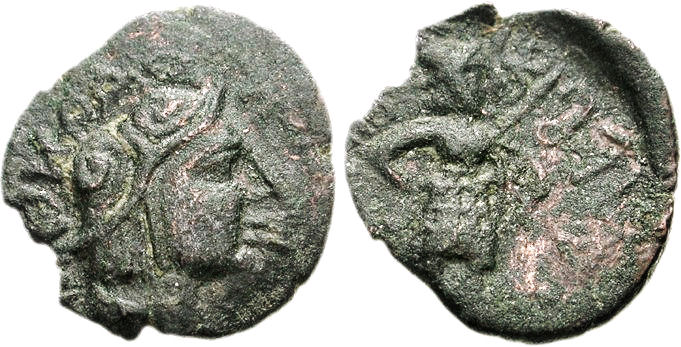
Kujula Kadphises coin. Obv Helmeted soldier head right. Rev Warrior standing right, holding shield and spear.

| Preceded by Heraios (Gandhara, Punjab) | Kushan Ruler; 30 – 80 CE | Succeeded by Heraios (as Kushan King) |
| Preceded by Vima Takto (as Indo-Parthian king) | Kushan Ruler; 30 – 80 CE | Succeeded by Heraios (as Kushan King) |

| Territories/ dates | Western India | Western Pakistan Balochistan | Paropamisadae Arachosia | Bajaur | Gandhara | Western Punjab | Eastern Punjab | Mathura | Pataliputra |
|---|---|---|---|---|---|---|---|---|---|
| | | | | INDO-SCYTHIAN KINGDOM | | | INDO-GREEK KINGDOM | INDO-SCYTHIAN Northern Satraps | |
| 25 BCE – 10 CE | | | | Indo-Scythian dynasty of the APRACHARAJAS; Vijayamitra (ruled 12 BCE – 15 CE) (Note: From the dated inscription on the Rukhana reliquary) | Liaka Kusulaka; Patika Kusulaka; Zeionises | Kharahostes (ruled 10 BCE– 10 CE); Mujatria | Strato II and Strato III | Hagana | |
| 10-20CE | | INDO-PARTHIAN KINGDOM; Gondophares | | Indravasu | INDO-PARTHIAN KINGDOM; Gondophares | | Rajuvula | | |
| 20–30 CE | | | Ubouzanes; Pakores | Vispavarma (ruled c. 0–20 CE) | Sarpedones | | Bhadayasa | Sodasa | |
| 30-40 CE | | | KUSHAN EMPIRE; Kujula Kadphises (c. 50–90) | Indravarma | Abdagases | | ... | ... | |
| 40–45 CE | | | | Aspavarma | Gadana | | ... | ... | |
| 45–50 CE | | | | Sasan | Sases | | ... | ... | |
| 50–75 CE | | | | | | | ... | ... | |
| 75–100 CE | Indo-Scythian dynasty of the WESTERN SATRAPS; Chastana | | Vima Takto (c. 90–113) | | | | ... | ... | |
| 100–120 CE | Abhiraka | | Vima Kadphises (c. 113–127) | | | | | | |
| 120 CE | Bhumaka; Nahapana | PARATARAJAS; Yolamira | Kanishka I (c. 127–151) | | | | Great Satrap Kharapallana and Satrap Vanaspara for Kanishka I | | |
| 130–230 CE | Jayadaman; Rudradaman I Damajadasri I Jivadaman; Rudrasimha I Isvaradatta; Rudrasimha I Jivadaman; Rudrasena I | Bagamira; Arjuna; Hvaramira; Mirahvara | Huvishka (c. 151 – c. 190); Vasudeva I (c. 190 – 230) | | | | | | |
| 230–250 CE | Samghadaman; Damasena; Damajadasri II; Viradaman; Yasodaman I Vijayasena; Damajadasri III; Rudrasena II; Visvasimha | Miratakhma; Kozana; Bhimarjuna; Koziya; Datarvharna; Datarvharna | KUSHANO-SASANIANS; Ardashir I (c. 230 – 250); Ardashir II (?-245) | Kanishka II (c. 230 – 247) | | | | | |
| 250–280 | Samghadaman; Damasena; Damajadasri II; Viradaman; Yasodaman I Vijayasena; Damajadasri III; Rudrasena II; Visvasimha | Miratakhma; Kozana; Bhimarjuna; Koziya; Datarvharna; Datarvharna | Peroz I, "Kushanshah" (c. 250 – 265); Hormizd I, "Kushanshah" (c. 265 – 295) | | | Vāsishka (c. 247 – 267); Kanishka III (c. 267 – 270) | | | |
| 280–300 | Bhratadarman | Datayola II | Hormizd II, "Kushanshah" (c. 295 – 300) | | | Vasudeva II (c. 267 – 300) | | GUPTA EMPIRE; Chandragupta I Samudragupta; Chandragupta II | |
| 300–320 CE | Visvasena; Rudrasimha II; Jivadaman | | Peroz II, "Kushanshah" (c. 300 – 325) | | | Mahi (c. 300–305); Shaka (c. 305 – 335) | | GUPTA EMPIRE; Chandragupta I Samudragupta; Chandragupta II | |
| 320–388 CE | Yasodaman II; Rudradaman II; Rudrasena III; Simhasena; Rudrasena IV | | Varahran I (325–350); Shapur II Sassanid king and "Kushanshah" (c. 350) | | | Kipunada (c. 335 – 350) | | GUPTA EMPIRE; Chandragupta I Samudragupta; Chandragupta II | |
| 388–396 CE | Rudrasimha III | | KIDARITES invasion | | | | | GUPTA EMPIRE; Chandragupta I Samudragupta; Chandragupta II | |
