= Vima Takto =

1st-century Kushan emperor

- King of Kings
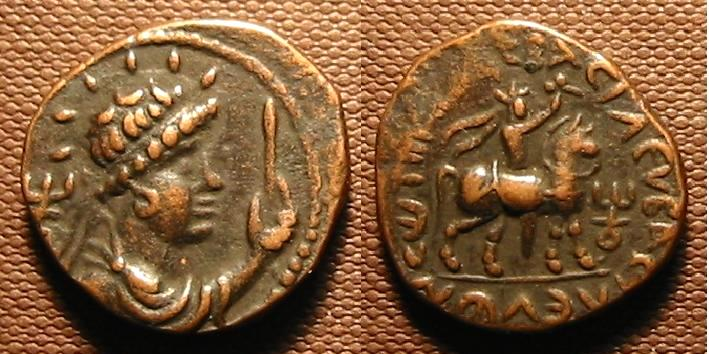
- Bronze coin of Vima Takto, alias "Soter Megas" (r. c. 80–90 CE). Obv: Bust of Vima Takto, with Greek royal headband and radiate, holding sceptre; three-pronged tamgha behind. Rev: Mounted king with Greek royal headband, holding a sceptre. Three-pronged tamgha; corrupted Greek legend ΒΑΣΙΛΕΥ ΒΑΣΙΛΕΥΩΝ ΣΩΤΗΡ ΜΕΓΑΣ "Basileu Basileuon Soter Megas": "The King of Kings, Great Saviour".

Kushan emperor
- Reign: 80–90 CE
- Predecessor: Kujula Kadphises
- Successor: Vima Kadphises
- House: Kushan
- Religion: Hinduism

Vima Takto or Vima Taktu (Greco-Bactrian: Οοημο Τακτοο, Oēmo Taktoo; Kharosthi: 𐨬𐨅𐨨 𐨟𐨑𐨆 Ve-ma Ta-kho, Vema Takho) was a Kushan emperor who reigned c. 80–90 CE.

== Rule ==
Vima Takto was long known as "The nameless King", since his coins only showed the legend "The King of Kings, Great Saviour", until the discovery of the Rabatak inscription helped connect his name with the title on the coins.

Vima Takto's empire covered northwestern India and Bactria towards China, where Kushan presence has been asserted in the Tarim Basin. During his reign, Kushan embassies were also sent to the Eastern Han imperial court.

=== Genealogy ===
He is mentioned in the Chinese historical chronicle Book of the Later Han, in relation to his father Kujula Kadphises:

"Qiujiuque (Ch: 丘就卻) [Kujula Kadphises] was more than eighty years old when he died. His son, Yangaozhen (Ch:閻高珍) [probably Vema Tahk(tu) or, possibly, his brother Sadaṣkaṇa], became king in his place. He defeated Tianzhu [North-western India] and installed Generals to supervise and lead it. The Yuezhi then became extremely rich. All the kingdoms call [their king] the Guishuang [Kushan] king, but the Han call them by their original name, Da Yuezhi."

The connection of Vima Takto with other Kushan rulers is described in the Rabatak inscription, which was written by Kanishka. Kanishka makes the list of the kings who ruled up to his time: Kujula Kadphises as his great-grandfather, Vima Takto as his grandfather, Vima Kadphises as his father, and himself Kanishka:

"... for King Kujula Kadphises (his) great grandfather, and for King Vima Taktu (his) grandfather, and for King Vima Kadphises (his) father, and *also for himself, King Kanishka" (Cribb and Sims-Williams 1995/6: 80)

A later inscription found at Vima's sanctuary at Mat, also records that he was the grandfather of Huvishka.

Preceded by Kujula Kadphises	Kushan Ruler; 80 – 90 CE	Succeeded by Vima Kadphises

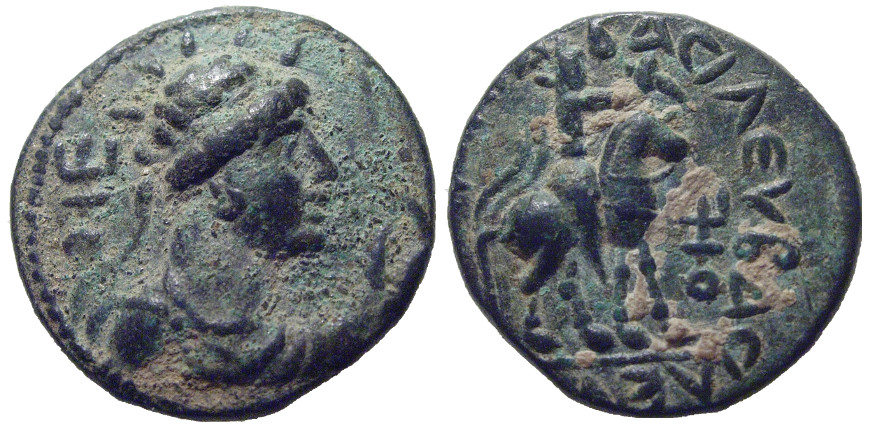
A bronze coin of Vima Takto (Soter Megas) from c 80–110AD discovered in Northern Pakistan.

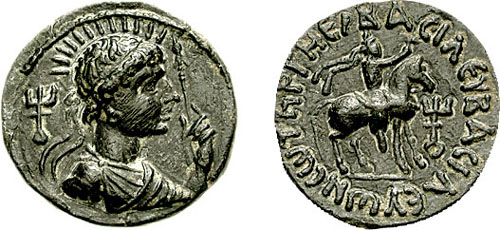
Another bronze coin of Vima Takto.

== Footnotes ==
Territories/ dates	Western India	Western Pakistan Balochistan	Paropamisadae Arachosia	Bajaur	Gandhara	Western Punjab	Eastern Punjab	Mathura	Pataliputra
				INDO-SCYTHIAN KINGDOM			INDO-GREEK KINGDOM	INDO-SCYTHIAN Northern Satraps	
25 BCE – 10 CE				Indo-Scythian dynasty of the APRACHARAJAS; Vijayamitra (ruled 12 BCE – 15 CE) (Note: From the dated inscription on the Rukhana reliquary)	Liaka Kusulaka; Patika Kusulaka; Zeionises	Kharahostes (ruled 10 BCE– 10 CE); Mujatria	Strato II and Strato III	Hagana	
10-20CE		INDO-PARTHIAN KINGDOM; Gondophares		Indravasu	INDO-PARTHIAN KINGDOM; Gondophares		Rajuvula		
20–30 CE			Ubouzanes; Pakores	Vispavarma (ruled c. 0–20 CE)	Sarpedones		Bhadayasa	Sodasa	
30-40 CE			KUSHAN EMPIRE; Kujula Kadphises (c. 50–90)	Indravarma	Abdagases		...	...	
40–45 CE				Aspavarma	Gadana		...	...	
45–50 CE				Sasan	Sases		...	...	
50–75 CE							...	...	
75–100 CE	Indo-Scythian dynasty of the WESTERN SATRAPS; Chastana		Vima Takto (c. 90–113)				...	...	
100–120 CE	Abhiraka		Vima Kadphises (c. 113–127)						
120 CE	Bhumaka; Nahapana	PARATARAJAS; Yolamira	Kanishka I (c. 127–151)				Great Satrap Kharapallana and Satrap Vanaspara for Kanishka I		
130–230 CE	Jayadaman; Rudradaman I Damajadasri I Jivadaman; Rudrasimha I Isvaradatta; Rudrasimha I Jivadaman; Rudrasena I	Bagamira; Arjuna; Hvaramira; Mirahvara	Huvishka (c. 151 – c. 190); Vasudeva I (c. 190 – 230)						
230–250 CE	Samghadaman; Damasena; Damajadasri II; Viradaman; Yasodaman I Vijayasena; Damajadasri III; Rudrasena II; Visvasimha	Miratakhma; Kozana; Bhimarjuna; Koziya; Datarvharna; Datarvharna	KUSHANO-SASANIANS; Ardashir I (c. 230 – 250); Ardashir II (?-245)	Kanishka II (c. 230 – 247)					
250–280	Samghadaman; Damasena; Damajadasri II; Viradaman; Yasodaman I Vijayasena; Damajadasri III; Rudrasena II; Visvasimha	Miratakhma; Kozana; Bhimarjuna; Koziya; Datarvharna; Datarvharna	Peroz I, "Kushanshah" (c. 250 – 265); Hormizd I, "Kushanshah" (c. 265 – 295)			Vāsishka (c. 247 – 267); Kanishka III (c. 267 – 270)			
280–300	Bhratadarman	Datayola II	Hormizd II, "Kushanshah" (c. 295 – 300)			Vasudeva II (c. 267 – 300)		GUPTA EMPIRE; Chandragupta I Samudragupta; Chandragupta II	
300–320 CE	Visvasena; Rudrasimha II; Jivadaman		Peroz II, "Kushanshah" (c. 300 – 325)			Mahi (c. 300–305); Shaka (c. 305 – 335)		GUPTA EMPIRE; Chandragupta I Samudragupta; Chandragupta II	
320–388 CE	Yasodaman II; Rudradaman II; Rudrasena III; Simhasena; Rudrasena IV		Varahran I (325–350); Shapur II Sassanid king and "Kushanshah" (c. 350)			Kipunada (c. 335 – 350)		GUPTA EMPIRE; Chandragupta I Samudragupta; Chandragupta II	
388–396 CE	Rudrasimha III		KIDARITES invasion					GUPTA EMPIRE; Chandragupta I Samudragupta; Chandragupta II	
