= Hetao =

Region in China

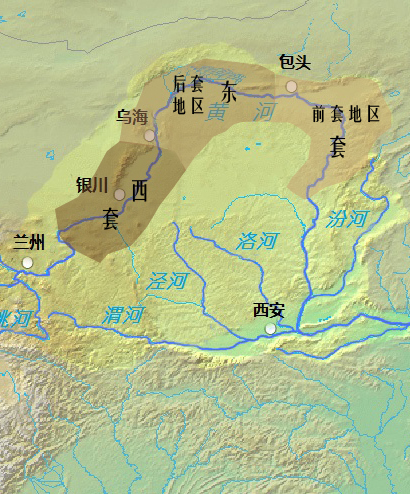
The Hetao region's three sections: "West Loop" (brown), "Back Loop" (light brown), and "Front Loop" (yellow)

Hetao (Chinese: 河套; pinyin: Hétào; lit. 'river loop'; Mongolian: Бор тохой) is a C-shaped region in northwestern China consisting of a collection of flood plains stretching along the banks of the northern half of the Ordos Loop, a large northerly rectangular bend of the Yellow River that forms the river's entire middle section. The region makes up the northern margin of the Ordos Basin, bounded in the west by the Helan Mountains, the north by the Yin Mountains, the east by the northern portion of Lüliang Mountains, and the south by the Ordos Desert and the Loess Plateau (separated by the course of the Ming Great Wall).

The Hetao region is divided into two main sections — the "West Loop" (Chinese: 西套; pinyin: Xītào) in Ningxia, and the "East Loop" (Chinese: 东套; pinyin: Dōngtào) in Inner Mongolia. The west section includes the alluvial Yinchuan Plain (Chinese: 银川平原, a.k.a. Ningxia Plain) around Shizuishan, Yinchuan, and Wuzhong, and the Weining Plain (Chinese: 卫宁平原) around Zhongwei. The east section is further divided into two parts — the western "Back Loop" (Chinese: 后套; pinyin: Hòutào), which includes the Bayannur Plain (Chinese: 巴彦淖尔平原) around Bayannur and Wuhai; and the eastern "Front Loop" Chinese: 前套; pinyin: Qiántào), which includes the Tumochuan Plain (Chinese: 土默川平原) around Baotou and Hohhot.

Unlike the arid desert/steppe environment nearby, the Hetao plains are fertile grasslands quite suitable for pastoral and agricultural activities, and was frequently used by various Eurasian nomads as a staging area for raiding east into the Central Plain and south into the Loess Plateau and Guanzhong Region. Throughout Chinese history, this region was of major strategic importance against northern invaders, particularly during the Han and Tang dynasties.
