= Ordos Plateau =

Highland sedimentary basin in northwest China

Chinese name
- Traditional Chinese: 鄂爾多斯
- Simplified Chinese: 鄂尔多斯
Transcriptions
Standard Mandarin
- Hanyu Pinyin: Èěrduōsī
- Wade–Giles: Ê^{4}-êrh^{3}-to^{1}-ssŭ^{1}

Mongolian name
- Mongolian script: ᠣᠷᠳᠣᠰ
Transcriptions
- SASM/GNC: Ordos

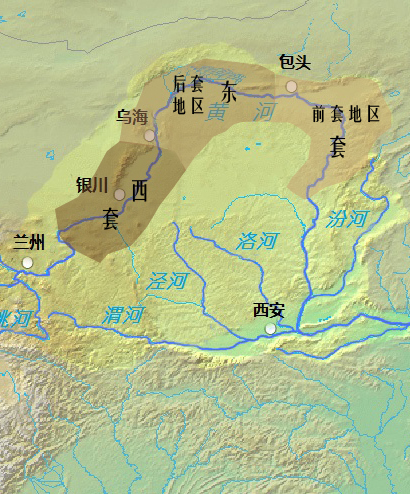
The Yellow River loop covering the Ordos Plateau

The Ordos Plateau, also known as the Ordos Basin, the Ordos, or the Shaan-Gan-Ning Basin, is a highland sedimentary basin in parts of northernmost China with an elevation of 1,000–1,600 m (3,300–5,200 ft), and consisting mostly of land enclosed by the "Ordos Loop", a northerly rectangular bend of the Yellow River. It is China's second largest sedimentary basin (after the Tarim Basin) with a total area of 370,000 km^{2} (140,000 sq mi). The Ordos includes territories from five provinces: Shaanxi, Gansu, Ningxia, Inner Mongolia, and a thin fringe of Shanxi (western border counties of Xinzhou, Lüliang and Linfen), but is demographically dominated by the former three, hence the area is sometimes also called the "Shaan-Gan-Ning Basin". The basin is bounded in the east by the Lüliang Mountains, north by the Yin Mountains, west by the Helan Mountains, and south by the Huanglong Mountains, Meridian Ridge and Liupan Mountains.

The name "Ordos" (Mongolian:) comes from the orda, which originally means "palaces" or "court" in Old Turkic. The seventh largest prefecture of Inner Mongolia, Ordos City, is similarly named due to its location within the Ordos Loop.

The Ming Great Wall cuts southwesterly across the center of the Ordos region, roughly separating the sparsely populated north (or "upper Ordos", which is actually lower in elevation than the "lower Ordos" south) — considered the Ordos proper — from the agricultural south (or "lower Ordos", i.e. northern part of the Loess Plateau). The north Ordos consists mainly of the arid Ordos Desert (subdivided into the Mu Us and Kubuqi deserts), which is administered by Inner Mongolia's Ordos City, but the floodplains along the banks of Ordos Loop's northern bends are fertile grasslands historically known as the Hetao Plains ("river loop" plains), which is subdivided into the "west loop" (within Ningxia) and "east loop" (within Inner Mongolia, further divided into "front loop" and "back loop") sections. The Inner Mongolian cities of Hohhot (provincial capital), Baotou, Bayannur and Wuhai (its third, fourth, eighth and eleventh most populous prefectures respectively), and all of Ningxia's cities except Guyuan, are all located on these riverside plains along the Hetao region. Throughout Chinese history, the Hetao region was of major strategic importance and therefore hotly contested against various Eurasian nomads such as Di and Rong (Shang and Zhou dynasties), Xiongnu (Qin and Han dynasty), Rouran (Northern Wei), Eastern Göktürk (Sui and Tang dynasty) and Mongols (Ming dynasty).

The more populous south Ordos is traversed by the upper reaches of Wei River's two largest tributaries, the Jing and Luo Rivers, whose valleys cut through the mountain ranges east of Tianshui and south of Pingliang, Qingyang and Yan'an to drain into the crescentic Guanzhong Plain on the other side. The south Ordos and the Guanzhong Plain together were one of the cradles of Chinese civilization and remains densely populated throughout history. The largest city in the Guanzhong region, Xi'an, is the 10th largest Chinese city and the most populous settlement in the entire Northwest China, and had long served as the capital of China in more than a dozen ancient dynasties.

The area is of high archaeological interest. Skeletal remains and artifacts show the Ordosian culture occupied the area in the Upper Paleolithic. The late Neolithic saw the development or introduction of the Zhukaigou culture, which was followed by the iron-wielding Ordos culture.

== Geography ==
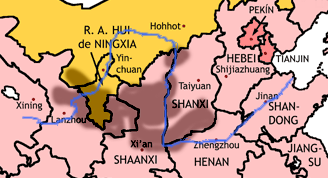
Provincial boundaries. The Loess Plateau is shaded. The Yellow River is colored blue. The yellow area is Inner Mongolia and Ningxia.

The Yellow River flows from its source in the Sanjiangyuan National Nature Reserve on the Tibetan Plateau in a roughly eastern course before turning northwest after its confluence with the Bai He ("White River") in Maqu County, Gansu. After reversing course back towards the east, it begins the massive Ordos Loop by turning northwards at Zhongning County in Ningxia. It runs northwards about 640 kilometers (398 mi), leaving the Loess Plateau—whose eroded silt produces the river's yellow color—for the Ordos proper before turning east in Inner Mongolia. It continues this course for about 320 kilometers (199 mi) before Shaanxi's Lüliang Mountains force it sharply southwards. The eastern side of the loop runs about 600 kilometers (373 mi), re-entering the Loess Plateau before reaching its confluence with the Wei River at Tongguan in Shaanxi and again turning sharply eastward. It then flows through Henan's Hangu Pass to enter the North China Plain.

The Wei River largely forms a southern side of the imperfect rectangle formed by these curves of the Yellow River, flowing about 560 kilometers (348 mi) through the Loess Plateau from a source not far from its southwestern corner to a confluence at the southeastern corner. The Qin Mountains—including the famous Mount Hua—separate its watershed from that of the Han River, which flows south to a confluence with the Yangtze at Wuhan.

Underlying the loess plateau is one of the largest coal beds in China.

=== Climate ===
Rainfall and therefore population decreases rapidly as one moves north. The Wei River valley on the south is densely populated and is one of the ancient centers of Chinese civilization. The north is grassland and desert (Ordos desert) and is part of Inner Mongolia. Because of its low and variable rainfall the region was once notorious for drought and famine.

=== Along the two rivers ===
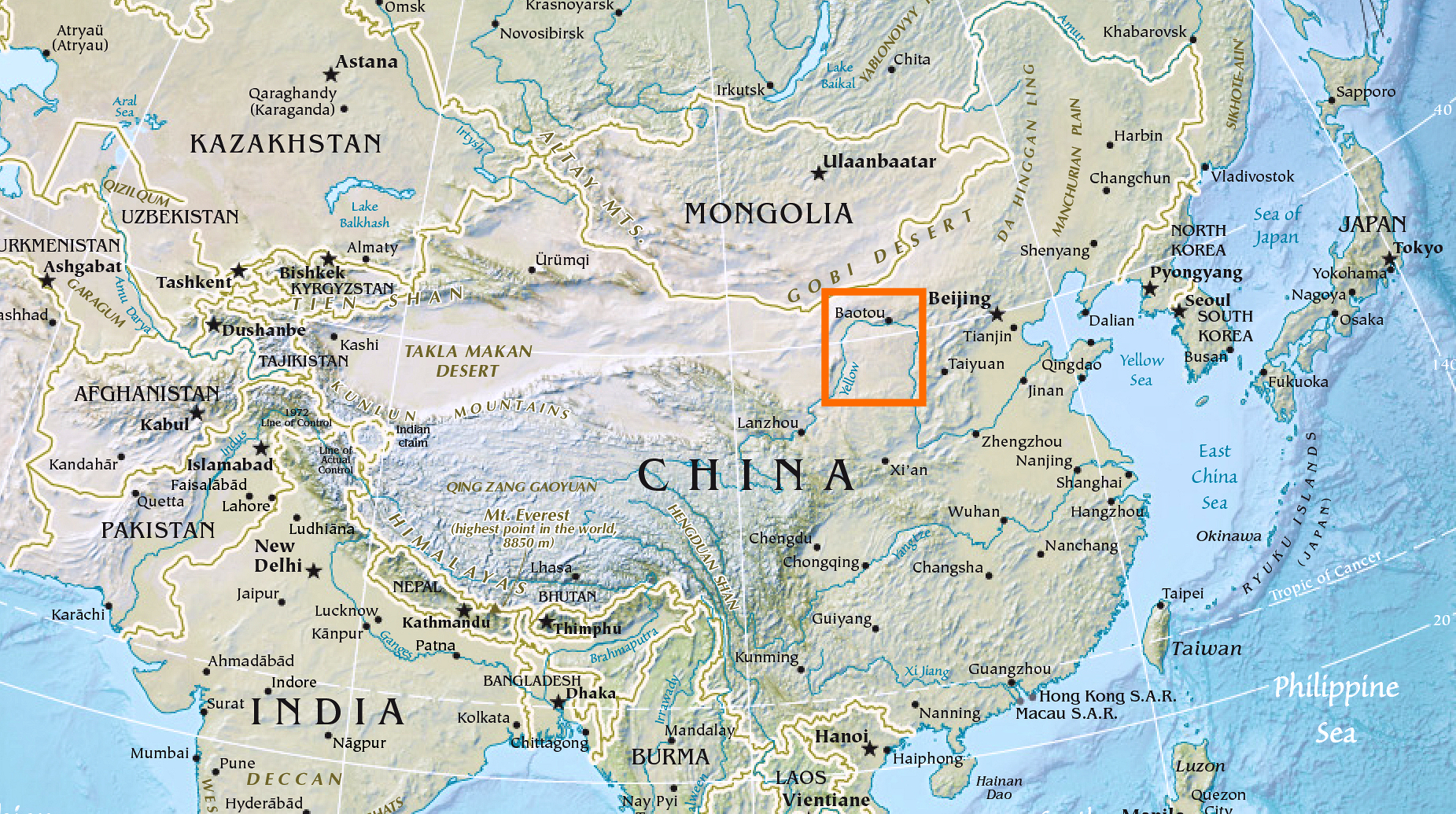
The location of the Ordos culture on the Ordos Plateau, also known as the Ordos Loop due to the shape of the Yellow River enclosing its northern, eastern, and western sides

At the southwest corner near where the Yellow River emerges from the Tibetan Plateau is Lanzhou, the westernmost large city in north China and the capital of Gansu. To the west of Lanzhou is Xining from whence caravans (and now the railway) started for Lhasa. North of Xining the Gansu or Hexi Corridor runs along the northern edge of the Tibetan Plateau. This corridor and the Wei River valley became the main Silk Road route from China proper to the Tarim Basin and westward. Downriver (north) from Lanzhou is a gorge through Gaolan County and Baiyin. The river emerges from the mountains and enters Ningxia near Zhongwei. It runs east with the Tengger Desert in Inner Mongolia to the north and hills to the south. It turns north through dry country to past the Qingtongxia dam to the irrigated area around Wuzhong City. It continues north past Yinchuan, the capital of Ningxia. To the west are the Helan Mountains. The river leaves the northern tip of Ningxia south of Wuhai, flows through desert and enters a large irrigated area at Dengkou. At the northwest corner the Lang Shan mountains force the river to turn east near Linhe. Here there is an irrigated area between the mountains and river and desert to the southeast. Near the center of the northern stretch is the large town and irrigated area of Baotou. The main road south runs from Baotou to Xi'an. About 70 miles northeast of the northeast bend is Hohot, the capital of Inner Mongolia. The river turns south, enters the Loess Plateau and forms a gorge at least 200 feet below the surrounding hills. There are no large towns in this region. There is a dam apparently called Wanjia and another further south and then the Hukou Waterfall of the Yellow River, the second highest in China. The river leaves the gorge near Hancheng, receives the Fen River from the east and the Wei River from the west. At its juncture with the Wei the Yellow River turns east toward the North China Plain. One can go upstream on the Wei with the Qin Mountains with Mount Hua on the south past Weinan to Xi'an, a former capital of China and now a large city. West of Xi'an is Xianyang, the Qin dynasty capital. The river exits the mountains west of Baoji. There is a dam, the river narrows and becomes yellow and the railroad needs many bridges and tunnels all the way to Tianshui. Upstream various tributaries extend in the direction of Lanzhou.

== History ==
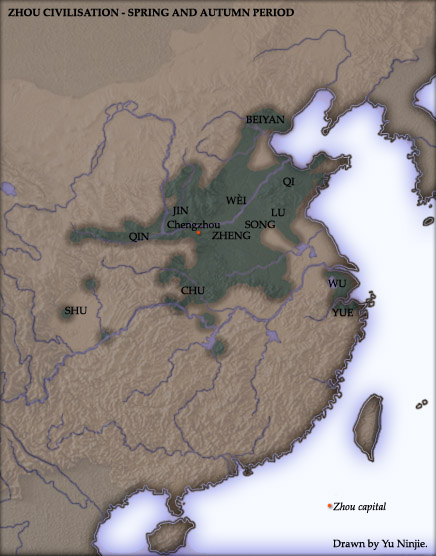
Approximate area of Chinese civilization during the Spring and Autumn period. Note the extension up the Wei valley

Although this rectangular area is obvious on a map, the north and south of the area are so different that the region cannot be said to have a common history.

The south and east of the plateau belong historically and culturally to China, for which see Prehistory and History of China.

The north and west, the grassland and desert, belongs historically and culturally to nomads. The region had been occupied by humans since at least Upper Paleolithic, when the culture may be known as the Ordosian culture. The Ordosian culture, also sometimes called the Ordos culture, is documented from the Upper Palaeolithic. The points and sides of their tools indicate a "Moustero-Levalloisian" element. They seemed to have a masterful knowledge of Upper Palaeolithic technology, producing blades as much as fifteen centimeters long.

By about 1000 BC Chinese civilization was centered on the west side of the North China Plain with an extension up the Wei valley and a northern extension up the Fen River. The lower Wei valley is still one of the most densely populated areas in China. Rulers based in the Wei valley had an advantage since the mountains to the east made a natural fortification and war horses were readily available from the northern grasslands. The Zhou dynasty and the Qin dynasty started in the Wei valley. Xi'an on the lower Wei was several times the capital of China. By the Tang dynasty the economic center of China had shifted to the Yangzi valley and the Wei region became partly dependent of food imported up the Grand Canal.

The Ordosian culture was followed by the Zhukaigou culture of the late Neolithic and early Bronze Age. While the Zhukaigou culture population appears to have been exclusively Mongoloid, as known from their skeletal remains and artifacts, the Ordos culture is thought to have been the most eastern extension of Eurasian nomads, and at least partly of Europoid peoples. Under the Qin and Han dynasties the area came under at least loose Chinese control. The Zhukaigou culture is one of the Neolithic cultures at Ordos, dated between 2200 and 1500 BC. It is associated with about 327 burials, with recent maternal genetic evidence showing that they were related to the remains from Yinniugou, as well as modern populations like Daurs and Evenks. The archaeological finds at the site are similar to those of the lower Xiajiadian culture. These finds are important as they are associated with the development of snake pattern designs on the decoration of weapon and animal-depicting artifacts which later would become a characteristic style of the Ordos. The skeletal remains at Taohongbala (桃紅巴拉) tomb dated to between the 7th and 6th centuries BC are generally identified as belonging to the Xiongnu bronze culture and show strong Mongoloid features. A similar type of burial at Hulusitai around Bayannur, uncovered in 1979 and dated to between the 5th and 4th centuries BCE, is considered the only Xiongnu site along the northern slope of Yinshan. The site consisted of mainly bronze artifacts and pottery and 27 horse skeletal remains. Further excavation in 1983 at Guoxianyaozi uncovered a total of 31 burials dated to the 6th to 5th century BC revealing strong north Mongoloid features. These generally decreased towards the south, and skeletal remains of east and north Mongoloid type can be seen from finds in Maoqinggou and Yinniugou dated to around the 7th century BC, amounting to a total of 117 burials. Many bronze weapons of these cultures are similar to those of Chinese style. Depictions of the Ordos people tend to show straight hair. This is especially true of archaeological finds from Baotou (M63:22, M63:23, M84:5), Etuoke (M1, M6), Xihaokou (M3), lower Woertuhao (M3:1), and Mengjialiang.

Horse nomads occupied the area of the Ordos Plateau previously settled by the Zhukaigou culture from the 6th to the 2nd century BC, creating the Ordos culture, before being driven away by the Xiongnu. The Ordos Plateau contained the best pasture lands on the Asian steppe.

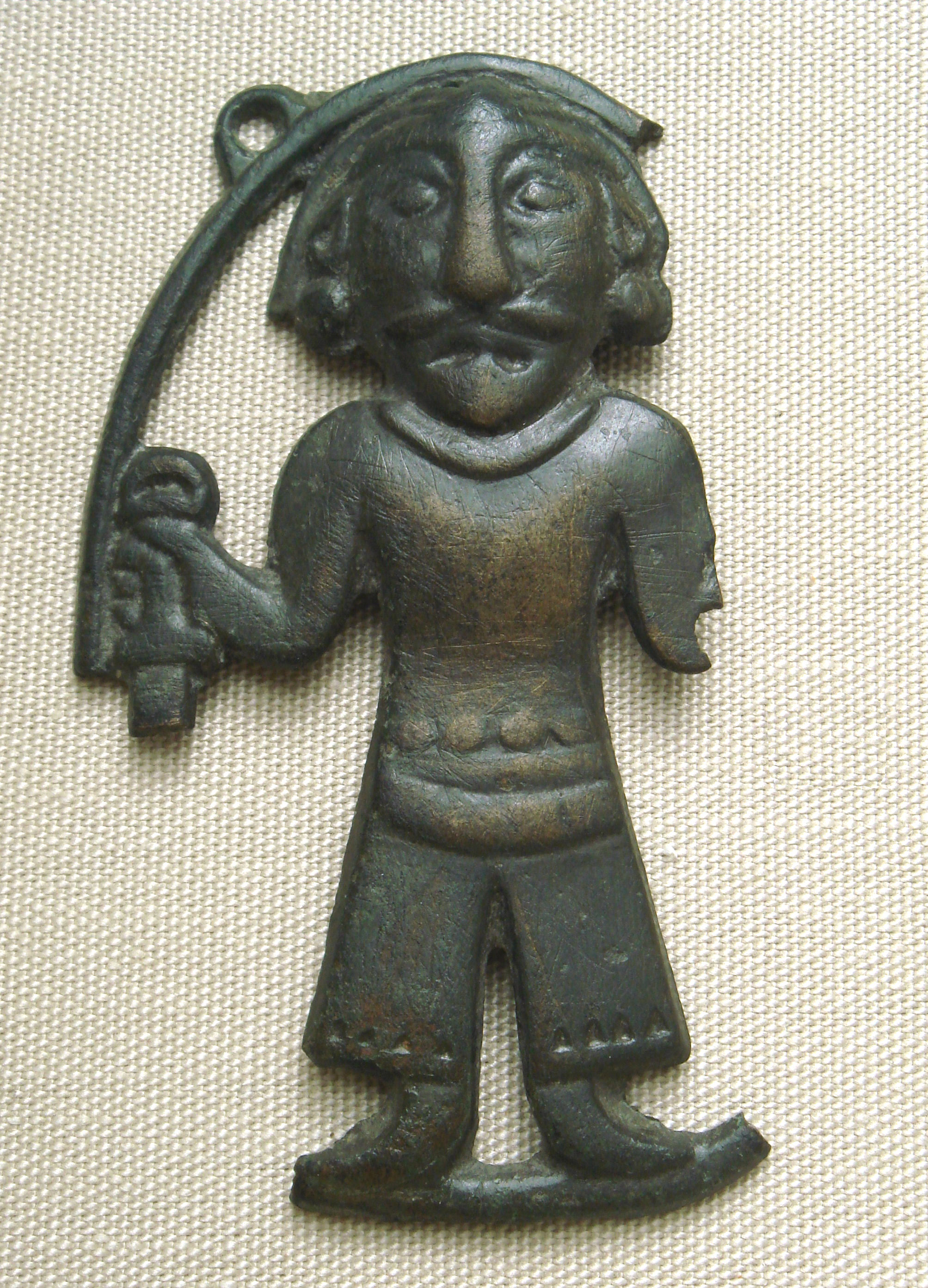
Bronze statuette of a man, Ordos, 3-1st century BC. British Museum. Otto J. Maenchen-Helfen notes that the statuette displays clear Europoid features.

The Ordos are mainly known from their skeletal remains and artifacts. The Ordos culture of about 500 BC to AD 100 is known for its "Ordos bronzes", blade weapons, finials for tent-poles, horse gear, and small plaques and fittings for clothes and horse harness, using animal style decoration with relationships both with the Scythian art of regions much further west, and also Chinese art. Its relationship with the Xiongnu is controversial; for some scholars they are the same, and for others different. Many buried metal artefacts have emerged on the surface of the land as a result of the progressive desertification of the region. According to Iaroslav Lebedynsky, they are thought to be the easternmost people of Scythian affinity to have settled here, just to the east of the better-known Yuezhi. Because the people represented in archaeological finds tend to display Europoid features, also earlier noted by Otto J. Maenchen-Helfen, Lededynsky suggests the Ordos to be of Scythian affinity. The weapons, found in tombs throughout the steppes of the Ordos, are very close to those of the Scythians, known on the Asian Steppe as Sakas.

The Ordos were in contact and often at war with the pre-Han and Han populations of the period. Their former territory is now located just north of the Great Wall of China, and on the south bank of the northernmost hook of the Yellow River. The western neighbours of Ordos may have been identical with the Yuezhi who, after being vanquished by the Xiongnu, migrated to southern Asia to form the Kushan Empire. They were also culturally related to another nomadic tribe to the east, the Eastern Hu (東胡; Donghu), who shared a similar "art of the steppes," but appear to have been Mongoloids. They may also have been related to the Di people of Chinese annals.

In Chinese accounts, the Xiongnu first appear at Ordos in the Yizhoushu and Shanhaijing during the Warring States period before it was occupied by Qin and Zhao. It is generally thought to be their homeland, however when exactly they came to occupy the region is unclear, and it might have been much earlier than traditionally thought, as suggested by archaeological finds. As the Xiongnu expanded southward into Yuezhi territory around 160 BC under their leader Modun, the Yuezhi in turn defeated the Sakas (Scythians) and pushed them away at the Issyk Kul. It is thought the Xiongnu also occupied the Ordos area during the same period, when they came in direct contact with the Chinese. From there, the Xiongnu conducted numerous devastating raids into Chinese territory (167, 158, 142, 129 BC). The Han dynasty started to fight the Xiongnu in the 2nd century BC under emperor Han Wudi, and colonized the area of the Ordos under Shuofang commandery in 127 BC. Prior to the campaign, there were already commanderies established earlier by Qin and Zhao until they were overrun by the Xiongnu in 209 BC.

== See also ==
- Hetao
- Ordos Block
- Six Frontier Towns
