= History of the western steppe =

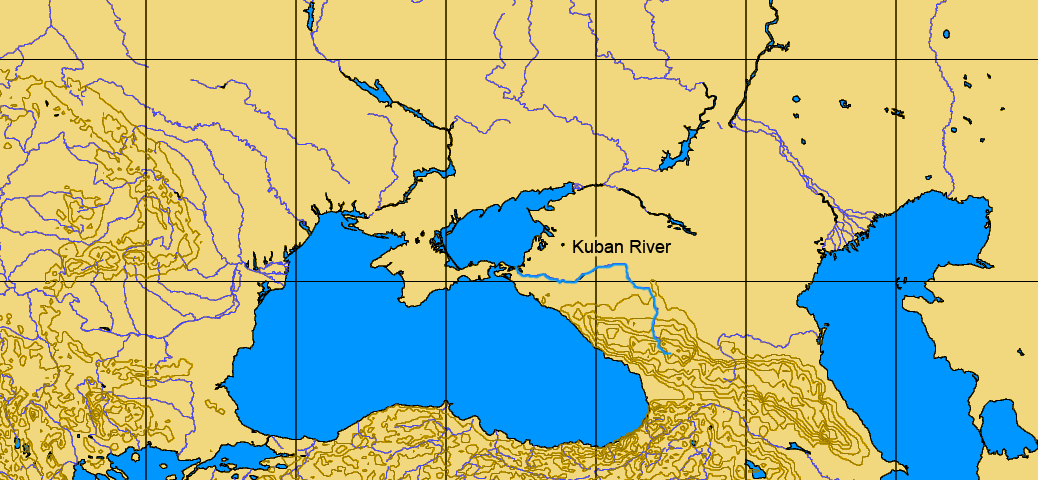
Black Sea region (steppe not marked). South-flowing rivers are the Dnieper, Don and Volga.

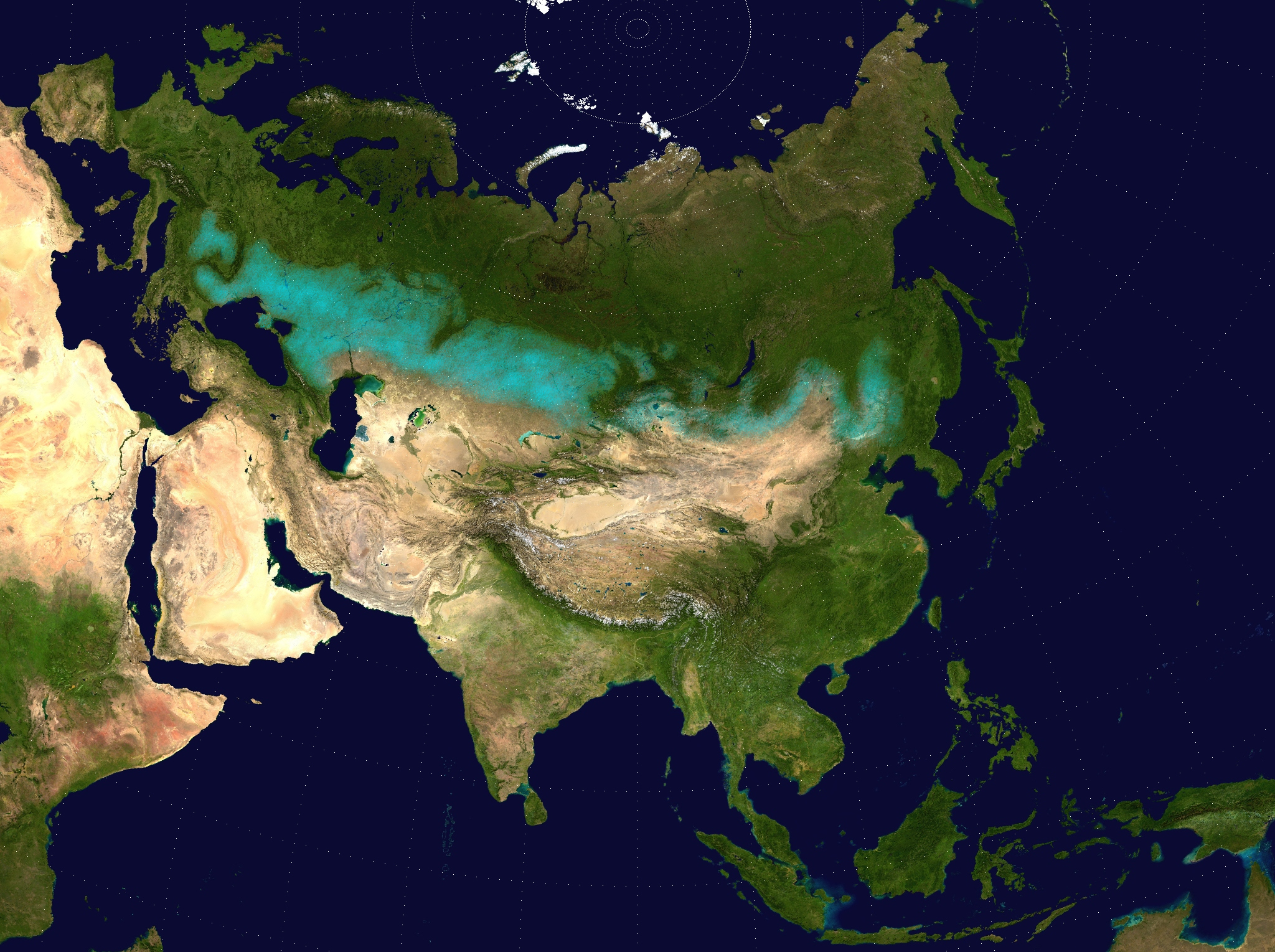
The Eurasian Steppe Belt (in ) The marking includes a good bit of forest-steppe. In the far west note the Carpathian Mountains separating the Hungarian plain from the main steppe.

The history of the western steppe concerns the western part of the Eurasian Steppe, including the grasslands of Ukraine and southern Russia.

== Geography ==
The area is approximately triangular. The line between forest and steppe began near the mouth of the Danube on the Black Sea and ran northeast toward Kazan and then turned south along the western side of the Ural Mountains. This was not a sharp line but rather a broad band of often deciduous forest-steppe. Its nature and location is hard to establish since most of it has now been cleared for agriculture. The southern boundary runs northeast and then east-southeast along the shore of the Black Sea, continues in the same direction along the north side of the Caucasus Mountains, meets the Caspian Sea and follows its western shore north. Between the north end of the Caspian to the Urals is open grassland that connects the area to the central steppe. The Sea of Azov projects northeast, turning the Black Sea-Caspian Steppe into a kind of peninsula. The western part is sometimes called the Kuban region from the Kuban River that drains the Caucasus northwest. The Crimean peninsula extends into the Black Sea and was a link from the steppe to the Byzantine and Turkish empires. In the far west, the Hungarian plain is an island of grassland separated from the main steppe by the mountains of Transylvania. Most of the area is suitable for agriculture except for the semi-desert west and north of the Caspian. North-south trade routes were along the Volga River and Dnieper River. Between them the Don River was a minor route.

== General observations ==
For unknown reasons, almost all movements on the steppe have been from east to west. For unknown reasons, from about 500 AD the original Iranian languages were replaced by Turkic languages. Unlike the central and eastern steppe, the western steppe has now been converted to agriculture. Steppe history must be reconstructed from scattered reports from neighboring literate societies, with some help from archeology. The numerous peoples mentioned were usually some clan or tribe that gained control over its neighbors and became politically significant. A few may have been ethnically homogenous and a few movements may have been genuine folk migrations. In most cases, the matter remains unsolved. Boundaries fluctuated and are not well-documented.

== Before recorded history ==
According to the most commonly held theory, the Indo-European languages originated on the western steppe. Before perhaps 1000 BC speakers of Iranian languages (a sub-set of the Indo-European languages) lived throughout the western and central steppe. The origin of steppe pastoral nomadism is poorly understood. Horse-borne raiding is first reported with the Cimmerians about 700 BC.

Archeologists have identified a Tripolye culture (c. 4000 BC) at the western edge of the steppe, a Sredny Stog culture at about the same time on the Dnieper, a possibly Indo-European Yamnaya culture (c. 3000 BC), a Srubna culture (c. 1500 BC) linked eastward to the possibly Indo-Iranian Andronovo culture, and others.

== Iranian period (c. 700 BC – 450 AD) ==
Greek colonies on the Black Sea

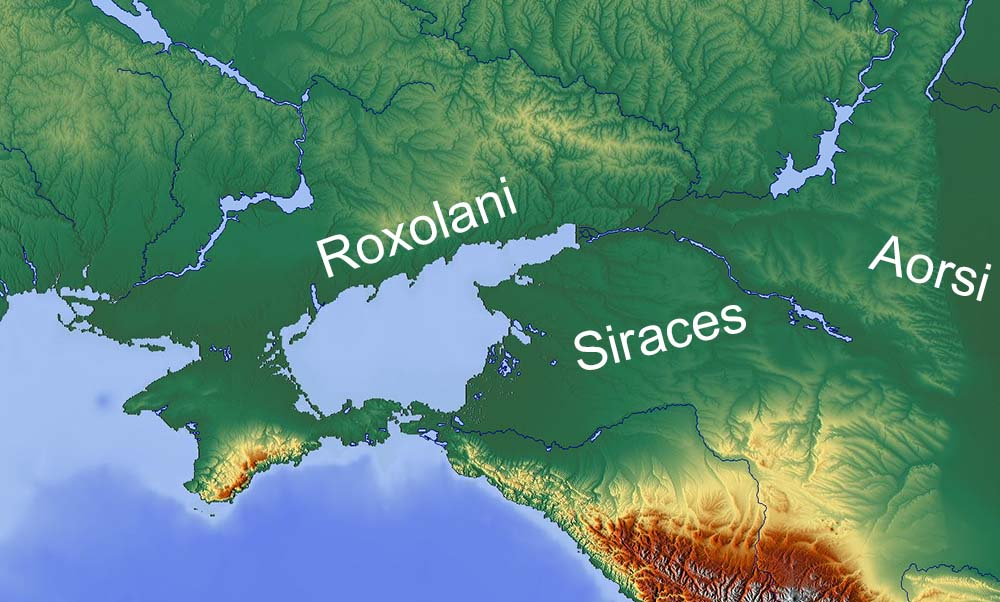
Approximate locations of three Sarmatian tribes

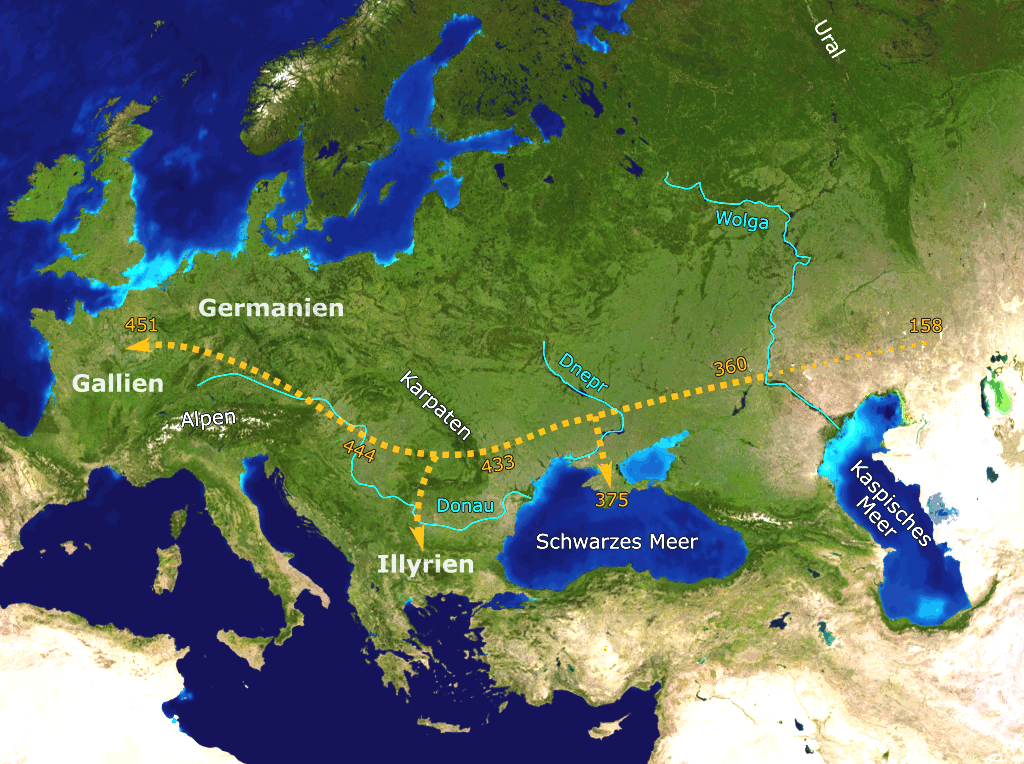
A suggested path of Hunnic movement westwards

- Scythians broadly (c. 700 BC – ???): The Greeks called most of the people north of the Black Sea "Scythians". The Persians called the people of the central steppe Sakas, the two words meaning about the same thing. Both spoke Iranian languages.
- Greeks (c. 650 BC – 370 AD): From the seventh century BC the Greeks founded colonies around the Black Sea. They exported grain and slaves to Byzantium and beyond – a pattern that continued in various forms until the eighteenth century AD. Many became organized as the Bosporian Kingdom which was later a Roman client.
- The Maeotians lived around the Sea of Azov and practiced some agriculture. It is not clear whether the term is ethnic, political or merely geographic.
- Cimerians (c. 700 BC): According to Herotodus, writing 250 years later, the Scythians drove the Cimerians across the Caucasus where they lived by raiding. The Scythians pursued and defeated them and ruled south of the Caucasus for 28 years before returning north. Assyrian texts report Gimirri (c. 714 BC) and Ishkuzai (Scythians? c. 679 BC) fighting to their north.
- The Scythians proper (c. 650–300 BC) may have started in the Kuban region around 650 BC and moved northwest about 550. About 513 Darius I invaded Scythia, could not catch the Scythians and withdrew. The "Royal Scythians" ruled the "nomad Scythians" and groups of "farmer Scythians" who probably sold grain to the Greek cities. After their defeat remnant Scythians had a kingdom in the Crimea (c. 170 BC-62 AD).
- Sarmatians (c. 300 BC – 375 AD): The Sarmatians took over from the Scythians and ruled the steppe until they were defeated by the Huns. They originally lived east of the Scythians, separated by the Don. Their language was close to Scythian. They used heavy cavalry as opposed to the Scythian's light cavalry and seem to have had female warriors which gave rise to Greek stories of the Amazons.
  - The Sarmatians had a number of subdivisions with distinct histories, the most important being the Alans. Many were involved in the break-up of the Roman Empire. Sauromatae was either an older name for the Sarmatians or an earlier phase of that people. The Iazyges were the westernmost Sarmatians. They moved west and ended up in Hungary. The Roxolani started between the Don and Dnieper, followed the Iazyges west and fought the Romans. The Siraces lived east of the Sea of Azov and interacted with the Greek colonies. The Aorsi lived along the Don between today's Rostov and Volgograd and were fairly powerful. The Alans seem to have originated on the Syr Darya River where they were noticed by the Chinese. They moved west, absorbed the Aorsi, continued west, joined the Germanic tribes attacking the Roman Empire and ended up in France, Spain and North Africa. Remnant Alans sought refuge in the Caucasus and became the modern Ossetians. The Saii lived around the Dnieper bend and were not very important. The ill-documented Royal Sarmatians lived north of the Saii.
- Goths (c. 250–375 AD): The Ostrogoths crossed what is now Poland and occupied the western half of the western Steppe. After their defeat a few Goths continued to live in Crimea.
- Huns (c. 350–454 AD): The non-European Huns arose somewhere in central Asia, crossed the Volga and Don, absorbed the Alans, drove the Goths into the Roman Empire, raided the Roman Empire and broke up. Fragments of their confederation reappeared under other names.
- c. 450–550: The next hundred years does not appear to be well documented.

== Turkic period (c. 450 – 1775) ==
- Early Turks (c. 450–550): The change from Iranian to Turkic languages does not appear to have changed daily life. After the Turks arrived there are few reports of Iranian remnants, which is hard to explain. The Turkic languages probably originated in the forest-steppe along the northern edge of Mongolia. Many of the early peoples mentioned in the history of the eastern steppe may have been partly Turkic or proto-Turkic. Turkic sub-families reached the west in this order: Oghur (most went north and disappeared), Oghuz (most went southwest to Turkmenistan and Turkey) and Kipchak (remained on the western and central steppe). In the first centuries AD Turkic-speaking groups seem to have crossed the central steppe along with the Huns and others. The possibly Turkic Akatziri (c. 447 AD) fought with the Huns. The Saraguri, who attacked the Akatziri, and Onogurs (both c. 463) were driven west by the Sabirs. The kindred Kutrigurs (west) and Utigurs (east) (both c. 551) were probably Turkic. All of these peoples may have been part of the Hunnic confederation and were absorbed by the Bulgars and Khazars.
- Sabirs (c. 463 – 582): The Turkic Sabirs were driven west by another group, drove the early Turks westward and occupied the Black-Sea-Caspian region. They fought for and against the Greeks and Persians and were absorbed by the Bulgars and Khazars.

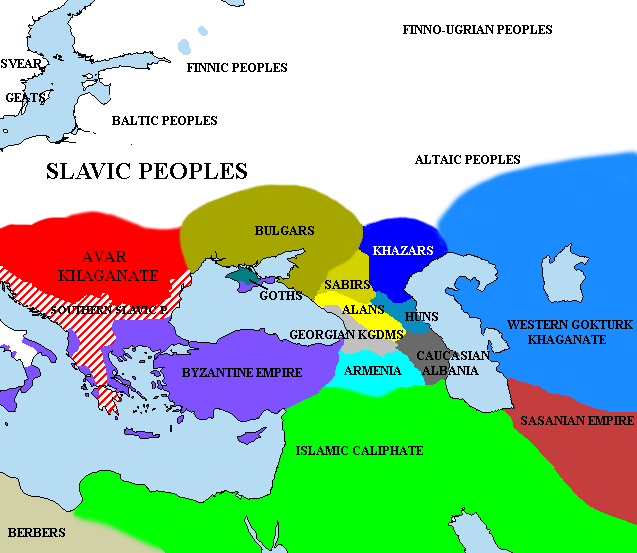
Avars, Bulgars and Khazars 650 AD before the Khazars overthrew the Bulgars. Most sources do not extend the Bulgars this far west

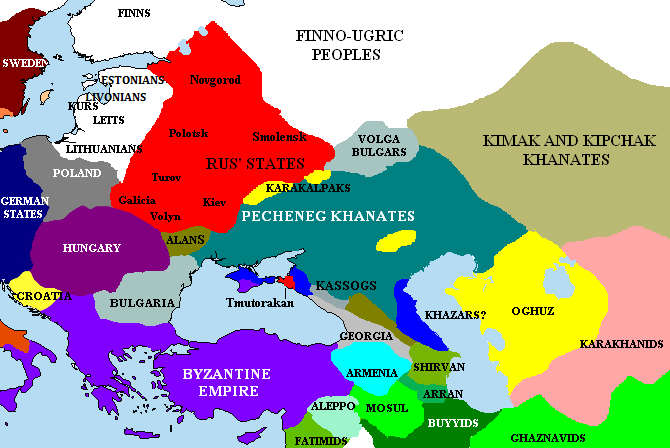
Pechenegs (post-Khazar)

- Avars (c. 557 – 796): The Pannonian Avars may have been partly related the Rouran who were driven out of Mongolia by the Göktürks in 555. They crossed the western steppe, absorbing the early Turks, Sabirs, and Alans, and founded the Avar Khaganate (c. 568 – 796) in Hungary which was conquered by Charlemagne. Based in Hungary, they seem to have lost control of the steppe, the area being taken by the Western Turkic Kaganate which was based in the central steppe.
- Bulgars (c. 632 – 668): The Oghur Turkic Bulgars founded Old Great Bulgaria north of the Sea of Azov which was conquered by the Khazars from the east in 668. In 679 some Bulgars went to the Balkans, adopted the local Slavic language and gave their name to Bulgaria. Another group went up the Volga to near Kazan and founded Volga Bulgaria which adopted Islam in 922 and lasted until the Mongol conquest. The Chuvash people may be a remnant of the Volga Bulgars.
- Hungarians (c. 800–900): The linguistic ancestors of the Uralic-speaking Hungarians or Magyars arose somewhere in the Urals. By c. 800 they had abandoned the forest and become steppe nomads partly subject to the Khazars. Around 900 they conquered Hungary and after 1000 became a Christian European kingdom.
- Khazars (c. 626–960): The Turkic Khazars formed a state around and east of the Sea of Azov, adopted Judaism and were broken up by the Rus' and Pechenegs. Their state was large and fairly well-organized and was a useful ally of Byzantium. Their fall was linked with a shift of the Rus' trade from the Volga to the Pecheneg-controlled Dnieper.
- Alans again (c. 700 – 1239): A group of Alan remnants re-emerged north of the Caucasus (Alania). After their destruction by the Mongols some sought refuge in the mountains and became the Ossets.
- Kievan Rus (c. 862–1240): Vikings subdued and organized the forest tribes north of the steppe, adopted the local Slavic language and founded the state of Kievan Rus. They opened trade routes to Persia and Byzantium, raided both countries, adopted Greek Christianity in 988 and were conquered by the Mongols.
- Pechenegs (c. 800 – 1091). The Pechenegs were Oghuz Turks who were driven west by other Oghuz, reached the Ural-Volga area, moved west of the Khazars, pushed the Magyars into Hungary, fought all their neighbors and were destroyed by the Cumans and Byzantines in 1091.
  - Chorni Klobuky (c. 1000 – 1240) were semi-settled Pechenegs (mostly) of the forest-steppe who interacted with the Rus'. The Torks or Torkils were a sub-group.
  - Oghuz in general: Oghuz was one of the main branches of the Turkic languages. It is not certain that they had anything in common other than their language family. The Oghuz Pechenegs entered the western steppe and broke up. The main body went southwest to Turkmenistan, became the Seljuks and Ottomans and established their language in Turkey.
- Cumans (c. 1000 – 1241): The Cumans (called Polovtsi by the Russians) were the western branch of the Kipchak Turks who extended far into the central steppe. The Kipchaks were independent tribes with no state or even confederation. They appeared on the western steppe circa 1000, reached the Danube area around 1070 and ruled the steppe until they were conquered by the Mongols in 1241. Some remnants fled to Hungary and were Magyarized, but retained a certain legal status until 1876. Their Kipchak language group remained the steppe language for about 800 years until it was replaced by Russian.
- Mongols (c. 1222–1260): About 1223 the Mongols made a devastating raid into the western steppe and Russia. In 1236–1240 they conquered both places.
- Golden Horde (c. 1260–1500): The Mongol Empire split into four parts, the western part becoming the Golden Horde. The rulers adopted the Kipchak language of their subjects and at some point became Muslims. From its language, it was also known as the Kipchak Khanate.
- Baskkirs (c. 840–): The Bashkirs are Kipchak-speakers who live roughly between the Volga and Urals. Their presence is connected with the Volga trade route.
- Byzantines: The Byzantine Empire interacted with the steppe peoples mainly when the steppe peoples invaded the Balkans, something that is too complex to be summarized here. They sometimes used the steppe peoples to attack the Persians. After they were replaced by the Ottomans in 1453 there were few invasions from the steppe.
- Nogais (c. 1500 – 1775): When the Golden Horde broke up the steppe peoples became the Nogai Horde.
- Kalmyks (c. 1630 – 1771): The Kalmyks were Buddhist Mongols. They crossed the central steppe from Dzungaria and settled on the north shore of the Caspian. In 1771 the majority returned to Dzungaria, leaving a remnant west of the Caspian.

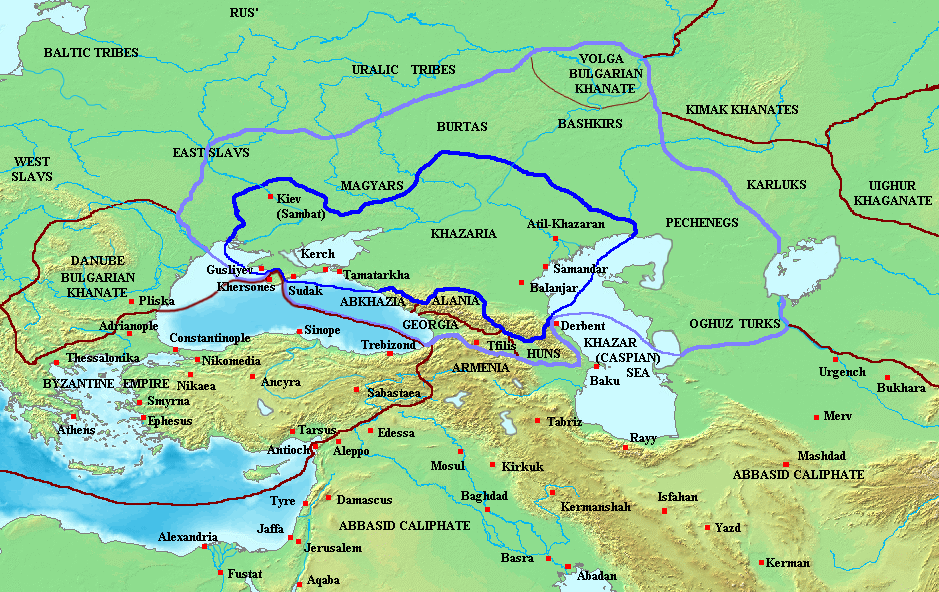
c. 800: Khazars and outlying subjects

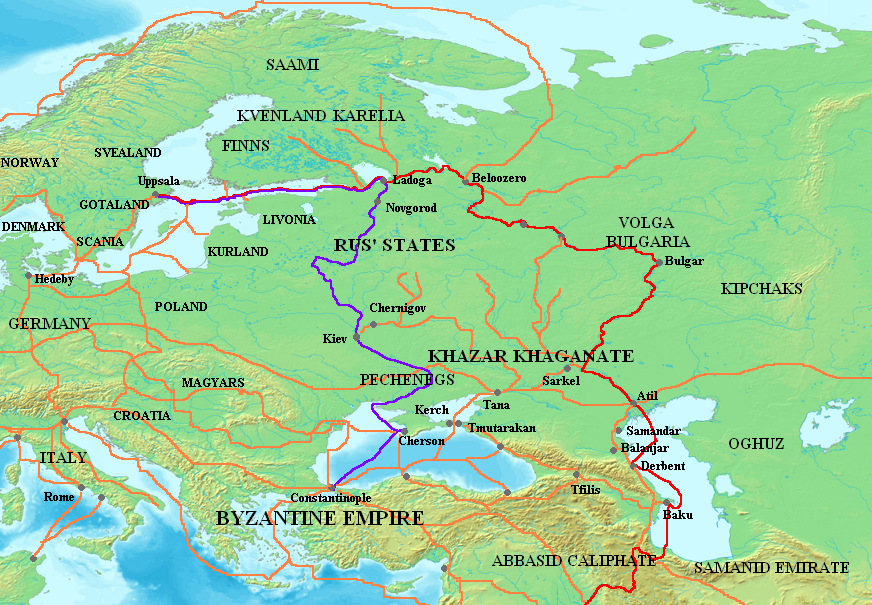
c. 900: Kievan Rus and trade routes

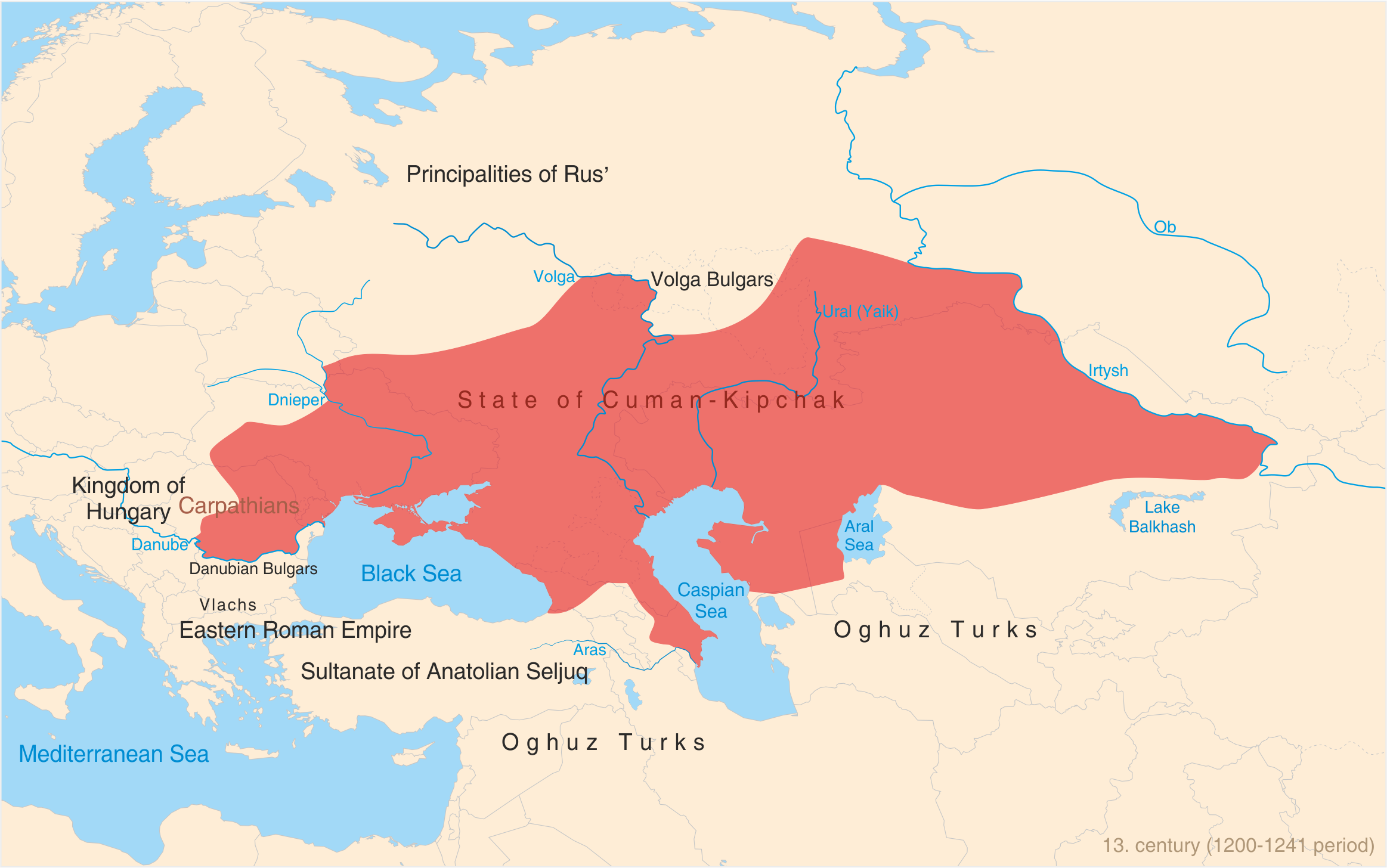
c. 1200: Kipchaks (Cumans)

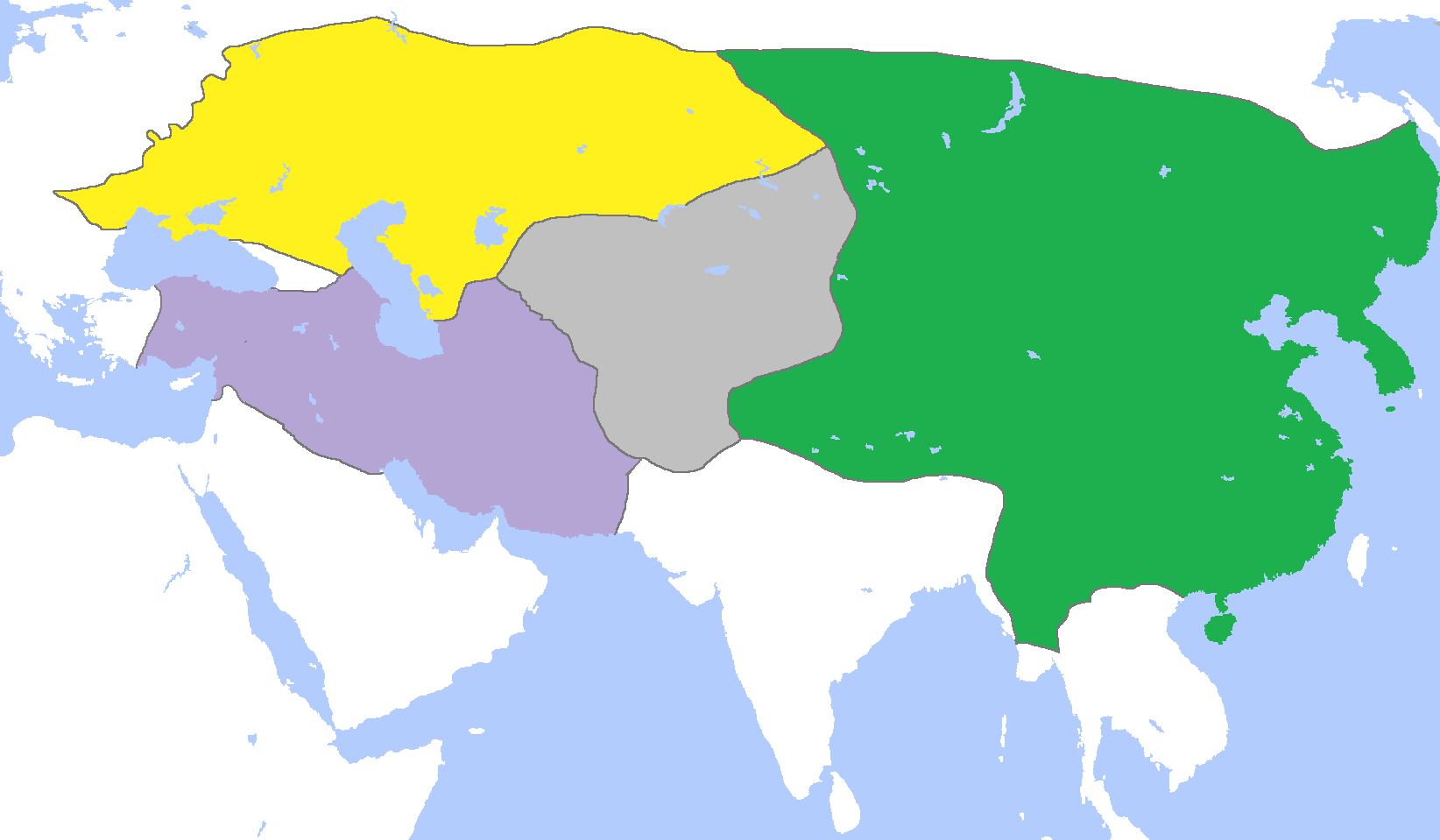
c. 1300: The Mongol Empire split into four parts

== The plow conquers the steppe (c. 1500 – 1900) ==
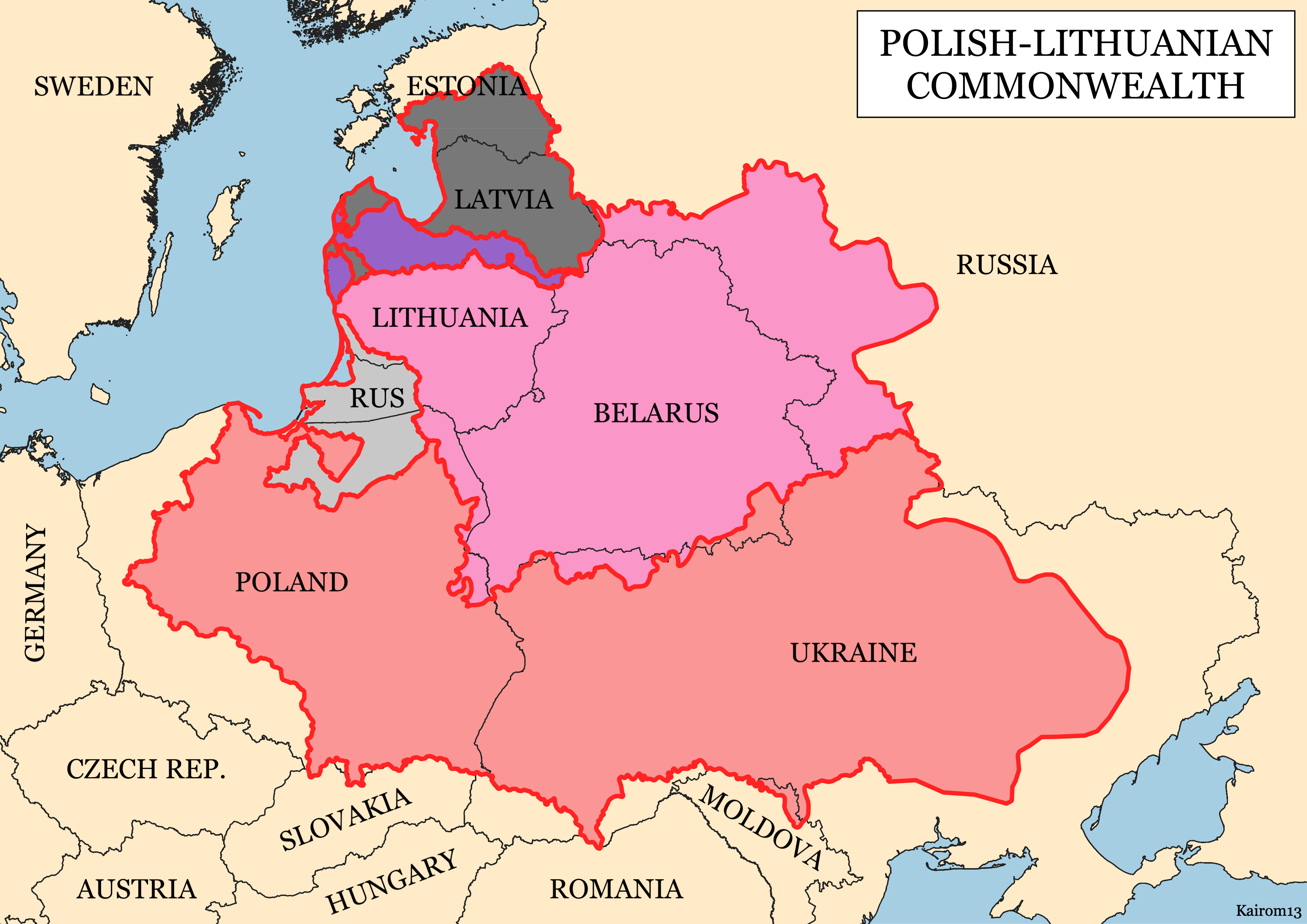
c. 1600: Polish–Lithuanian commonwealth at its maximum extent

Parts of the Golden Horde broke off as follows: 1438: Khanate of Kazan on the upper Volga, 1449: Khanate of Crimea on the Black Sea, 1466: Astrakhan Khanate on the lower Volga. Russia regained its independence around 1480. The Golden Horde was abolished and the steppe peoples became the Nogai Horde. Those north of Crimea were nominally subject to the Crimean Khan who in turn was a vassal or ally of the Ottoman Empire.

By the Mongol period, the forest and forest-steppe south of the Oka River was largely depopulated. The area was kept clear of peasants by Nogai slave raids which extended as far northwest as Belarus. The captives were sold through Crimea to the Ottoman Empire. From around 1525, Russia began expanding south, filling the area with tax-paying peasants, until it annexed Crimea in 1783. In the same period peasant agriculture expanded east from the Polish–Lithuanian Commonwealth. During the Khmelnitsky Uprising (1648) Polish power on the steppe was broken. When things settled down the steppe was partitioned between Russia and Poland along the Dnieper. The Polish steppe was annexed by Russia in 1772–1795. Some areas in the southwest were taken from Turkey. In the nineteenth century, the steppe between the Caspian and Black Sea was colonized. By 1900 steppe nomadism had almost completely disappeared in the western steppe, although it continued further east.

== See also ==
- History of the central steppe
- History of the eastern steppe
- Bibliography of Ukrainian history
