= Linhe District =

Linhe District 临河区 • ᠯᠢᠨ ᠾᠧ ᠲᠣᠭᠣᠷᠢᠭ Linho
- District
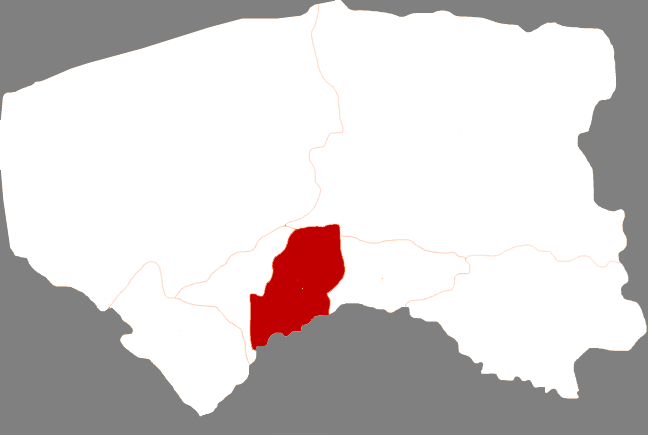
- Linhe in Bayannur

- Location in Inner Mongolia Linhe (China)
- Coordinates (Linhe District government): 40°45′04″N 107°21′50″E
- Country: China
- Autonomous region: Inner Mongolia
- Prefecture-level city: Bayannur
- District seat: Xinhua Subdistrict

Area
  - District: 2,333 km^{2} (901 sq mi)

Population (2020)
  - District: 582,206
  - Density: 249.6/km^{2} (646.3/sq mi)
  - Urban: 385,800
  - Rural: 169,200
- Time zone: UTC+8 (China Standard)
- Website: www.linhe.gov.cn

Linhe District

Chinese name
- Simplified Chinese: 临河区
- Traditional Chinese: 臨河區
Transcriptions
Standard Mandarin
- Hanyu Pinyin: Línhé Qū

Mongolian name
- Mongolian Cyrillic: Линьхө дүүрэг
- Mongolian script: ᠯᠢᠨ ᠾᠧ ᠲᠣᠭᠣᠷᠢᠭ
Transcriptions
- SASM/GNC: Linhė toɣoriɣ

Linhe (Mongolian: ᠯᠢᠨ ᠾᠧ ᠲᠣᠭᠣᠷᠢᠭ; Chinese: 临河区) is the only district and the seat of the city of Baynnur, Inner Mongolia, situated at the northern loop of the Yellow River, south of the Lang Shan range (70 km or 43 mi south-east of the Huhebashige). The district spans an area of 2,333 square kilometers, and has a population of 555,000 inhabitants as of 2019.

== History ==
The area of present-day Linhe was first incorporated under Emperor Wu of the Han dynasty in 127 BCE, and appears by name in Volume 28 of the Book of Han.

The area remained sparsely inhabited before the late Ming dynasty, when an exodus of people from fleeing famine in other provinces, such as Shanxi, Shaanxi, and Shandong, established new agricultural ventures in Linhe.

Linhe County was established in 1925.

The county was taken by Communist forces on September 19, 1949.

Linhe was upgraded to a county-level city on November 22, 1984.

On August 26, 2004, Linhe was changed from a county-level city to a district.

== Climate ==
On average, the district receives 3,254 hours of sunlight annually, has an annual temperature of 6.8 °C, and experiences 140 frost-free days per year.

== Administrative divisions ==
Linhe District is divided into 11 subdistricts, 7 towns, and 2 townships.

Name	Simplified Chinese	Hanyu Pinyin	Mongolian (Hudum Script)	Mongolian (Cyrillic)	Administrative division code
Subdistricts
Tuanjie Subdistrict	团结街道	Tuánjié Jiēdào	ᠲᠤᠸᠠᠨ ᠵᠢᠶᠧ ᠵᠡᠭᠡᠯᠢ ᠭᠤᠳᠤᠮᠵᠢ	Туван жье зээл гудамж	150802001
Chezhan Subdistrict	车站街道	Chēzhàn Jiēdào	ᠲᠡᠷᠭᠡᠨ ᠥᠷᠲᠡᠭᠡᠨ ᠳ᠋ᠠᠬᠢ ᠵᠡᠭᠡᠯᠢ ᠭᠤᠳᠤᠮᠵᠢ	Тэргэн өртөөн даахь зээл гудамж	150802002
Xianfeng Subdistrict	先锋街道	Xiānfēng Jiēdào	ᠰᠢᠶᠠᠨ ᠹᠧᠩ ᠵᠡᠭᠡᠯᠢ ᠭᠤᠳᠤᠮᠵᠢ	Шиан фен зээл гудамж	150802003
Jiefang Subdistrict	解放街道	Jiěfàng Jiēdào	ᠵᠢᠶᠧ ᠹᠠᠩ ᠵᠡᠭᠡᠯᠢ ᠭᠤᠳᠤᠮᠵᠢ	Жье фан зээл гудамж	150802004
Xinhua Subdistrict	新华街道	Xīnhuá Jiēdào	ᠰᠢᠨᠬᠤᠸᠠ ᠵᠡᠭᠡᠯᠢ ᠭᠤᠳᠤᠮᠵᠢ	Шэнхуа зээл гудамж	150802005
Donghuan Subdistrict	东环街道	Dōnghuán Jiēdào	ᠵᠡᠭᠦᠨ ᠲᠣᠭᠣᠷᠢᠯᠲᠠ ᠵᠡᠭᠡᠯᠢ ᠭᠤᠳᠤᠮᠵᠢ	Зүүн тойролт зээл гудамж	150802006
Tienan Subdistrict	铁南街道	Tiěnán Jiēdào	ᠲᠡᠮᠦᠷ ᠵᠠᠮ ᠤᠨ ᠡᠮᠦᠨᠡᠬᠢ ᠵᠡᠭᠡᠯᠢ ᠭᠤᠳᠤᠮᠵᠢ	Дамар замын өмнөх зээл гудамж	150802007
Xihuan Subdistrict	西环街道	Xīhuán Jiēdào	ᠪᠠᠷᠠᠭᠤᠨ ᠲᠣᠭᠣᠷᠢᠭ ᠵᠡᠭᠡᠯᠢ ᠭᠤᠳᠤᠮᠵᠢ	Баруун дугараг зээл гудамж	150802008
Beihuan Subdistrict	北环街道	Běihuán Jiēdào	ᠬᠣᠢᠲᠤ ᠲᠣᠭᠣᠷᠢᠭ ᠤᠨ ᠵᠡᠭᠡᠯᠢ ᠭᠤᠳᠤᠮᠵᠢ	Хойт дугаргийн зээл гудамж	150802009
Jinchuan Subdistrict	金川街道	Jīnchuān Jiēdào	ᠵᠢᠨᠴᠤᠸᠠᠨ ᠵᠡᠭᠡᠯᠢ ᠭᠤᠳᠤᠮᠵᠢ	Жайван зээл гудамж	150802013
Huifeng Subdistrict	汇丰街道	Huìfēng Jiēdào	ᠬᠤᠢ ᠹᠧᠩ ᠵᠡᠭᠡᠯᠢ ᠭᠤᠳᠤᠮᠵᠢ	Хой фен зээл гудамж	150802014
Towns
Langshan Town	狼山镇	Lángshān Zhèn	ᠯᠠᠩᠱᠠᠨ ᠪᠠᠯᠭᠠᠰᠤ	Ланшин балгас	150802100
Xinhua Town	新华镇	Xīnhuá Zhèn	ᠰᠢᠨᠬᠤᠸᠠ ᠪᠠᠯᠭᠠᠰᠤ	Шэнхуа балгас	150802101
Ganjur Süm Town	干召庙镇	Gànzhàomiào Zhèn	ᠭᠠᠨᠵᠤᠤᠷ ᠰᠦᠮ᠎ᠡ ᠪᠠᠯᠭᠠᠰᠤ	Ганжуур сүм балгас	150802102
Ulan Tug Town	乌兰图克镇	Wūlántúkè Zhèn	ᠤᠯᠠᠭᠠᠨ ᠲᠤᠭ ᠪᠠᠯᠭᠠᠰᠤ	Улаан дог балгас	150802103
Shuanghe Town	双河镇	Shuānghé Zhèn	ᠱᠤᠸᠠᠩ ᠾᠧ ᠪᠠᠯᠭᠠᠰᠤ	Сойн ге балгас	150802104
Chengguan Town	城关镇	Chéngguān Zhèn	ᠴᠧᠩ ᠭᠤᠸᠠᠨ ᠪᠠᠯᠭᠠᠰᠤ	Цэн гуан балгас	150802105
Bayan Obo Town	白脑包镇	Báinǎobāo Zhèn	ᠴᠠᠭᠠᠨ᠌ᠣᠪᠣᠭ᠎ᠠ ᠪᠠᠯᠭᠠᠰᠤ	Цгоноовоо балгас	150802106
Townships
Shuguang Township	曙光乡	Shǔguāng Xiāng	ᠱᠤ ᠭᠤᠸᠠᠩ ᠰᠢᠶᠠᠩ	Шуу гуан шиян	150802200
Bayi Township	八一乡	Bāyī Xiāng	ᠪᠠ ᠢ ᠰᠢᠶᠠᠩ	Ба И шиян	150802201

Others:

- Langshan Farm (狼山农场)
- Linhe Farm (临河农场)

== Economy ==
In 2019, the district's GDP was 29.71 billion Yuan, retail sales totaled, 14.51 billion Yuan, disposable income reached 33,757 Yuan for urban residents and 20,249 Yuan for rural residents.

== Transportation ==
Linhe lies at the junction the Baotou–Lanzhou and the Linhe–Ceke Railways.

Major expressways which pass through Linhe district include National Highway 110, the G6 Beijing–Lhasa Expressway, and the G7 Beijing–Ürümqi Expressway.
