= Ordosian culture =

Paleolithic culture of the Ordos plateau

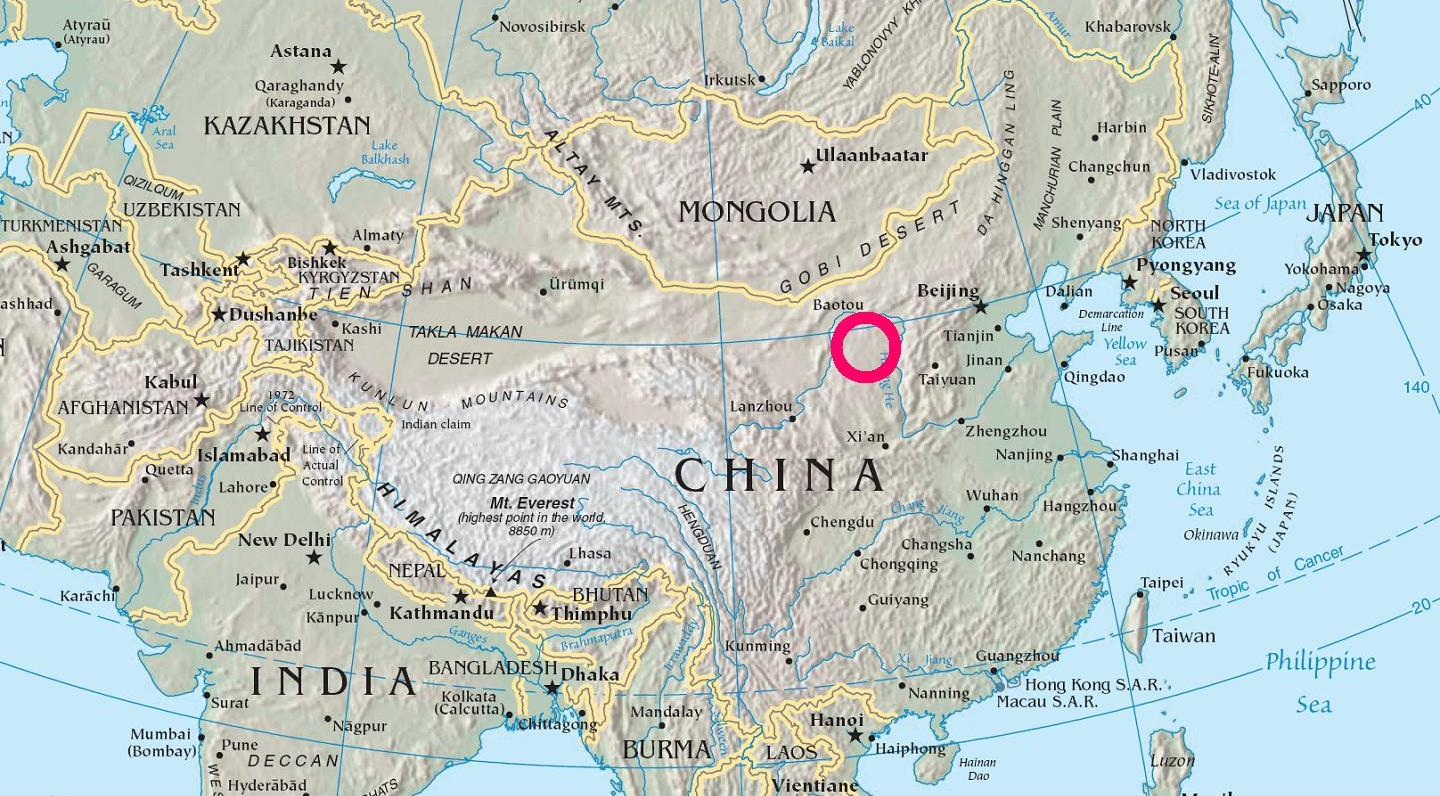
Location of the archaeological finds of the Ordosian culture.

The Ordosian culture, sometimes referred to as the Ordos culture, is a culture documented in the Ordos Plateau, in the south of the Inner Mongolian Autonomous Region of the People's Republic of China, from the Upper Palaeolithic.

The points and sides of their tools indicate a "Moustero-Levalloisian" element. They seemed to have a masterful knowledge of Upper Palaeolithic technology, producing blades as much as fifteen centimeters long.
