= Lüliang Mountains =

Mountain range in central China

Coordinates: 37.8985°N 111.4919°E

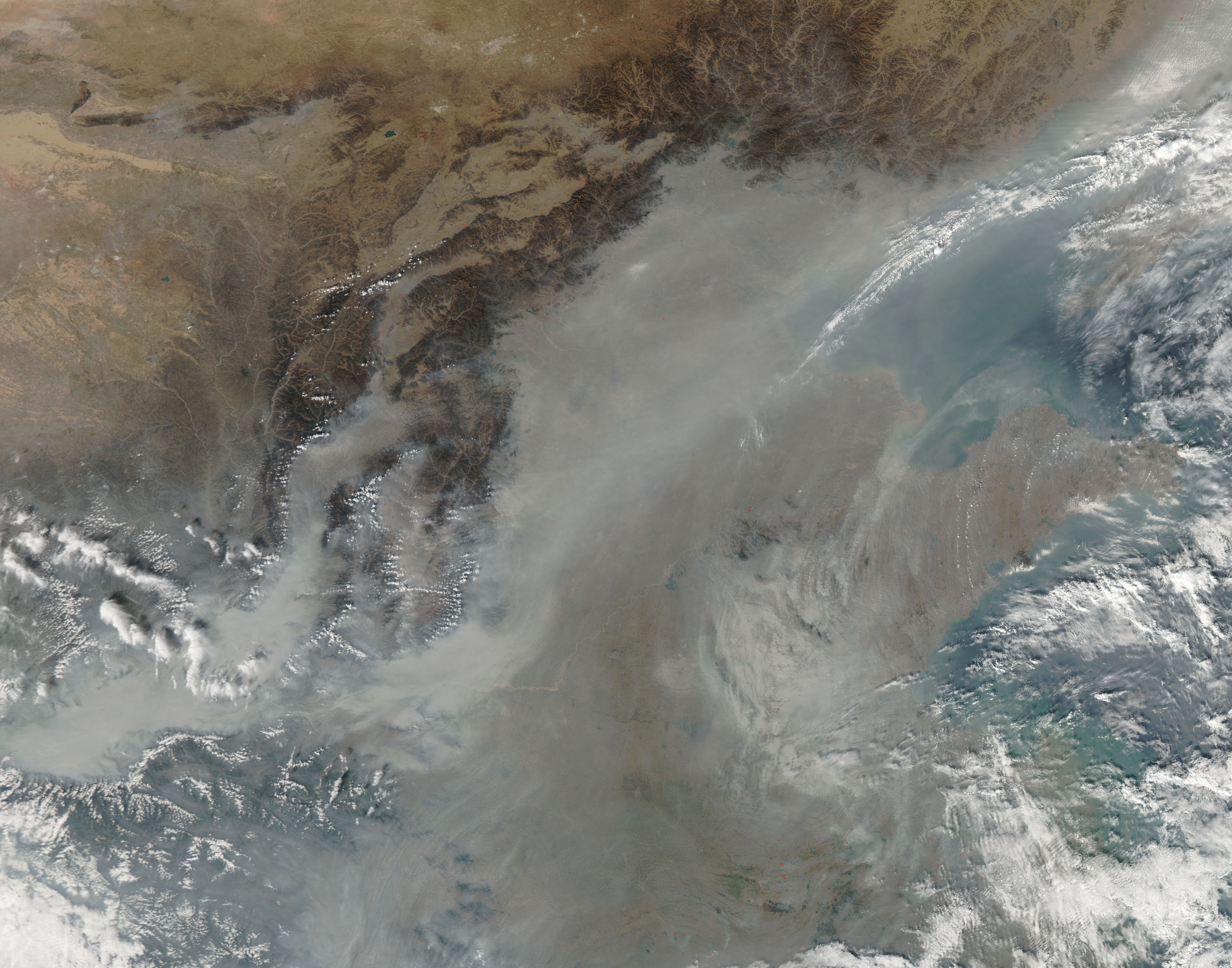
- The Lüliang Mountains in 2009. To its east lie the Fen River valley, the Taihangs, and the North China Plain, here filled with pollution.
- Traditional Chinese: 呂梁山脈
- Simplified Chinese: 吕梁山脉
- Literal meaning: Spiny Ridge Mountain Range
Transcriptions
Standard Mandarin
- Hanyu Pinyin: Lǚliáng Shānmài

The Lüliang Mountains are a mountain range in north central China, dividing Shanxi's Fen River valley from the Yellow River. The range forces the Yellow River southwards on the eastern side of the Ordos Loop but tapers off to the south, where the Fen turns west to join the Yellow River before the Qin Mountains turn the combined river sharply eastward at its confluence with the Wei at Tongguan in Shaanxi.

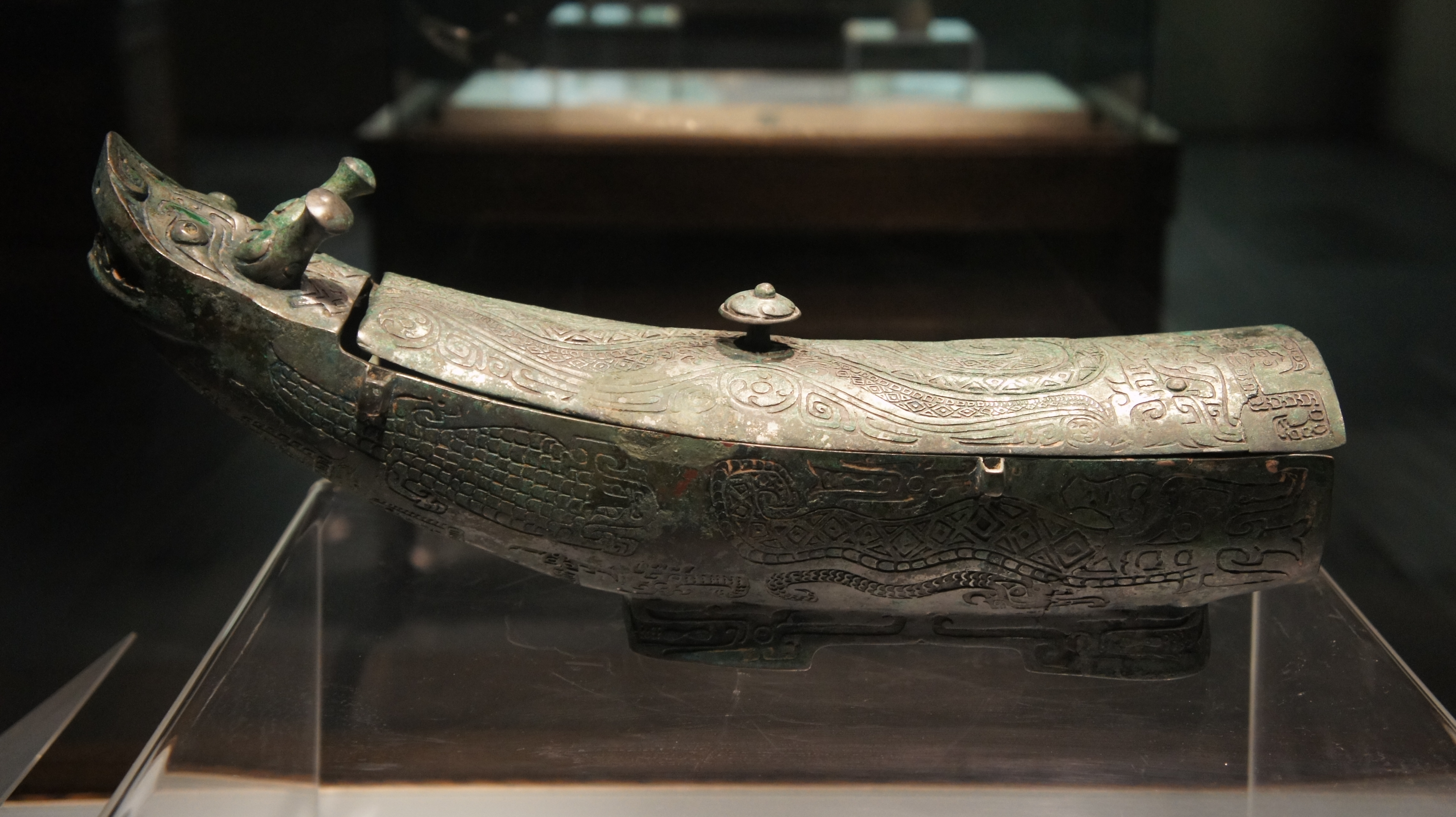
A Shang-era bronze alligator discovered in the Lüliang Range

== See also ==
- Taihang Mountains in eastern Shanxi, dividing the Fen valley from the North China Plain
- Greater Khingan in Manchuria, which runs south form the Taihang and Lüliang
- Tongguan and Hangu Pass, passes between the Lüliang foothills and the Qin Mountains
