= Lang Mountains =

Mountain range in China

- Wolf mountains
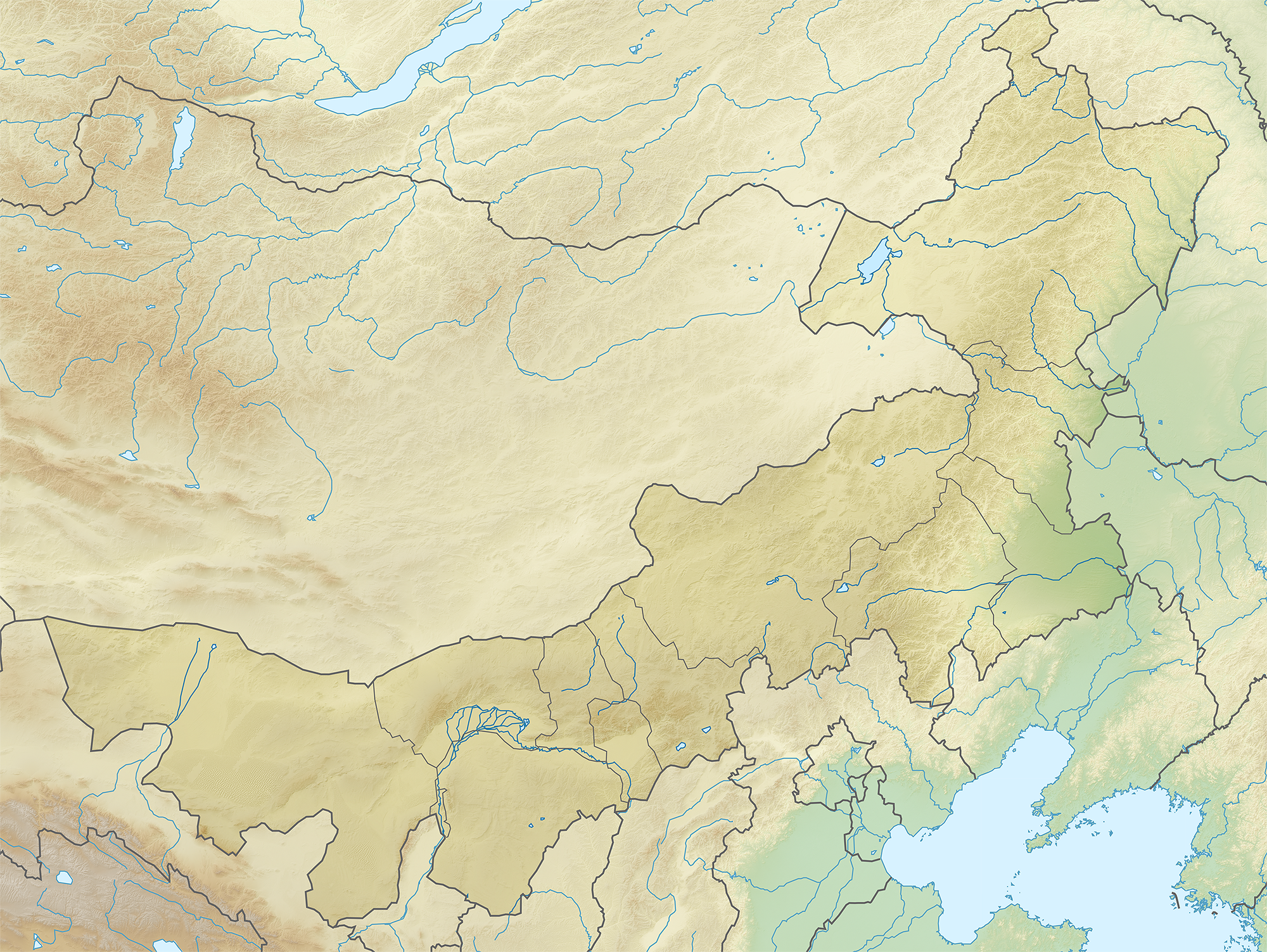
- Location within Inner Mongolia

Highest point
- Coordinates: 41.18°N 106.83°E

Lang Mountains

Chinese name
- Chinese: 狼山
- Literal meaning: Wolf Mountain(s)
Transcriptions
Standard Mandarin
- Hanyu Pinyin: Lángshān
- Wade–Giles: Lang-shan

Mongolian name
- Mongolian Cyrillic: Хара Нарин Ула
Transcriptions
- SASM/GNC: Khara Narin Ula

Langshan, also known as Wolf Mountains or Lang Mountains, is a mountain range at the northwest corner of the Ordos Loop in Inner Mongolia, China. It is sometimes reckoned as part of the Yin Mountains.

== Geography ==
The Wolf Mountains run from southwest to northeast. They force the Yellow River to turn from north to east. To the northwest is the Gobi Desert; to the southeast, between it and the Yellow River, is an irrigated area. Its northeast end continues as the Yin Mountains.

Huhebashige Peak rises to 2,320 meters (7,610 ft) at 41°11′N 106°50′E.
