= Agesiles =

1st-century BC Yuezhi king of Bactria

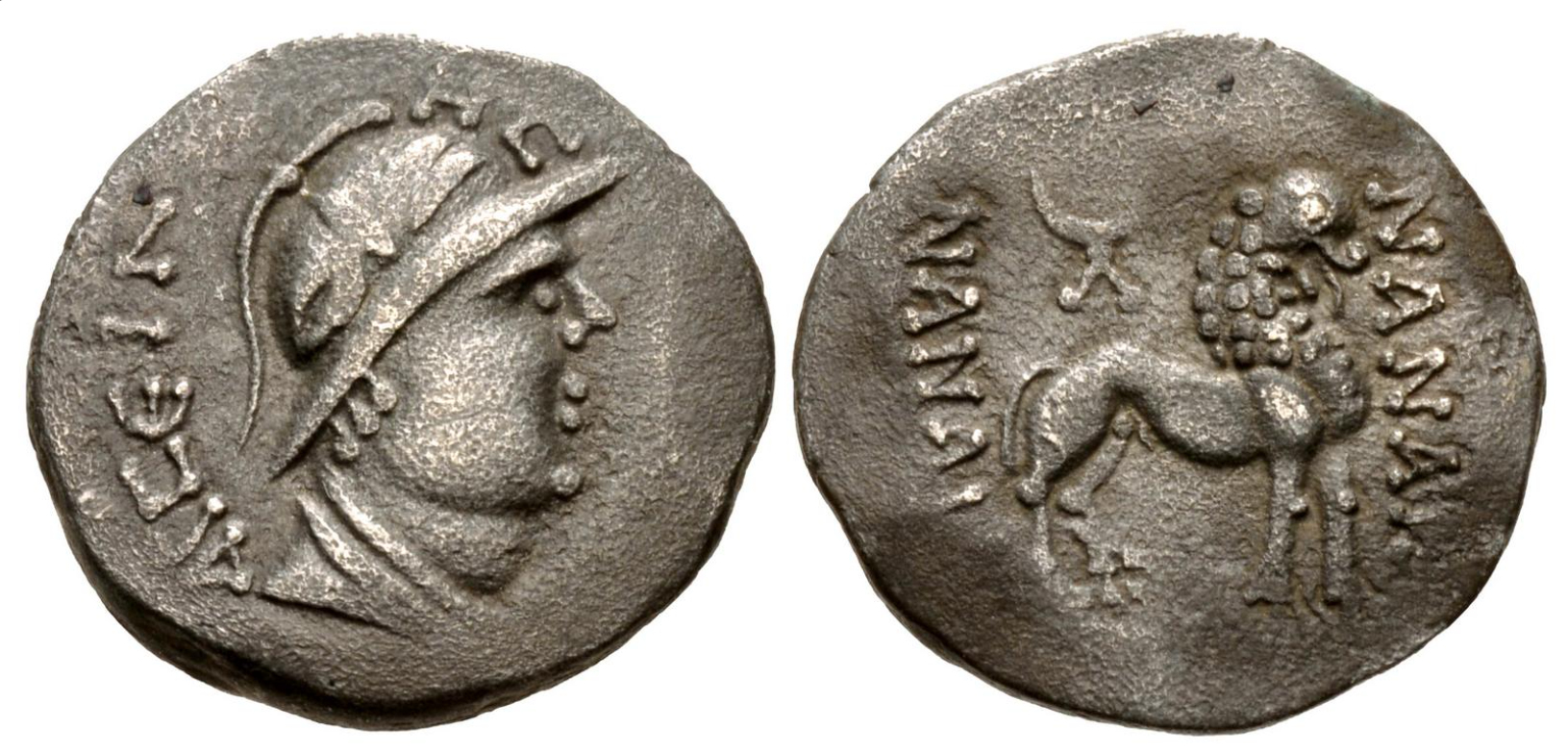
Coin of Yuezhi ruler Agesiles (20-1BC). Greek legend: "ΑΡϹΕΙΛΗϹ" (Arseiles)

Agesiles or Arseiles (Greek: ΑΡϹΕΙΛΗϹ Arseilēs), who reigned around 20BC-1BC, is, with Sapadbizes, one of the first identified kings of the northern Indo-European Yuezhi tribes, that had invaded the Greco-Bactrian kingdom in the region of Bactria (modern-day northern Afghanistan) from around 125 BC. This king is known only from his coins, which are very rare. His name could be derived from the Tocharian word Arsal, "snake" or "viper".
