= Noin-Ula burial site =

Archaeological site in Tov Province, Mongolia

- Noin-Ula burial site
- Location within Continental Asia Location within Mongolia
- 48°23′10.4″N 106°45′17.9″E
- Type: Burial site
- Periods: 1st century BCE-1st century CE
- Location: Batsumber sum of Tov Province

The Noin-Ula burial site (Mongolian: Ноён уулын булш, Noyon uulyn bulsh, also Noyon Uul) consist of more than 200 large burial mounds, approximately square in plan, some 2 m in height, covering timber burial chambers. They are located by the Selenga River in the hills of northern Mongolia north of Ulaanbaatar in Batsumber sum of Tov Province. They were excavated in 1924–1925 by Pyotr Kozlov, who found them to be the tombs of the aristocracy of the Xiongnu; one is an exceptionally rich burial of a historically known ruler of the Xiongnu, Wuzhuliu, who died in 13 CE. Most of the objects from Noin-Ula are now in the Hermitage Museum in Russia, while some artifacts unearthed later by Mongolian archaeologists are on display in the National Museum of Mongolian History, Ulaanbaatar. Four kurgans contained lacquer cups inscribed with Chinese characters believed to be the names of Chinese craftsmen, and dated from 9th year BCE to 2nd year BCE.

== Discovery ==
The Noin-Ula burial site was first discovered in the spring of 1913 by Andrei Ballod, a Russian geologist doing survey work for a new gold-mining company. After discovering a number of already dug mounds, Ballod assumed they were old goldworkings and excavated one, uncovering a number of artifacts. Realizing the importance of his find, he sent some of the artifacts to the Imperial Russian Geological Society. While the find was recognized as significant, nothing was done for eleven years due to the chaos of the First World War and subsequent revolutions in Russia and Mongolia.

In 1924, Pyotr Kozlov was alerted to the find by a member of Ballod's team. After a colleague, Sergei Kondratiev, confirmed that the find was a major discovery, Kozlov changed his plans and eventually excavated eight mounds at the Noin-Ula site.

== Noin-Ula kurgans ==
Noin-Ula and contemporary polities c. 1 CE

As with some finds of the Pazyryk culture, the Noin Ula graves had been flooded and subsequently frozen, thus preserving the organic material to a remarkable degree. The tombs were opened in antiquity and the bodies were removed. This corroborates the Han chronicles which state the leaders of one of the nomad tribes, oppressed by the Xiongnu at the height of their empire, took an unprecedented step 100 years after the decline of the Xiongnu. Wishing to unite their subjects, and driven by a desire for revenge, the new nomadic leaders desecrated the Chanyus' royal tombs. All the burials were unsealed, and the remains of the Chanyus were removed, together with some of their clothing, weaponry and symbols of authority. However, the robbers left Xiongnu weaponry, home utensils, and art objects, and Chinese artifacts of bronze, nephrite, lacquered wood and textiles. Many artifacts show origins along the Great Silk Road and some imported objects and fragments of fabrics are recognized as Greek. The fabric, color, weaving methods and embroidery of the cloth were similar to the fabric produced in the Greek colonies on the Black Sea coast for the Scythians.

Some tombs include horse burials and one tomb had especially lavish furnishings. The coffin was apparently made in China, and the interred person had many of his possessions buried with him. His horse trappings were elaborately decorated and his leather-covered saddle was threaded with black and red wool clipped to resemble velvet. Magnificent textiles included a woven wool rug lined with thin leather with purple, brown, and white felt appliqué work, and textiles of Greco-Bactrian, Parthian or Gandharan origin.

== Wuzhuliu ==
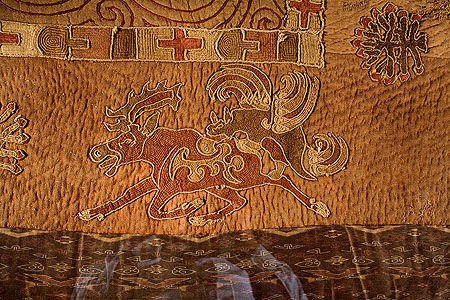
Noin-Ula carpet, animal style. 1st century CE.

Kurgan No 6 was the tomb of Wuzhuliu (烏珠留若提 Wuzhuliuruodi, reigned 8 BCE–13 CE), who is mentioned in the Chinese annals. He is famous for freeing his people from the Chinese protectorate that lasted 56 years, from 47 BCE to 9 CE. Wuzhuliu was buried in 13 CE, a date established from the inscription on a cup given to him by the Chinese Emperor during a reception in the Shanlin park near Chang'an in 1 BCE.

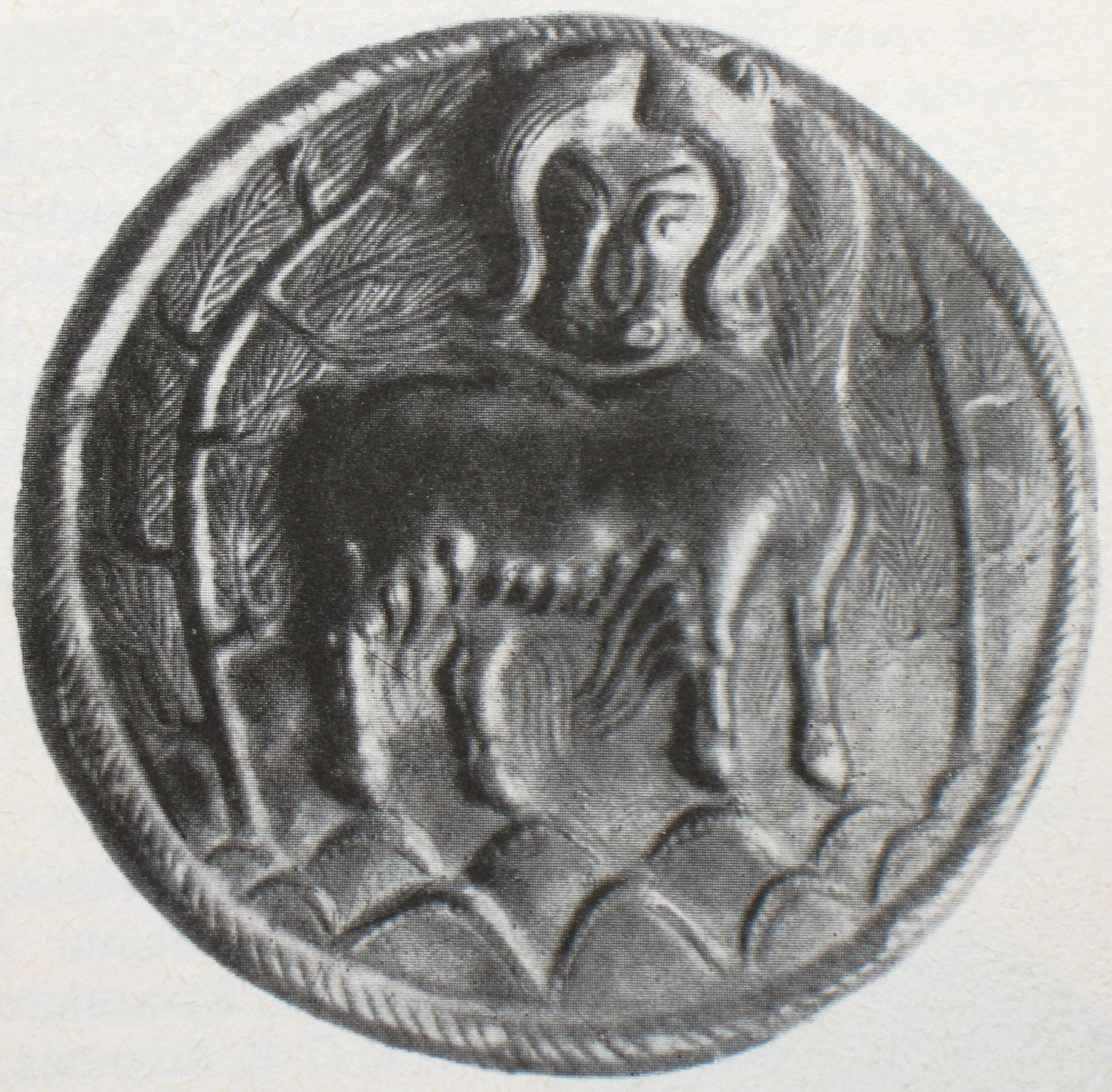
An object from the burial site

The most dramatic objects of Wuzhuliu's funeral inventory are the textiles, of local, Chinese and Bactrian origin. The art objects show that Xiongnu craftsmen used the Scythian "animal" style.

A surviving portrait shows a low nose bridge, eyes with epicanthic fold, long wavy hair, divided in the middle, and a braid visibly tied and falling from the tip of the head over the right ear. Such braids were found in other kurgan tombs in the Noin Ula cemetery; they were braided from horsehair, and kept in special cases. The braid was a part of a formal hairstyle, and the braid resembles the death-masks of the Tashtyk. From these observations, L.N. Gumilev concluded that among the Xiongnu of the 1st century BC, a far-eastern ideal of beauty overcame the traditional western model, which continued in the art of the Scythian "animal" style.

== Embroidered carpets ==
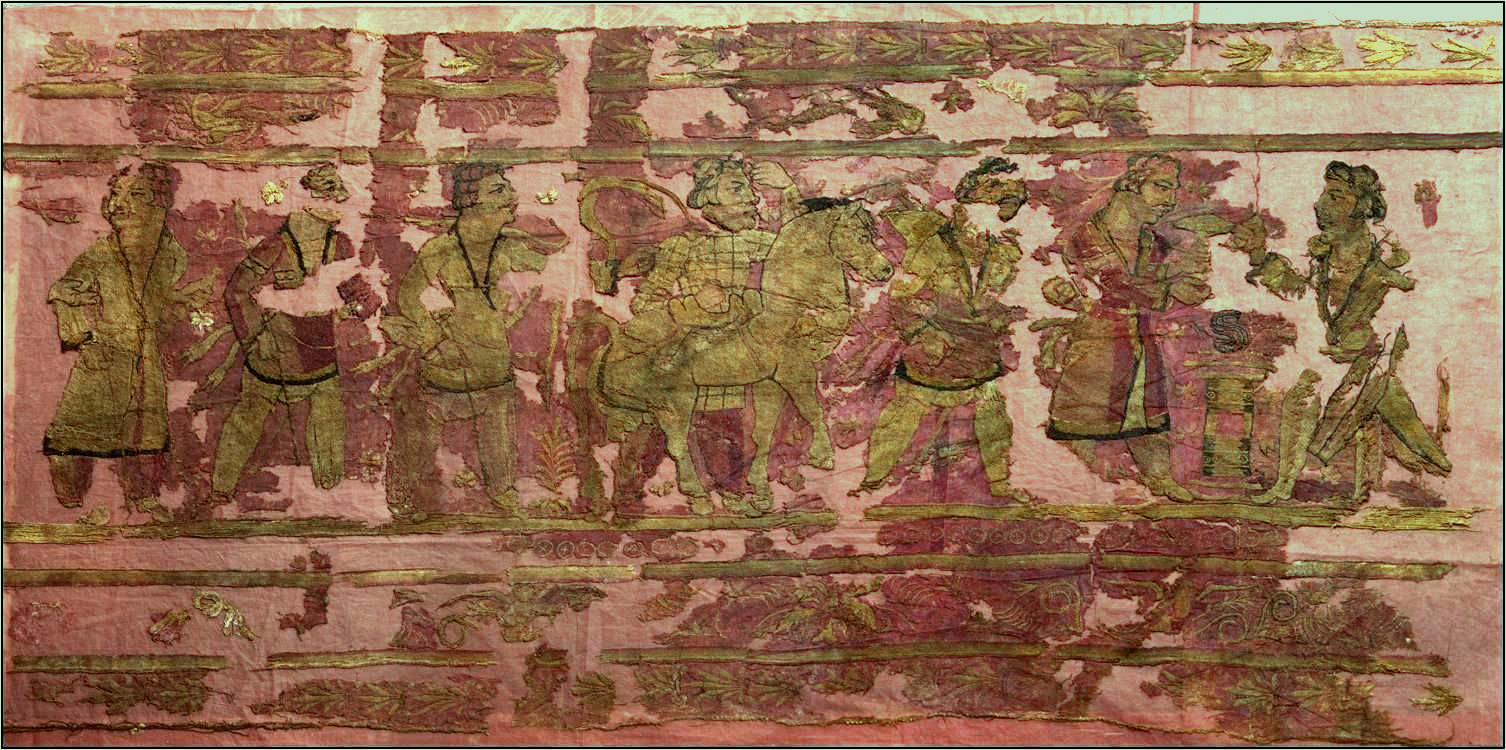
Men in Iranian dress in one of the Noin-Ula embroidered carpets. They have also been proposed to be Yuezhi. 1st century BC - 1st century AD.

Among the most important artifacts from Noin-Ula are embroidered portrait images. The portraits are not made in the Chinese manner, and are the handiwork of a Central Asian or Scythian artist, or perhaps of a Bactrian or Parthian master in the capital of the Chanyus (who had active diplomatic relations with these Central Asian states).

According to Sergey Yatsenko, the carpets were made by the Yuezhi in Bactria, and were obtained by the Xiongnu through commercial exchange or tributary payment, as the Yuezhi may have remained tributaries of the Xiongnu a long time following their defeat. Embroidered carpets were one of the highest prized luxury items for the Xiongnu.

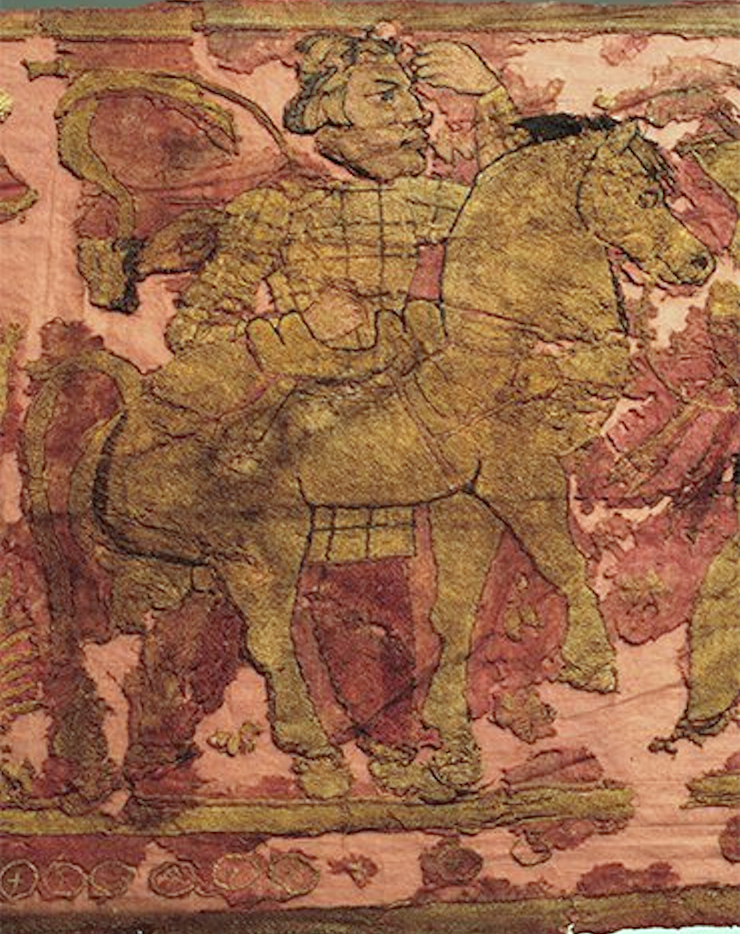
Yuezhi horseman. Noin-Ula carpet.

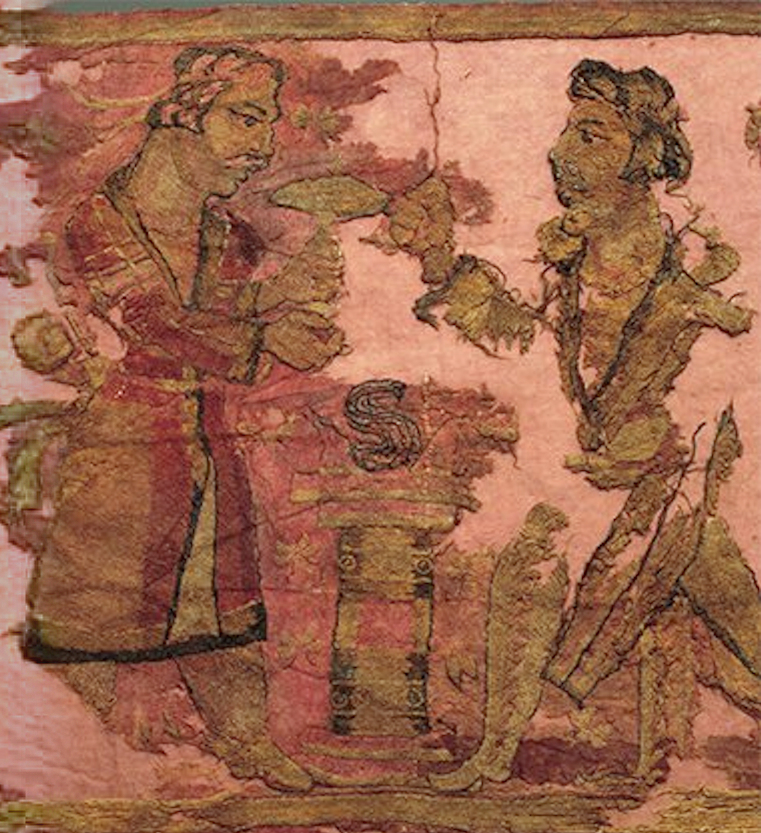
Yuezhi nobleman and priest over fire altar. Noin-Ula carpet.

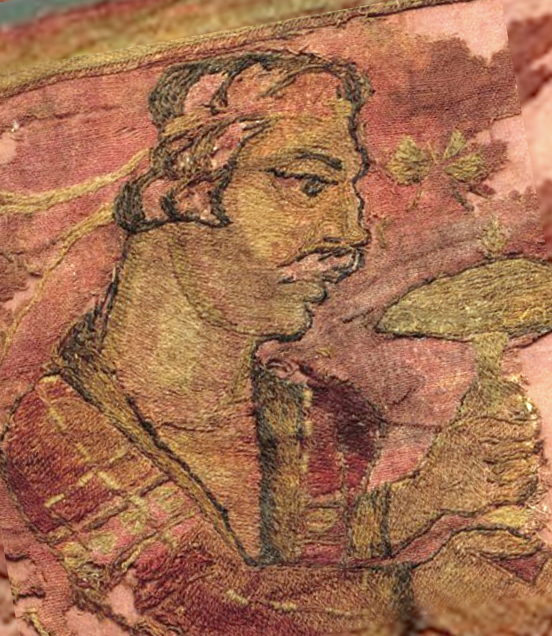
Detail of Yuezhi nobleman presenting mushroom at fire altar.

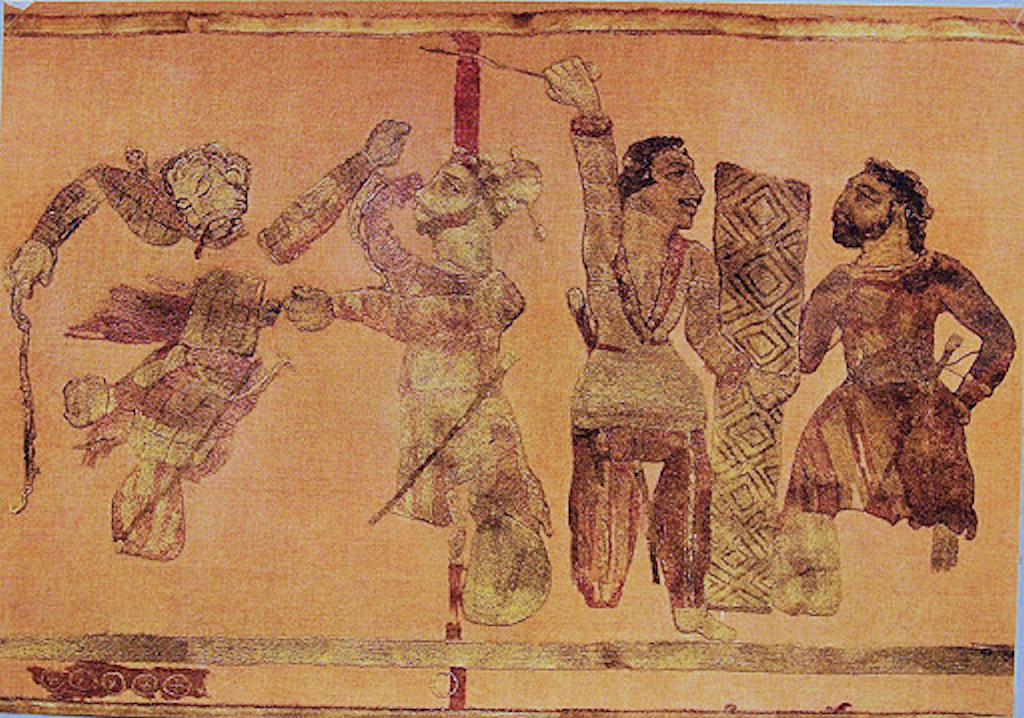
Fighting scene, between Yuezhi (warrior on the left in each pair), and Sogdians (warriors on the right in each pair).

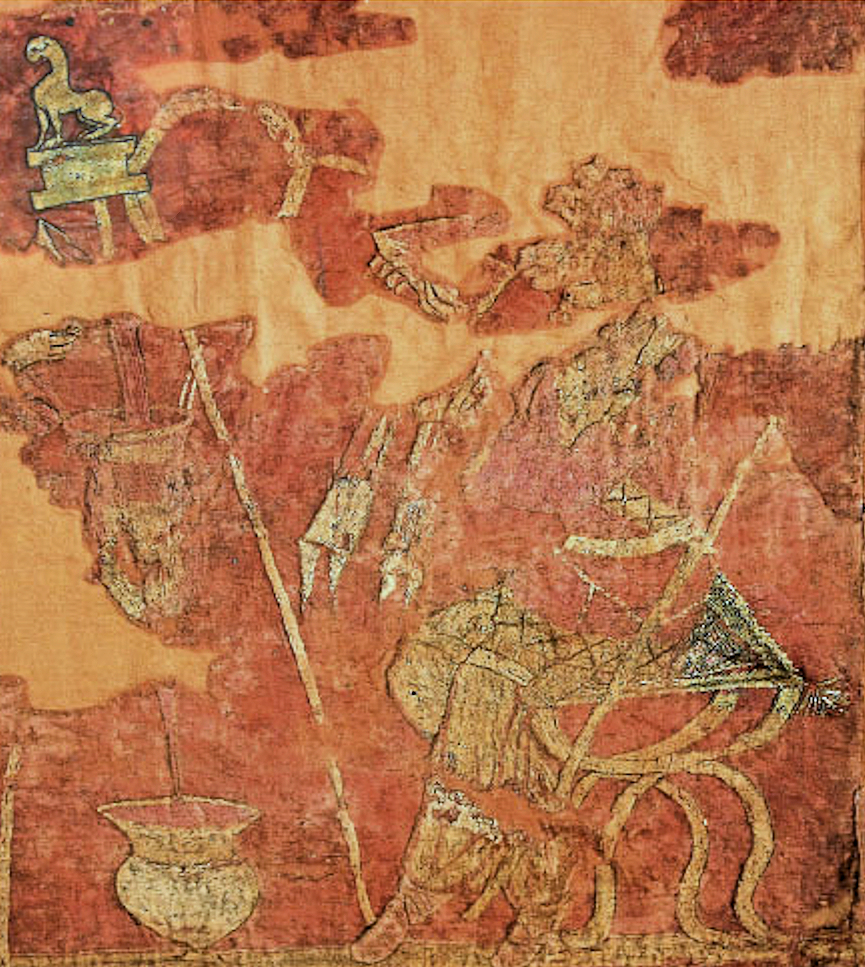
Noin-Ula enthroned figure.

== Anthropology ==
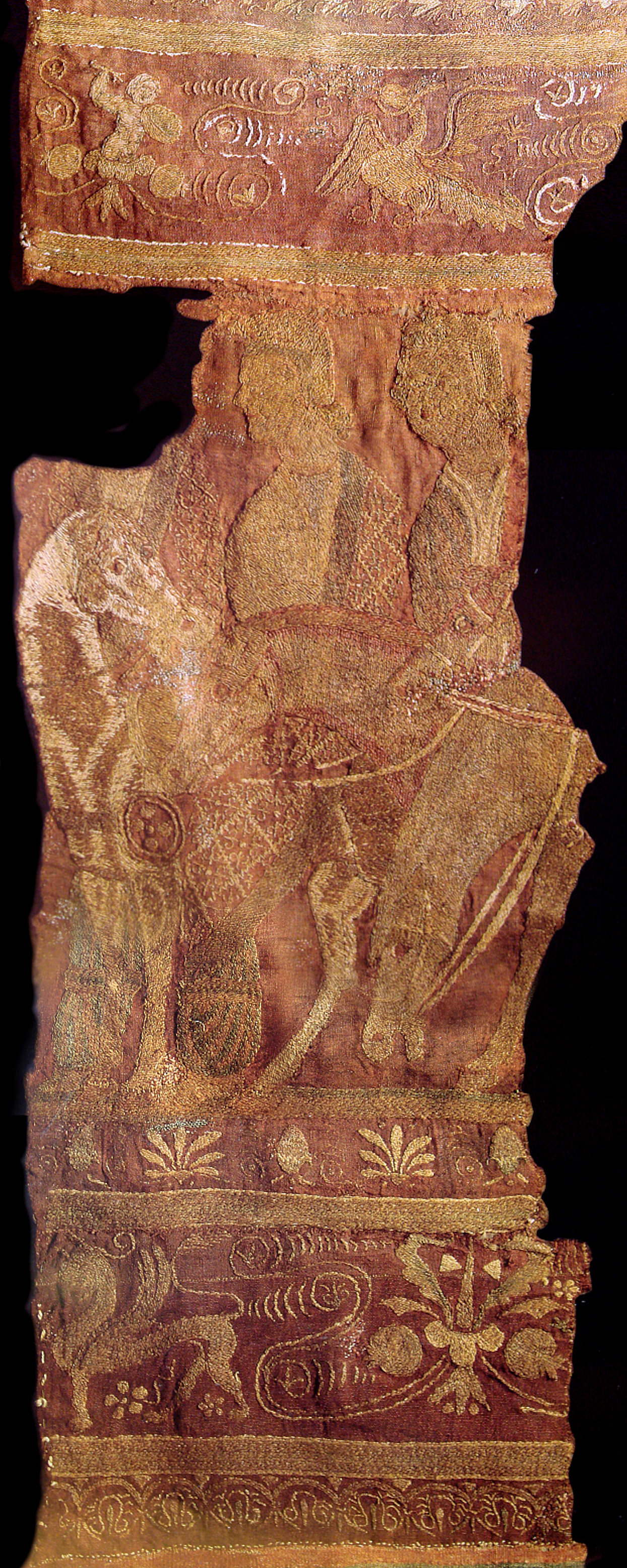
Embroidery with horsemen from the burial chamber of the 6th barrow at Noin-Ula, 1st century CE. Hermitage Museum No. MR 1953.

The Noin-Ula burials were intensively studied, but because the cemetery was desecrated in antiquity and bodies removed, no craniological, odontological, or genetic studies could be conducted. One exception is the odontological study of preserved enamel caps of seven permanent teeth belonging to a young woman. The study describes highly diagnostic traits with a very rare combination found in certain ancient and modern populations of the Caspian–Aral region and in the northern Indus–Ganges interfluve. A Parthian woolen cloth in the grave indicates that the woman was of northwestern Indian origin associated with the Parthian culture. The finds suggest that at the beginning of the Common Era, peoples of Parthian origin were incorporated within Xiongnu society.

== See also ==
- Pazyryk burials
