= Dunhong =

Dunhong Mountain

Geography
- Location: Xinjiang

The Dunhong Mountain (Chinese: 敦薨山), according to Classic of Mountains and Seas, is a mountain of the Tian Shan range.

This mountain has been proposed to be the homeland of the Yuezhi. According to archaeologist Lin Meicun (林梅村), this is the Dunhuang (Chinese: 燉煌) mentioned in the Shiji by Sima Qian, which states that:

The Yuezhi originally lived in the area between the Qilian Shan and Dunhuang, but after they were defeated by the Xiongnu they moved far away to the west, beyond Dayuan [the Ferghana Valley], where they attacked and conquered the people of Daxia [Bactria] ...

Lin Meicun argued that the present Dunhuang (Chinese: 敦煌, 燉煌), a Gansu oasis town, was founded around 111 BC, that is, later than the report of Zhang Qian on the Yuezhi (126 BC). Therefore, the Dunhuan referred to in the Shiji cannot be the city currently bearing that name, and is most likely an oasis near Turpan.

Place names such Dunhong and Qilian may have had Indo-European etymologies, from at two possible sources. For example:

- Lin Meicun suggested that Dunhuan is the Chinese spelling of Tushara (an Eastern Iranian people), and;
- Victor Mair noted the word kaelum in the Tocharian languages of the Tarim Basin, meaning "sky" or "heaven" (and therefore related distantly to the Latin caelum) which may have been the basis of qilian.

According to a Tang Dynasty commentator on the Shiji, qilian was a Xiongnu word for "sky" – although Xiongnu may also have borrowed the word from an Indo-European language.
