= Yuezhi =

Ancient people mentioned in Chinese histories

月氏 *ŋod kje
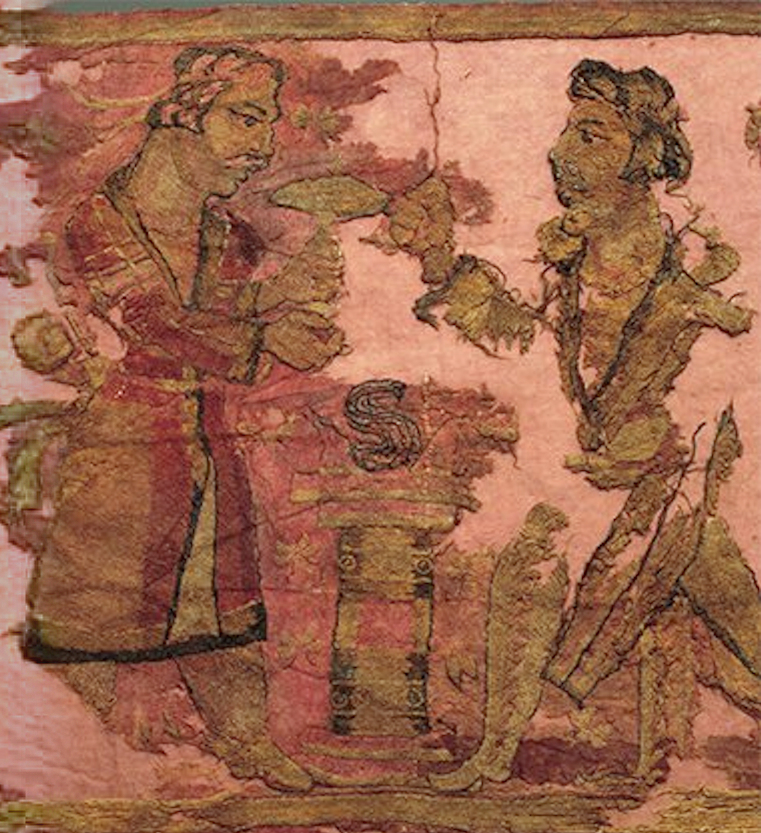
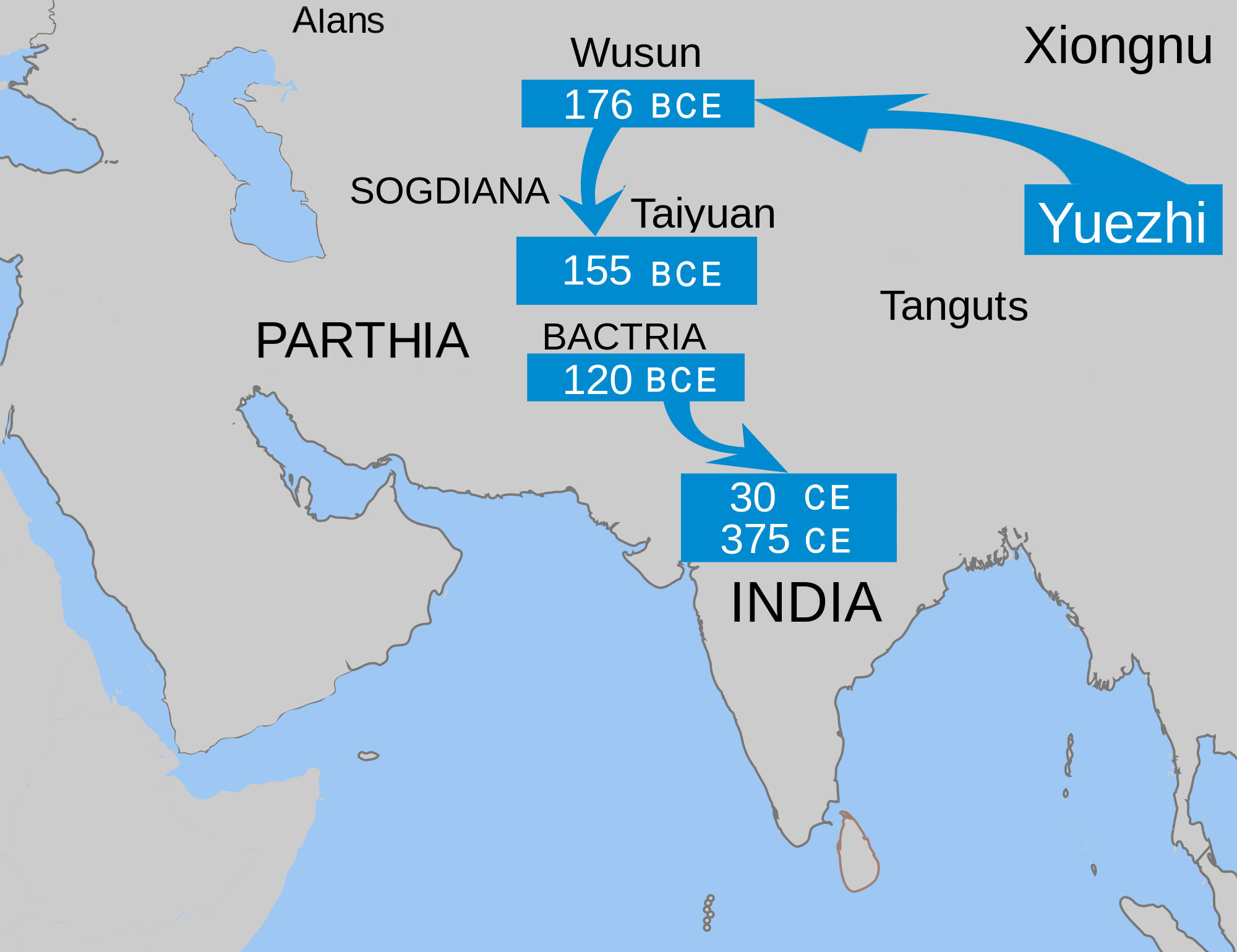
- Figures in the embroidered carpets of the Noin-Ula burial site, proposed to be Yuezhis (1st century BC – 1st century AD). The migrations of the Yuezhi through Central Asia, from around 176 BC to 30 AD

Total population
- Some 100,000 to 200,000 horse archers, according to the Shiji, Chapter 123. The Hanshu Chapter 96A records: 100,000 households, 400,000 people with 100,000 able to bear arms.

Regions with significant populations
- Western China: (pre-2nd century BC)
- Central Asia: (2nd century BC-1st century AD)
- Northern India: (1st century AD-4th century AD)

Languages
- Bactrian (in Bactria in the 1st century AD)

Religion
- Hinduism (Northern Shaivism); Jainism; Buddhism; Zoroastrianism; Manichaeism; Kushan deities

The Yuezhi (Note: Chinese: 月氏; pinyin: Yuèzhī, Ròuzhī or Rùzhī; Wade–Giles: Yüeh^{⁴}-chih^{¹}, Jou^{⁴}-chih^{¹} or Ju^{⁴}-chih^{¹}) were an ancient people first described in Chinese histories as nomadic pastoralists living in an arid grassland area in the western part of the modern Chinese province of Gansu, during the 1st millennium BC. After a major defeat at the hands of the Xiongnu in 176 BC, the Yuezhi split into two groups migrating in different directions: the Greater Yuezhi (Note: Dà Yuèzhī 大月氏) and Lesser Yuezhi. (Note: Xiǎo Yuèzhī 小月氏) This started a complex domino effect that radiated in all directions and, in the process, set the course of history for much of Asia for centuries to come.

The Greater Yuezhi initially migrated northwest into the Ili Valley (on the modern borders of China and Kazakhstan), where they reportedly displaced elements of the Sakas. They were driven from the Ili Valley by the Wusun and migrated southward to Sogdia and later settled in Bactria. The Greater Yuezhi have consequently often been identified with peoples mentioned in classical European sources as having overrun the Greco-Bactrian Kingdom, like the Tochari (Note: Latin: Tocharī, from Ancient Greek: Τόχαροι, romanized: Tókharoi; Sanskrit: तुखाराः, romanized: Tukhārāḥ; singular: तुखार Tukhāra.) and Asii. (Note: or Asioi) During the 1st century BC, one of the five major Greater Yuezhi tribes in Bactria, the Kushanas, (Note: Chinese: 貴霜; pinyin: Guìshuāng) began to subsume the other tribes and neighbouring peoples. The subsequent Kushan Empire, at its peak in the 3rd century AD, stretched from Turfan in the Tarim Basin in the north to Pataliputra on the Gangetic plain of India in the south. The Kushans played an important role in the development of trade on the Silk Road and the introduction of Buddhism to China and spread of Hinduism to Central Asia.

The Lesser Yuezhi migrated southward to the edge of the Tibetan Plateau. Some are reported to have settled among the Qiang people in Qinghai, and to have been involved in the Liang Province Rebellion (184–221 AD) against the Eastern Han dynasty. The Lesser Yuezhi have been strongly linked to the Lushuihu people of northwestern China, who founded the Northern Liang (397–439 AD), and to a lesser extent the Jie people of Shanxi, who established the Later Zhao (319–351 AD), but these claims remain controversial. Another group of Yuezhi is said to have founded the city state of Cumuḍa (now known as Kumul and Hami) in the eastern Tarim.

Many scholars believe that the Yuezhi were an Indo-European people. Although some scholars have associated them with artifacts of extinct cultures in the Tarim Basin, such as the Tarim mummies and texts recording the Tocharian languages, there is no evidence for any such link.

Timeline of the Yuezhi
Before 221 BCE	The Yuezhi are powerful near Dunhuang, near the western end of the Hexi Corridor, and control the jade trade from the Tarim Basin. Somewhere west are the Wusun, and further east near the Ordos plateau are the Xiongnu or their precursors.
215 BCE	The Xiongnu are defeated by the Qin dynasty and retreat northwards into the Mongolian Plateau.
207 BCE	The Xiongnu begin a campaign of raids against the Yuezhi.
Circa 176 BCE	The Xiongnu inflict a major defeat on the Yuezhi.
173 BCE	The Yuezhi defeat the Wusun.
165 BCE	The majority of the Yuezhi begin migrating west to the Ili valley; this faction is known later as the "Great Yuezhi". Most of the other faction, known as the "Lesser Yuezhi", settle on the Tibetan Plateau and in the Tarim basin.
132 BCE	The Wusun attack the Great Yuezhi, forcing them southward from the Ili valley.
132–130 BCE	The Great Yuezhi migrate west, then south and settle in north-west Bactria.
128 BCE	A Chinese envoy named Zhang Qian reaches the Great Yuezhi.
Circa 30 CE	One of five tribes comprising the Great Yuezhi tribes, the Kushana, become dominant and form the basis of the Kushan Empire.

== Earliest references in Chinese texts ==
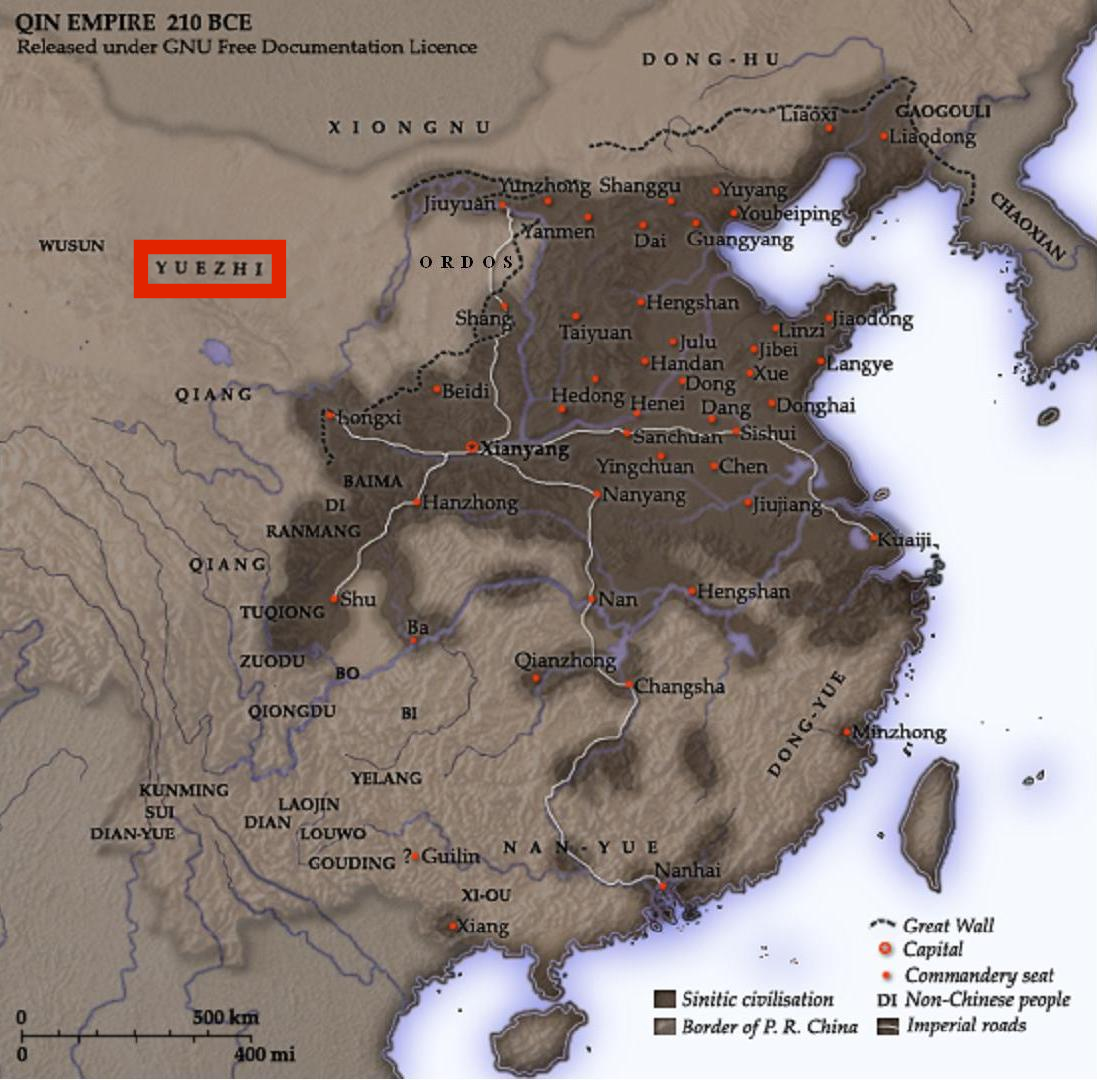
Circa 210 BC, the Yuezhi resided to the northwest of Qin China.

Three pre-Han texts mention peoples who appear to be the Yuezhi, albeit under slightly different names.

- The philosophical tract Guanzi (73, 78, 80 and 81) mentions nomadic pastoralists known as the Yúzhī (Note: 禺氏 (Old Chinese: *ŋʷjo-kje)) or Niúzhī, (Note: 牛氏 (OC: *ŋʷjə-kje)) who supplied jade to the Chinese. (The Guanzi is now generally believed to have been compiled around 26 BC, based on older texts, including some from the Qi state era of the 11th to 3rd centuries BC. Most scholars no longer attribute its primary authorship to Guan Zhong, a Qi official in the 7th century BC.) The export of jade from the Tarim Basin, since at least the late 2nd millennium BC, is well-documented archaeologically. For example, hundreds of jade pieces found in the Tomb of Fu Hao (c. 1200 BC) originated from the Khotan area, on the southern rim of the Tarim Basin. According to the Guanzi, the Yúzhī/Niúzhī, unlike the neighbouring Xiongnu, did not engage in conflict with nearby Chinese states.
- The epic novel Tale of King Mu, Son of Heaven (early 4th century BC) also mentions a plain of Yúzhī (Note: 禺知 (OC: *ŋʷjo-kje)) to the northwest of the Zhou lands.
- Chapter 59 of the Yi Zhou Shu (probably dating from the 4th to 1st century BC) refers to a Yúzhī (Note: 禺氏 (OC: *ŋʷjo-kje)) people living to the northwest of the Zhou domain and offering horses as tribute. A late supplement contains the name Yuèdī, (Note: 月氐 (OC: *ŋʷjat-tij)) which may be a misspelling of the name Yuèzhī (Note: 月氏 (OC: *ŋʷjat-kje)) found in later texts.

In the 1st century BC, Sima Qian – widely regarded as the founder of Chinese historiography – describes how the Qin dynasty (221–206 BC) bought jade and highly valued military horses from a people that Sima Qian called the Wūzhī, (Note: 烏氏 (OC: *ʔa-kje)) led by a man named Luo. The Wūzhī traded these goods for Chinese silk, which they then sold on to other neighbours. This is probably the first reference to the Yuezhi as a lynchpin in trade on the Silk Road, which in the 3rd century BC began to link Chinese states to Central Asia and, eventually, the Middle East, the Mediterranean and Europe.

== Account of Zhang Qian ==
The earliest detailed account of the Yuezhi is found in chapter 123 of the Records of the Great Historian by Sima Qian, describing a mission of Zhang Qian in the late 2nd century BC. Essentially the same text appears in chapter 61 of the Book of Han, though Sima Qian has added occasional words and phrases to clarify the meaning.

Both texts use the name Yuèzhī, (Note: 月氏 (OC: *ŋʷjat-kje)) composed of characters meaning "moon" and "clan" respectively. Several different romanizations of this Chinese-language name have appeared in print. The Iranologist H. W. Bailey preferred Üe-ṭşi. Another modern Chinese pronunciation of the name is Ròuzhī, based on the thesis that the character 月 in the name is a scribal error for 肉; however Thierry considers this thesis "thoroughly wrong".

=== Conflict with Xiongnu ===
The Book of Han account of the Yuezhi begins with them occupying the grasslands to the northwest of China at the beginning of the 2nd century BCE:

Original location of the Yuezhi in Gansu circa 200 BCE, per Chinese sources (in black, "between Dunhuang and Qilian"). Alternate possible original location in red (Tian Shan mountains), suggested by some authors.

The Great Yuezhi were a nomadic horde. They moved about following their cattle, and had the same customs as those of the Xiongnu. As their soldiers numbered more than a hundred thousand, they were strong and despised the Xiongnu. In the past, they lived in the region between Dunhuang and Qilian.

— Book of Han, 61

The area between the Qilian Mountains and Dunhuang lies in the western part of the modern Chinese province of Gansu, but no archaeological remains of the Yuezhi have yet been found in this area. Some scholars have argued that "Dunhuang" should be Dunhong, a mountain in the Tian Shan, and that Qilian should be interpreted as a name for the Tian Shan. They have thus placed the original homeland of the Yuezhi 1,000 km further northwest in the grasslands to the north of the Tian Shan (in the northern part of modern Xinjiang). Other authors suggest that the area identified by Sima Qian was merely the core area of an empire encompassing the western part of the Mongolian plain, the upper reaches of the Yellow River, the Tarim Basin and possibly much of central Asia, including the Altai Mountains, the site of the Pazyryk burials of the Ukok Plateau.

By the late 3rd century BCE the Yuezhi appear to have often been in conflict with the Xiongnu and the Wusun – another neighbouring people, who had originally lived together alongside the Yuezhi, in the region between Dunhuang and Qilian Mountain. (The only surviving accounts of these interactions were evidently obtained later from non-Yuezhi sources – as shown by the fact that they did not record the personal names of individual Yuezhi, including their leaders.) Gradually the Xiongnu grew stronger, and began to challenge the Yuezhi militarily. There were at least four wars between the two peoples, according to Chinese accounts. The first war broke out during the reign of the Xiongnu monarch Touman (who died in 209 BCE). After Touman had sent his eldest son, Modu Chanyu, to the Yuezhi as a hostage, Touman made a surprise attack on the Yuezhi. Despite attempts by the Yuezhi to kill him, Modu stole a horse and managed to escape to his country. It appears that the Xiongnu did not prevail in this first war; Modu subsequently killed his father and became ruler of the Xiongnu. The second war took place in the seventh year of Modu's reign (203 BCE), when the Xiongnu seized a large area of the territory originally belonging to the Yuezhi, and their dominance began to fade. In a third war, probably before or in 176 BCE, one of Modu's subordinate tribal chiefs led an invasion of Yuezhi territory in the Gansu region, and inflicted a crushing defeat on the Yuezhi. Modu boasted in a letter (174 BC) to the Han emperor, that due to "the excellence of his fighting men, and the strength of his horses, he has succeeded in wiping out the Yuezhi, slaughtering or forcing to submission every number of the tribe." (Shiji 123.) The wife of the murdered king became the new monarch of the Greater Yuezhi. Shortly afterward (173 BCE), the Wusun were reportedly attacked by the Yuezhi, who sought slaves and pasture lands. The Yuezhi killed the Wusun kunmo (monarch), (Note: kunmi Chinese: 昆彌 or kunmo Chinese: 昆莫) named Nandoumi, (Note: Chinese: 難兜靡) and took his territory. The son of Nandoumi, known only by the title kunmo, fled to the Xiongnu and was brought up by their monarch – probably Modu and/or his son, Laoshang Chanyu (who reigned 174–166 BCE). Laoshang later reportedly killed a king of the Yuezhi and, in accordance with nomadic traditions "made a drinking cup out of his skull." (Shiji 123.)

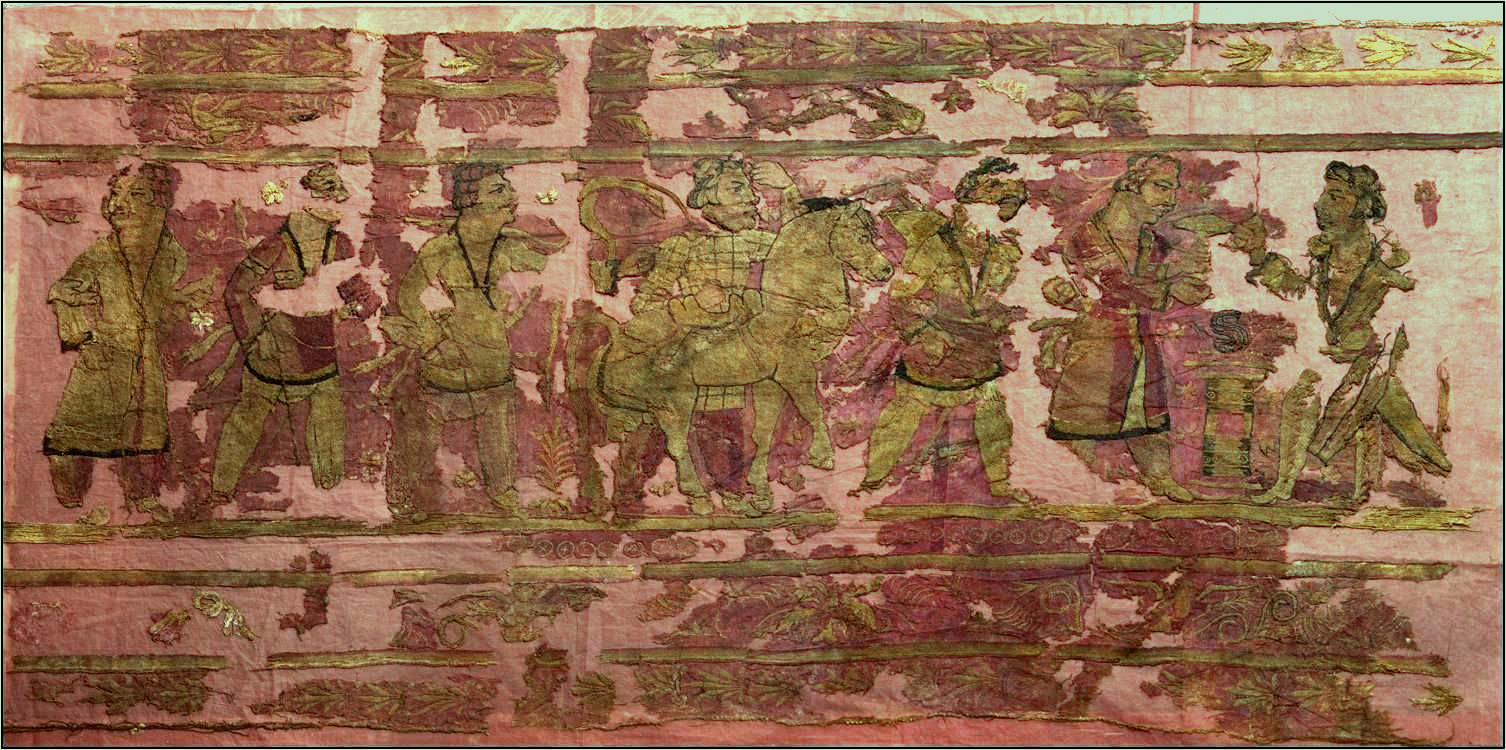
Figures in one of the embroidered carpets of the Xiongnu Noin-Ula burial site, a luxury item probably imported from Bactria. They are thought to represent Yuezhis. 1st century BC - 1st century AD.

=== Exodus of the Great Yuezhi ===
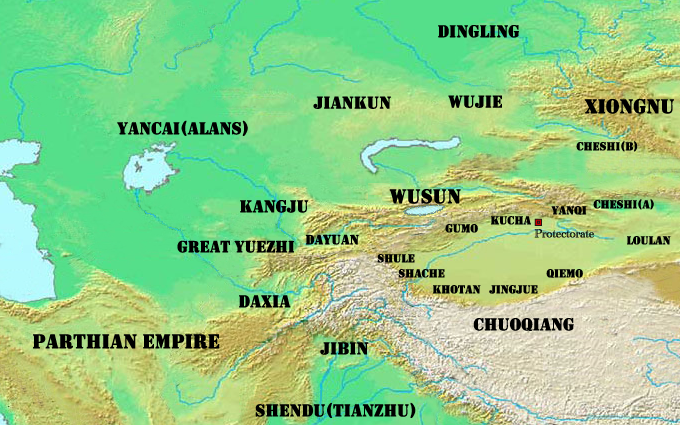
Central Asia in the 1st century BC, and transitory location of the "Great Yuezhi".

After their defeat by the Xiongnu, the Yuezhi split into two groups. The Lesser or Little Yuezhi (Note: Xiao Yuezhi) moved to the "southern mountains", believed to be the Qilian Mountains on the edge of the Tibetan Plateau, to live with the Qiang.

The so-called Greater or Great Yuezhi (Note: Dà Yuèzhī, 大月氏) began migrating north-west in about 165 BC, first settling in the Ili valley, immediately north of the Tian Shan mountains, where they defeated the Sai (Sakas): "The Yuezhi attacked the king of the Sai who moved a considerable distance to the south and the Yuezhi then occupied his lands" (Book of Han 61 4B). This was "the first historically recorded movement of peoples originating in the high plateaus of Asia."

In 132 BC the Wusun, in alliance with the Xiongnu and out of revenge from an earlier conflict, again managed to dislodge the Yuezhi from the Ili Valley, forcing them to move south-west. The Yuezhi passed through the neighbouring urban civilization of Dayuan (in Ferghana) and settled on the northern bank of the Oxus, in the region of northern Bactria, or Transoxiana (modern Tajikistan and Uzbekistan).

=== Visit of Zhang Qian ===
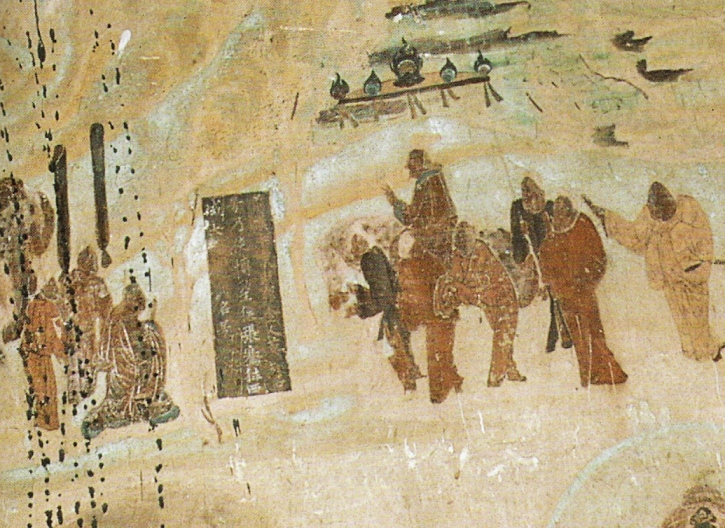
A later mural (c. 618–712 AD) from the Mogao Caves, depicting the Chinese mission of Zhang Qian to the Yuezhi in 126 BC.

The Yuezhi were visited in Transoxiana by a Chinese mission, led by Zhang Qian in 126 BC, which sought an offensive alliance with the Yuezhi against the Xiongnu. His request for an alliance was denied by the Yuezhi, who now had a peaceful life in Transoxiana and had no interest in revenge. Zhang Qian, who spent a year in Transoxiana and Bactria, wrote a detailed account in the Shiji, which gives considerable insight into the situation in Central Asia at the time.

Zhang Qian also reported:

the Great Yuezhi live 2,000 or 3,000 li [832–1,247 kilometers] west of Dayuan, north of the Gui [Oxus ] river. They are bordered on the south by Daxia [Bactria], on the west by Anxi [Parthia], and on the north by Kangju [beyond the middle Jaxartes/Syr Darya]. They are a nation of nomads, moving from place to place with their herds, and their customs are like those of the Xiongnu. They have some 100,000 or 200,000 archer warriors.

— Shiji, 123

In a sweeping analysis of the physical types and cultures of Central Asia, Zhang Qian reports:

Although the states from Dayuan west to Anxi (Parthia), speak rather different languages, their customs are generally similar and their languages mutually intelligible. The men have deep-set eyes and profuse beards and whiskers. They are skilful at commerce and will haggle over a fraction of a cent. Women are held in great respect, and the men make decisions on the advice of their women.

— Shiji, 123

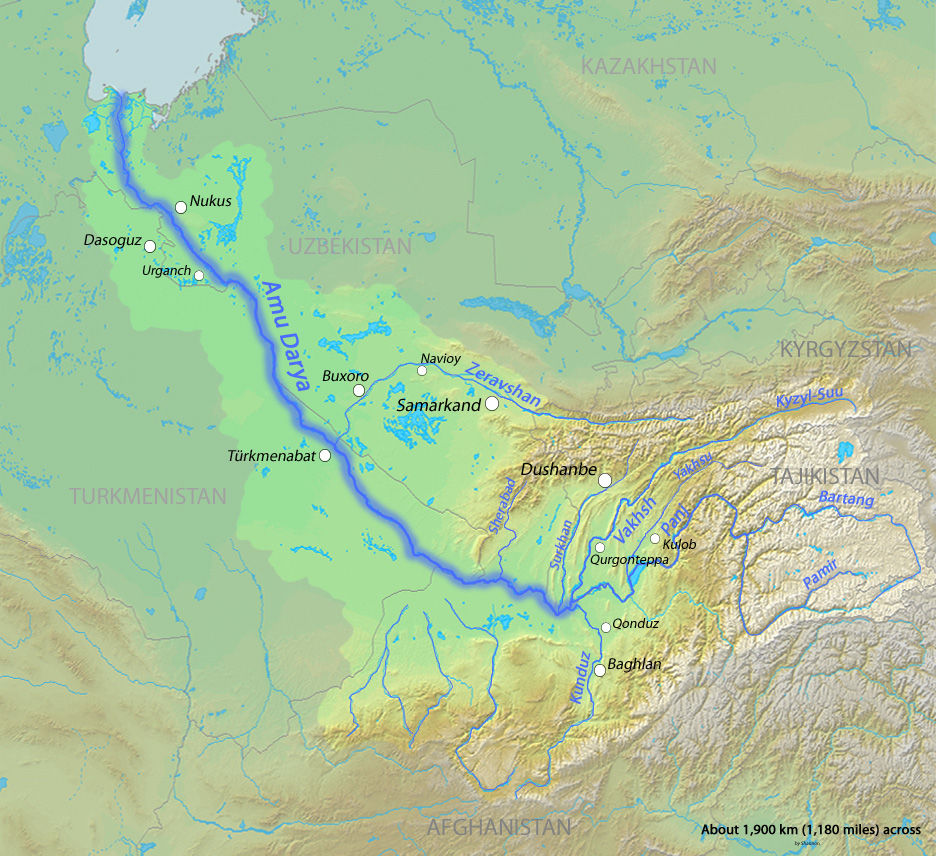
Watershed of the Oxus River (modern Amu Darya)

Zhang Qian also described the remnants of the Greco-Bactrian Kingdom on the other side of the Oxus River (Chinese Gui) as a number of autonomous city-states under Yuezhi suzerainty:

Daxia is located over 2,000 li southwest of Dayuan, south of the Gui river. Its people cultivate the land and have cities and houses. Their customs are like those of Ta-Yuan. It has no great ruler but only a number of petty chiefs ruling the various cities. The people are poor in the use of arms and afraid of battle, but they are clever at commerce. After the Great Yuezhi moved west and attacked the lands, the entire country came under their sway. The population of the country is large, numbering some 1,000,000 or more persons. The capital is called the city of Lanshi and has a market where all sorts of goods are bought and sold.

— Shiji, 123

== Later Chinese accounts ==
The next mention of the Yuezhi in Chinese sources is found in chapter 96A of the Book of Han (completed in AD 111), relating to the early 1st century BC. At this time, the Yuezhi are described as occupying the whole of Bactria, organized into five major tribes or xīhóu. (Note: Ch:翖侯, "Allied Prince") These tribes were known to the Chinese as:

- Xiūmì (休密) in Western Wakhān and Zibak;
- Guìshuāng (貴霜) in Badakhshan and adjoining territories north of the Oxus;
- Shuāngmí (雙靡) in the region of Shughnan or Chitral.
- Xīdùn (肸頓) in the region of Balkh, and;
- Dūmì (都密) in the region of Termez.
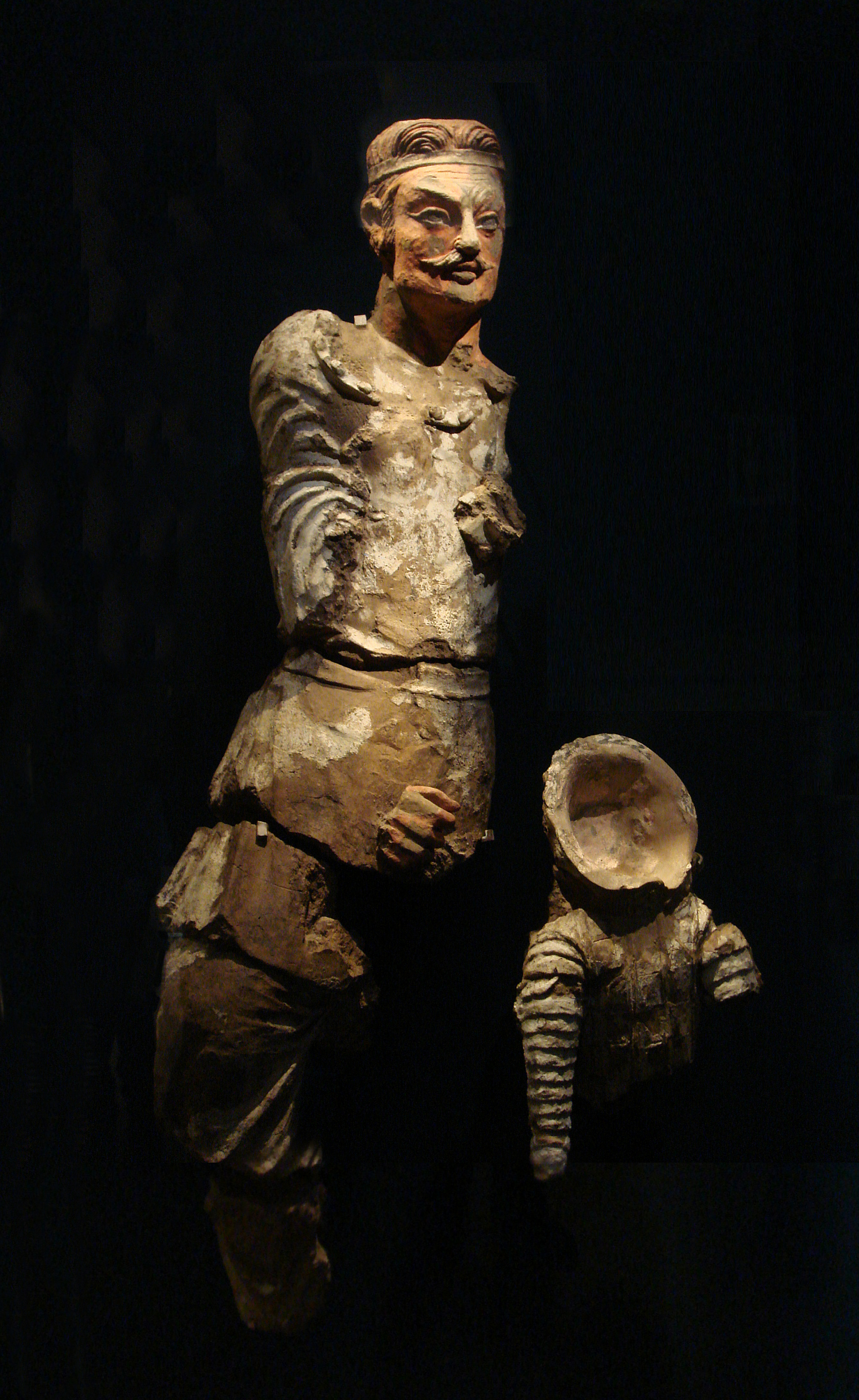
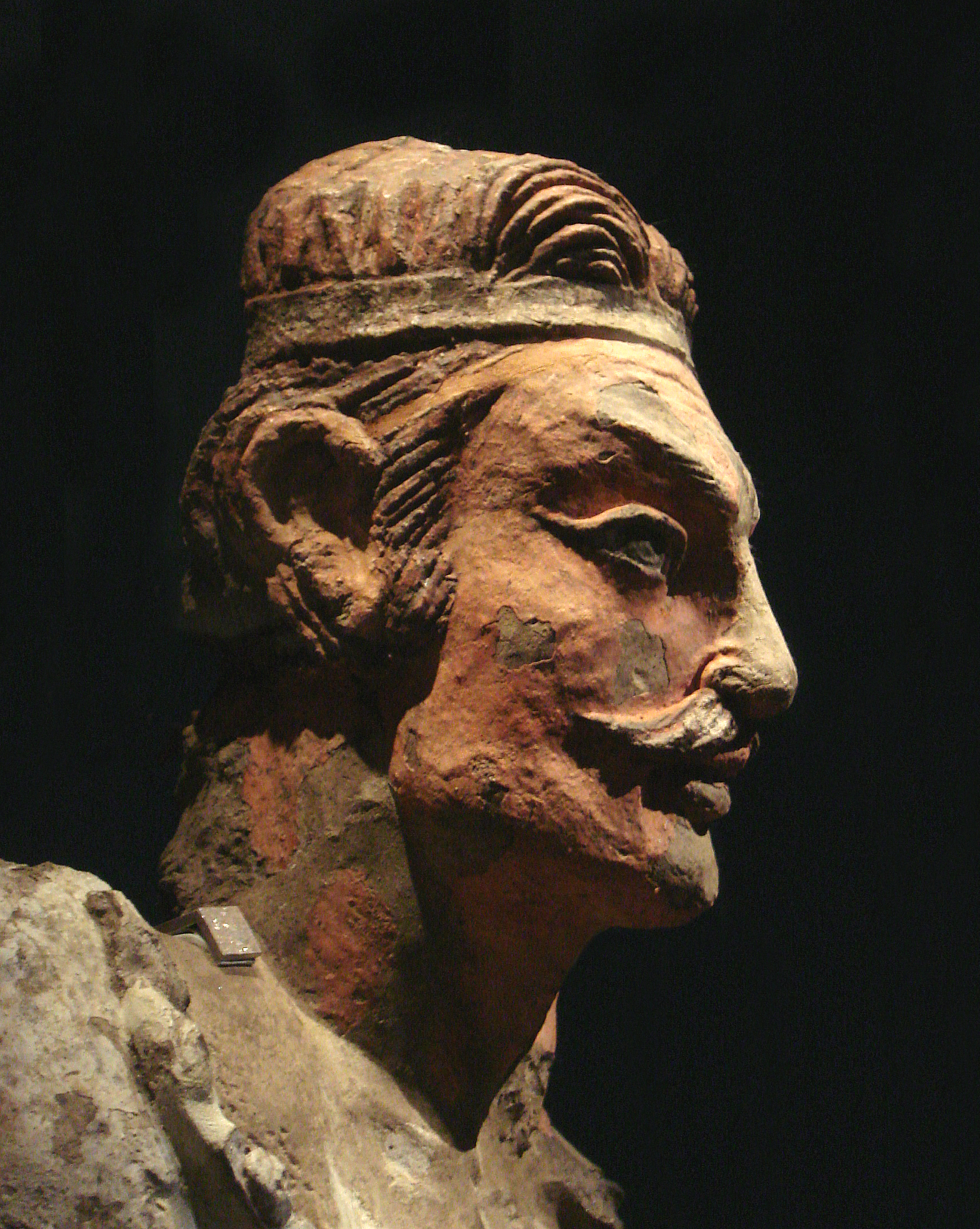
Yuezhi Prince from Khalchayan, 1st century BCE. He displays artificial cranial deformation. At his feet, a lamellar armour with neck-guard, a trophy from the Saka Scythians. Museum of Arts of Uzbekistan, nb 40.

The Book of the Later Han (5th century CE) also records the visit of Yuezhi envoys to the Chinese capital in 2 BC, who gave oral teachings on Buddhist sutras to a student, suggesting that some Yuezhi already followed the Buddhist faith during the 1st century BC (Baldev Kumar 1973).

Chapter 88 of the Book of the Later Han relies on a report of Ban Yong, based on the campaigns of his father Ban Chao in the late 1st century AD. It reports that one of the five tribes of the Yuezhi, the Guishuang, had managed to take control of the tribal confederation:

More than a hundred years later, the xihou of Guishuang, named Qiujiu Que (Note: Ch: 丘就卻, Kujula Kadphises) attacked and exterminated the four other xihou. He set himself up as king of a kingdom called Guishuang (Kushan). He invaded Anxi (Parthia) and took the Gaofu (Note: Ch:高附, Kabul) region. He also defeated the whole of the kingdoms of Puda and Jibin. (Note: Ch: 罽賓, Kapiśa-Gandhāra) Qiujiu Que (Kujula Kadphises) was more than eighty years old when he died. His son, Yan Gaozhen (Note: Ch:閻高珍) (Vima Takto), became king in his place. He returned and defeated Tianzhu (Northwestern India) and installed a General to supervise and lead it. The Yuezhi then became extremely rich. All the kingdoms call [their king] the Guishuang (Kushan) king, but the Han call them by their original name, Da Yuezhi.

— Book of the Later Han, trans. John Hill

A later Chinese annotation in Zhang Shoujie's Shiji (quoting Wan Zhen 萬震 in Nánzhōuzhì 南州志 ["Strange Things from the Southern Region"], a now-lost 3rd-century text from the Wu kingdom), describes the Kushans as living in the same general area north of India, in cities of Greco-Roman style, and with sophisticated handicraft. The quotes are dubious, as Wan Zhen probably never visited the Yuezhi kingdom through the Silk Road, though he might have gathered his information from the trading ports in the coastal south. Chinese sources continued to use the name Yuezhi and seldom used the Kushan (or Guishuang) as a generic term:

The Great Yuezhi are located about seven thousand li [2,910 km] north of India. Their land is at a high altitude; the climate is dry; the region is remote. The king of the state calls himself "son of heaven". There are so many riding horses in that country that the number often reaches several hundred thousand. City layouts and palaces are quite similar to those of Daqin [the Roman Empire]. The skin of the people there is reddish white. People are skilful at horse archery. Local products, rarities, treasures, clothing, and upholstery are very good, and even India cannot compare with it.

— Wan Zhen (3rd century AD)

== Kushana ==
Yuezhis in Bactria, on Noin-Ula carpets

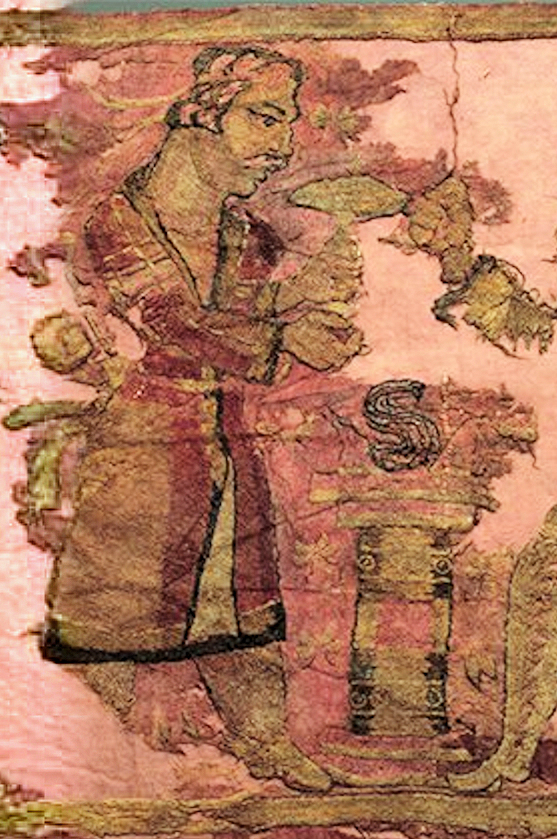
Yuezhi nobleman over firealtar, Noin-Ula.

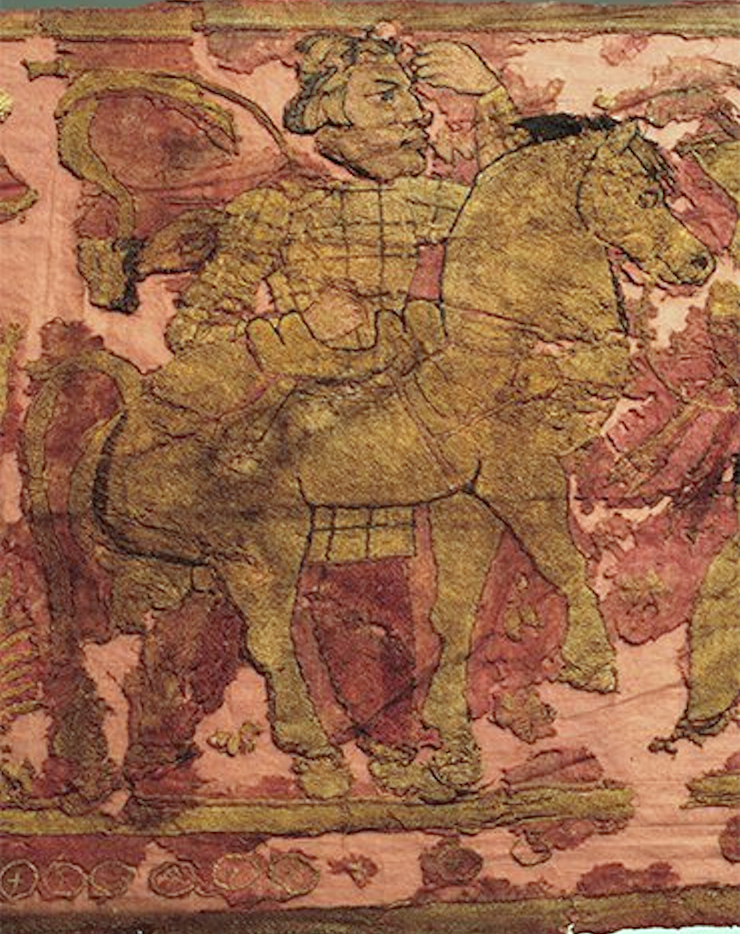
Yuezhi armoured horseman, Noin-Ula.

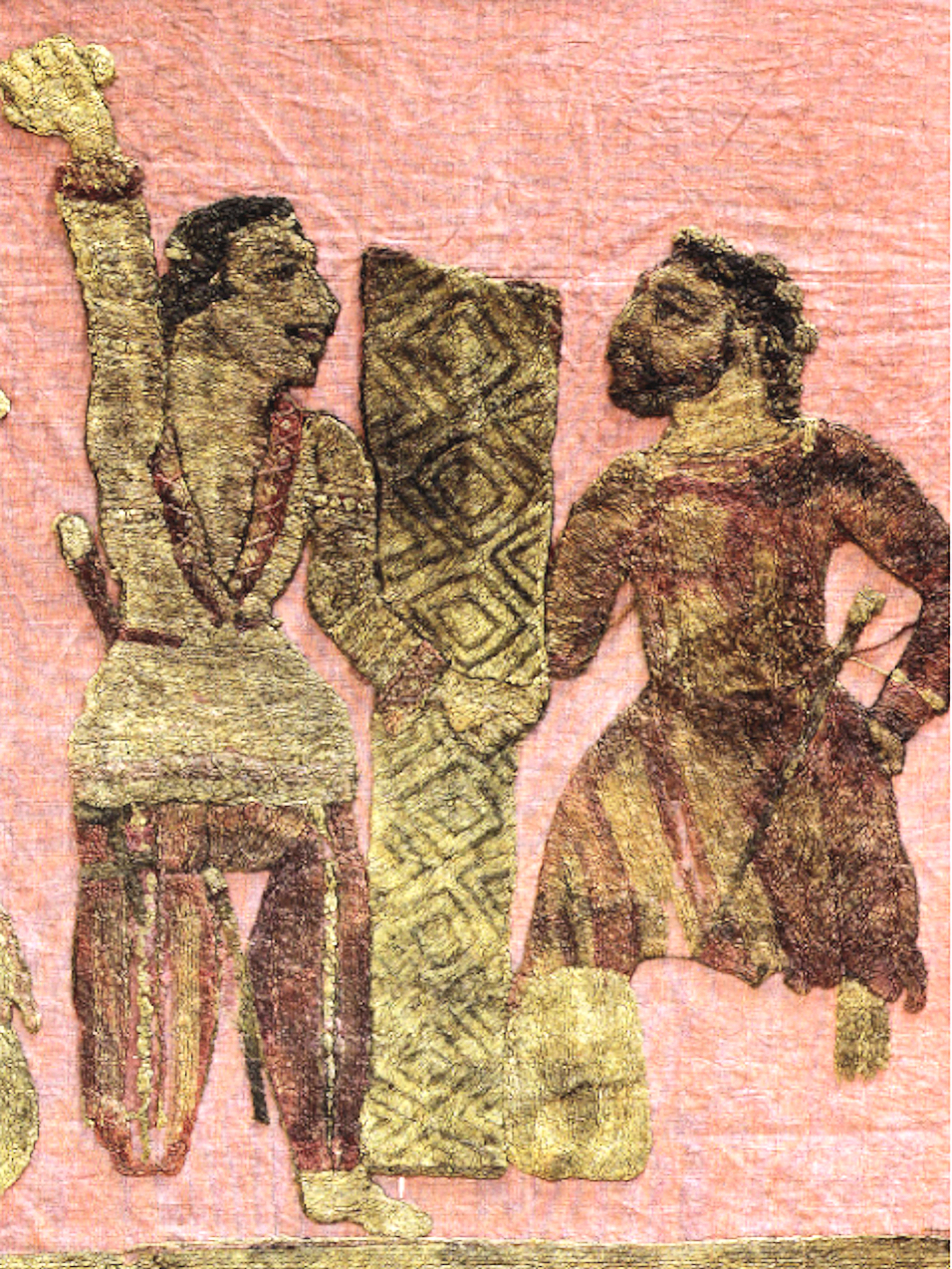
Yuezhi (left) fighting a Sogdian behind a shield (right), Noin-Ula.

The Central Asian people who called themselves Kushana, were among the conquerors of the Greco-Bactrian Kingdom during the 2nd century BC, and are widely believed to have originated as a dynastic clan or tribe of the Yuezhi. The area of Bactria they settled came to be known as Tokharistan. Because some inhabitants of Bactria became known as Tukhāra (Sanskrit) or Tókharoi (Τοχάριοι; Greek), these names later became associated with the Yuezhi.

The Kushana spoke Bactrian, an Eastern Iranian language.

=== Bactria ===
In the 3rd century BC, Bactria had been conquered by the Greeks under Alexander the Great and since settled by the Hellenistic civilization of the Seleucids.

The resulting Greco-Bactrian Kingdom lasted until the 2nd century BC. The area came under pressure from various nomadic peoples and the Greek city of Alexandria on the Oxus was apparently burnt to the ground in about 145 BC. The last Greco-Bactrian king, Heliocles I, retreated and moved his capital to the Kabul Valley. In about 140–130 BC, the Greco-Bactrian state was conquered by the nomads and dissolved. The Greek geographer Strabo mentions this event in his account of the central Asian tribes he called "Scythians":

All, or the greatest part of them, are nomads. The best known tribes are those who deprived the Greeks of Bactriana: the Asii, Pasiani, Tochari, and Sacarauli, who came from the country on the other side of the Jaxartes [Syr Darya], opposite the Sacae and Sogdiani.

— Strabo,

Early Yuezhis coinage

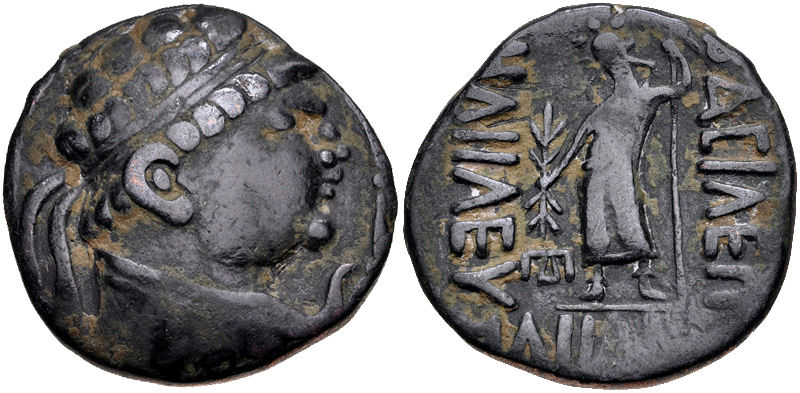
Yuezhi anonymous copy of a coin of Greco-Bactrian king Heliocles

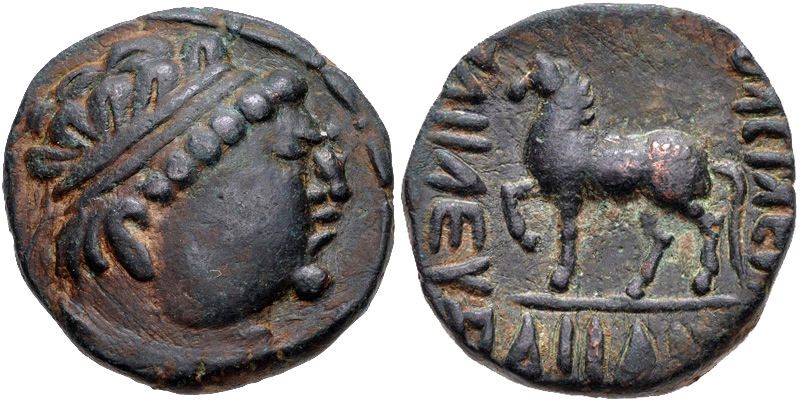
Yuezhi anonymous of a coin of Greco-Bactrian king Heliocles, with original horse on the reverse

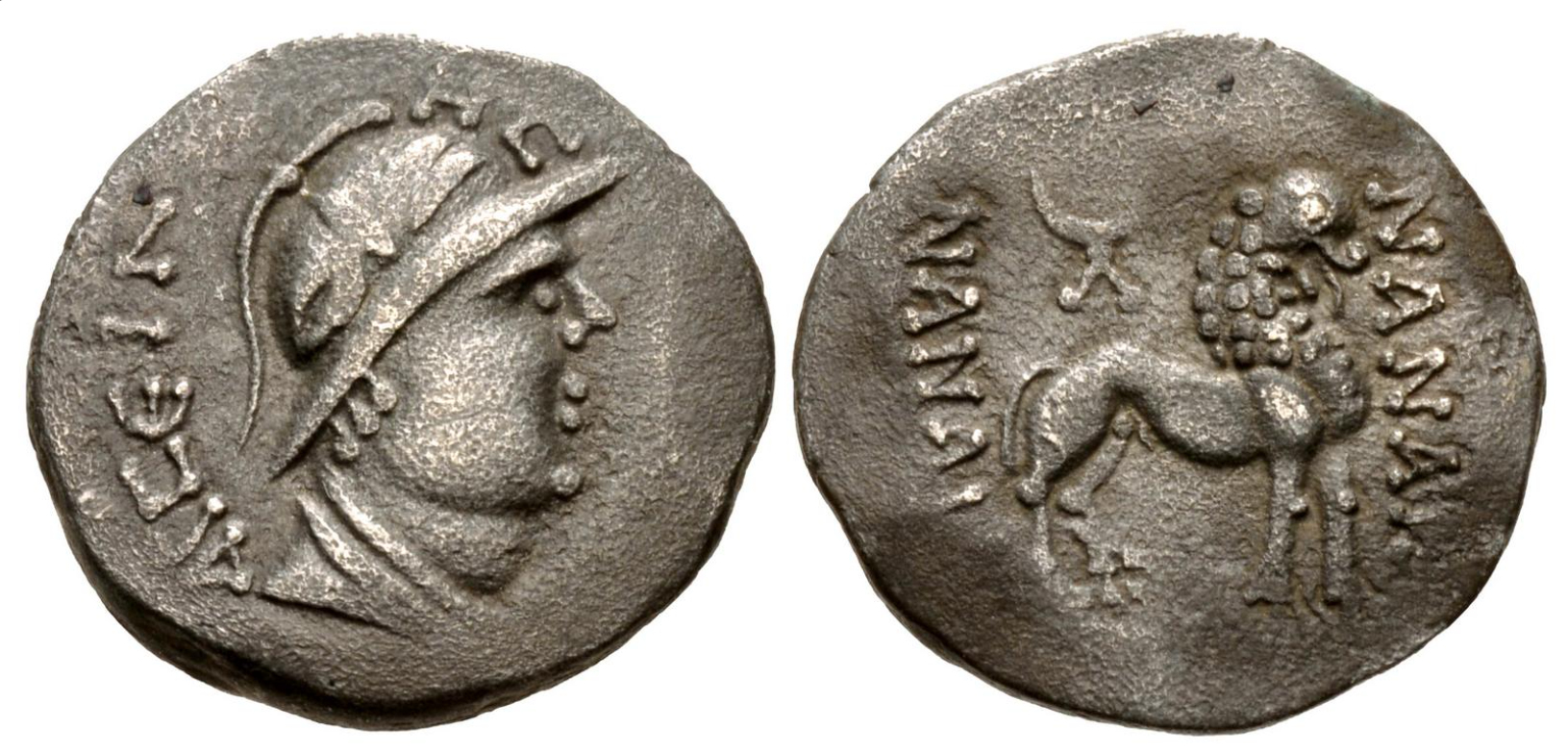
Yuezhi ruler Arseiles. Late 1st century BCE

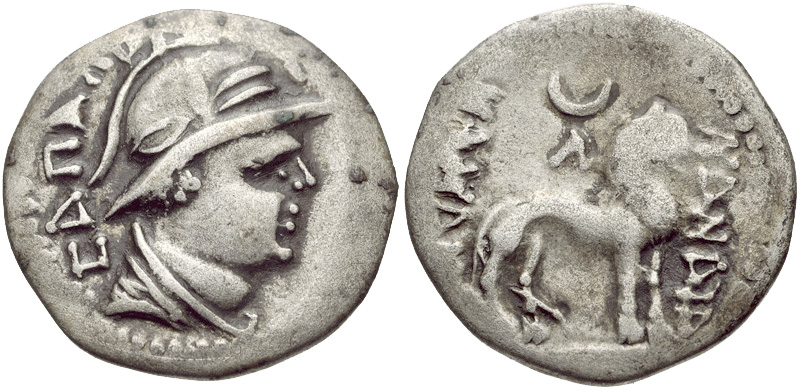
Yuezhi ruler Sapadbizes. Late 1st century BCE

Writing in the 1st century BC, the Roman historian Pompeius Trogus attributed the destruction of the Greco-Bactrian state to the Sacaraucae and the Asiani "kings of the Tochari". Both Pompeius and the Roman historian Justin (2nd century AD) record that the Parthian king Artabanus I was mortally wounded in a war against the Tochari in 124 BC. Several relationships between these tribes and those named in Chinese sources have been proposed, but remain contentious.

After they settled in Bactria, the Yuezhi became Hellenized to some degree – as shown by their adoption of the Greek alphabet and by some remaining coins, minted in the style of the Greco-Bactrian kings, with the text in Greek.

==== Noin-Ula carpets ====
According to Sergey Yatsenko, the carpets with vivid embroidered scenes discovered in Noin-Ula were made by the Yuezhi in Bactria, and were obtained by the Xiongnu through commercial exchange or tributary payment, as the Yuezhi may have remained tributaries of the Xiongnu for a long time following their defeat. Embroidered carpets were among the highest-prized luxury items for the Xiongnu. The figures depicted in the carpets are believed to reflect the clothing and customs of the Yuezhi while they were in Bactria in the 1st century BCE-1st century CE.

==== Tillya Tepe ====
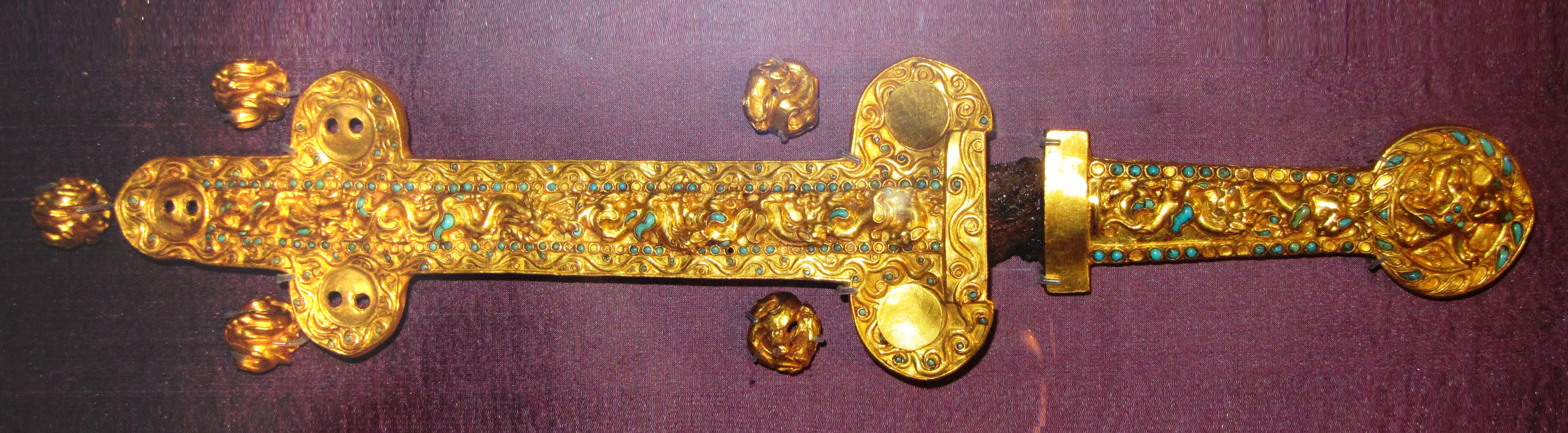
A dagger excavated in Tillya Tepe.

The graves of Tillya Tepe, complete with numerous artifacts, dated to the period between the 1st century BCE and the 1st century CE, probably belonged to the Yuezhis/early Kushans after the fall of the Greco-Bactrian Kingdom and before the rise of the Kushan Empire. They correspond to a time when the Yuezhis had not yet encountered Buddhism.

=== In the Hindu Kush ===
The area of the Hindu Kush (Paropamisadae) was ruled by the western Indo-Greek king until the reign of Hermaeus (reigned c. 90 BC–70 BC). After that date, no Indo-Greek kings are known in the area. According to Bopearachchi, no trace of Indo-Scythian occupation (nor coins of major Indo-Scythian rulers such as Maues or Azes I) have been found in the Paropamisade and western Gandhara. The Hindu Kush may have been subsumed by the Yuezhi, who by then had been dominated by Greco-Bactria for almost two centuries.

As they had done in Bactria with their copying of Greco-Bactrian coinage, the Yuezhi copied the coinage of Hermeaus on a vast scale, up to around 40 AD, when the design blends into the coinage of the Kushan king Kujula Kadphises. Such coins may provide the earliest known names of Yuezhi yabgu (a minor royal title, similar to prince), namely Sapadbizes and/or Agesiles, who both lived in or about 20 BC.

=== Kushan Empire ===
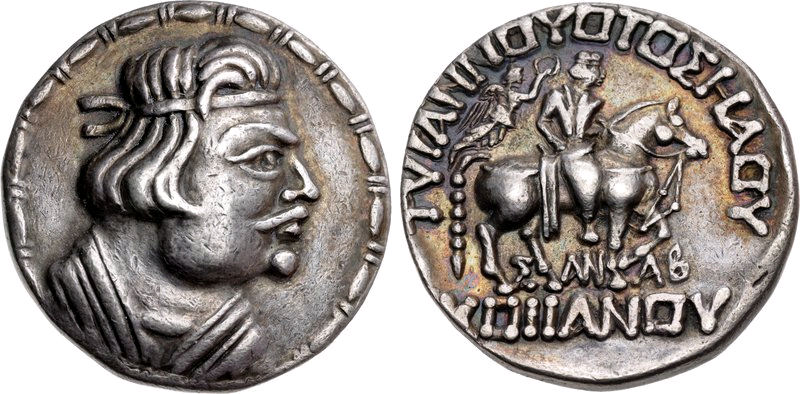
The first self-declared Kushan ruler Heraios (1–30 AD) in Greco-Bactrian style Obv: Bust of Heraios, with Greek royal headband. Rev: Horse-mounted King, crowned with a wreath by the Greek goddess of victory Nike. Greek legend: TVPANNOVOTOΣ HΛOV – ΣΛNΛB – KOÞÞANOY "The Tyrant Heraios, Sanav (meaning unknown), of the Kushans"

After that point, they extended their control over the northwestern area of the Indian subcontinent, founding the Kushan Empire, which was to rule the region for several centuries. Despite their change of name, most Chinese authors continued to refer to the Kushanas as the Yuezhi.

The Kushanas expanded to the east during the 1st century AD. The first Kushan emperor, Kujula Kadphises, ostensibly associated himself with King Hermaeus on his coins.

The Kushanas integrated Buddhism into a pantheon of many deities and became great promoters of Mahayana Buddhism, and their interactions with Greek civilization helped the Gandharan culture and Greco-Buddhism flourish.

During the 1st and 2nd centuries, the Kushan Empire expanded militarily to the north and occupied parts of the Tarim Basin, putting them at the center of the lucrative Central Asian commerce with the Roman Empire. The Kushanas collaborated militarily with the Chinese against their mutual enemies. This included a campaign with the Chinese general Ban Chao against the Sogdians in 84 CE, when the latter were trying to support a revolt by the king of Kashgar. In around AD 85, the Kushanas also assisted the Chinese in an attack on Turpan, east of the Tarim Basin.

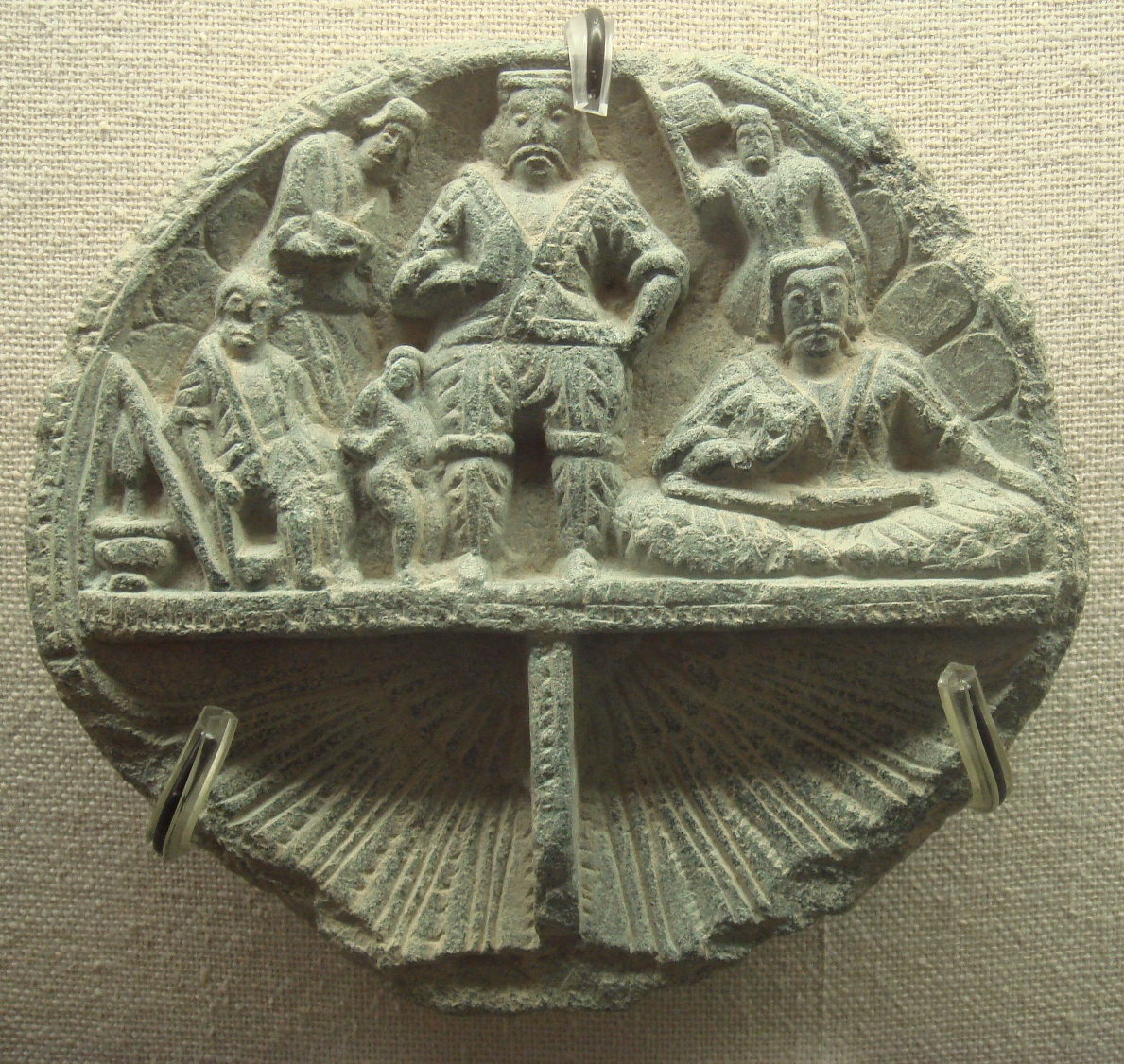
Possible Yuezhi king and attendants, Gandhara stone palette, 1st century AD

Following the military support provided to the Han, the Kushan emperor requested a marriage alliance with a Han princess and sent gifts to the Chinese court in expectation that this would occur. After the Han court refused, a Kushan army 70,000 strong marched on Ban Chao in 86 AD. The army was apparently exhausted by the time it reached its objective and was defeated by the Chinese force. The Kushanas retreated and later paid tribute to the Chinese emperor Han He (89–106).

In about 120 AD, Kushan troops installed Chenpan—a prince who had been sent as a hostage to them and had become a favorite of the Kushan Emperor—on the throne of Kashgar, thus expanding their power and influence in the Tarim Basin. There they introduced the Brahmi script, the Indian Prakrit language for administration, and Greco-Buddhist art, which developed into Serindian art.

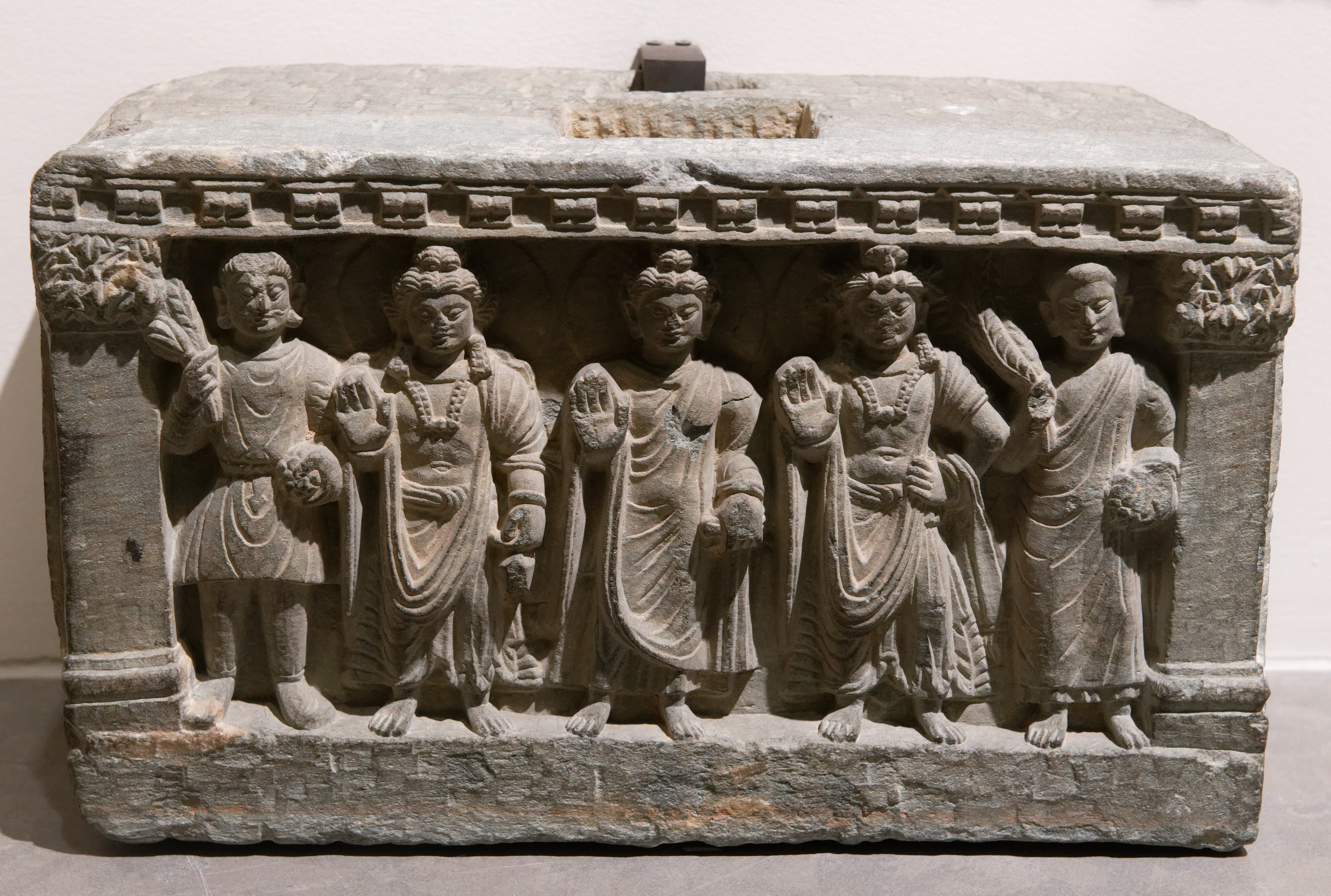
Buddhist art c. 300 AD, depicting (left to right) a Kushan lay Buddhist, Maitreya, Buddha, Avalokitesvara, and a Kushan Buddhist monk.

Following this territorial expansion, the Kushanas introduced Buddhism to northern and northeastern Asia, by both direct missionary efforts and the translation of Buddhist scriptures into Chinese. Major Kushan missionaries and translators included Lokaksema (born c. 147 CE) and Dharmaraksa (c. 233 – c. 311), both of whom were influential translators of the Mahayana sutras into Chinese. They went to China and established translation bureaus, thereby being at the center of the Silk Road transmission of Buddhism.

In the Records of the Three Kingdoms (chap. 3), it was recorded that in 229 AD, "The king of the Da Yuezhi [Kushanas], Bodiao 波調 (Vasudeva I), sent his envoy to present tribute, and His Majesty (Emperor Cao Rui) granted him the title of King of the Da Yuezhi Intimate with the Wei (Ch: 親魏大月氏王, Qīn Wèi Dà Yuèzhī Wáng)."

Soon afterwards, the military power of the Kushanas began to decline. The rival Sasanian Empire of Persia extended its dominion into Bactria during the reign of Ardashir I around 230 CE. The Sasanians also occupied neighboring Sogdia by 260 AD and made it into a satrapy.

During the course of the 3rd and 4th centuries, the Kushan Empire was divided and conquered by the Sasanians, the Hephthalite tribes from the north, and the Gupta and Yaudheya empires from India.

== Later references to the Lesser Yuezhi ==
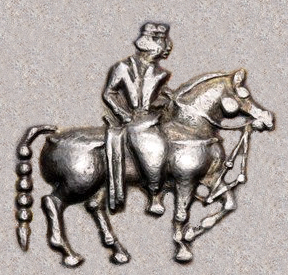
Yuezhi horseman on the coinage of Heraios.

Xiao Yuezhi refers to the less militarized Yuezhi who settled in northern China (following the migration of the Greater Yuezhi). The term is used of peoples in locations as diverse as Tibet, Qinghai, Shanxi and the Tarim Basin.

Some of the Lesser Yuezhi settled among the Qiang people of Huangzhong, Qinghai, according to archaeologist Sophia-Katrin Psarras. These people were referred to as the Huangzhong Yuezhi Hu (湟中月氏胡). After the Xiongnu were driven out, several hundred of the Yuezhi from Huangzhong moved back to Gansu and settled down in the region of Zhangye. The Yuezhi in Zhangye were employed by the Han as military auxiliaries, as so they became known as the Yicong Hu (義從胡) or "Loyal Nomad Auxiliary". The Yicong later mutinied with the Qiang against the Han dynasty and were a driving factor in the Liangzhou Rebellion (184–221 CE). In more recent scholarly discussions, another branch of Lesser Yuezhi have been theorized as the Lushui Hu (盧水胡) or "Lu River Nomad". The exact location of the Lu River is debated, though one suggestion is the Lu Creek (盧溪; east of modern Huangyuan County, Qinghai), a tributary of the Huangshui River. By the late Han and Three Kingdoms period, the Lushui Hu were widely distributed throughout northwestern China, but had heavily intermixed with the Xiongnu, Qiang and other minority ethnic groups in the region. The Juqu clan (沮渠), a Lushui Hu family from Zhangye, founded the Northern Liang dynasty (397–439 CE) during the Sixteen Kingdoms period and later briefly ruled over the oasis state of Gaochang in the Tarim Basin (442–460 CE).

Elements of the Lesser Yuezhi are said to have been part of the Jie people, who originated from Yushe County in Shanxi. Other theories link the Jie more strongly to the Xiongnu, Kangju, or the Tocharian-speaking peoples of the Tarim. Led by Shi Le (Emperor Ming of Later Zhao), the Jie people established the Later Zhao dynasty (319–351 CE). The Jie populations were later massacred by Ran Min of the short-lived Ran Wei dynasty during the fall of Later Zhao.

In Tibet, the Gar or mGar – a clan name associated with blacksmiths - may have been descended from the Lesser Yuezhi who resettled in Qiang in 162 BC.

A Chinese monk named Gao Juhui, who traveled from Kaifeng to Khotan in or about 938 CE, mentioned a people known in Chinese as Zhongyun (仲雲; Wade–Giles Tchong-yun), describing them as descendants of the Lesser Yuezhi. The Zhongyun were the founders of the city state of Cumuḍa (also Cimuda or Cunuda), south of Lop Nur in the eastern Tarim. (Following the subsequent settlement of Uyghur-speaking people in the area, Cumuḍa became known as Čungul, Xungul and Kumul. Under subsequent Han Chinese influence, it became known as Hami.)

Before the middle of the 1st millennium, the Xiao Yuezhi had ceased to be identifiable by that name and appear to have been subsumed by other ethnicities, including Tibetans, Uyghurs and Han.

== Proposed links to other groups ==
Sampul tapestry

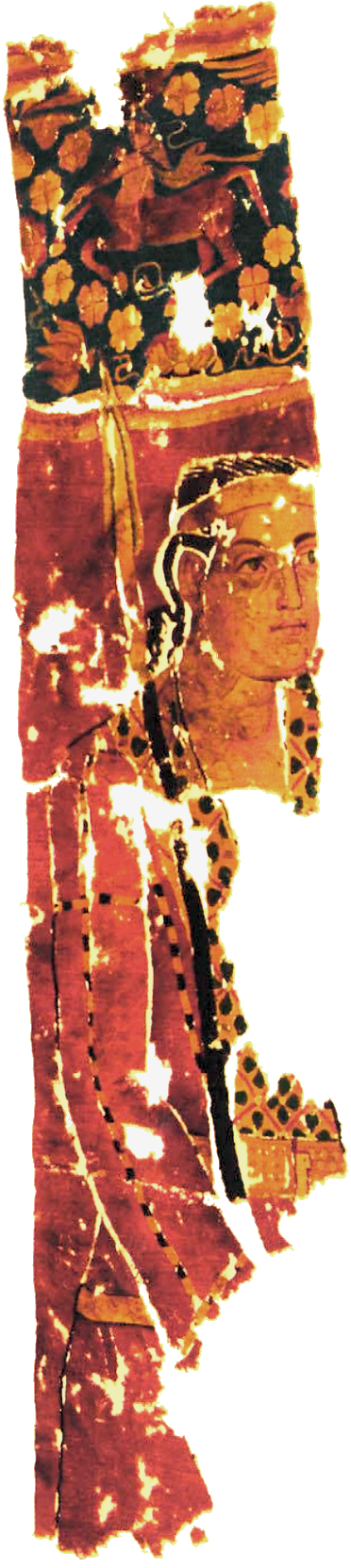
Full length

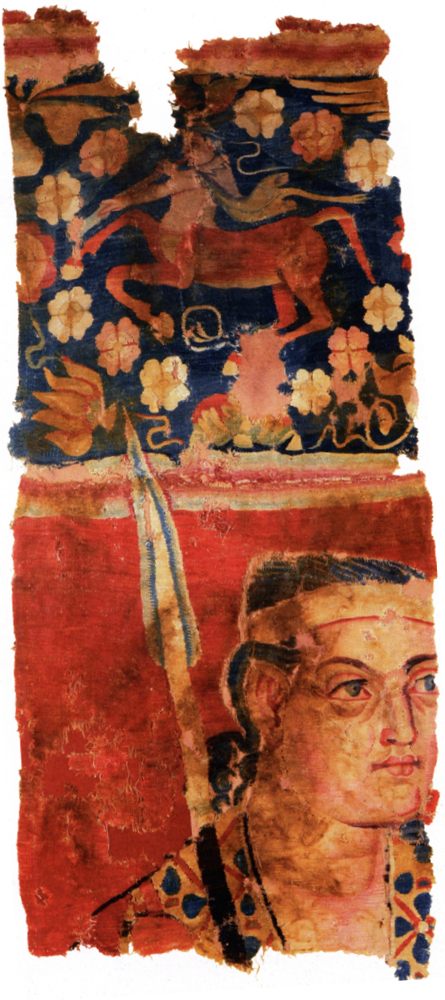
Detail

Probable Yuezhi soldier in red jacket and trousers, in the Sampul tapestry. Embroidered in Hellenistic style, with motif of a centaur, 1st century AD, Sampul, Ürümqi Xinjiang Region Museum.

The relationship between the Yuezhi and other Central Asian peoples is unclear. Based on claimed similarities of names, different scholars have linked them to several groups, but none of these identifications is widely accepted.

Mallory and Mair suggest that the Yuezhi and Wusun were among the nomadic peoples, at least some of whom spoke Iranian languages, who moved into northern Xinjiang from the Central Asian steppe in the 2nd millennium BC.

Scholars such as Edwin Pulleyblank, Josef Markwart, and László Torday, suggest that the name Iatioi—a Central Asian people mentioned by Ptolemy in Geography (AD 150)—may also be an attempt to render Yuezhi.

There has been only limited scholarly support for a theory developed by W. B. Henning, who proposed that the Yuezhi were descended from the Guti (or Gutians) and an associated, but little known tribe known as the Tukri, who were native to the Zagros Mountains (modern Iran and Iraq), during the mid-3rd millennium BC. In addition to phonological similarities between these names and *ŋʷjat-kje and Tukhāra, Henning pointed out that the Guti could have migrated from the Zagros to Gansu, by the time that the Yuezhi entered the historical record in China, during the 1st millennium BC. However, the only material evidence presented by Henning, namely similar ceramic ware, is generally considered to be far from conclusive.

Proposed links with the Aorsi, Asii, Getae, Goths, Gushi, Jats, Massagetae, and other groups have also gathered little support.

=== Yuezhi–Tocharian hypothesis ===
When manuscripts dating from the 6th to 8th centuries AD written in two hitherto unknown Indo-European languages were discovered in the northern Tarim Basin, the early 20th-century linguist Friedrich W. K. Müller identified them with the enigmatic "twγry ("Toγari") language" used to translate Indian Buddhist Sanskrit texts and mentioned as the source of an Old Turkic (Uyghur) manuscript.

Müller then proposed to connect the name "Toγari" (Togar/Tokar) to the Tókharoi people of Tokharistan (themselves associated with the Yuezhi) described in early Greek histories. He thus referred to the newly discovered languages as "Tocharian", which became the common name for both the languages of the Tarim manuscripts and the people who produced them. Most historians have been rejecting the identification of the Tocharians of the Tarim with the Tókharoi of Bactria, mainly because they are not known to have spoken any languages other than Bactrian, a quite dissimilar Eastern Iranian language. Other scholars suggest that the Yuezhi/Kushanas may previously have spoken Tocharian before shifting to Bactrian on their arrival in Bactria, an example of an invading or colonising elite adopting a local language (as also seen for the Greeks, the Turks or the Arabs upon their successive settlements in Bactria). However, while Tocharian contains some loanwords from Bactrian, there are no traces of Tocharian in Bactrian.

Another possible endonym of the Yuezhi was put forward by H. W. Bailey, who claimed that they were referred to, in 9th and 10th century Khotan Saka Iranian texts, as the Gara. According to Bailey, the Tu Gara ("Great Gara") were the Great Yuezhi. This is consistent with the Ancient Greek Τόχαροι Tokharoi (Latinised Tochari) in reference to the faction of the Kushans that conquered Bactria, as well as the Tibetan language name Gar (or mGar), for the members of the Lesser Yuezhi who settled in the Tibetan Empire.

Hakan Aydemir, assistant professor at Istanbul Medeniyet University, reconstructs the ethnonym *Arki ~ *Yarki which underlay Chinese transcriptions 月氏 (Note: Old Chinese *ŋwat-tēɦ ~[ŋ]ʷat-tēɦ) and 月支 (Note: Later Han Chinese *ŋyat-tśe) as well as various other foreign transcriptions and Tocharian A ethnonym Ārśi. Aydemir suggests that *Arki ~ *Yarki is etymologically Indo-European.

=== Nomadic artifacts in Gansu and Ningxia (5th–4th century BC) ===
Numerous nomadic artifacts are attributed to the areas of southern Ningxia and southeastern Gansu during the period of the 5th-4th century BC. They are quite similar to the works of the nomadic Ordos culture further east, and reflect strong Scythian influences. Some of these artifacts were sinicized by the neighbouring Qin state in China, probably also for nomadic consumption. Nomadic figures with long noses riding on a camel also appear regularly in southern Ningxia from the 4th century BC. Particularly, the Shajing culture (700–100 BCE) of Gansu has been proposed as a candidate for the origin of the Yuezhi.

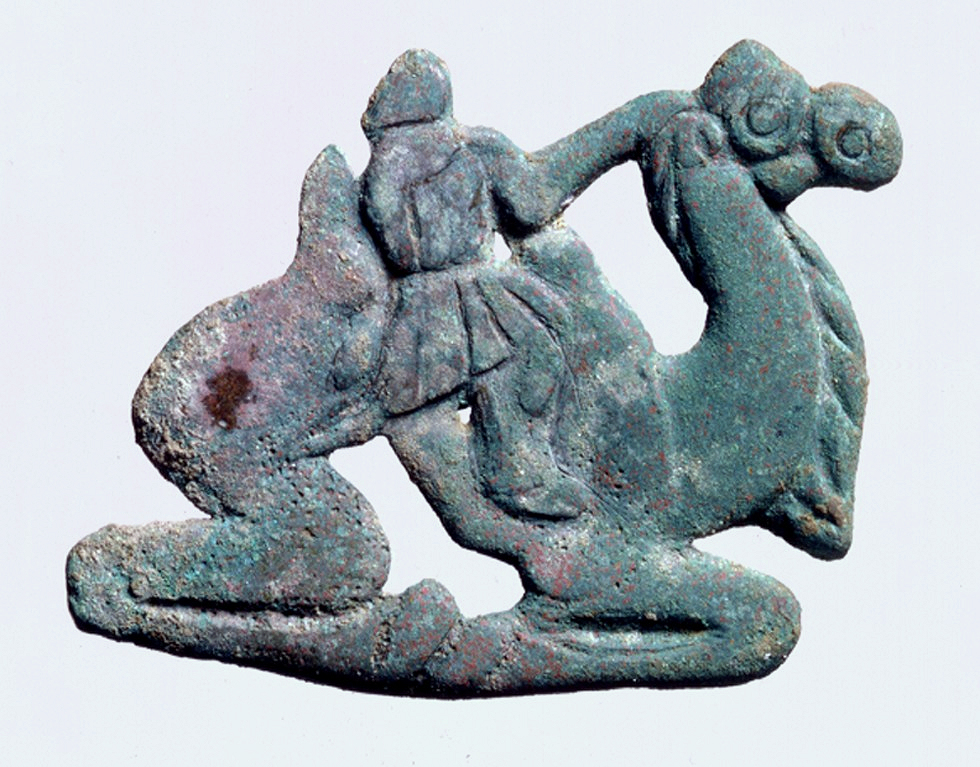
Nomadic figure, typically with a long nose, on a Bactrian camel. Southern Ningxia, 4th century BC.

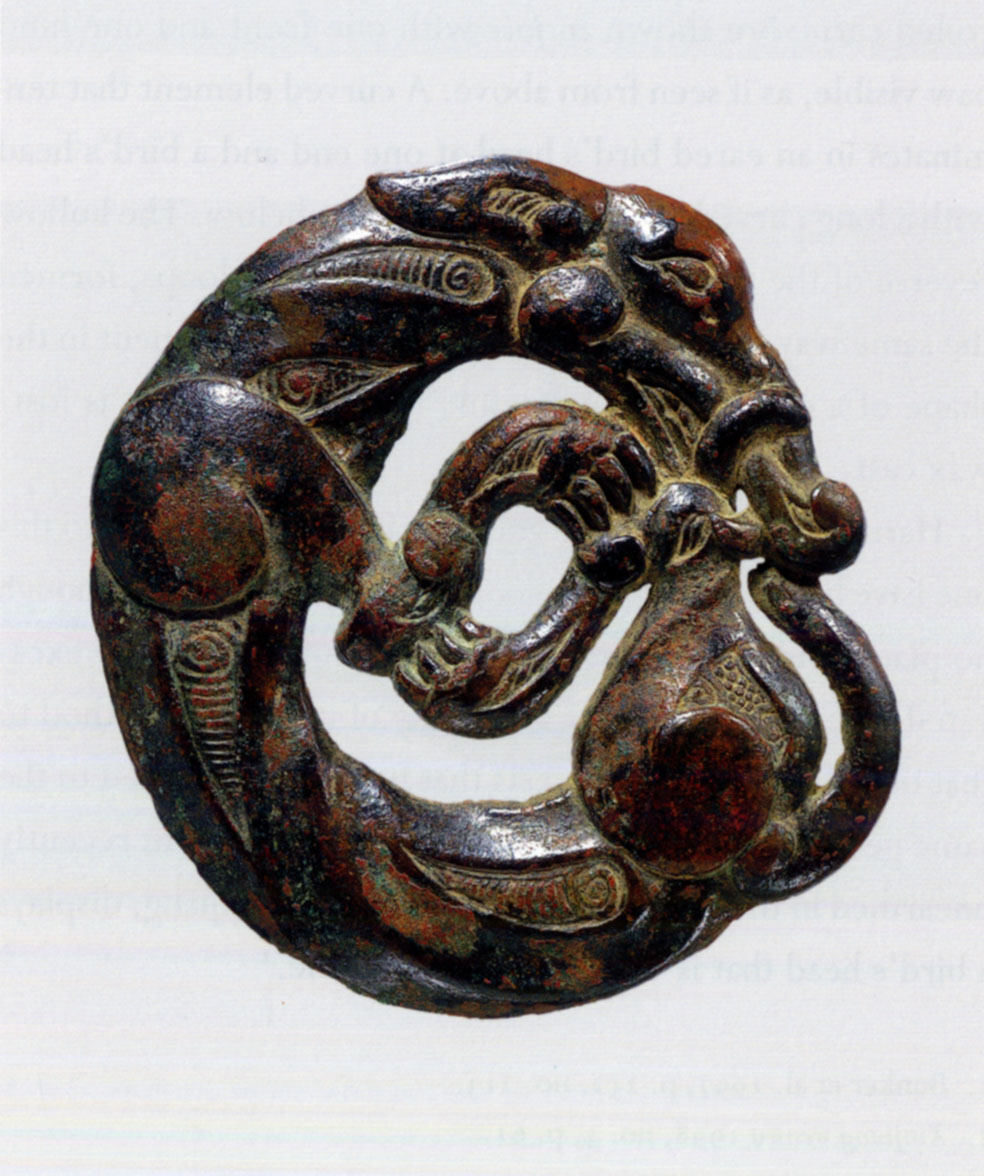
Harness ornament in the shape of a coiled wolf, characteristic of nomadic artifacts of southern Ningxia and southeastern Gansu, 5th-4th century BC.

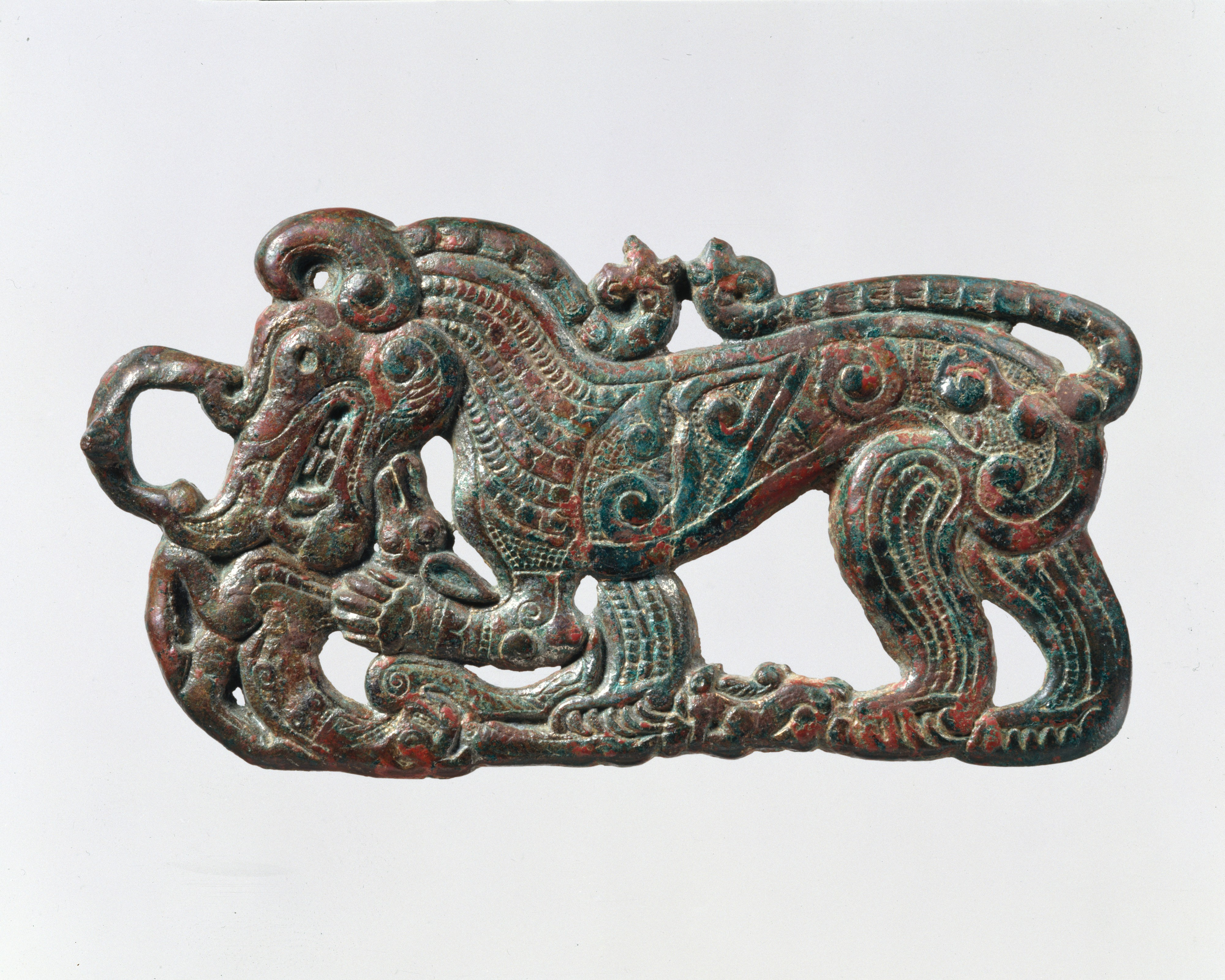
Belt plaque in the shape of a standing wolf, characteristic of nomadic artifacts of southern Ningxia and southeastern Gansu, and related to the Scythian styles of Pazyryk. 4th century BC.

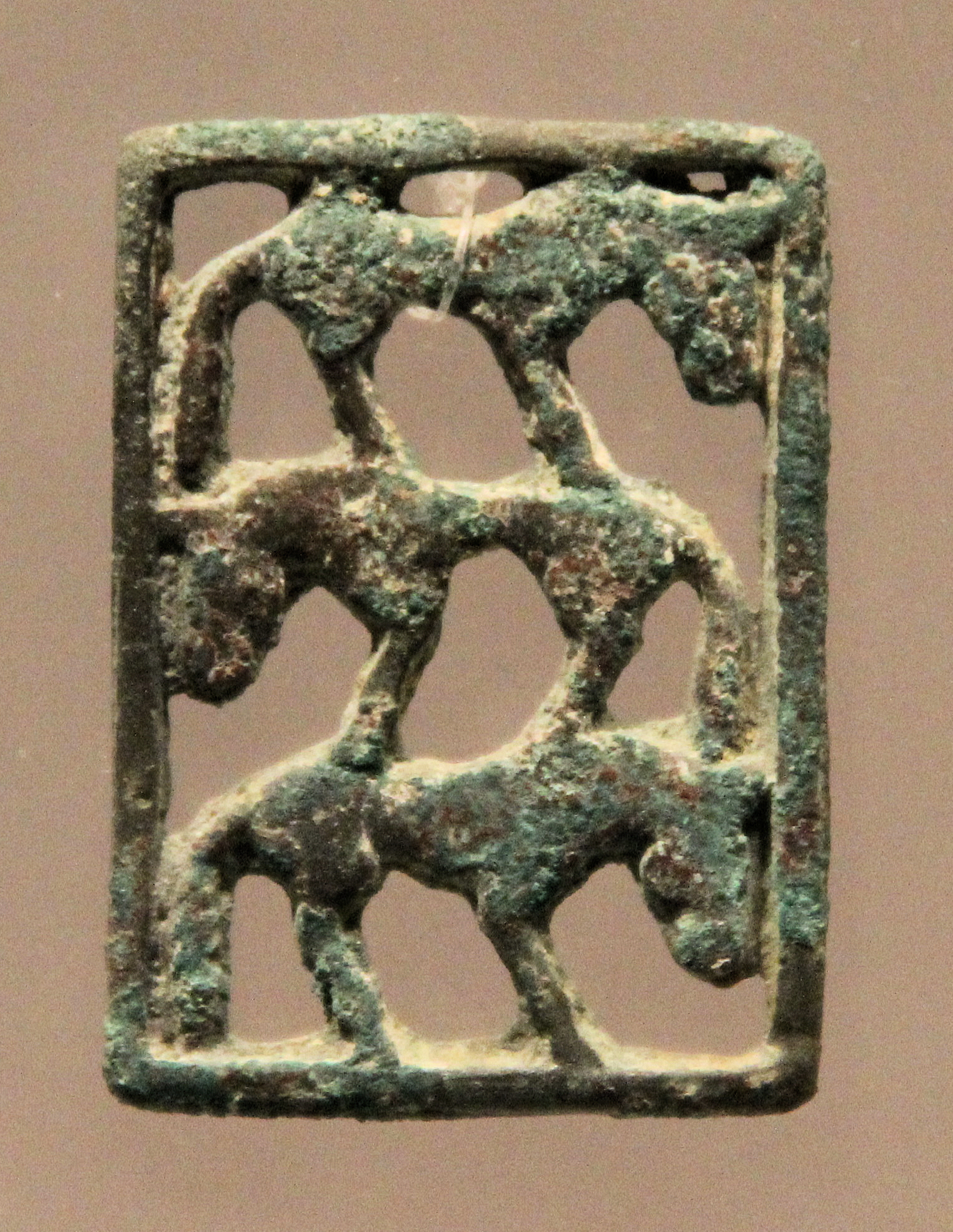
Bronze horse ornament (Shajing culture 700-100 BCE)

=== Shirenzigou culture ===
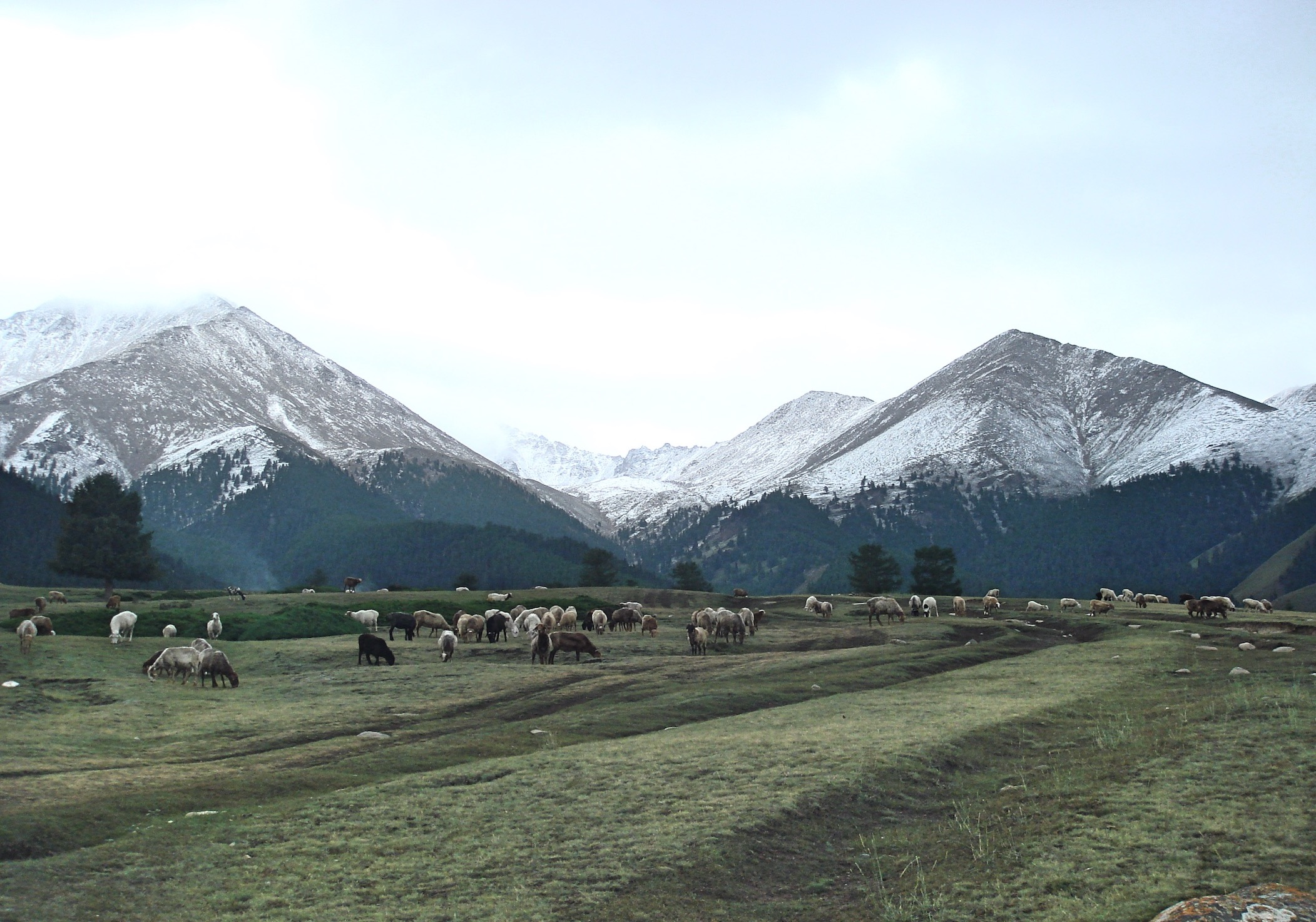
Surroundings of the Shirenzigou archaeological site in Barkol County.

Looking at the archaeological and genetic evidence, another area of origin on the northeastern border of the Tarim Basin has also been proposed: the Yuegongtai-Xiheigou (岳公台-西黑沟) archaeological sites, corresponding to the Shirenzigou culture and Barkol culture in the Barkol County of Xinjiang. This would have positioned the Yuezhi between the Subeshi culture to their west, the Yanbulaq culture to their east, the aftermaths of the Chemurchek culture to the north, and a wide desertical area to south about a thousand kilometers away from the Central Plains of China.

== See also ==
- Hephthalite
- History of Afghanistan
- History of Central Asia
- History of China
- History of India
- History of the central steppe
- Indo-Sassanids
- Indo-Scythians
- Iranians in China
- Pre-Islamic period of Afghanistan
