= Heraios =

Early 1st century CE Kushan ruler

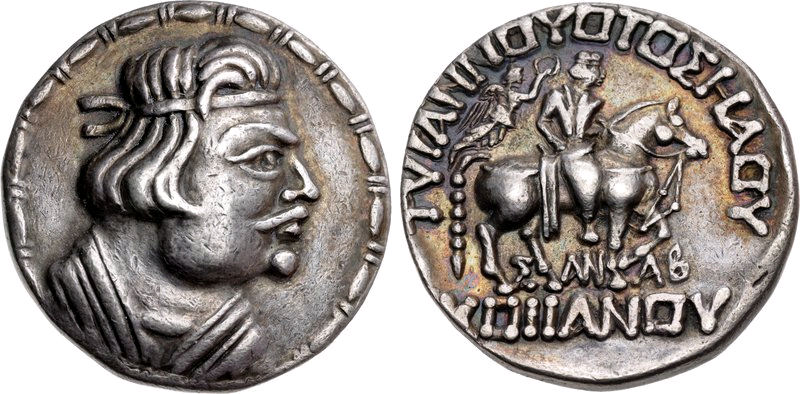
- Silver tetradrachm of Kushan king Heraios. Obv: Bust of Heraios, with Greek royal headband. Rev: Horse-mounted King, crowned with a wreath by the Greek goddess of victory Nike. Greek legend: ΤΥΡΑΝΝΟΥΟΤΟΣ ΗΛΟΥ - ΣΑΝΑΒ - ΚΟϷϷΑΝΟΥ "The Tyrant Heraios, Sanav (meaning unknown), of the Kushans".

Kushan ruler
- Reign: c. 1 –30 CE
- Coronation: 1 BCE
- Predecessor: Sapadbizes
- Successor: Kujula Kadphises
- Born: 23 BCE; Taskhand
- Died: 30 CE; Srinagar ?
- Issue: Kujula Kadphises,
Names
- Heraios Kadphises
- Dynasty: Kushan

Heraios (Bactrian: Ηλου Ēlou, sometimes Heraus, Heraos, Miaos) was apparently a king or clan chief of the Kushans (reign: c. 1 –30 CE), one of the five constituent tribes of the Yuezhi, in Bactria, in the early 1st century CE.

Several scholars question his existence as a separate historical figure and suggest that "Heraios" may have been another name for his nominal successor Kujula Kadphises. For example, numismatist Joe Cribb points out the similarity of coins minted by Kujula to those of a Greco-Bactrian predecessor named Hermaios Soter (or Hermaeus Soter). Moreover, some portraits of Kujula resemble Hermaios, suggesting that Kujula may have initially reused the design of coins issued during the reign of Hermaios Soter.

The coins bearing the name Heraios were silver and made in the Hellenistic style, using the Greek script. The reverse shows the winged Greek goddess of victory Nike holding out a wreath, over Heraios mounted on a horse. He wears a tunic and has a large bow on the side. Some portraits show Heraios with a marked artificial skull deformation, a characteristic of several Kushan portraits and sculptures of the 1st century CE. On some of the Heraios coins, his name has sometimes been read as ΗΛΟΥ or ΗΙΛΟΥ, which has been transliterated as "Ilou". However other readings of the same texts include "Ηaou" and "Ηiaou".

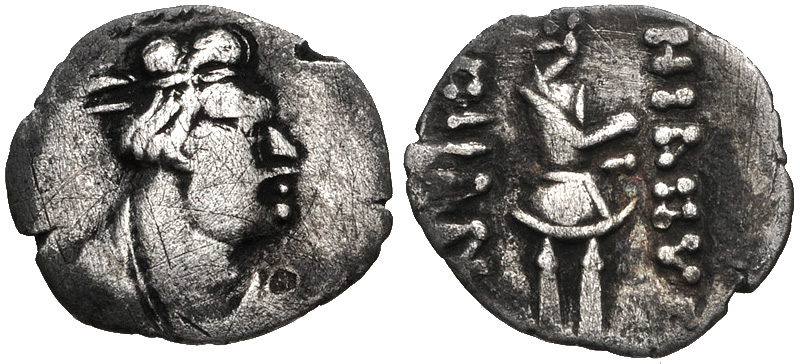
Another coin type of Heraois, c. 1- 30/50 CE

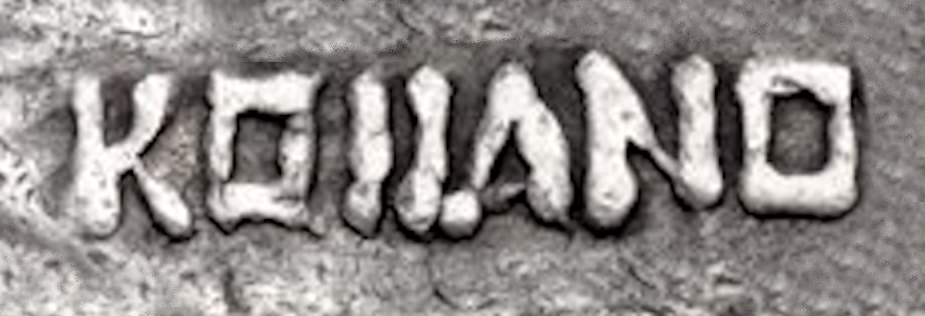
The ethnonym "KOϷϷANO" (Koshshano, "Kushans") in Greek alphabet (with the addition of the letter Ϸ, "Sh") on a coin of Heraios.

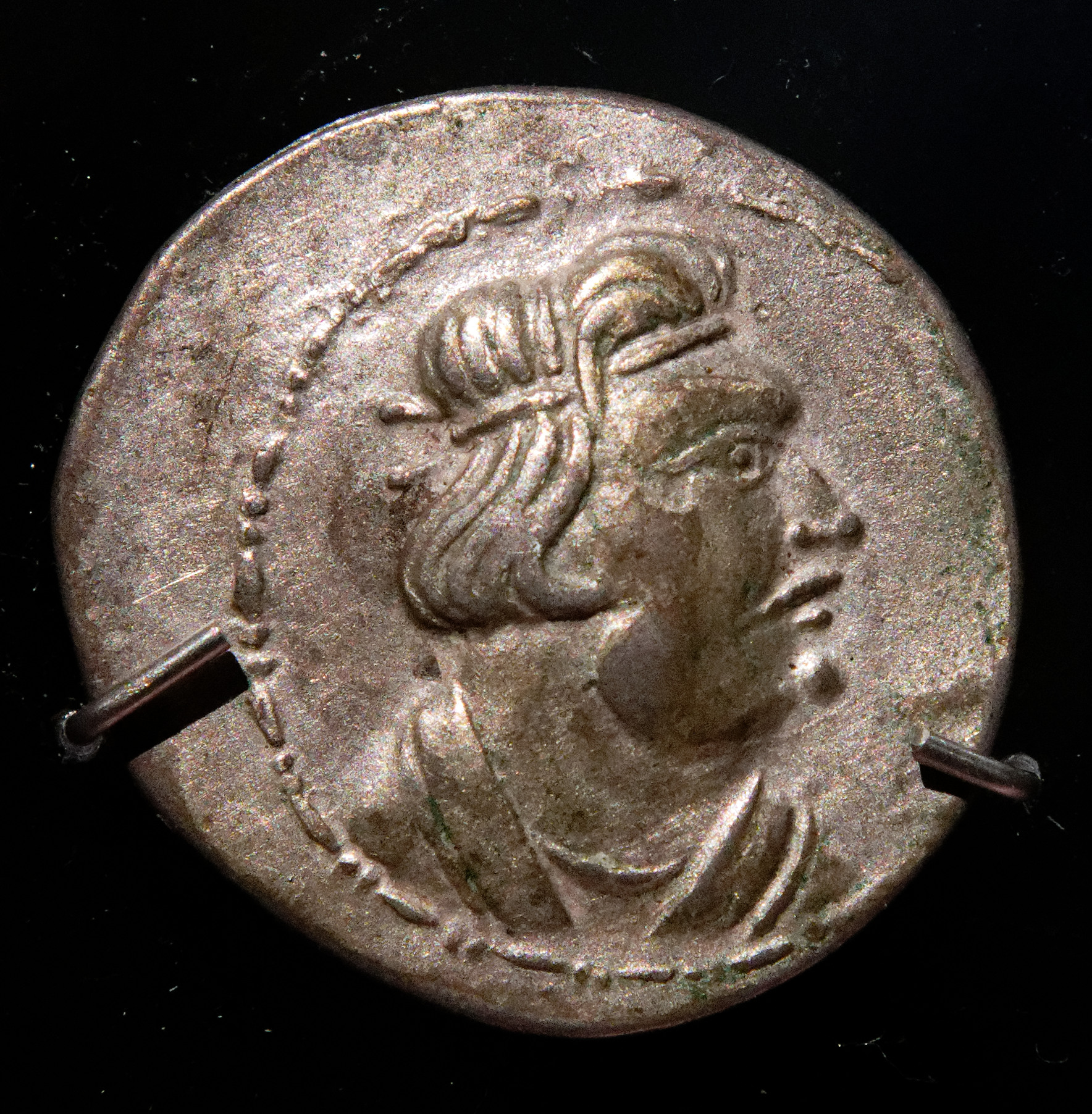
Tetradrachm, obverse: diademed Heraos right, 1st half of the 1st century CE. From Vakhsh, Tajikistan.

== Bibliography ==
- (en) E.A. Davidovitch, The First hoard of tetradrachmas of the Kuṣāṇa "Heraios.", AKADÉMIAI KIADÓ, BUDAPEST 1980, pages 147 - 177.

== Sources ==
- Rezakhani, Khodadad (2017). "East Iran in Late Antiquity". ReOrienting the Sasanians: East Iran in Late Antiquity. Edinburgh University Press. pp. 1–256. ISBN 9781474400305. JSTOR 10.3366/j.ctt1g04zr8. (registration required)
- Sinisi, Fabrizio (21 October 2022). "Again on "Heraios" Being Kujula and Some Related Problems". Electrum. 29: 87–107. doi:10.4467/20800909EL.22.007.15777.

| Preceded by Sapadbizes (as ruler in Bactria, Yuezhi) | Kushan Ruler; 1 – 30 CE | Succeeded by Kujula Kadphises |
