= Sapadbizes =

Late 1st century BC ruler of western Bactria

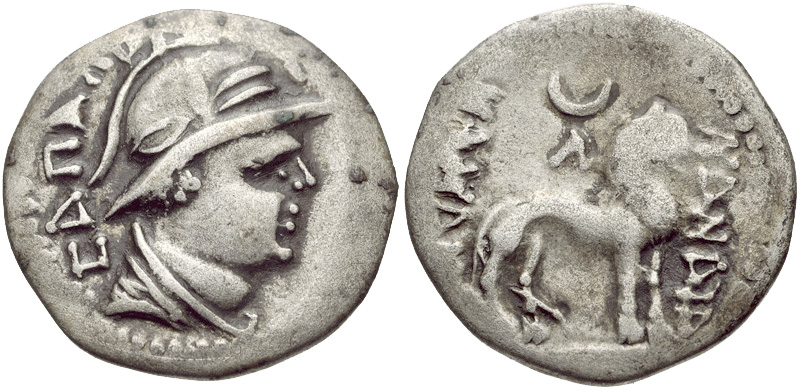
Coin of the first identifiable Yuezhi prince, Sapadbizes (c. 20-1 BC). Obv: Bust of Sapadbizes. Greek legend ϹΑΠΑΔΒΙΖΗϹ "Sapadbizes". Rev: Lion with Greek legend ΝΑΝΑΙΑ repeated left and right (Moon goddess). Tamgha of hill & crescent. Qunduz mint, in Afghanistan.

Sapadbizes (Σαπαδβιζης), also Sapalbizes or Sapaleizis, was a ruler of western Bactria, sometimes linked to the Yuezhi. He is known only from his coins, which are rather rare, and are dated to circa 20 BC - 20 AD. Two clues provide an approximate date for this ruler. He is believed to have overstruck the coins of Phraates IV of Parthia, secondly his coins are of good silver. This places him after Phraates IV (40 BC) and before the debasement of coinage in Northwest India (AD 20). He is not the only ruler of his dynasty known. Several other coins imply that Sapadbizes was preceded by at least one, and possibly two other rulers. It is likely that Sapadbizes and these other rulers were descendants of tribes who had invaded Bactria and imitated the coins of the last Greco-Bactrian kings. Though it is clear from the coins, and the evidence of Chinese chroniclers that at this time Sapadbizes was an ally or dependent of Parthia, nothing is known of the succession after Sapadbizes. However, scholars surmise that his kingdom was conquered by Kujula Kadphises, during the latter's war with Parthia, and absorbed into the Kushan Empire, probably about the year 30 AD.

A coin of Sapadbizes was discovered in the burial site of Tillya Tepe.

Preceded by Unknown Yuezhi rulers)	Yuezhi Ruler; 20 – 1 BCE	Succeeded by Heraios (as Kushan King)
