= Kumul Khanate =

Turco-Mongol khanate in the Qing dynasty

Kumul Khanate قۇمۇل خانلىقى 哈密札薩克旗
- 1696–1930
- Hami prefecture (red), location of the Kumul Khanate, in Xinjiang (orange) (modern borders shown)
- Status: Banner of the Qing dynasty (1696–1912); Vassal of the Republic of China (1912–1930)
- Capital: Kumul, Xinjiang
- Common languages: Turki (Chagatai language), Uyghur, Chinese language
- Religion: Sunni Islam
- Demonym: Kumulik
- Government: Monarchy
- Khan
  - 1867–1882: Muhammad Shah
  - 1882–1930: Maqsud Shah (last)
- Chancellor/Baig
  - 1922–1930: Yulbars Khan (last)
- History
  - Established: 1696
  - Disestablished: 1930
- Currency: Xinjiang coins
Preceded by	Succeeded by
Moghulistan	Xinjiang Province, Republic of China
- Today part of: China

The Kumul Khanate was a semi-autonomous feudal Turco-Mongol khanate (equivalent to a banner in Mongolia) within the Qing dynasty and then the Republic of China until it was abolished by Xinjiang governor Jin Shuren in 1930. The khanate was located in present-day Hami prefecture of Xinjiang.

The khans of Kumul were direct descendants of the khans of the Chagatai Khanate, and thus the last descendants of the Mongol Empire.

== History ==
The Ming dynasty established a tributary relationship with the Turpan Khanate (division of Moghulistan), that put end to Kara Del in 1513 after its conquest by Mansur Khan in the Ming–Turpan conflict. The khanate paid tribute to the Ming. The Turpan Khanate under Sultan Said Baba Khan supported Chinese Muslim Ming loyalists during the 1646 Milayin rebellion against the Qing dynasty.

Beginning in 1647, after the defeat of the Ming loyalists, during which the Kumul Prince Turumtay was killed at the hands of Qing forces, Kumul submitted to the Qing and sent tribute. It came under Qing rule and remained a khanate as a part of the Qing Empire. The title "Jasak Tarkhan" was granted to Abdullah Beg Tarkhan (son of Kumul ruler Muhammad Shah-i-Beg Tarkhan), ruler of Hami in 1696 after submitting to the Qing as a vassal during the Dzungar–Qing War.

The khanate had fought against the Dzungar Khanate for the Qing. Kumul continued as a vassal khanate when Xinjiang was changed into a province in 1884 after the Dungan revolt.

The khans also were given the title of Qinwang (Prince of the First Rank Chinese: 親王; pinyin: qīn wáng) by the Qing Empire. The khans were allowed enormous power by the Qing court, with the exception of administering execution, which had to be allowed by a Chinese official posted in Kumul. The khans were officially vassals to the emperor of China, and every six years were required to visit Beijing to be a servant to the emperor during a period of 40 days.

It was also known as the principality of Kumul, and the Chinese called it Hami. The khans were friendly to Chinese rule and authorities.

The khan Muhammad and his son and successor Khan Maqsud Shah heavily taxed his subjects and extorted forced labor, which resulted in two rebellions against his rule in 1907 and 1912.

The khan was assisted by a chancellor/vizer/chief minister in his court. The last khan, Maqsud Shah, had Yulbars Khan, the Prince of Hami, as his chancellor.

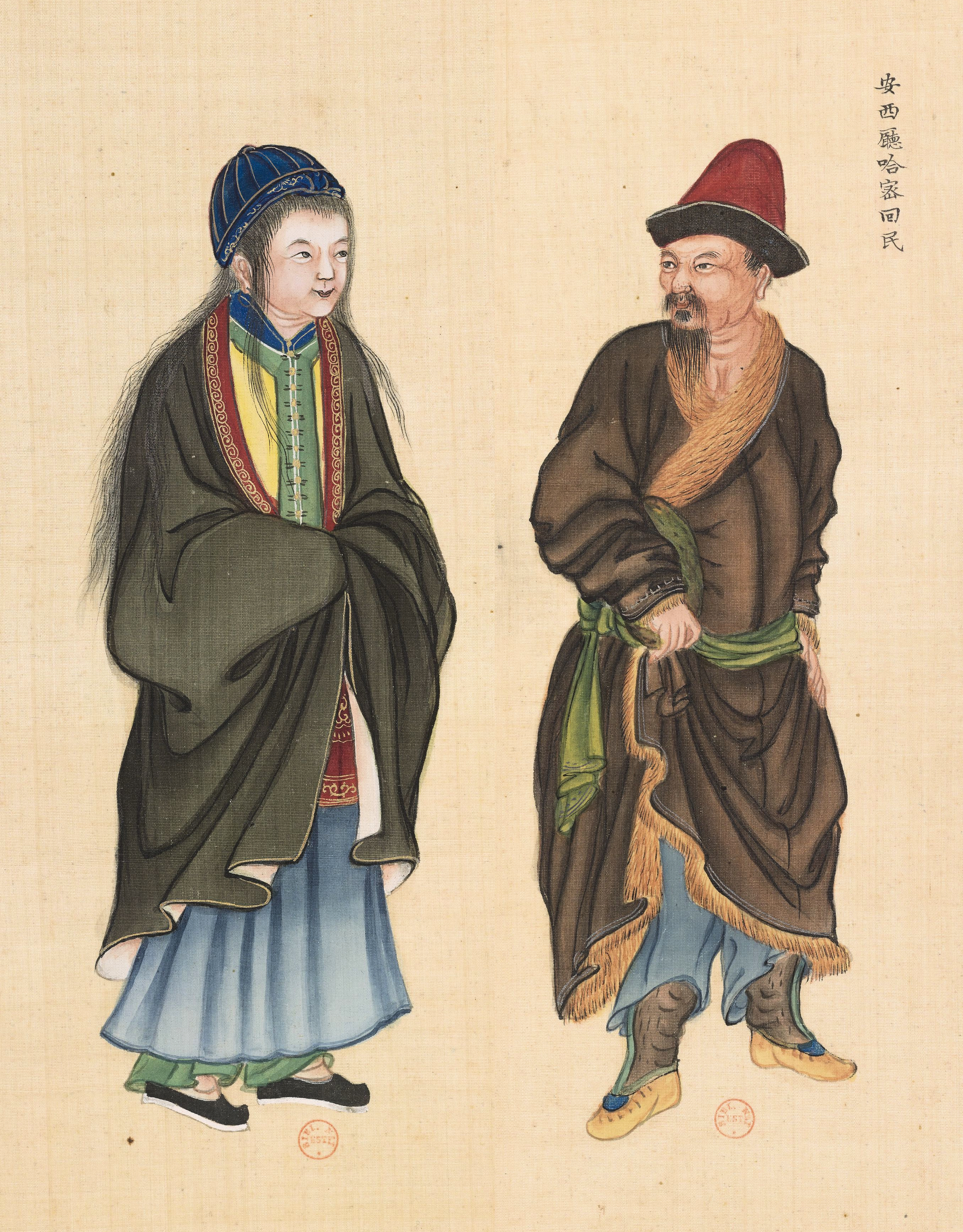
Uyghur people from Hami. Huang Qing Zhigong Tu, 1769

The khan paid a small annual tribute to Urumchi and in return Xinjiang government paid him a formal subsidy of 1,200 silver taels each year—no doubt in Yang Zengxin's opinion a small enough sum for ensuring the continued obedience of the strategically vital khanate.

The Han Chinese governor of Xinjiang, Yang Zengxin, was a monarchist and tolerated the khanate. He was friendly toward the khan Maqsud Shah.

Around the 1920s Japanese secret agents began exploring the Kumul area.

It was that the khanate existed which prevented the Uyghurs from rebelling, since the khanate represented a government where a man of their ethnicity and religion was reigning. The abolition of the khanate led to a bloody rebellion.

By 1928, shortly after the assassination of Yang Zengxin, it was estimated that the aging Maqsud Shah ruled over a population of between 25,000 and 30,000 Kumulliks. The khan was responsible for levying taxes and dispensing justice; his administration rested on twenty one Begs, four of whom were responsible for Kumul itself, five others being responsible for the plains villages and the remaining twelve administering the mountainous regions of the Barkul and Karlik Tagh. Maqsud Shah also maintained a Uyghur militia which was reputed to be better trained than its counterpart in the predominantly Chinese Old City. The soil of the oasis was rich and well-cultivated, and the conditions of the Kumulliks before 1929 was one of relative contentment and prosperity. According to British missionaries Mildred Cable and Francesca French, both of whom knew Maqsud Shah personally, the continued existence of the Khanate of Kumul was also of psychological importance to the Uyghurs of Turfan and the Tarim Basin, who were tolerant to Chinese rule so long as their own seat of the government was firmly established at Hami under Khan Maqsud Shah who still hold the proud title of King of the Gobi.

Upon Maqsud Shah's death on 6 June 1930 Jin Shuren replaced the khanate with three normal provincial administrative districts Hami, Yihe, and Yiwu. This set off the Kumul Rebellion, in which Yulbars Khan attempted to restore the heir Nasir to the throne.

== List of khans ==
The list of the Kumul Khanate khans is as follows:

Generation	Name	Reign years	information
1st generation	Abdullah Beg 額貝都拉 é-bèi-dōu-lā	1697–1709	In the 36th year of Kangxi's reign, he was granted the title of Jasagh Darhan of the First Rank. He died in the 48th year of Kangxi's reign.
2nd generation	郭帕 guō-pà, Gapur Beg	1709–1711	Abdullah Beg's eldest son. In the 48th year of Kangxi's reign he was granted the title of Jasagh Darhan of the First Rank. He died in the fiftieth year of Kangxi's reign.
3rd generation	Emin 額敏 É-mǐn	1711–1740	Gapur beg's eldest son. In the fiftieth year of Kangxi's reign he inherited the title of Jasagh Darhan of the First Rank. In the fifth year of Yongzheng's reign he was promoted to Zhenguo Gong (鎮國公; Duke Who Guards the State); in the 7th year of Yongzheng's reign, he was promoted to Gushan Beizi (固山貝子; Banner Prince). In the 5th year of Qianlong's reign he died.
4th generation	Yusuf 玉素甫 Yù-sù-fǔ or Yusup 玉素卜yù sù bǔ	1740–1767	Emin's eldest son. In the fifth year of Qianlong's reign he inherited the title of Jasagh Zhenguo Gong. In the 10th year of Qianlong's reign he was promoted to Gushan Beizi. In the 23rd year of Qianlong's reign he was granted the title of Beile pinji (貝勒品級). In the 24th year of Qianlong's reign, he was conferred the title of Duoluo Beile (多羅貝勒), and conferred the title of Junwang pinji (郡王品級). He died in the 12th month of the 31st year (January 1767).
5th generation	Ishaq 伊薩克 yī-sà-kè	1767–1780	Yusuf's second son. In the 32nd year of Qianlong's reign he inherited the title of Junwang pinji Jasagh Duoluo Beile. In the 45th year he died.
6th generation	Ardashir 額爾德錫爾 é-Ěr-dé-xī-ěr	1780–1813	Ishaq's eldest son. In the 45th year of Qianlong's reign, he inherited the title of Junwang pinji Jasagh duoluo beile. In the 48th year by imperial order he was granted permanent succession (all his descendants would automatically inherit his title). In the 18th year of the Jiaqing Emperor he died.
7th generation	Bashir 博錫爾 bó-xī-ěr	1813–1867	Son of é-Ěr-dé-xī-ěr. In the 18th year of Jiaqing's reign, he inherited (his father's titles). In the 12th year of Daoguang's reign, he was promoted to Duoluo Junwang 多羅郡王. In the third year of Xianfeng's reign, he was granted the title of Qinwang 親王. In the fifth year of Tongzhi's reign, the Dungan revolt broke out, but he stayed loyal (to the Qing). In the sixth year of Tongzhi's reign, he was posthumously granted the title of Hezhuo Qinwang 和碩親王.
8th generation	Muhammad 賣哈莫特 mài-hǎ-mò-tè	1867–1882	Son of bó-xī-ěr. In the sixth year of Tongzhi's reign he inherited the title of Jasagh Heshuo Qinwang. In the seventh year of Guangxu's reign, he died, leaving no one to succeed to his title.
9th generation	Maqsud Shah Maqsud Shah 沙木胡索特 shā-mù-hú-suǒ-tè	1882–1930	Muhammad's agnatic nephew. In the eighth year of Guangxu's reign he inherited his titles. In the fourth year of the Republic of China, his salary as qinwang was doubled. In the 19th year of the Republic of China on the sixth month on the sixth day, he died of illness.
10th generation	Nasir 聶滋爾 niè-zī-ěr	1930–1934	Maqsud Shah's second son. In the 19th year of the Republic of China on the 9th month on the 13th day he inherited his titles. In the 23rd year of the republic he died.
11th generation	Bashir 伯錫爾 bó-xī-ěr	1934–1949	Nasir's eldest son. In the 23rd year of the republic on the fourth month he inherited his titles. He was arrested and sent to prison. In 1951 he died while in prison.

== See also ==
- Turkic peoples
- Qing dynasty in Inner Asia
