= Yulbars Khan =

Uyghur chieftain and general (1889–1971)

- يولۋاس خان
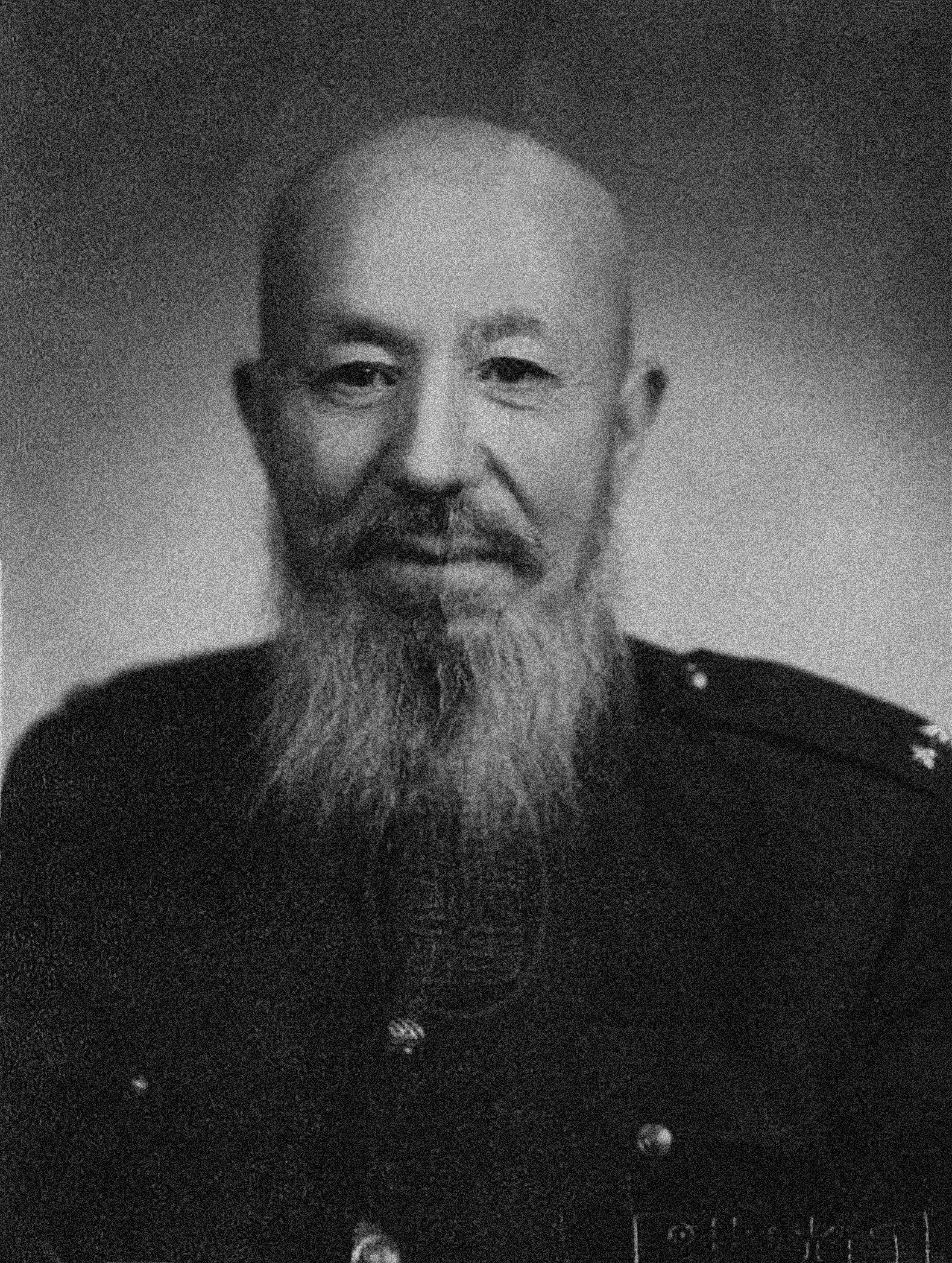

Governor of Xinjiang Province (Claimed by the Republic of China) in exile in Taiwan
- In office April 11, 1950 – July 27, 1971
- Preceded by: Burhan Shahidi
- Succeeded by: Vacant

Chancellor of the Kumul Khanate (Head of the Council of 12 Begs)
- In office 1922–1930

Personal details
- Born: 13 August 1889 Yangi Hissar, Xinjiang, Qing China
- Died: 27 July 1971 (aged 81) Taipei, Taiwan
- Party: Kuomintang
- Spouse: 2 Wives
- Children: Yaqub Beg; Niyas
- Nickname: "Tiger Prince" of Hami

Military service
- Allegiance: Republic of China
- Branch/service: National Revolutionary Army
- Years of service: 1944–1951
- Rank: General
- Battles/wars: Chinese Civil War; Kumul Rebellion; Ili Rebellion; Battle of Yiwu; Kuomintang Islamic Insurgency in China (1950–1958)

Chinese name
- Traditional Chinese: 堯樂博斯·汗
- Simplified Chinese: 尧乐博斯·汗
Transcriptions
Standard Mandarin
- Hanyu Pinyin: Yáolèbósī Hàn

Alternate spelling
- Traditional Chinese: 堯樂博士
- Simplified Chinese: 尧乐博士
Transcriptions
Standard Mandarin
- Hanyu Pinyin: Yáolèbóshì

Courtesy name
- Traditional Chinese: 黃景福
- Simplified Chinese: 黄景福
Transcriptions
Standard Mandarin
- Hanyu Pinyin: Huáng Jǐngfú

Uyghur name
- Uyghur: يولۋاس خان
- Literal meaning: Tiger Prince
Transcriptions
- Latin Yëziqi: Yolwas Xan

Yulbars Khan (Uyghur: يولۋاس خان, lit. 'Tiger Prince'; Chinese: 堯樂博斯·汗 or 堯樂博士; 13 August 1889 – 27 July 1971), courtesy name Huang Jingfu (Chinese: 黃景福), was an Uyghur chieftain and Kuomintang general during the Chinese Civil War. He entered service in the Kumul Khanate of Muhammad Khan of Kumul and later served under Muhammad's son Maksud Shah. He served as an advisor at the court, until when Maksud died in March 1930, governor Jin Shuren abolished the khanate. Yulbars then conspired with Khoja Niyaz and Ma Zhongying to overthrow Jin in the Kumul Rebellion. According to some people, Ma restrained Yulbars from traveling to Nanking to ask the Kuomintang for help, Ma earlier had an agreement with the Kuomintang that if he seized Xinjiang, he would be recognized by the Kuomintang as its leader.

Jin was eventually ousted by Sheng Shicai on 12 April 1933, who seized control of the province from 1934 to 1937. On 4 June 1933 Khoja Niyaz concluded a peace agreement with Sheng Shicai in Jimsar under mediation of newly appointed Soviet Consul-General in Urumchi, Garegin Apressof, a close associate of Joseph Stalin, and agreed to turn his Uyghur forces against general Ma Zhongying in exchange for granting control over Southern Xinjiang (Kashgaria or Tarim Basin), which already was lost by the Chinese and where a bloody power struggle between different rebel forces was occurring, also over Turpan Basin and Kumul Region, which was occupied by Ma Zhongying's forces.

All territory south of Tengritagh Mountains was granted the "autonomous status" inside of Xinjiang Province, the Chinese promised in agreement not to cross Tengritagh. Yulbars Khan disagreed with Khoja Niyaz in this decision and remained an ally of Ma Zhongying, who appointed him to be the Chief of Procurement Department of Kuomintang (KMT) 36th Division. In the summer of 1934, after retreating of Ma to the Southern Xinjiang and his following interning on Soviet territory on 7 July 1934, Yulbars Khan managed to conclude peace agreement with Sheng Shicai and was left as commander of Uyghur regiment in Kumul and also given high post of Commissioner for Reconstruction Affairs in Xinjiang Provincial Government. In May 1937, after the 6th Uyghur Division and 36th Tungan Division mutinied against the Xinjiang Provincial Government in Southern Xinjiang, rebels in Kashgaria appealed to Yulbars Khan to cut off communications between Xinjiang and China from his base in Kumul. During suppression of the rebellion by Sheng Shicai with Soviet military support (which included 5,000 Soviet intervention troops, airplanes and tanks BT-7) in summer 1937 he fled to Nanjing and returned to Kumul in 1946.

He led Chinese Muslim cavalry and White Russians against People's Liberation Army (PLA) forces taking over Xinjiang in 1949. He fought at the Battle of Yiwu. In 1951, after most of his troops deserted, he fled to Calcutta in India via Tibet, where his men were attacked by the Dalai Lama's forces. He then took a steamer to Taiwan. The KMT government then appointed him Governor of Xinjiang in absentia, which he held until he died in 1971 in Taiwan. He was also the last person to officially hold that title. In 1969, his memoirs (Chinese: 堯樂博士回憶錄; pinyin: Yáolè bóshì huíyìlù) were released.

Yulbars Khan was declared a traitor by Uyghur figures in the East Turkestan Independence Movement like Muhammad Amin Bughra and Isa Yusuf Alptekin for siding with Chiang Kai-shek and the Kuomintang, who continued to claim Xinjiang as a part of the Republic of China.
