= Maqsud Shah =

Maqsud Shah مقصود شاه
- Khan of the Kumul Khanate

Khan of the Kumul Khanate
- Reign: c. 1882 – 6 June 1930
- Predecessor: Muhammad Shah
- Successor: (Position abolished) Nasir Shah as Titular Khan
- Born: c. 1864; Kumul Khanate
- Died: 6 June 1930 (aged around 65–66); Kumul Khanate
- Issue: Nasir Shah; A daughter
- House: Chagatai
- Father: Sehzade Ahmad Khan
- Religion: Sunni Islam

Maqsud Shah (Note: Chagatai and Persian: مقصود شاه) (c. 1864–1930) was the Uyghur Jasagh Prince (Qinwang) of the Kumul Khanate in China from 1882 to 1930. He was the final ruler from the Borjigid dynasty.

== Reign ==
Maqsud Shah succeeded his uncle Muhammad Shah in 1882 as ruler of the Kumul Khanate. The Khans were officially vassals of the Qing Dynasty, and every six years were required to visit Beijing to be a servant to the Emperor for a period of 40 days. Unlike the rest of Xinjiang which was subjected to state-encouraged settlement, the Kumul Khanate was not opened to settlement by Han Chinese. He sent melons as tribute to the Emperor.

Maqsud spoke Turkic in a Chinese accent and often wore Chinese clothing, and also spoke fluent Chinese. He reputedly drank copious amounts of alcohol and did not allow anyone to take pictures of him.

Twenty one Begs administered Kumul under the Khan, and he received 1,200 taels in silver from the Xinjiang government after he sent tribute.

In 1912, the Qing Dynasty was overthrown in the Xinhai Revolution and replaced by the Republic of China, which promptly appointed Yang Zengxin as the new Governor of Xinjiang. Yang was a monarchist and supported the Khanate and as a result the Khanate's status as a vassal was undisturbed.

When Yang Zengxin was assassinated in 1928, the warlord governor Jin Shuren succeeded him as the governor of Xinjiang, whose period of rule was marked by strife, corruption, and ethnic intolerance.

Upon Maqsud Shah's death in 1930 Governor Jin Shuren replaced the Khanate with the three provincial administrative districts of Hami, Yihe, and Yiwu. Maqsud Shah's son and designated heir Nasir was not permitted to succeed him to the throne, and the succeeding events set off the Kumul Rebellion with the assistance of Yulbars Khan, who served as Maqsud's chancellor at court.

== Genealogy ==
Genealogy of Maqsud Ahmad Khan
1. Genghis Khan; 2. Chaghatai Khan; 3. Mutukan; 4. Yesünto'a; 5. Ghiyas-ud-din Baraq; 6. Duwa; 7. Esen Buqa I 8. Tughlugh Timur; 9. Khizr Khoja; 10. Muhammad Khan	11. Shir Ali Oglan; 12. Uwais Khan; 13. Yunus Khan; 14. Ahmad Alaq; 15. Sultan Said Khan; 16. Abdurashid Khan; 17. Muhammad Sultan; 18. Shudja ad Din Ahmad Khan; 19. Sultan Timur Khan; 20. Sultan Ahmad Pulat Khan	21. Emir Muhammad Shah-i-Beg Tarkhan; 22. Abdullah Beg Khan; 23. Gapur Beg Khan; 24. Emin Khan; 25. Yusuf Khan; 26. Ishaq Khan; 27. Ardashir Khan; 28. Bashir Khan; 29. Sehzade Ahmad Khan; 30. Maqsud Khan
