= Barkol Kazakh Autonomous County =

Barkol County 巴里坤县 (Chinese) باركول اۋدانى (Kazakh) باركۆل ناھىيىسى (Uyghur) Barkul, Balikul
- Autonomous county
- Barkol Kazak Autonomous County 巴里坤哈萨克自治县; Баркөл Қазақ автономиялық ауданы باركول قازاق اۆتونوميالىق اۋدانى; Barköl Qazaq autonomialyq audany باركۆل قازاق ئاپتونوم ناھىيىسى
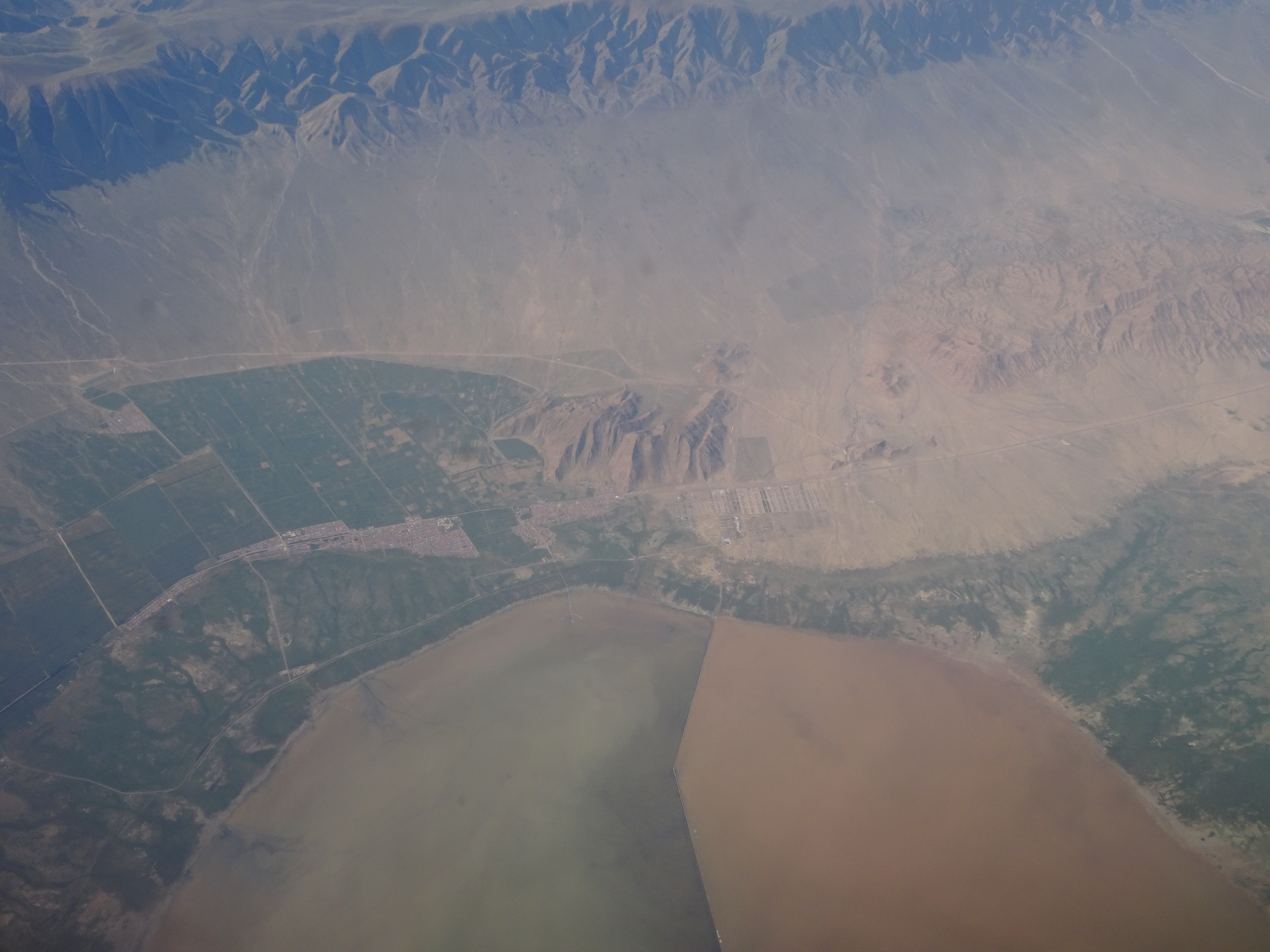

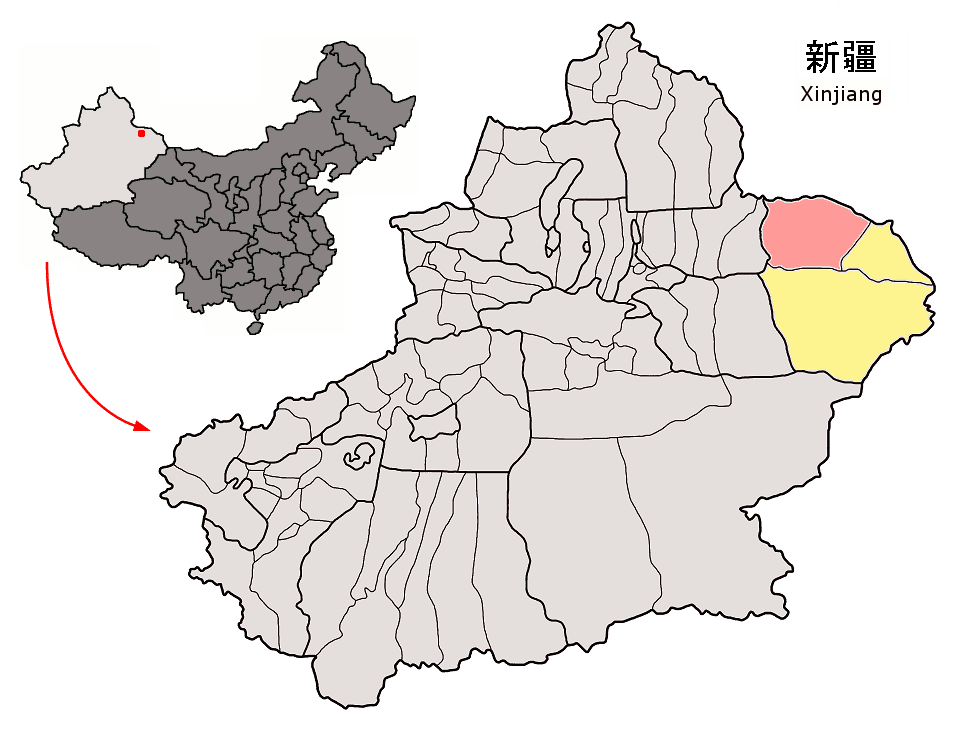
- Location of Barköl County (red) within Hami City (yellow) and Xinjiang

- Location of the district centre in Xinjiang Barkol County (China)
- Coordinates: 43°35′56″N 93°01′01″E
- Country: China
- Autonomous region: Xinjiang
- Prefecture-level city: Hami
- County seat: Barköl Town

Area
  - Total: 36,608 km^{2} (14,134 sq mi)

Population (2020)
  - Total: 65,531
  - Density: 1.7901/km^{2} (4.6363/sq mi)
- Time zone: UTC+8 (China Standard (Note: Locals in Xinjiang frequently observe UTC+6 (Xinjiang Time), 2 hours behind Beijing.))
- Website: www.xjblk.gov.cn

Barkol Kazakh Autonomous County (sometimes Barkul or Balikul in English) is a part of Hami Prefecture in Xinjiang and has an area of 38,445.3 km^{2} (14,843.8 sq mi). It forms part of the China–Mongolia border (bordering the Mongolian provinces of Khovd and Govi-Altai) on the county's north, while bordering Yizhou District to the south, Yiwu County to the east and Changji's Mori Kazakh Autonomous County to the west.

Barkol was made an autonomous county on October 1, 1954. It is noted for camel breeding and horse breeding with the Barkol horse well known throughout China. Due to the large number of camels, which is unparalleled in China, the county is nicknamed the "county of ten thousand camels".

== History ==
Barkol was a territory of Pulei country in ancient times. During the continuous Han–Xiongnu War, in 72 BC, Emperor Xuan of Han sent Zhao Chongguo as general of Pulei, together with Wusun to attack the Huns. After the Northern Wei dynasty, Rouran and Gaoche competed for the Pule grassland for a long time. Under Emperor Zhongzong of Tang in 710, 3,000 Yiwu troops were sent to build a city in Ganluchuan (now the ancient city of Dahe, located in Dongtouqu Village, Dahe Town, Balikun). In the Yuan dynasty, it belonged to the eastern border of Bechbaliq Province, and was originally called Barkule. In the Ming dynasty, it belonged to the Oirat Heshuo Special Department. In 1697 during the Qing dynasty, it was annexed to Hami, and in the 1731, the city of Barkule was built, and Anxi Tongzhi was established. In 1760, the Barkun Zhili Hall was built. In 1762, Barkol set up the Admiral's House. In 1764, it was changed to the town standard of Barkol. In 1772, a military city was built in Barkol. In 1773, Zhenxi House was established. Barkol was the regional command center for the pacification of the Dzungar in the early Qing dynasty. After the establishment of Dihua City, the status of Barkol was replaced by it. In 1855, the government was changed to Zhili Hall in the west of the town. In the 1874, Zuo Zongtang smashed Agubai, and took the town west as the army's military station and grain station. A large number of people from Shaanxi and Gansu moved to the west of the town, and the west of the town gradually became an important military town. After 1883, Kazakh herdsmen from Altay and other places moved in one after another. In 1913, the office was withdrawn and Zhenxi County was established. In 1934, it was placed under the Hami Administrative Region. At the beginning of 1954, the name of Barkol County was restored, and then the Barkol Kazakh Autonomous Region was established to implement regional autonomy and belong to Hami County. In 1955, the Barkol Kazakh Autonomous Region was changed to Barkol Kazakh Autonomous County. In October 2017, Barkol Kazakh Autonomous County officially withdrew from China's national poverty-stricken county.

== Administrative divisions ==
Barkol Kazakh Autonomous County is divided into five towns, seven townships, and four other township-level divisions.

Name	Simplified Chinese	Hanyu Pinyin	Uyghur (UEY)	Uyghur Latin (ULY)	Kazakh (Arabic script)	Kazakh (Latin and Cyrillic script)	Administrative division code
Towns
Barköl	巴里坤镇	Bālǐkūn Zhèn	باركۆل بازىرى	barköl baziri	باركول قالاشىعى	Barköl qalaşyğy Баркөл қалашығы	650521100
Bo'erqiangji	博尔羌吉镇	Bó'ěrqiāngjí Zhèn	بورچۇنجى بازىرى	borchunji baziri	بورشونجى قالاشىعى	Borşonjy qalaşyğy Боршонжы қалашығы	650521101
Dahe	大河镇	Dàhé Zhèn	داخې بازىرى	Daxë baziri	داحى قالاشىعى	Dahy qalaşyğy Дахы қалашығы	650521102
Kuisu	奎苏镇	Kuísū Zhèn	كۇيسۇ بازىرى	kuysu baziri	كۇيسۋ قالاشىعى	Qüisu qalaşyğy Күйсу қалашығы	650521103
Santanghu	三塘湖镇	Sāntánghú Zhèn	سەنتاڭخۇ بازىرى	sentangxu baziri	سانتاڭحۋ قالاشىعى	Santañhu qalaşyğy Сантаңху қалашығы	650521104
Townships
Sa'erqiaoke Township	萨尔乔克乡	Sà'ěrqiáokè Xiāng	سارچوقا يېزىسى	sarchoqa yëzisi	سارشوقى اۋىلى	Sarşoqy auyly Саршоқы ауылы	650521200
Haiziyan Township	海子沿乡	Hǎizǐyán Xiāng	كۆلياقا يېزىسى	kölyaqa yëzisi	كولبويى اۋىلى	Kölboiy auyly Көлбойы ауылы	650521201
Xiaolaoba Township	下涝坝乡	Xiàlàobà Xiāng	شيالوبا يېزىسى	shyaloba yëzisi	شيالاۋبا اۋىلى	Şialauba auyly Шялауба ауылы	650521202
Shirenzi Township	石人子乡	Shírénzǐ Xiāng	شىرىنزا يېزىسى	shirinza yëzisi	شىرىنزى اۋىلى	Şyrynzy auyly Шырынзы ауылы	650521205
Huayuan Township	花园乡	Huāyuán Xiāng	خۇايۈەن يېزىسى	xuayüen yëzisi	حۋايۋان اۋىلى	Huaiuan auyly Хуайуан ауылы	650521206
Dahongliuxia Township	大红柳峡乡	Dàhóngliǔxiá Xiāng	چوڭ قۇلىنچەرى يېزىسى	chong qulincheri yëzisi	ۇلكەن قۇلىنشارى اۋىلى	Ulken Qūlynşary auyly Үлкен Құлыншары ауылы	650521208
Baqiangzi Township	八墙子乡	Bāqiángzǐ Xiāng	باچاڭزى يېزىسى	bachangzi yëzisi	باچياڭزى اۋىلى	Baçyañzy auyly Бачяңзы ауылы	650521209
Other Township-level Divisions
Liangzhong Breeding Farm	良种繁育场	Liángzhǒng Fányù Chǎng					650521400
Huangtuchang Development Zone	黄土场开发区	Huángtǔchǎng Kāifā Qū	خۇاڭتۇچاڭ تەرەققىيات رايونى	huangtuchang tereqqiyat rayoni	سارى دالا اشۋ رايونى	Sary dala aşu raiony Сары дала ашу районы	650521401
Barkol County Shannan Development Zone	巴里坤县山南开发区	Bālǐkūn Xiàn Shānnán Kāifā Qū					650521402
Bingtuan Hongshan Farm	兵团红山农场	Bīngtuán Hóngshān Nóngchǎng	قىزىلتاغ دېھقانچىلىق مەيدانى	qiziltagh dëhqanchiliq meydani	قىزىلتاۋ ەگىس الاڭى	Qyzyltau egys alañy Қызылтау егыс алаңы	650521500

== Geography ==
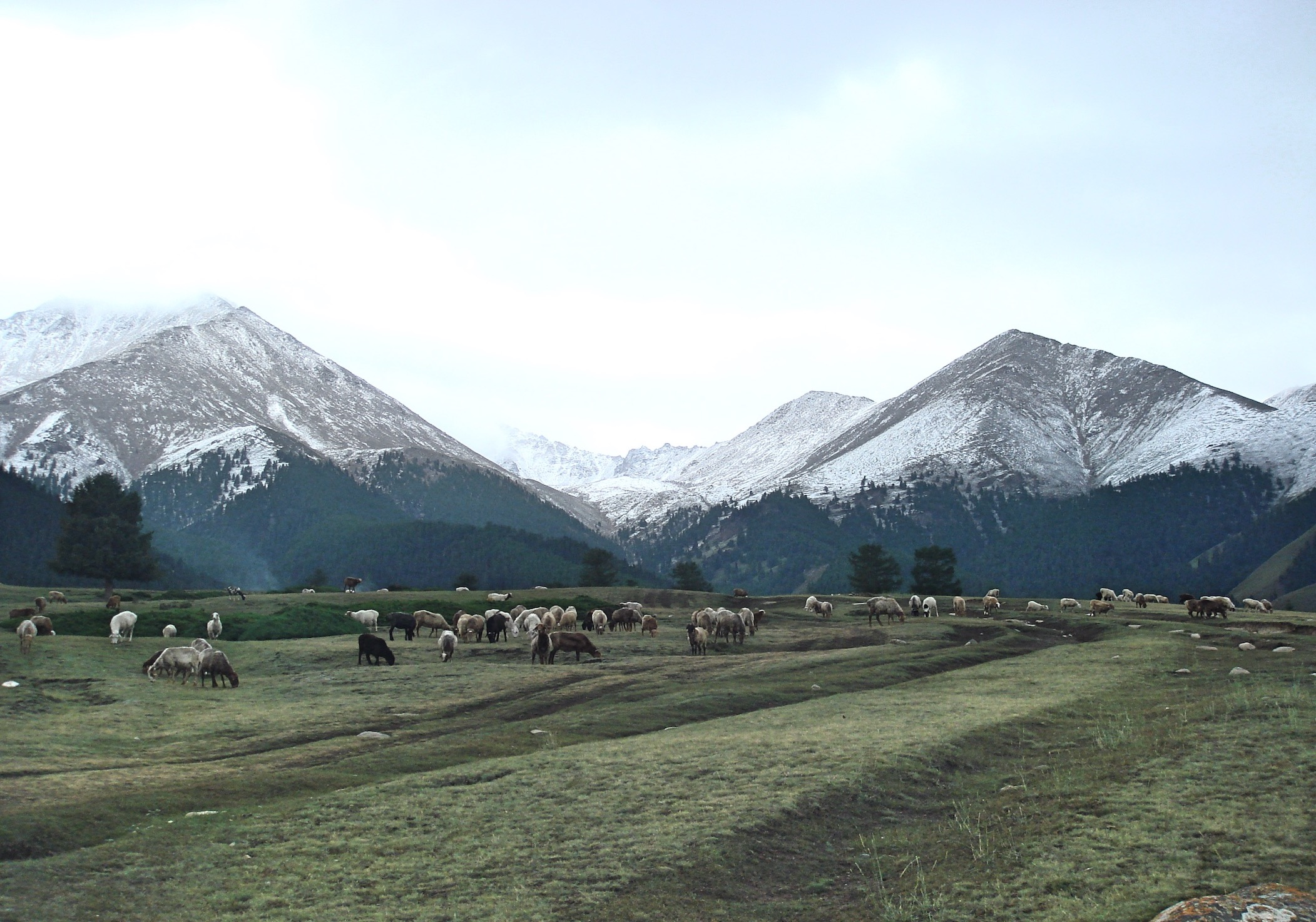
Surrounding of the Shirenzigou archaeological site in Barkol County.

Barkol Kazakh Autonomous County spans a total area of 38,400 square kilometres (14,800 mi^{2}), including 25,500 square kilometres (9,800 mi^{2}) of mountains and the Gobi Desert, accounting for 66% of the total area of the autonomous county. The terrain is high in the southeast and low in the northwest, with an average elevation of 1,650 metres (5,410 ft). In the south is Mount Barkol, in the middle is Mount Moqinura, and in the north is Mount Beita. Barkol Mountain is located on the southern edge of the county and is the eastern section of the Tianshan Mountains. It stretches for more than 160 kilometres (99 mi) within the county, with an average elevation of 3,300 metres (10,800 ft). The peaks above 3,600 metres (11,800 ft) above sea level are covered with snow all year round and there are a large number of glaciers. The central part of Barkol Kazakh Autonomous County is the Moqin Wula Mountain, a branch of the Tianshan Mountains. The Moqin Wula Mountain extends from the northwest to the southeast. The northernmost part is the Beita Mountain, part of the Altai Mountains, which belongs to the Eastern Junggar fault block mountain system. There are 1.34 million mu of wetlands. The woodland is 1.227 million mu, the forest coverage rate is 1.45%, and there are more than 500 kinds of wild plants. Wild animals in the autonomous county include red deer, snow leopards, wild asses, Mongolian gazelles, wild boar, wolves, Corsac foxes, pine martens, marmots, snow chickens, quails, eagles, and falcons.

The total amount of water resources in Barkol County is 559,000,000 cubic metres (1.97×10^{10} ft^{3}), including 357,000,000 cubic metres (1.26×10^{10} ft^{3}) of surface runoff and 202,000,000 cubic metres (7.1×10^{9} ft^{3}) of groundwater resources. The area mainly relies on alpine glaciers melt water and atmospheric precipitation recharge. At present, the total annual development and utilization of water resources is 186,000,000 cubic metres (6.6×10^{9} ft^{3}), including 123,000,000 cubic metres (4.3×10^{9} ft^{3}) of surface water and 63,000,000 cubic metres (2.2×10^{9} ft^{3}) of groundwater. There are 46 large and small rivers in the county, with an annual runoff of 212,000,000 cubic metres (7.5×10^{9} ft^{3}). The larger rivers include Xiheigou, Dongheigou, Hongshankougou and Liutiao River, with a total annual runoff of 72,000,000 cubic metres (2.5×10^{9} ft^{3}). The rivers are mainly concentrated in the mountains around the Balikun Basin and flow to the Barkol Lake. Most of them are seasonal rivers with small water volume, short flow and large seepage. Most of the rivers infiltrate underground soon after exiting the mountain pass. Barkol Lake is a salt water lake with a total area of about 113 square kilometres (44 mi^{2}). There are 556 large and small springs in Barkol, 45 of which can be used for agriculture and animal husbandry. There are 15 glaciers in Barkol, which are distributed on the northern slope of Mount Barkol in the south of the county. There are many small-scale ice bucket glaciers and hanging glaciers. There are flat-topped glaciers on the quasi-plain on the top of the mountain. The glacier area is 8.64 square kilometres (3.34 mi^{2}), and has ice reserves of 351,000,000 cubic metres (1.24×10^{10} ft^{3}).

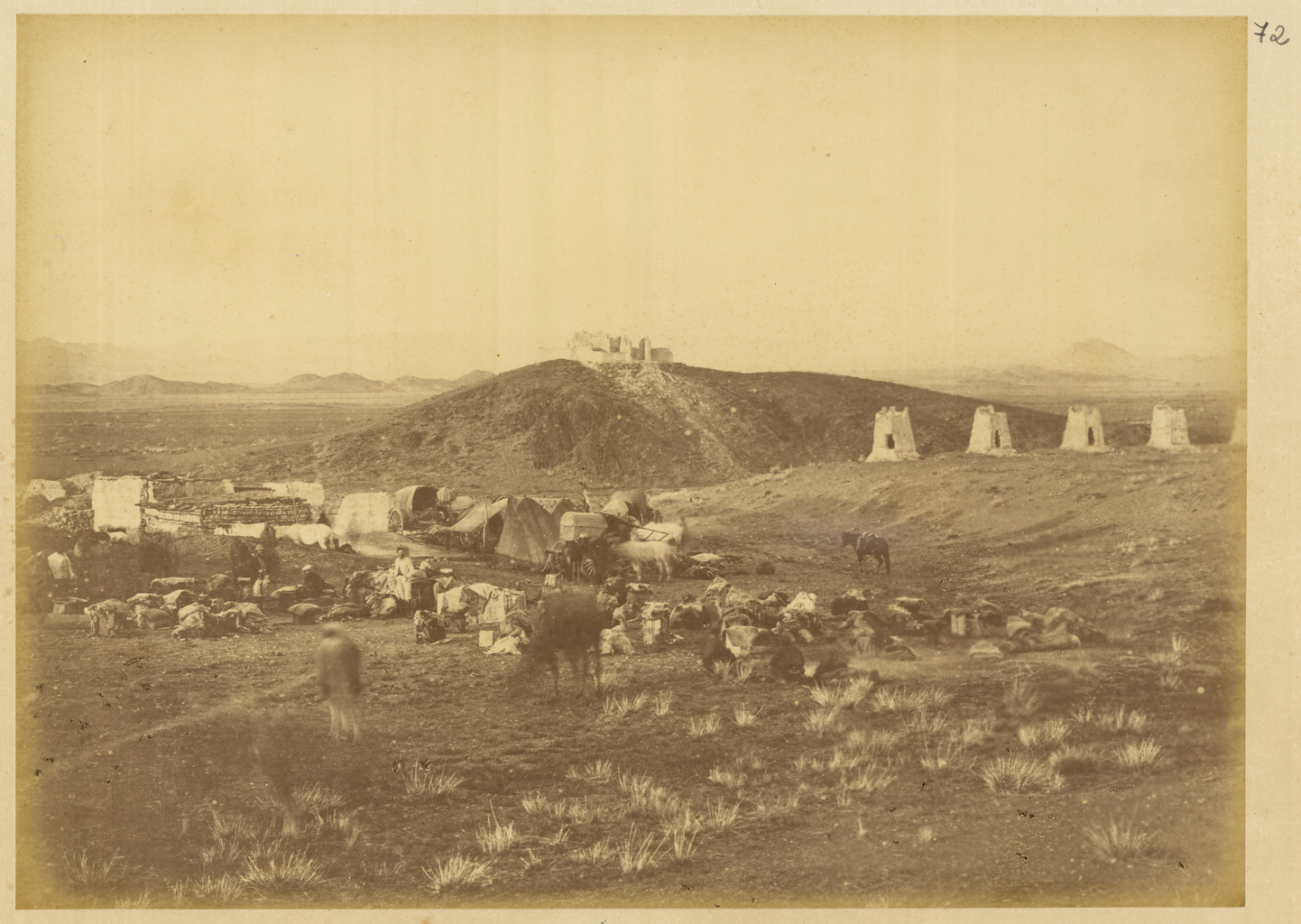
General View of the Gukeichanza Station with a Citadel at Top of the Mountain, near Barkul. Xinjiang, China, 1875

More than 30 kinds of mineral resources in Barkol County have been proved, including coal, petroleum, mirabilite, gold, and bentonite. Coal resources are mainly distributed in the Santanghu coalfield and the western coalfield, of which the Santanghu coalfield reserves 58.5 billion tons and the western coalfield reserves 31.2 billion tons. The net reserves of thenardite are 48.93 million tons, mainly distributed in Barkol Lake. It is one of the three major alkali sulfide production bases in the country, with a market share of 25% in the country. Oil is mainly distributed in the Santanghu Basin, with predicted oil and gas reserves of 930 million tons, proven oil reserves of 570 million tons and natural gas reserves of 10,000,000,000 cubic metres (3.5×10^{11} ft^{3}). Barkol Santanghu wind area is one of the nine major wind areas in Xinjiang, with an average annual wind speed of 8.2 metres per second (27 ft/s), an annual effective wind speed of 7,344 hours, more than 2,300 hours of full-load power generation, and a technological development volume of 48.97 million kilowatts. The installed capacity is 450,000 kilowatts, and the grid-connected power generation is 35 kilowatts, with a cumulative power generation of 889 million kWh.

=== Climate ===
Barkol Kazakh Autonomous County belongs to the temperate continental cool arid climate zone, with an average altitude of 1,650 meters. It is cold in winter and cool in summer, with sufficient sunlight and four distinct seasons. The average annual temperature is 1 °C, the extreme maximum temperature is 35 °C, and the extreme minimum temperature is −43.6 °C. The frost-free period is 98 to 104 days. The annual precipitation is only about 220 mm, and the evaporation is 1638 mm. The air is dry, the atmospheric transparency is good, the cloud cover is less, the sunshine is sufficient, and the light energy resources are abundant. The annual sunshine hours are 3,170 hours, which is one of the areas with the most sunshine hours in the country. Among them, the Santang Lake Basin has 3,350 sunshine hours throughout the year. hours or more.

Lake Barkol is an alkali lake in a closed basin located at 43.668°N 92.803°E. Current rainfall averages 210 millimetres (8.3 in), while the annual evaporation rate is 2,250 millimetres (89 in). Ancient shorelines show up as concentric rings on the satellite photo at right, indicating that water levels have varied many times in the past. One study identified five climates at Lake Barkol over the past 8,000 years, ranging from warm and wet to cold and wet and finally cold and dry at present. The average annual temperature in the area is now just 1 °C (34 °F), though temperatures swing from extreme highs (33.5 °C (92.3 °F)) to extreme lows (−43.6 °C (−46.5 °F)).

Climate data for Barkol, elevation 1,679 m (5,509 ft), (1991–2020 normals, extremes 1981–2010)
Month	Jan	Feb	Mar	Apr	May	Jun	Jul	Aug	Sep	Oct	Nov	Dec	Year
Record high °C (°F)	3.7 (38.7)	11.0 (51.8)	19.1 (66.4)	27.3 (81.1)	29.1 (84.4)	33.3 (91.9)	34.8 (94.6)	35.0 (95.0)	29.9 (85.8)	24.9 (76.8)	16.3 (61.3)	13.7 (56.7)	35.0 (95.0)
Mean daily maximum °C (°F)	−8.7 (16.3)	−4.0 (24.8)	4.8 (40.6)	13.7 (56.7)	19.3 (66.7)	24.2 (75.6)	26.1 (79.0)	25.0 (77.0)	19.7 (67.5)	11.5 (52.7)	2.4 (36.3)	−6.2 (20.8)	10.7 (51.2)
Daily mean °C (°F)	−16.4 (2.5)	−12.2 (10.0)	−2.7 (27.1)	6.6 (43.9)	12.5 (54.5)	17.8 (64.0)	19.6 (67.3)	17.8 (64.0)	11.7 (53.1)	3.6 (38.5)	−4.9 (23.2)	−13.3 (8.1)	3.3 (38.0)
Mean daily minimum °C (°F)	−22.0 (−7.6)	−18.4 (−1.1)	−8.6 (16.5)	0.0 (32.0)	5.5 (41.9)	11.0 (51.8)	13.0 (55.4)	10.8 (51.4)	4.8 (40.6)	−2.4 (27.7)	−10.3 (13.5)	−18.7 (−1.7)	−2.9 (26.7)
Record low °C (°F)	−39.8 (−39.6)	−35.2 (−31.4)	−30.7 (−23.3)	−15.2 (4.6)	−13.0 (8.6)	0.2 (32.4)	3.4 (38.1)	−4.6 (23.7)	−9.0 (15.8)	−21.5 (−6.7)	−36.2 (−33.2)	−41.4 (−42.5)	−41.4 (−42.5)
Average precipitation mm (inches)	3.9 (0.15)	3.9 (0.15)	6.6 (0.26)	17.0 (0.67)	27.5 (1.08)	36.0 (1.42)	53.4 (2.10)	39.3 (1.55)	27.6 (1.09)	17.5 (0.69)	7.2 (0.28)	4.8 (0.19)	244.7 (9.63)
Average precipitation days (≥ 0.1 mm)	4.2	3.9	4.4	5.5	6.6	8.0	10.1	7.3	5.1	4.7	4.4	4.5	68.7
Average snowy days	6.9	5.9	6.6	4.9	2.1	0	0	0.1	0.9	4.0	6.6	7.2	45.2
Average relative humidity (%)	68	65	54	42	40	42	47	46	46	52	60	66	52
Mean monthly sunshine hours	197.7	213.3	264.6	267.3	303.2	289.1	292.5	295.0	281.8	253.4	194.4	173.9	3,026.2
Percentage possible sunshine	68	71	70	66	66	63	63	69	77	76	68	63	68
Source: China Meteorological Administration

== Demographics ==
In the 2010 Chinese Census, the total resident population of Barkol Kazakh Autonomous County was 75,442, down from 85,964 in the 2000 Chinese Census.

Township-level populations of Barkol Kazakh Autonomous County
Township-level division	2000 Population	2010 Population
Barköl	12,552	14,313
Bo'erqiangji	443	1,797
Dahe	17,842	9,784
Kuisu	10,018	6,635
Santanghu	1,403	1,953
Sa'erqiaoke Township	4,472	3,662
Haiziyan Township	6,229	5,297
Xiaolaoba Township	5,273	4,335
Shirenzi Township	7,531	4,757
Huayuan Township	6,504	4,942
Dahongliuxia Township	2,915	3,388
Baqiangzi Township	1,458	2,037
Liangzhong Breeding Farm	n/a	367
Huangtuchang Development Zone	n/a	2,109
Barkol County Shannan Development Zone	n/a	n/a
Bingtuan Hongshan Farm	6,533	10,066
Bingtuan Hongxing One Ranch	2,791	n/a

As of 2010, the autonomous county has 27,236 registered permanent households and 75,442 registered permanent residents, including 40,038 males, 35,404 females, and 50,775 agricultural populations. In 2000, the autonomous county had 22,257 registered permanent households and 85,964 registered permanent residents, including 44,068 males, 41,896 females, and 68,857 agricultural populations.

=== Ethnic composition ===
The proportion of nationalities in Barkol Kazakh Autonomous County
Nationality	Percentage
Han People	61.2%
Kazakhs	36.3%
Mongols	1.6%
Hui People	0.4%
Uyghurs	0.2%
Others	0.3%
Source of the population statistics :

== Economy ==
The economy of Barkol is mainly based on resource-based industry, agriculture, animal husbandry and tourism. In 1996, it was designated as an animal husbandry county by the autonomous region. There are 28.66 million mu (1.91 million hectares) of natural grassland and 19.98 million mu of usable grassland, including 180,000 mu (12,000 ha or 30,000 acres) of high-quality mowing fields. The main specialty livestock are Barkol horse, Barkol Bactrian camel, Xinjiang brown cattle, Barkol Kazakh meat sheep, and Barkol velvet. Goats, Altai big-tailed sheep, etc. Among them, Barkol's "Likun" brand beef and mutton, and potatoes have been certified by China's national "green food". Barkol has 504,000 mu (33,600 ha or 83,000 acres) of arable land, including 366,000 mu (24,400 ha or 60,000 acres) of basic farmland, and about 300,000 mu (20,000 ha or 49,000 acres) of sown annually. The main agricultural products are potatoes, Dalu vegetables, barley, wheat, late-ripening cantaloupe, etc. Chinese herbal medicines include snow lotus, cistanche, licorice, ephedra, mint, motherwort, wolfberry, etc. Since the 1960s, the construction of the reservoir has provided a good environment for fish growth. In 2010, the water surface area of Barkol was 256.33 hectares (633.4 acres), and the main fish were carp and crucian carp. But the water temperature is low, the fish has a long wintering period and a short growth period. The large quantity of Artemia in Lake Barkol is a high-quality fish bait. The main industrial products are coal, wind power, thenardite, alkali sulfide, crude oil, gold, etc.

In 2019, the regional GDP of Barkol Kazakh Autonomous County was 7.86806 billion yuan, the added value of the primary industry was 1.00353 billion yuan, the added value of the secondary industry was 4.35177 billion yuan, the general public budget revenue was 585.06 million yuan, and the general public budget expenditure was 2.1399 billion yuan. The disposable income of urban and rural residents reached 32,387 yuan and 14,758 yuan respectively, and the added value of industries above designated size reached 3 billion yuan. Planting 261,300 mu (17,420 ha or 43,000 acres) of wheat, 15,000 mu (1,000 ha or 2,500 acres) of edible sunflower, 8,000 mu (500 ha or 1,200 acres) of open field vegetables and 4,500 mu (300 ha or 740 acres) of potatoes, the coverage rate of good crop varieties is 98%; 6,094 cattle have been improved in cold breeding, with an improvement rate of 75%; 435,100 livestock of various types have been slaughtered. First, the commodity rate reached 85.7%. The annual output of wind power was 5.5 billion kWh, and the output value of agricultural product processing enterprises was 109 million yuan, with online purchases of 27.95 million yuan and sales of 11.38 million yuan, an increase of 67% and 74% respectively. It received 2 million tourists throughout the year, achieved tourism revenue of 500 million yuan, and tax revenue of 119 million yuan.

== Culture ==
Balikun Kazakh Autonomous County has Dahe Ancient City, a national key cultural relic protection unit, Yuegongtai-Xiheigou site group, a key cultural relics protection unit in the autonomous region, the ancient city site of Barkol and the Dongheigou site, one of the top ten new archaeological discoveries in China in 2007. There are 29 beacon sites built in the Tang and Qing dynasties that stretch for more than 200 kilometers, the Renshang Stele during the Eastern Han Dynasty, the Barkol Mingsha Mountain, the Barkol Grassland, the Balikun Lake and tens of thousands of rock paintings and other cultural relics. There are 3 national 4A-level scenic spots, namely, the ancient city of Balikun scenic spot, the scenic spot of Gaojia Lake wetland and the scenic spot of Barkol Lake.

Balikun's specialty snacks mainly include grilled meat, lamb stewed pancakes, soil hot pot, wild mushroom stewed chicken, shaozi noodles, steamed pancakes, barbecued meat, roasted lamb chops, and stewed meat including eight bowls of Xinjiang intangible cultural heritage Barkol soil mat, steamed meat, finger meat, Baoer Shake, horse meat Naren, pilaf, milk tea, etc. The characteristic wild vegetables mainly include Artemisia vulgaris, shallots, wild mushrooms, endives, and wild mustards.

In 1773, a professor's yamen was set up in Zhenxi Prefecture, and an education yamen was set up in Yihe County. In 1855, the Zhenxi Hall set up a school and political yamen, and established Songfeng Academy in Wenchang Palace, East Street of Hancheng. In 1906, the school palace of Yuanyuan Temple was changed to a primary school. In 1908, the elementary school was changed to the second-class school in Zhenxi Hall. In the early years of the Republic of China, 7 schools and schools in the county were merged into Zhenxi County National School. In 1950, there were 15 primary schools with a total of 1232 students. In October 1951, 5 tent primary schools were set up in each of the east and west pastoral areas, recruiting 335 students from pastoral areas. In 2010, there were 25 primary schools, 6 junior middle schools, and 2 senior middle schools. In 2005, the nine-year compulsory education schools in Barkol Kazakh Autonomous County were adjusted and merged from 41 to 29. At present, there are 31 primary and secondary schools in the county, including 21 primary schools, 1 high school, 1 complete middle school, and 8 nine-year schools.

== Transportation ==
In 1939, a simple road was built from Hami to Zhenxi County via Songshutang. In 2002, it was extended westward from Barkol County to Fukang, called Hafu Line, that is, Provincial Road 303. In 1956, the Barkol County Transportation Station was established, and the passenger shuttle bus to and from Hami was opened. In the 1980s, the reconstruction and expansion of rural roads began, and in the 1990s, the roads from county towns to townships were basically smooth. In 2010, the county's provincial highway mileage reached 209 kilometers. On May 20, 2021, the Barkol section of Beijing-Xinjiang Expressway was fully completed. The Barkol Dahe Airport opened on July 15, 2025.
