= Yanbulaq culture =

Archaeological site in People's Republic of China

- Location of the Yanbulaq culture, with contemporary cultures in the 5th century BCE
- Geographical range: Xinjiang
- Dates: 1100–500 BCE
- Type site: Yanbulaq 42.878432°N 94.680668°E

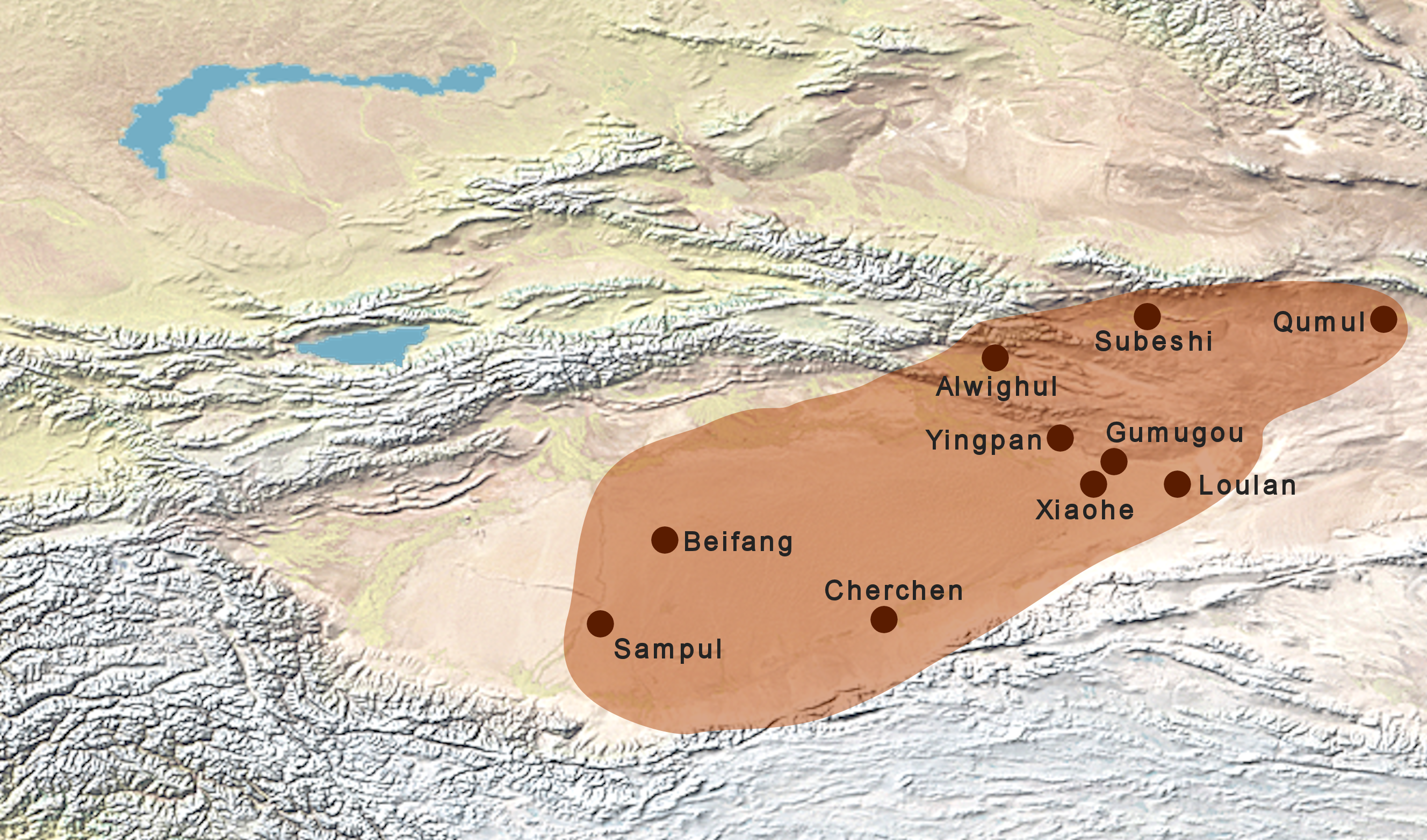
The Tarim Basin, with the Taklamakan Desert, and area of the Tarim mummies ( ) with main burial sites, and the Qumul area of the Yanbulaq culture at the extreme east.

The Yanbulaq culture (Ch: 焉不拉克文化 or 焉布拉克文化, Yanbulake wenhua, 1100–500 BCE) was an ancient culture based on the tombs of the Yanbulaq Cemetery (Chinese 焉不拉克古墓群, Pinyin Yānbùlākè gǔmùqún or焉不拉克墓地, Yānbùlākè mùdì, English Yanbulaq Cemetery) located on the northern hills of the Qumul Basin, in Yizhou District, Xinjiang, China. It was a Bronze Age culture, or an early Iron Age culture.

The cemetery at Yanbulaq contained 29 mummies which dated from 1100 to 500 BCE, 21 of which are Asian—the earliest Asian mummies found in the Tarim Basin—and the remaining 8 are of the same Caucasian physical type as found at Qäwrighul. These later and eastern "Tarim mummies" represented both "Caucasoid" and "Mongoloid" remains, indicating contact between newly arrived western nomads and agricultural communities in the east.

The Yuezhi may have been positioned around the Shirenzigou culture area, between the Subeshi culture to their west, the Yanbulaq culture to their east, the aftermaths of the Chemurchek culture to the north, and a wide desertical area to south about a thousand kilometers away from the Central Plains of China. It may also have had contacts with the painted pottery Bronze Age cultures in the Gansu and Qinghai regions.

Archaeological finds of iron knives suggest that the Yanbulaq culture, as well as the Shajing culture further south, may have been instrumental in the transmission of iron technology to China.

The Yanbulaq culture waned after 500 BCE.

The site has been on the list of monuments of the People's Republic of China (5-189) since 2001 .

== Sources ==
- Zhang Ping (among others): “Xinjiang Hami Yanbulake mudi” (The Yanbulake Cemetery in Hami, Xinkiang). Kaogu xuebao 1989, No. 3, pp. 325–362 + plates 7–14. English summary p. 362. Han Kangxin: Xinjiang). Kaogu Xuebao 1990, No. 3
- Mallory, J. P.; Mair, Victor H. (2000). The Tarim Mummies: Ancient China and the Mystery of the Earliest Peoples from the West. London: Thames & Hudson.
