= Shirenzigou culture =

Iron Age archaeological culture near the Tarim Basin

- Location of the Shirenzigou culture, with contemporary cultures circa 325 BCE
- Geographical range: Xinjiang
- Dates: 400–190 BCE
- Type site: Shirenzigou 43.528234°N 93.241880°E
- Followed by: Xiongnu

The Shirenzigou culture (Chinese: 石人子沟文化, ca. 410–190 BCE), also referred to as Dongheigou (东黑沟), or Heigouliang-Dongheigou (黑沟梁-东黑沟), is an archaeological culture from the Shirenzigou site in Barkol County, to the east of the Tarim Basin.

Skeletal evidence from sites in Shirenzigou and Xigou in eastern Xinjiang indicate that by the fourth century BCE both horseback riding and mounted archery were practiced along China's northwest frontier.

Culturally, the Shirenzigou site showed strong affinity with the neighbouring Yanbulake culture close to the east and the Pazyryk culture to the northwest (deer-shaped griffin motifs) from the Altai region. The Shirenzigou culture is sometimes considered as the easternmost expansion of the Pazyryk culture. Beads were also imported from China.

Looking at the archaeological and genetic evidence, the region has been suggested as an area of origin for the Yuezhi: the Yuegongtai-Xiheigou (岳公台-西黑沟) archaeological sites, corresponding to the Barkol culture in the Barkol County of Xinjiang. This would have positioned the Yuezhi between the Subeshi culture to their west, the Yanbulaq culture to their east, the aftermaths of the Chemurchek culture to the north, and a wide desertical area to south about a thousand kilometers away from the Central Plains of China.

== Genetics ==
Genetic studies on Iron Age individuals of the Shirenzigou site dated to circa 200 BCE have shown a fairly balanced admixture between the West Eurasian and East Eurasian genetic pools. The West Eurasian component was Yamnaya-related, while the East Eurasian component was Northeast Asian-related. The Yamnaya component suggests a strong probability that the Shirenzigou populations were derived from the Afanasievo culture to the north, and spoke an Indo-European language. This reinforces an Afanasievo origin hypothesis for the Tocharians, often called the "Steppe hypothesis", rather than a hypothesis favouring BMAC and Andronovo culture origins, the "Bactrian Oasis hypothesis".

The four extracted Y-DNA belonged to the following haplogroups: Q1a1a1, Q1a1b and R1b1a1a2 (two samples). The samples of mtDNA extracted belonged to haplogroups U4’9, T1a1b, I1b, U4, G3b, H15b1, U5b2c, U5a2, D4j1b, A17.

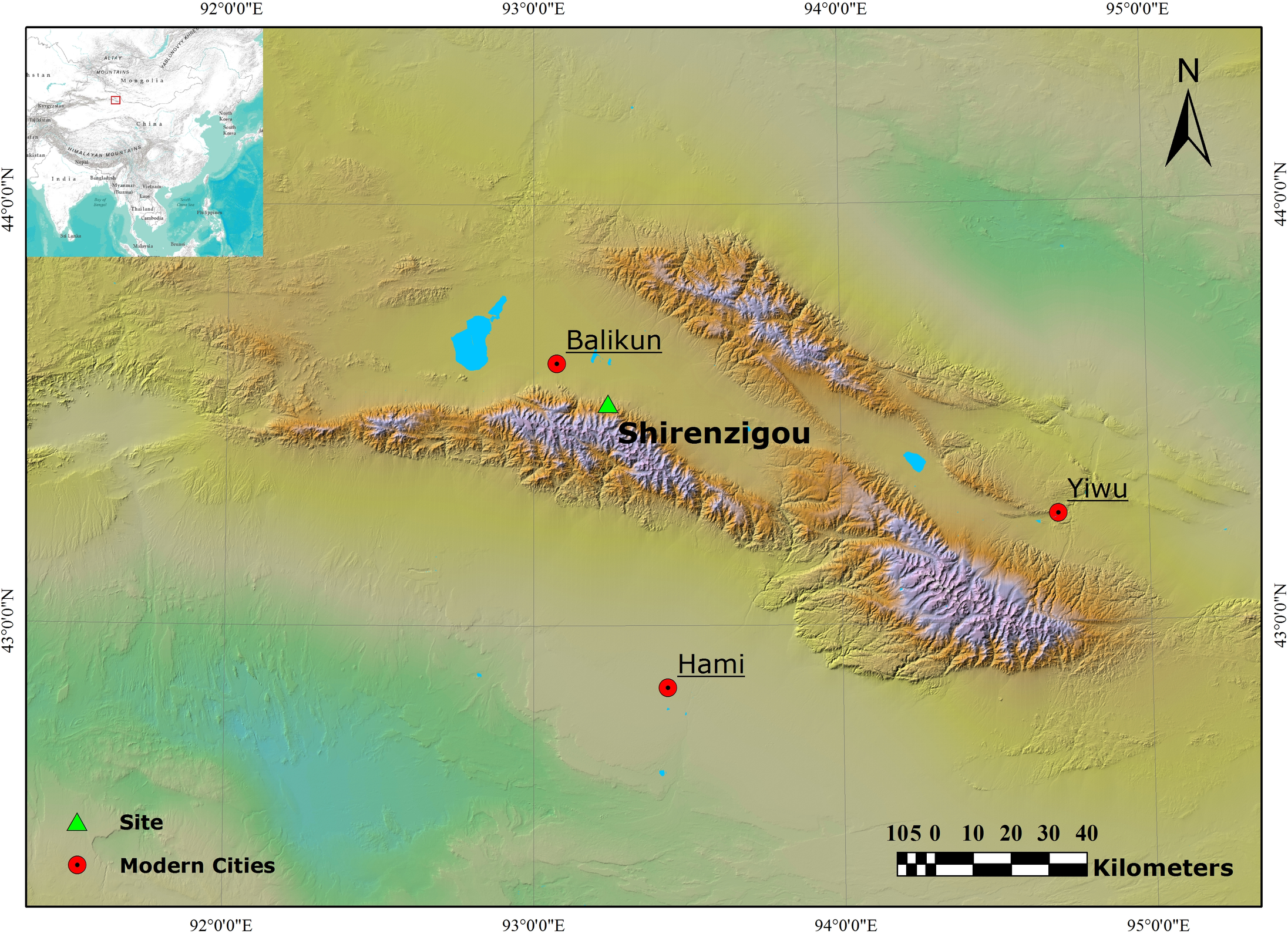
Shirenzigou map

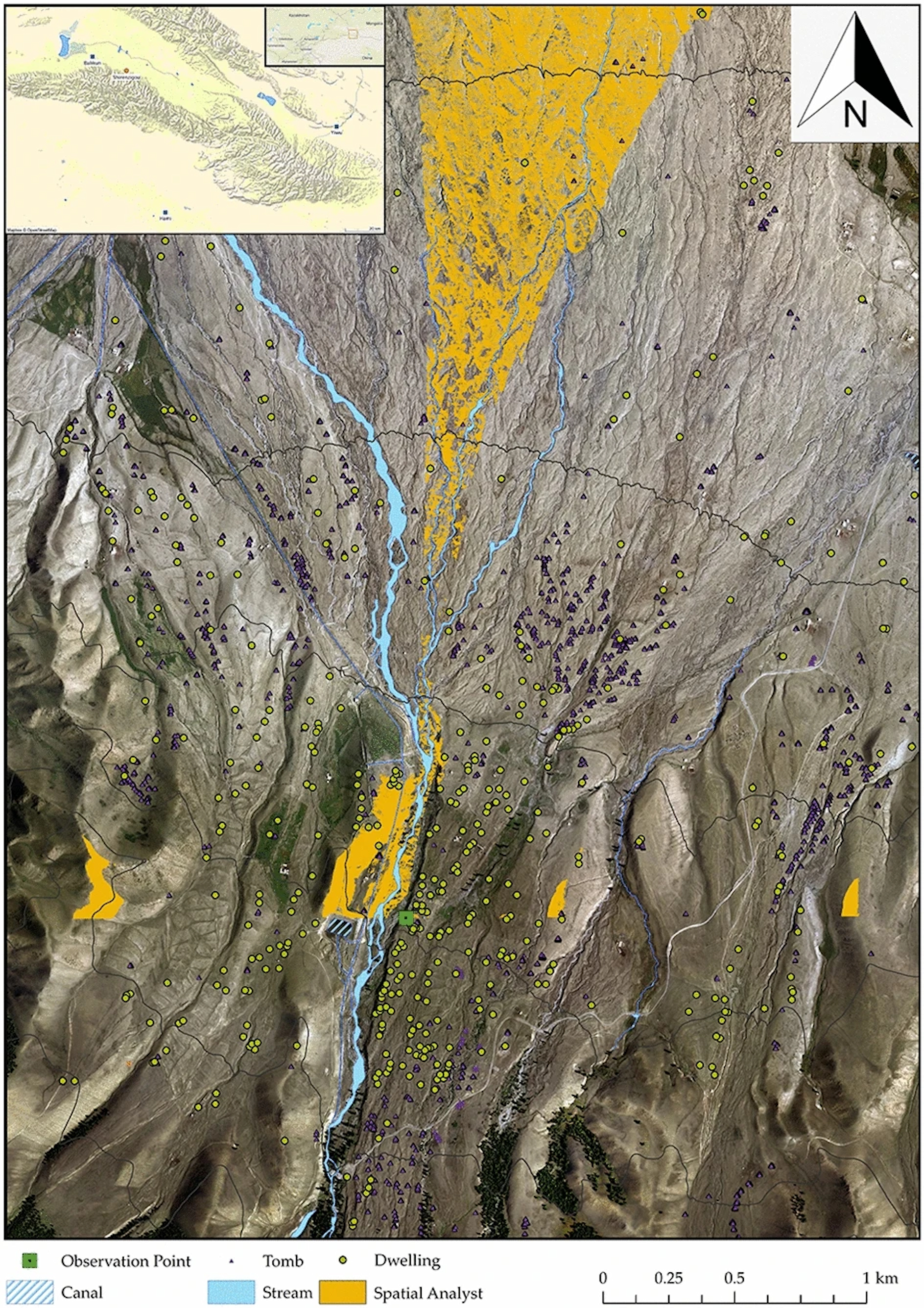
Shirenzigou site with dwellings (yellow circles) and tombs (purple triangles)

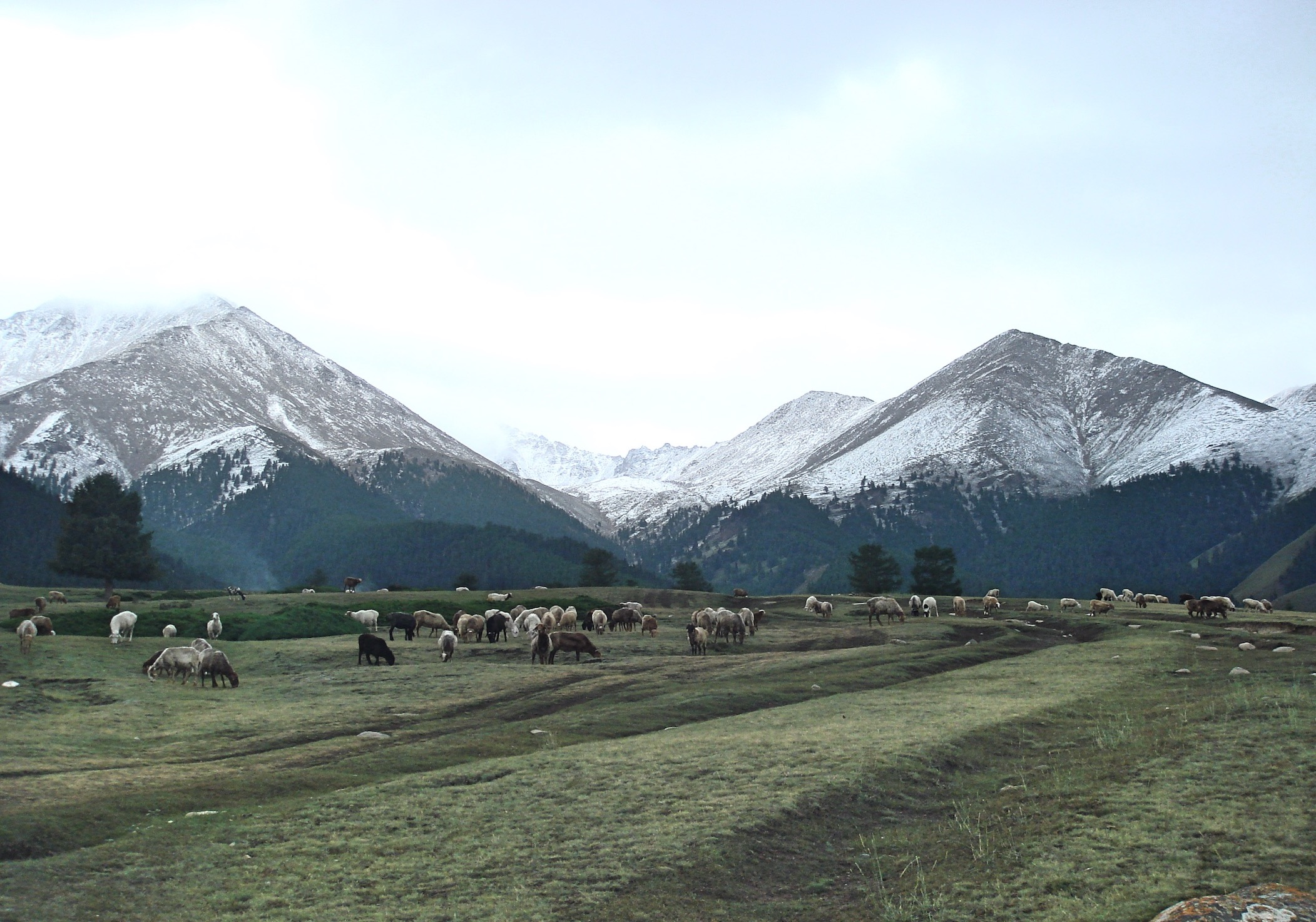
Surroundings of the Shirenzigou archaeological site in Barkol County

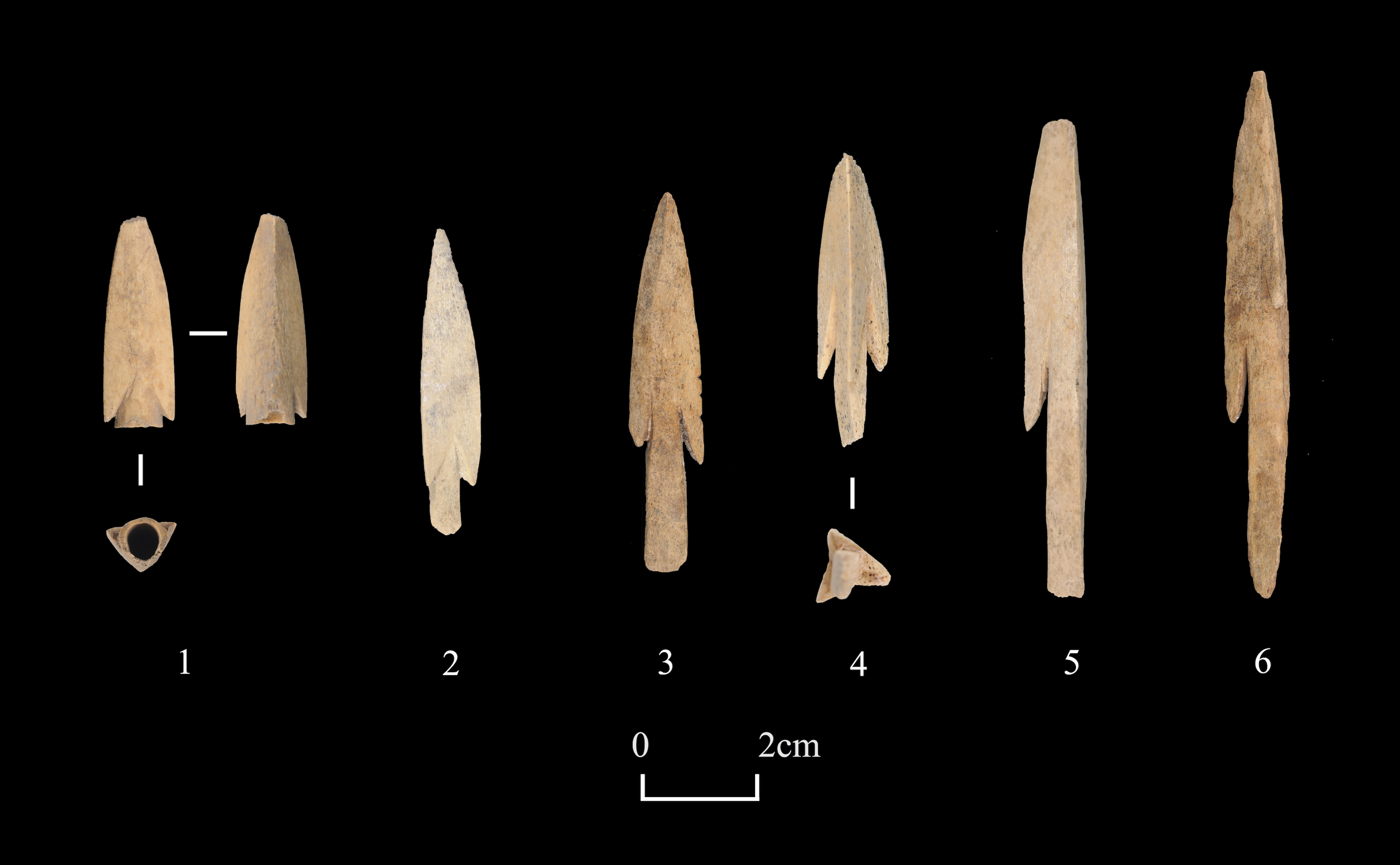
Shirenzigou bone arrowheads

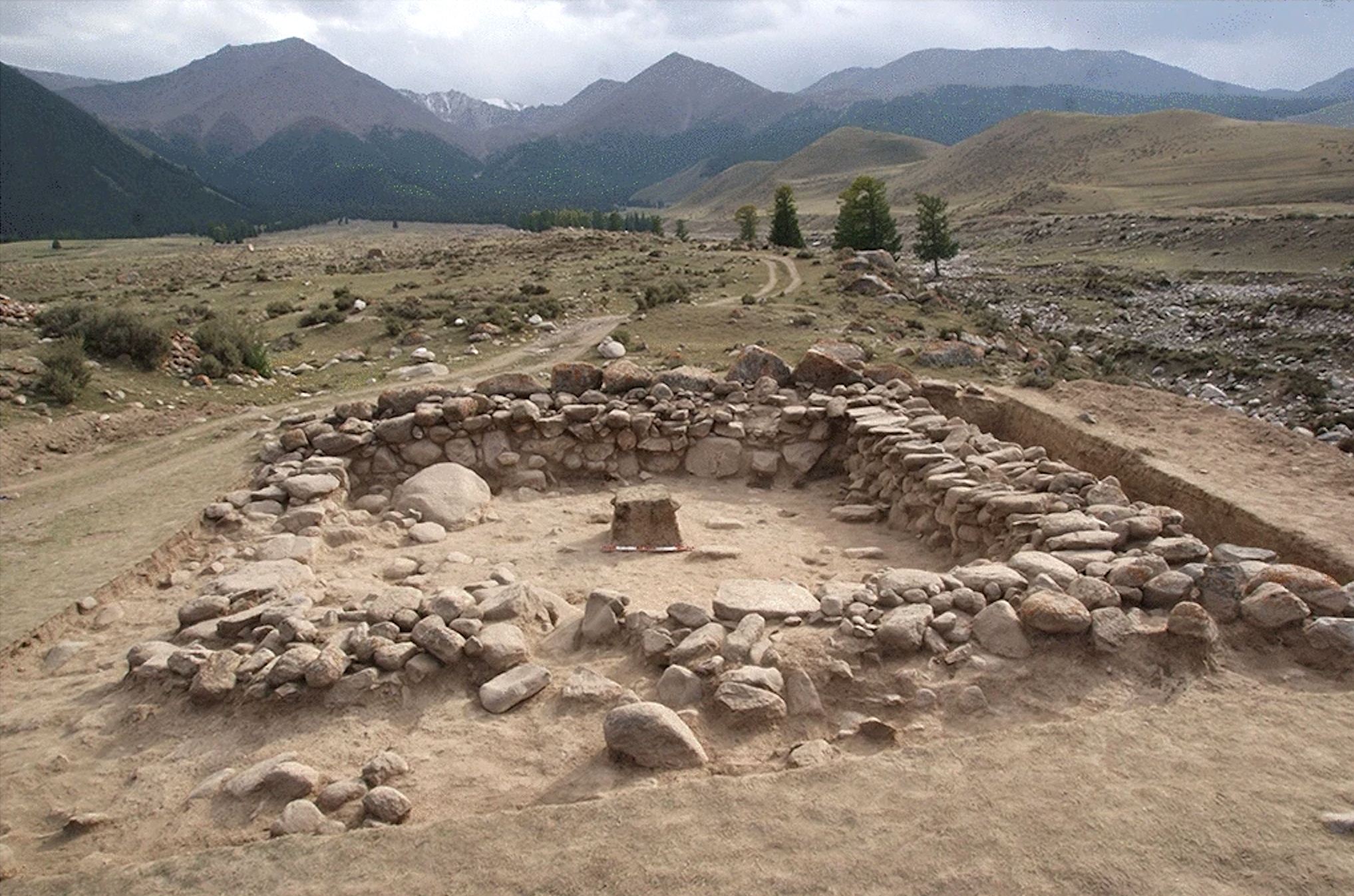
Shirenzigou dwelling F2 (from the North)

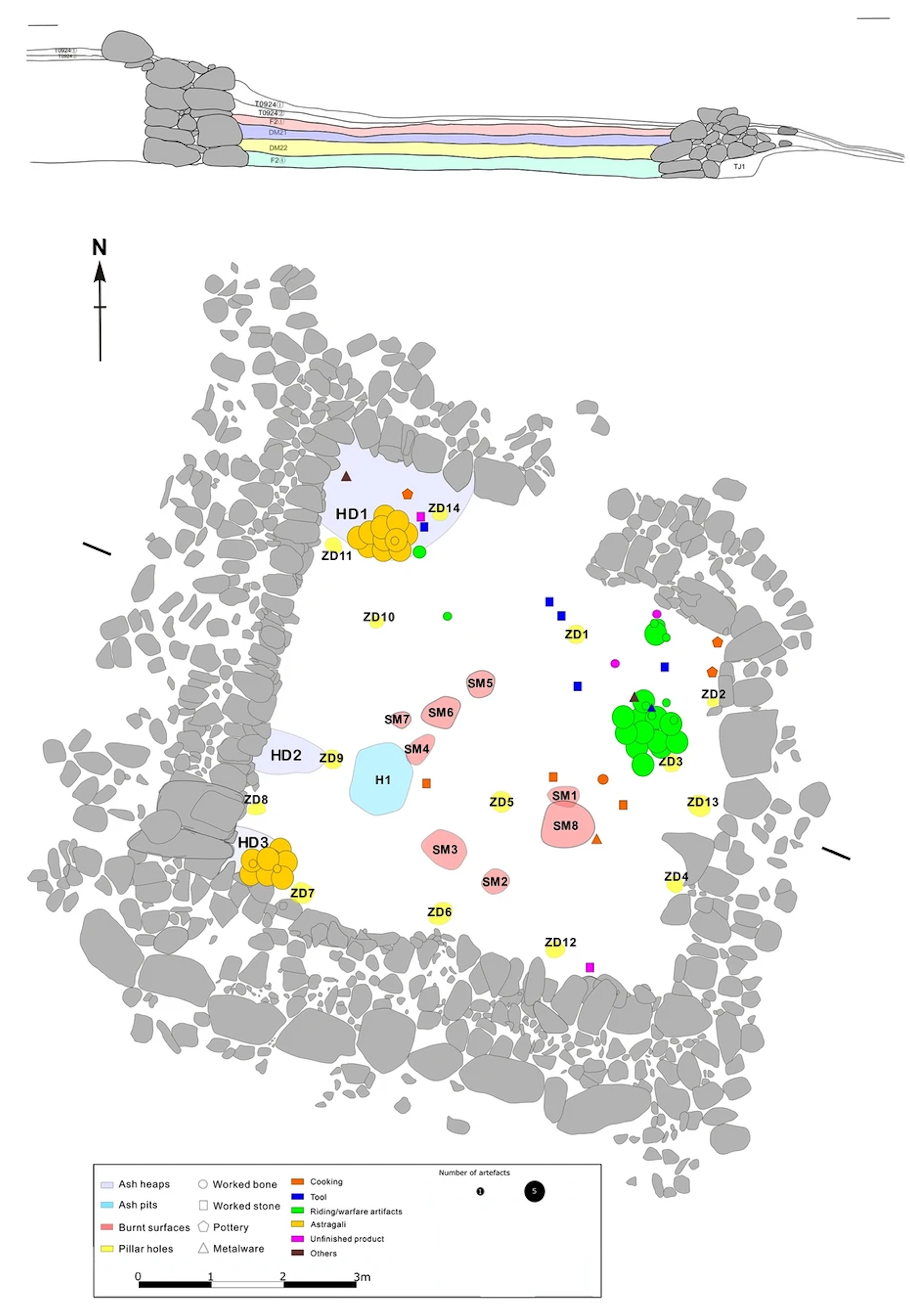
Shirenzigou dwelling F2, with artifacts

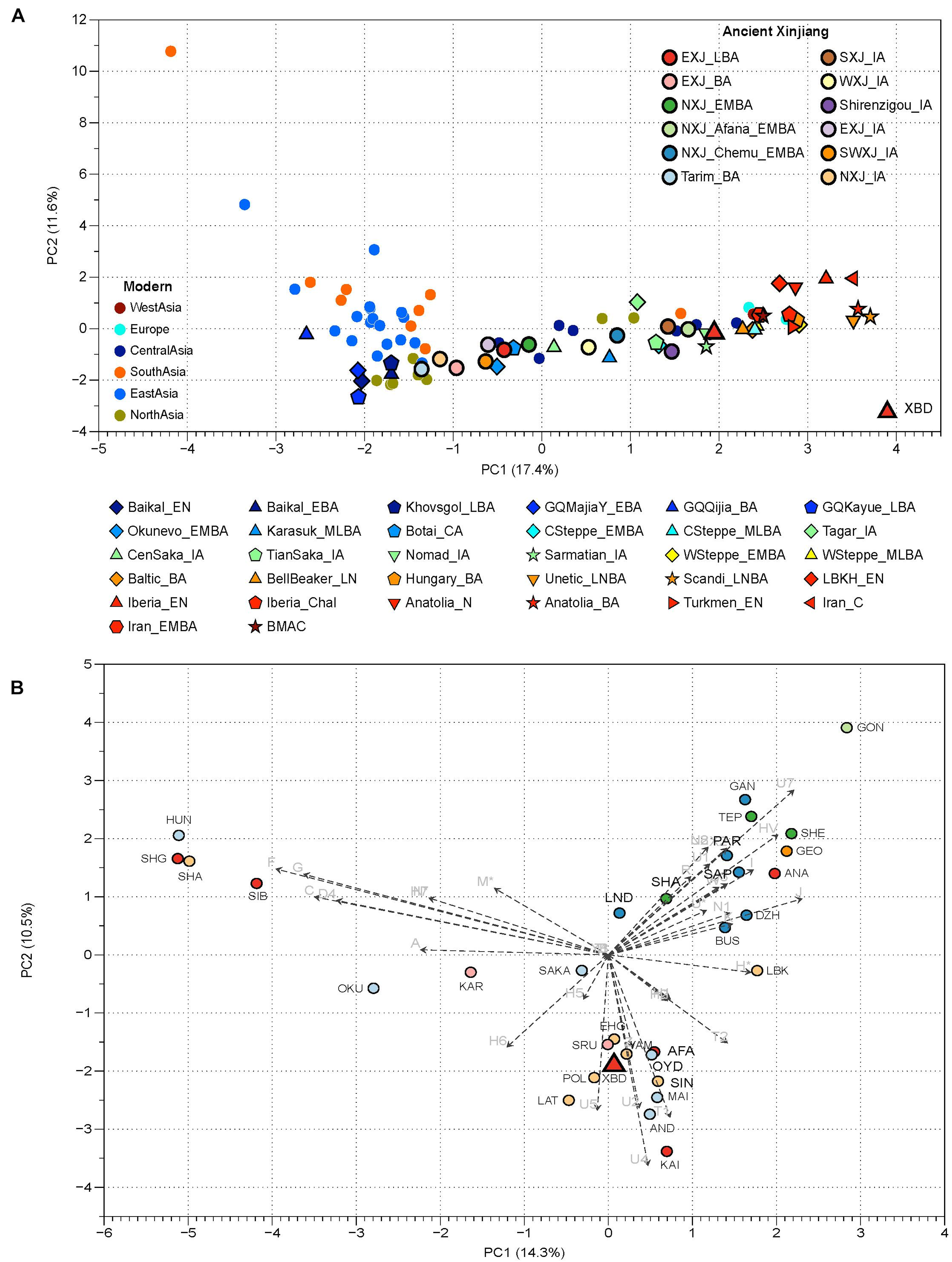
Principal component analysis (PCA) based on mitochondrial DNA (mtDNA) haplogroup frequencies of ancient and present-day Eurasian populations, with Shirenzigou samples
