= Battle of Yiwu =

1950 battle

Battle of Yiwu (伊吾)
- Part of Chinese Civil War
Date	March 29, 1950 – May 7, 1950
Location	Yiwu County, Xinjiang, China
Result	Communist victory

Belligerents
Republic of China	People's Republic of China

Commanders and leaders
Yulbars Khan; Abdullah	Hu Qingshan

Strength
45,000	100,000

Casualties and losses
?	?

The Battle of Yiwu (伊吾), also called the Battle to Defend Yiwu (伊吾保卫战) by the Chinese Communist Party and resulted in a communist victory. After a portion of the local nationalist commanders in Xinjiang defected to the communists, the remaining nationalists loyal to Chiang Kai-shek refused to join the communists and one detachment of these loyal nationalists decided to take the town of Yiwu (Uyghur: Ara Türük) to turn it into a guerrilla base in order to resume guerrilla activities until the eventual return of Chiang.

== The battle ==
The 2nd Company, 46th Regiment of the People's Liberation Army 16th Division, with less than 100 men were stationed at the town of Yiwu, 200 km northeast of Hami and over 700 nationalist troops under the nationalist Hami special envoy commissioner Yulbars Khan and the former nationalist county head Abdullah (艾拜都拉) of Hami planned to take the town in late March 1950. The nationalist attack on the town was launched according to schedule on March 29, 1950.

The nationalists were confident in that the town could be taken within as little as three days, and, on the first day of the battle, the nationalists had succeeded in taking the northern and southern peaks next to the town, seriously threatening the enemy defenders within the town. Realizing the serious situation, the enemy defenders sent out four squads to retake both peaks, and thus solidified the defense of the town, threatening the nationalists instead. The nationalist attempts to take the two peaks back was met with disastrous failure after several dozen assaults were beaten back with heavy losses. Realizing the tactic must be changed in order to avoid further casualties and the two hilltops must be taken, the nationalists adjusted their tactic of small-scale assaults to launch a coordinated large-scale attacks on April 5, 1950. After the five-hour-long battle that lasted from 3:00 AM to 8:00 AM, the nationalist again suffered defeat with great loss due to favorable terrain the enemy defenders enjoyed. It was the last large scale attack the nationalists were able to muster and the defeat cost the nationalists so much that nothing on the similar scale could be repeated again in the battle.

Due to the lack of communication and the closest PLA force was more than 200 km away, it was not until early April 1950 that the closest enemy force learned that their comrades in the town of Yiwu (伊吾) were besieged and sent out a token force as reinforcements, which was successfully stopped by the nationalists more than a dozen kilometers away from the town. Due to the lack of intelligence, the commander of the PLA reinforcements mistakenly believed that the town had fallen into the nationalist hands when the entire garrison was wiped out and withdrew to Micheng (沁城) on April 14, 1950. However, the PLA defending Yiwu (伊吾) were far from being wiped out, but instead, successfully beat back seven nationalist assaults, causing heavy casualties on the attacking nationalist troops, utilising the terrain to their advantage.

In the beginning of May 1950, the PLA 16th Division learned that the 2nd Company of the 46th Regiment still had the town firmly in its hands, and thus immediately sent out two battalions for reinforcement. By May 7, 1950, the PLA reinforcement had taken the Black Hilltop (Hei Shan Tou, 黑山头), and surrounded the nationalists who besieged the town. Sandwiched between the enemy defending the town and the enemy reinforcement surrounding them, the fates of the trapped nationalists were sealed. Realizing it was all over, the nationalists collapsed and attempted to flee despite the fact there was nowhere to escape. The PLA defenders easily linked up with their reinforcements and completely annihilated the nationalists on the same day, and not a single nationalist was able to escape. For the successful defense of the town, Peng Dehuai, the PRC defense minister awarded the 2nd Company of the 46th Regiment of the PLA 16th Division the title Steel and Iron 2nd Company, while the deputy battalion commander, Hu Qingshan (胡青山) was awarded the title of Combat Hero.

== Outcome ==
The nationalist defeat was primarily due to Chiang Kai-shek’s uncompromising doctrine of holding onto the land conquered at all costs, which was faithfully followed by the local nationalists, despite that it was simply impractical and impossible to hold on to the town. As it was becoming obviously clear that attacking nationalists were impossible to take the town, the nationalists refused to retreat, thus exhausting all of their available supplies. The lack of supplies, in turn, forced the nationalists to attempt to capture the town in order to capture more supplies, and thus the nationalists were locked in a dilemma they had created themselves, resulting in eventual total annihilation.

For the PLA, there was a special recipient of third class honor: it was not a soldier, but a military horse named Jujube Colored Horse (枣骝马). During the battle, the supply line (especially for water) to the communists defending the northern peak 211 metres above the sea level was sealed off by the nationalist fire. A PLA soldier named Wu Xiaoniu (吴小牛) of the 2nd Company was sent to take the horse to supply the isolated but crucial PLA position. Once fired by the enemy, the soldier immediately lay down and took cover behind rocks, and amazingly, the horse did the same by following its master, the soldier. Due to the severe shortage of manpower, Wu Xiaoniu only performed the supply mission once and then was tasked with other duties, and the horse was instructed to perform the mission itself by Wu Xiaoniu first loading it up with supply, and then pointing toward the northern peak. Amazingly, during the forty-day battle, the horse completed every mission itself while dodging enemy fire. Due to its special contribution, not only it was awarded the third-class honor after the battle, it remained in the service until its natural death in November 1967, instead of being discharged when aged like all other military horses. The Jujube Colored Horse had a military burial at the foothill of the northern peak it helped to defend, and in August 1985, a marble monument was added to its tomb.

== See also ==
- Outline of the Chinese Civil War
- Outline of the military history of the People's Republic of China
- National Revolutionary Army
- History of the People's Liberation Army
- Chinese Civil War
