= Yiwu County =

Yiwu County 伊吾县 (Chinese) ئارا تۈرۈك ناھىيىسى (Uyghur) اراتۇرىك اۋدانى (Kazakh) Aratürük
- County
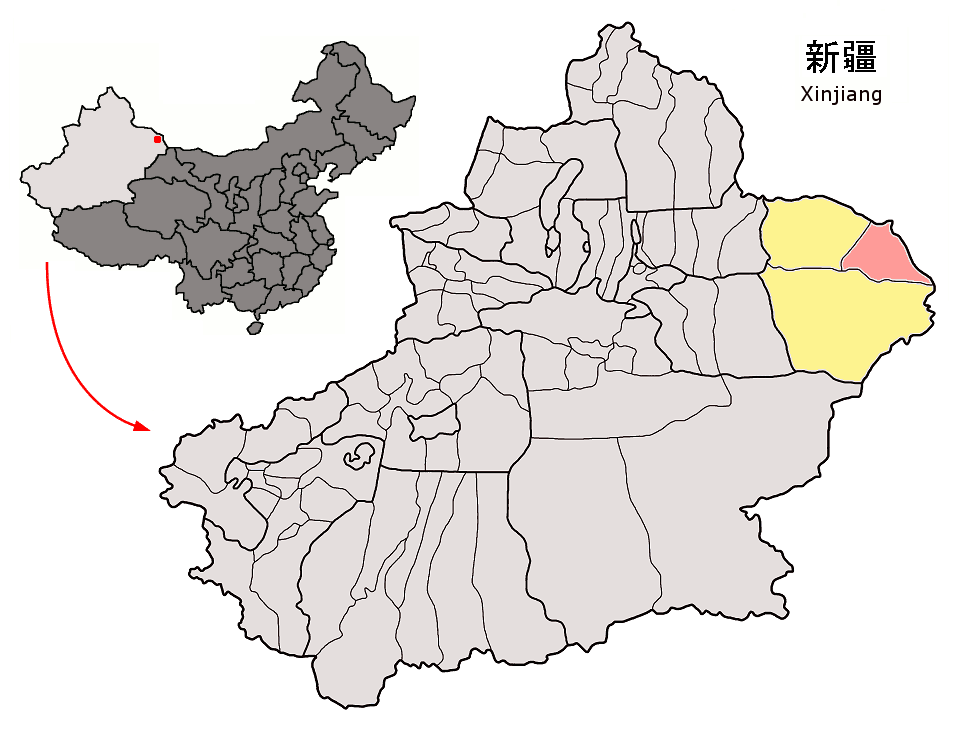
- Location of Yiwu County (red) within Hami City (yellow) and Xinjiang

- Location of the seat in Xinjiang Yiwu (China)
- Country: China
- Autonomous region: Xinjiang
- Prefecture-level city: Hami
- County seat: Aratürük Town (Yiwu)

Area
  - Total: 19,450 km^{2} (7,510 sq mi)

Population (2020)
  - Total: 38,464
  - Density: 1.978/km^{2} (5.122/sq mi)
- Time zone: UTC+8 (China Standard (Note: Locals in Xinjiang frequently observe UTC+6 (Xinjiang Time), 2 hours behind Beijing.))
- Website: www.xjyiwu.gov.cn

Yiwu County

Chinese name
- Simplified Chinese: 伊吾县
- Traditional Chinese: 伊吾縣
Transcriptions
Standard Mandarin
- Hanyu Pinyin: Yīwú Xiàn

Alternative Chinese name
- Simplified Chinese: 阿热吐鲁克县
- Traditional Chinese: 阿熱吐魯克縣
Transcriptions
Standard Mandarin
- Hanyu Pinyin: Ārètǔlǔkè Xiàn

Uyghur name
- Uyghur: ئارا تۈرۈك ناھىيىسى
Transcriptions
- Latin Yëziqi: Aratürük Nahiyisi
- Yengi Yeziⱪ: Aratürük Naⱨiyisi
- SASM/GNC: Aratürük Nahiyisi
- Siril Yëziqi: Аратүрүк Наһийиси

Kazakh name
- Kazakh: اراتۇرىك اۋدانى; Аратұрық ауданы Aratūryq audany

Yiwu County (Chinese: 伊吾县) as the official romanized name, also transliterated from Uyghur as Aratürük County (Uyghur: ئارا تۈرۈك ناھىيىسى; Chinese: 阿热吐鲁克县), is a county in the northeast of the Xinjiang Uyghur Autonomous Region and is under the administration of the Hami City. It contains an area of 19,511 km^{2} (7,533 sq mi). According to the 2002 census, it has a population of 20,000.

Yiwu was the site of the final battle in mainland China of the Chinese Civil War. There is a monument in Yiwu to a horse who greatly aided the People's Liberation Army during the battle.

== Subdivisions ==
Yiwu County is divided into 3 towns, 3 townships, 1 ethnic township.

Name	Simplified Chinese	Hanyu Pinyin	Uyghur (UEY)	Uyghur Latin (ULY)	Other name	Administrative division code
Towns
Aratürük Town (Yiwu Town)	伊吾镇	Yīwú Zhèn	ئاراتۈرۈك بازىرى	Aratürük baziri		650522100
Nom Town (Naomaohu Town)	淖毛湖镇	Nàomáohú Zhèn	نوم بازىرى	Nom baziri		650522101
Tuzköl Town (Yanchi Town)	盐池镇	Yánchí Zhèn	تۇزكۆل بازىرى	Tuzköl baziri		650522102
Townships
Adakh Township (Weizixia Township)	苇子峡乡	Wěizǐxiá Xiāng	ئاداق يېزىسى	Adaq yëzisi		650522201
Bay Township (Xiamaya Township)	下马崖乡	Xiàmǎyá Xiāng	باي يېزىسى	Bay yëzisi		650522202
Tuhulu Township	吐葫芦乡	Tǔhúlú Xiāng	تۇخۇلۇ يېزىسى	Tuxulu yëzisi		650522204
Ethnic township
Nerinkir Kazakh Ethnic Township	前山哈萨克民族乡	Qiánshān Hǎsàkè Mínzúxiāng	نېرىنكىر قازاق يېزىسى	Nërinkir qazaq yëzisi	(Kazakh) نارىنكىر قازاق اۋىلى; Нарынкыр қазақ ауылы	650522205

== Demographics ==
The proportion of nationalities in Yiwu (Aratürük) County
Nationality	Percentage
Uyghurs	47.3%
Han People	26.6%
Kazakhs	21.9%
Hui People	3.9%
Others	0.3%
Source of the population statistics :

== Geography ==
The Yiwu County is located in the northeastern part of the prefecture, between the Qarliq Shan mountain range (along which it borders on Hami City) and the border with Mongolia's Govi-Altai Province. Outside of the mountain range, most of the county is within the Gobi Desert.

Some of the county important populated places are located in the oases irrigated by the intermittent Yiwu River, which flows north from the mountains, eventually disappearing in the desert. These include, from south to north, Yiwu Town (伊吾镇, the county seat), Weizi Xia Township (苇子峡乡) and Laomao Hu Town (淖毛湖镇).

As of the 1920s, the area of today's Yiwu town was referred to as "Tuhulu" (吐葫芦) and that name is still retained by the Tuhulu Township (吐葫芦乡) adjacent to today's Yiwu town. At the time, it was the first place with an actual river and some agriculture that weary travellers from the east would reach after crossing several hundreds of kilometers of desert (since crossing Edsin Gol, a River in Inner Mongolia).

Other places in the county include Qianshan Kazakh Township (前山哈萨克族乡), Yanchi Township (盐池乡) and Xiamaya Township (下马崖乡).

== Climate ==
Climate data for Yiwu, elevation 1,729 m (5,673 ft), (1991–2020 normals, extremes 1981–2010)
Month	Jan	Feb	Mar	Apr	May	Jun	Jul	Aug	Sep	Oct	Nov	Dec	Year
Record high °C (°F)	10.6 (51.1)	14.3 (57.7)	19.8 (67.6)	27.9 (82.2)	29.0 (84.2)	33.0 (91.4)	33.2 (91.8)	32.5 (90.5)	31.1 (88.0)	23.7 (74.7)	18.9 (66.0)	14.2 (57.6)	33.2 (91.8)
Mean daily maximum °C (°F)	−5.1 (22.8)	−1.6 (29.1)	5.0 (41.0)	13.4 (56.1)	19.4 (66.9)	23.9 (75.0)	25.8 (78.4)	24.5 (76.1)	19.0 (66.2)	10.9 (51.6)	2.8 (37.0)	−3.2 (26.2)	11.2 (52.2)
Daily mean °C (°F)	−12.3 (9.9)	−8.6 (16.5)	−1.8 (28.8)	6.8 (44.2)	12.9 (55.2)	17.8 (64.0)	19.6 (67.3)	17.8 (64.0)	11.9 (53.4)	3.9 (39.0)	−4.0 (24.8)	−10.3 (13.5)	4.5 (40.1)
Mean daily minimum °C (°F)	−17.7 (0.1)	−14.4 (6.1)	−7.9 (17.8)	0.7 (33.3)	6.2 (43.2)	11.3 (52.3)	13.2 (55.8)	11.2 (52.2)	5.5 (41.9)	−1.6 (29.1)	−9.1 (15.6)	−15.5 (4.1)	−1.5 (29.3)
Record low °C (°F)	−29.8 (−21.6)	−28.1 (−18.6)	−25.6 (−14.1)	−15.0 (5.0)	−6.4 (20.5)	1.2 (34.2)	1.9 (35.4)	0.4 (32.7)	−8.4 (16.9)	−15.0 (5.0)	−28.0 (−18.4)	−30.7 (−23.3)	−30.7 (−23.3)
Average precipitation mm (inches)	0.5 (0.02)	0.4 (0.02)	1.9 (0.07)	0.6 (0.02)	1.5 (0.06)	23.5 (0.93)	28.3 (1.11)	16.3 (0.64)	8.2 (0.32)	6.1 (0.24)	2.7 (0.11)	1.1 (0.04)	91.1 (3.58)
Average precipitation days (≥ 0.1 mm)	2.1	1.7	2.4	2.9	4.3	7.1	8.4	5.6	3.6	2.4	2.1	1.8	44.4
Average snowy days	4.3	3.5	4.9	3.1	1.0	0	0	0	0.5	2.6	3.7	3.5	27.1
Average relative humidity (%)	53	47	39	35	33	40	45	44	41	46	51	53	44
Mean monthly sunshine hours	228.1	232.5	278.5	285.5	319.6	294.9	300.1	310.3	294.3	274.7	224.4	212.0	3,254.9
Percentage possible sunshine	78	77	74	70	70	64	65	73	80	82	79	76	74
Source: China Meteorological Administrationall-time September high

Climate data for Naomaohu Town, Yiwu County, elevation 479 m (1,572 ft), (1991–2020 normals)
Month	Jan	Feb	Mar	Apr	May	Jun	Jul	Aug	Sep	Oct	Nov	Dec	Year
Record high °C (°F)	7.7 (45.9)	16.7 (62.1)	26.9 (80.4)	37.3 (99.1)	40.0 (104.0)	44.2 (111.6)	46.2 (115.2)	44.3 (111.7)	39.4 (102.9)	32.7 (90.9)	19.8 (67.6)	10.3 (50.5)	46.2 (115.2)
Mean daily maximum °C (°F)	−4.6 (23.7)	2.7 (36.9)	12.3 (54.1)	22.1 (71.8)	29.5 (85.1)	34.7 (94.5)	36.6 (97.9)	34.6 (94.3)	28.3 (82.9)	18.2 (64.8)	6.4 (43.5)	−3.5 (25.7)	18.1 (64.6)
Daily mean °C (°F)	−11.2 (11.8)	−4.7 (23.5)	4.7 (40.5)	14.5 (58.1)	22.2 (72.0)	27.8 (82.0)	29.7 (85.5)	27.5 (81.5)	20.6 (69.1)	10.8 (51.4)	−0.2 (31.6)	−9.6 (14.7)	11.0 (51.8)
Mean daily minimum °C (°F)	−16.5 (2.3)	−10.9 (12.4)	−2.2 (28.0)	7.2 (45.0)	14.5 (58.1)	20.4 (68.7)	22.8 (73.0)	20.6 (69.1)	13.8 (56.8)	4.6 (40.3)	−5.4 (22.3)	−14.3 (6.3)	4.6 (40.2)
Record low °C (°F)	−29.5 (−21.1)	−24.6 (−12.3)	−16.9 (1.6)	−8.1 (17.4)	0.6 (33.1)	10.4 (50.7)	13.8 (56.8)	6.6 (43.9)	1.1 (34.0)	−9.9 (14.2)	−23.3 (−9.9)	−33.9 (−29.0)	−33.9 (−29.0)
Average precipitation mm (inches)	0.5 (0.02)	0.4 (0.02)	1.9 (0.07)	0.6 (0.02)	1.5 (0.06)	4.9 (0.19)	3.6 (0.14)	3.9 (0.15)	1.8 (0.07)	1.7 (0.07)	1.4 (0.06)	1.2 (0.05)	23.4 (0.92)
Average precipitation days (≥ 0.1 mm)	1.2	0.6	0.7	0.5	1.0	2.0	3.1	1.8	1.2	0.7	0.8	1.4	15
Average snowy days	1.9	1.1	0.5	0	0	0	0	0	0	0	0.7	2.2	6.4
Average relative humidity (%)	53	39	28	21	20	22	26	26	26	33	43	54	33
Mean monthly sunshine hours	214.5	225.4	288.0	306.4	348.3	334.7	333.4	326.2	301.9	277.5	218.8	194.4	3,369.5
Percentage possible sunshine	74	75	77	75	76	73	72	77	82	83	77	70	76
Source: China Meteorological Administrationall-time extreme
