= Kushan art =

Art of the Kushan Empire

Kushan art

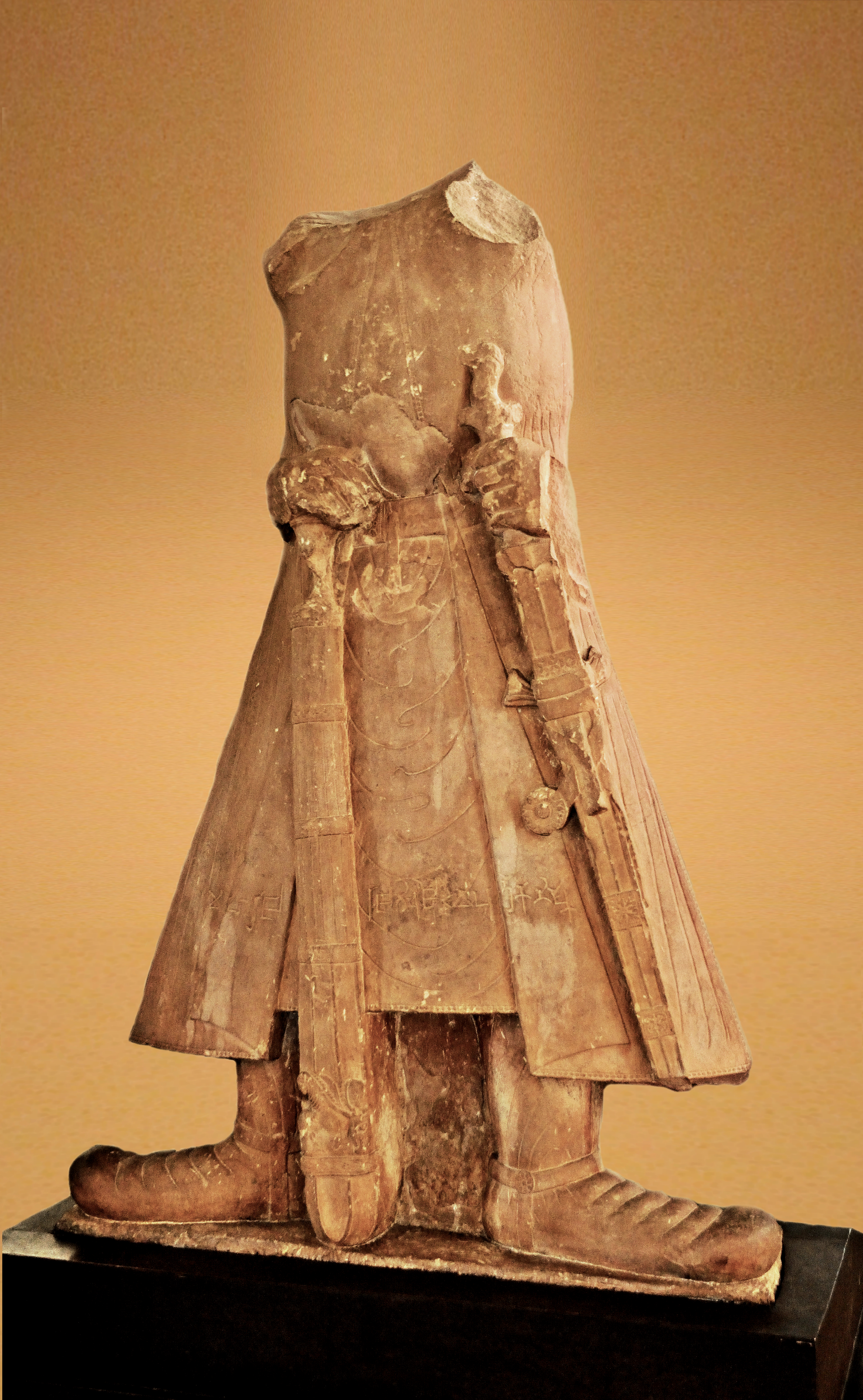
Statue of Kushan emperor Kanishka I in long coat and boots, holding a mace and a sword, in the Mathura Museum. An inscription runs along the bottom of the coat.

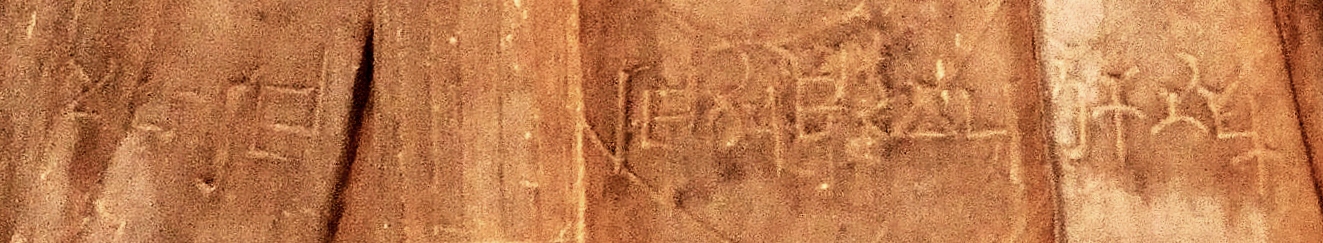
The inscription is in middle Brahmi script:

Mahārāja Rājadhirāja Devaputra Kāṇiṣka
"The Great King, King of Kings, Son of God, Kanishka".
Mathura art, Mathura Museum

Kushan art, the art of the Kushan Empire in northern India, flourished between the 1st and the 4th century CE. It blended the traditions of the Greco-Buddhist art of Gandhara, influenced by Hellenistic artistic canons, and the more Indian art of Mathura. Kushan art follows the Hellenistic art of the Greco-Bactrian Kingdom as well as Indo-Greek art which had been flourishing between the 3rd century BCE and 1st century CE in Bactria and northwestern India, and the succeeding Indo-Scythian art. Before invading northern and central India and establishing themselves as a full-fledged empire, the Kushans had migrated from northwestern China and occupied for more than a century these Central Asian lands, where they are thought to have assimilated remnants of Greek populations, Greek culture, and Greek art, as well as the languages and scripts which they used in their coins and inscriptions: Greek and Bactrian, which they used together with the Indian Brahmi script.

With the demise of the Kushans in the 4th century CE, the Indian Gupta Empire prevailed, and Gupta art developed. The Gupta Empire incorporated vast portions of central, northern, and northwestern India, as far as Punjab and the Arabian Sea, continuing and expanding on the earlier artistic tradition of the Kushans and developing a unique Gupta style.

== Dynastic art of the Kushans ==
Some traces remain of the presence of the Kushans in the areas of Bactria and Sogdiana. Archaeological structures are known in Takht-I-Sangin, Surkh Kotal (a monumental temple), and the palace of Khalchayan. Various sculptures and friezes are known representing horse-riding archers and, significantly, men with artificially deformed skulls, such as the Kushan prince of Khalchayan (a practice well attested in nomadic Central Asia).

=== Khalchayan (1st century BCE) ===
Kushan art at Khalchayan
(1st century BCE)

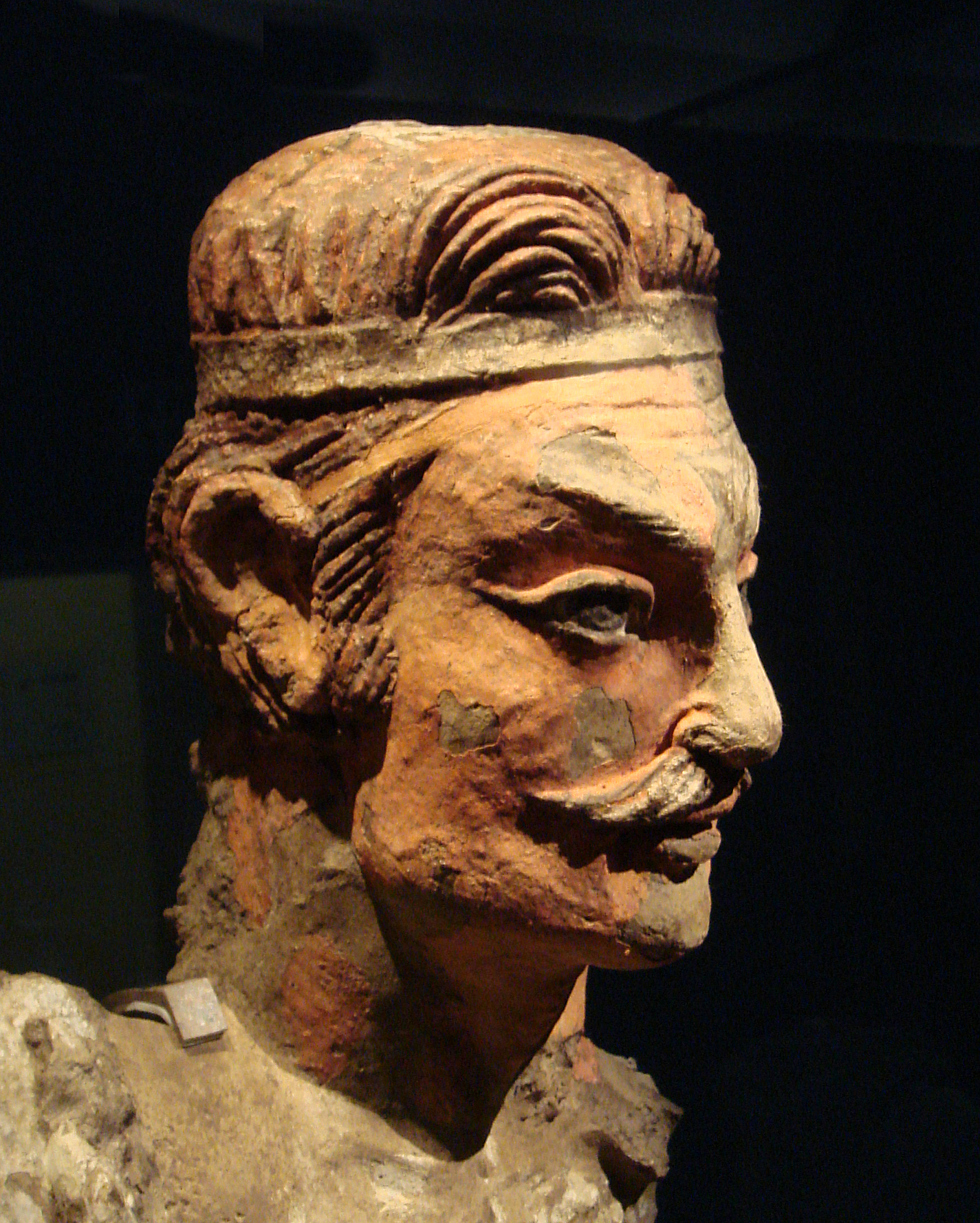
Head of a Yuezhi prince (Khalchayan palace, Uzbekistan).

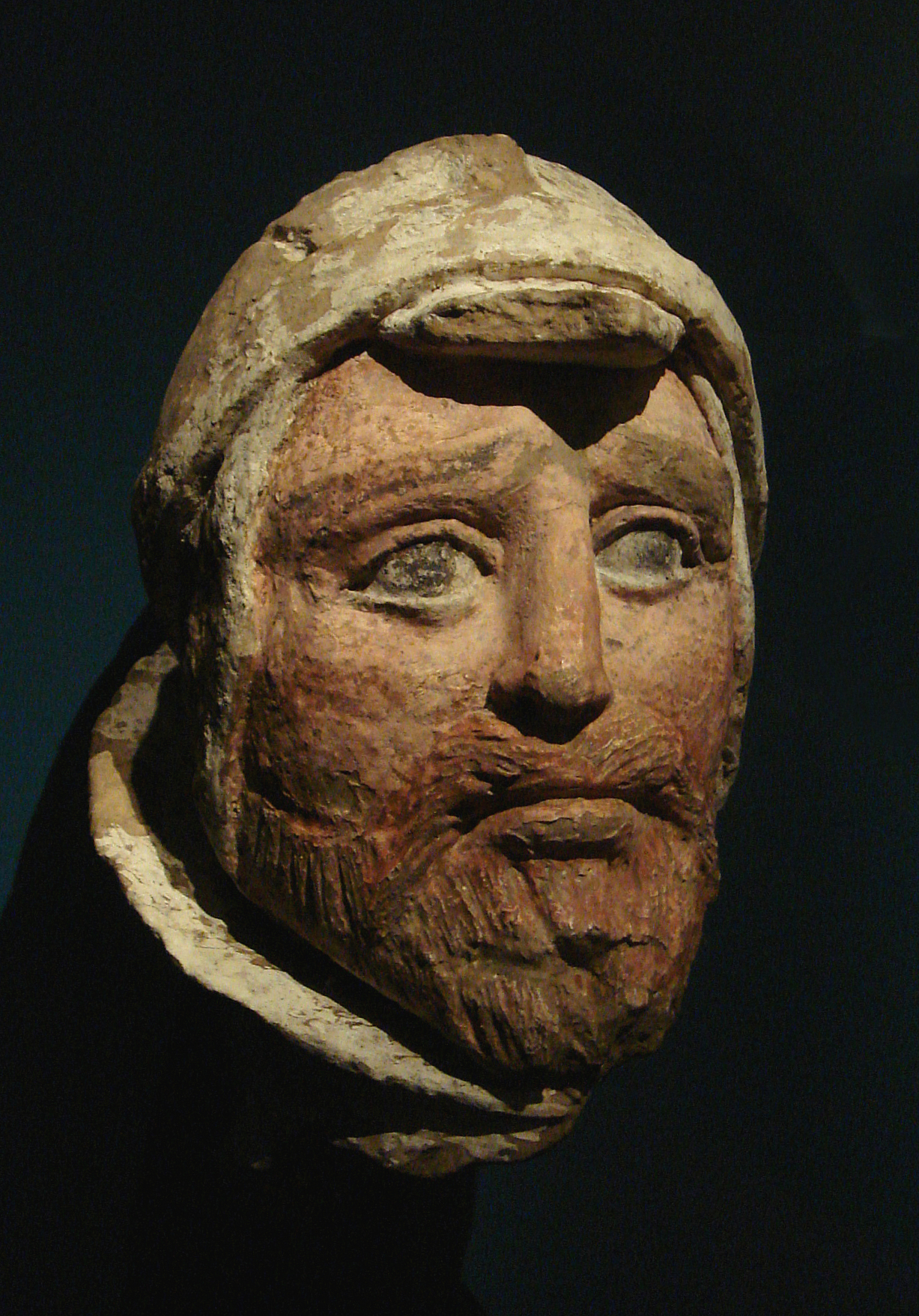
Head of a Saka warrior, as a defeated enemy of the Yuezhi, Khalchayan.

The art of Khalchayan at the end of the 2nd-1st century BCE is probably one of the first known manifestations of Kushan art. It is ultimately derived from Hellenistic art and possibly from the art of the cities of Ai-Khanoum and Nysa. At Khalchayan, rows of in-the-round terracotta statues showed Kushan princes in dignified attitudes, while some of the sculptural scenes are thought to depict the Kushans fighting against the Sakas. The Yuezis are shown with a majestic demeanour, whereas the Sakas are typically represented with side-whiskers, displaying expressive and sometimes grotesque features.

According to Benjamin Rowland, the styles and ethnic type visible in Kalchayan already anticipate the characteristics of the later Art of Gandhara and may even have been at the origin of its development. Rowland particularly draws attention to the similarity of the ethnic types represented at Khalchayan, in the art of Gandhara, and in the style of portraiture itself. For example, Rowland find a great proximity between the famous head of a Yuezhi prince from Khalchayan, and the head of Gandharan Bodhisattvas, giving the example of the Gandharan head of a Bodhisattva in the Philadelphia Museum of Art. The similarity of the Gandhara Bodhisattva with the portrait of the Kushan ruler Heraios is also striking. According to Rowland, the Bactrian art of Khalchayan thus survived for several centuries through its influence in the art of Gandhara, thanks to the patronage of the Kushans.

=== Bactria and India (1st-2nd century CE) ===
The Kushans favoured royal portraiture, as can be seen in their coins and dynastic sculptures. A monumental sculpture of King Kanishka I has been found in Mathura in northern India, which is characterized by its frontality and martial stance, as he holds firmly his sword and a mace. His heavy coat and riding boots are typically nomadic Central Asian and are way too heavy for the warm climate of India. His coat is decorated by hundreds of pearls, which probably symbolize his wealth. His grandiose regnal title is inscribed with the Brahmi script: "The Great King, King of Kings, Son of God, Kanishka".

As the Kushans gradually assimilated into Indian society, their attire became lighter and their depictions more natural, moving away from frontal representation. However, they still retained distinctive elements of their nomadic dress, including trousers, boots, heavy tunics, and robust belts.

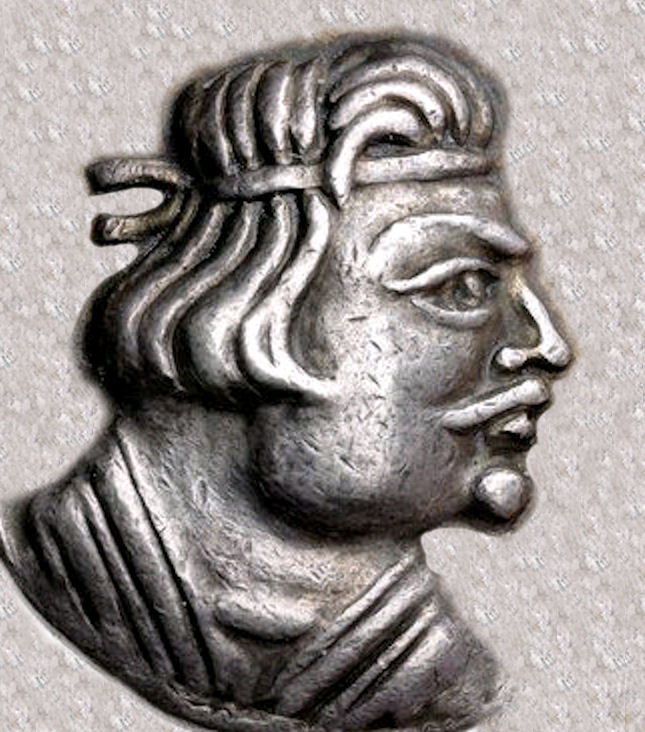
Early Kushan ruler Heraios (1–30 CE), from his coinage.

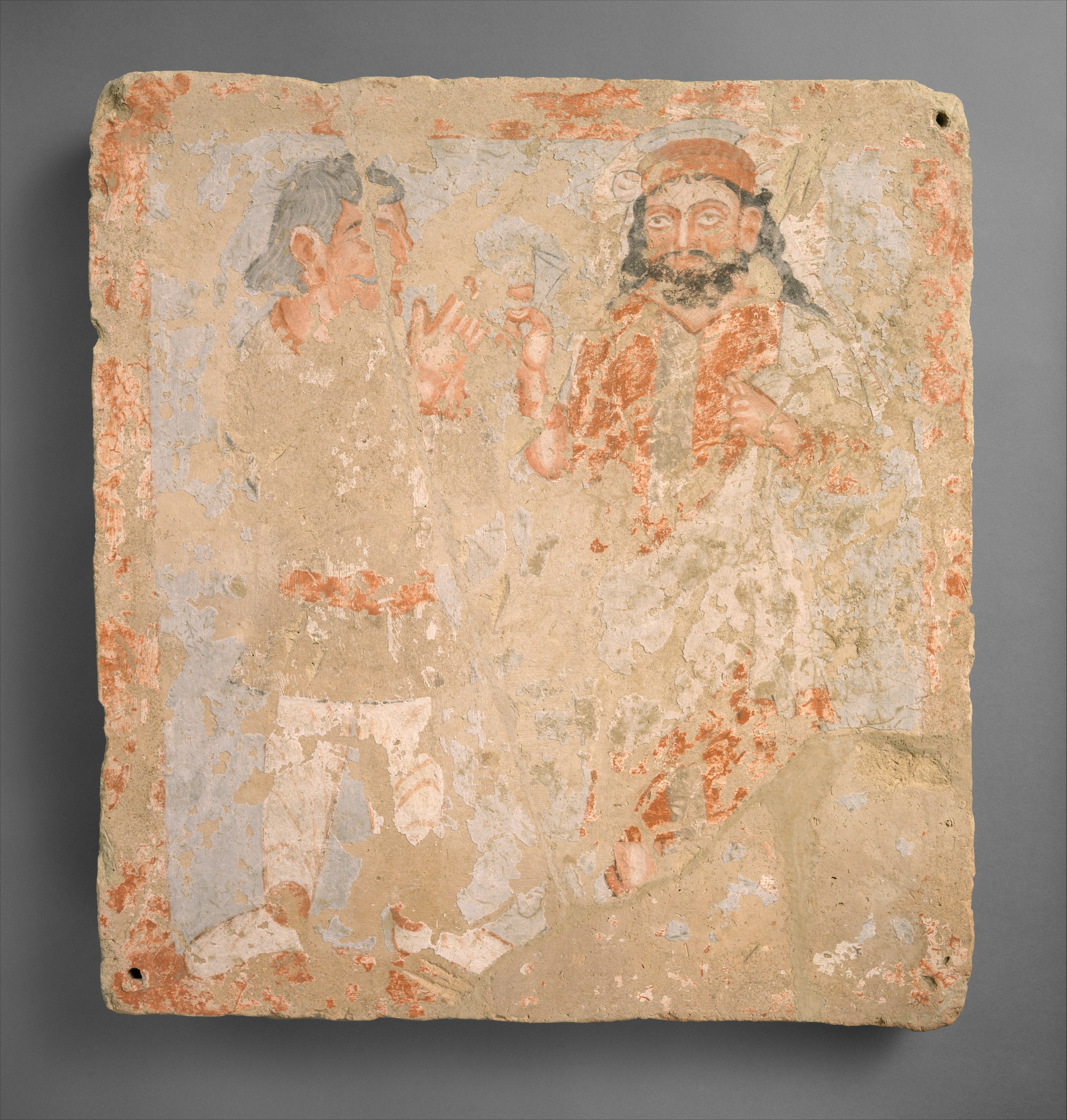
Kushan worshiper with deity Zeus/ Serapis/ Ohrmazd, Bactria, 3rd century CE.

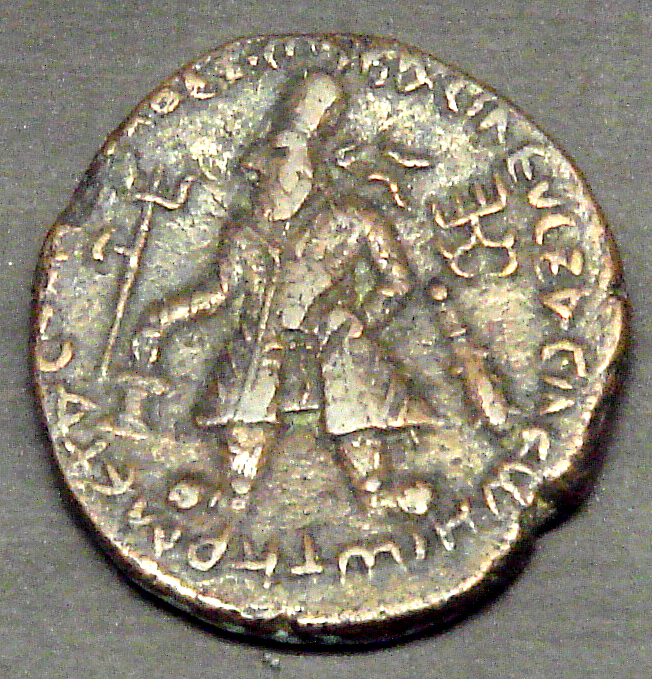
Vima Kadphises in full dress on his coinage in the Greek language, 1st century CE

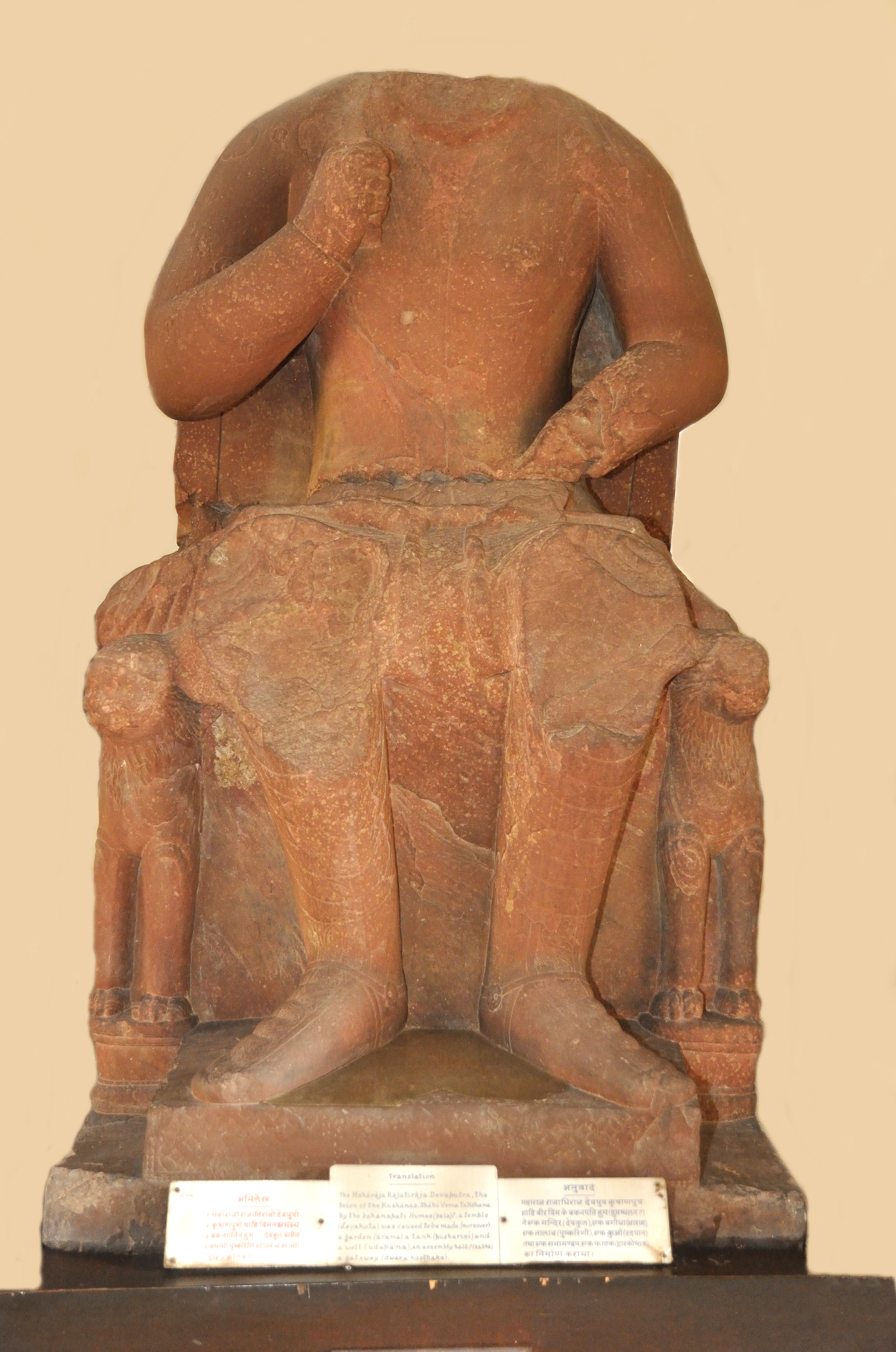
Monumental statue of Vima Kadphises, 1st century CE

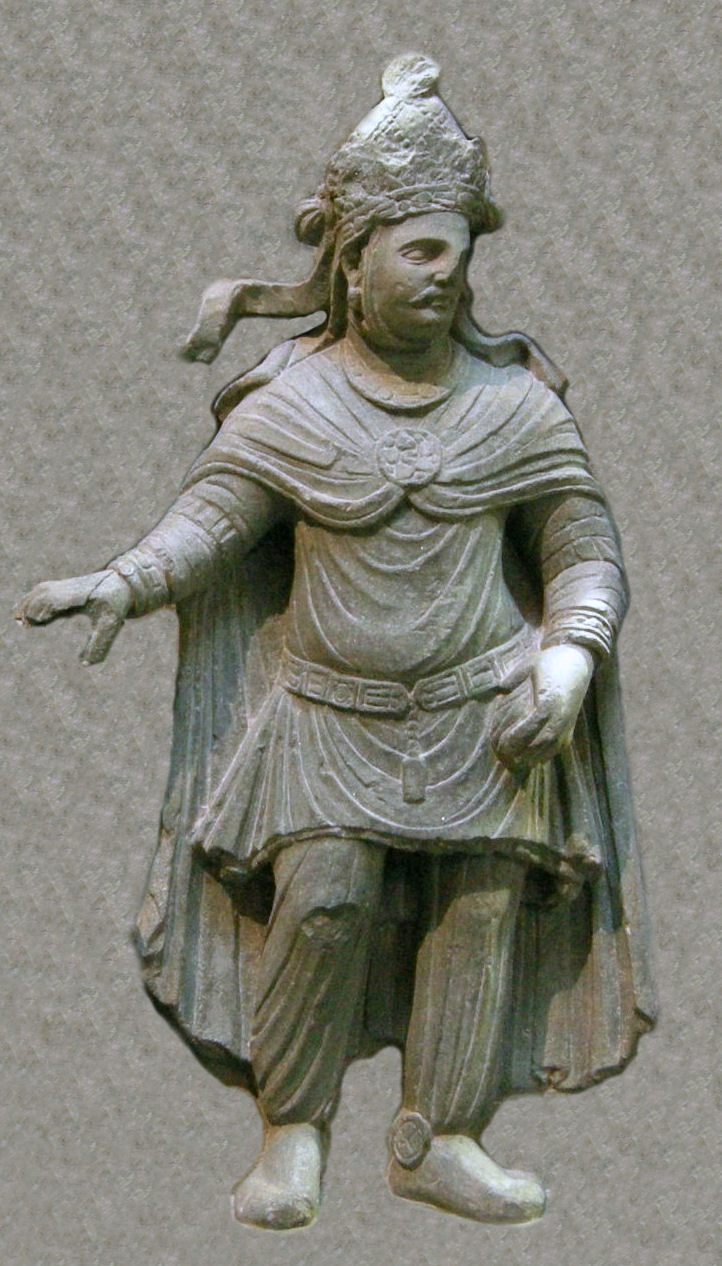
Kushan king or prince, said to be Huvishka (150–180 CE), Gandhara art.

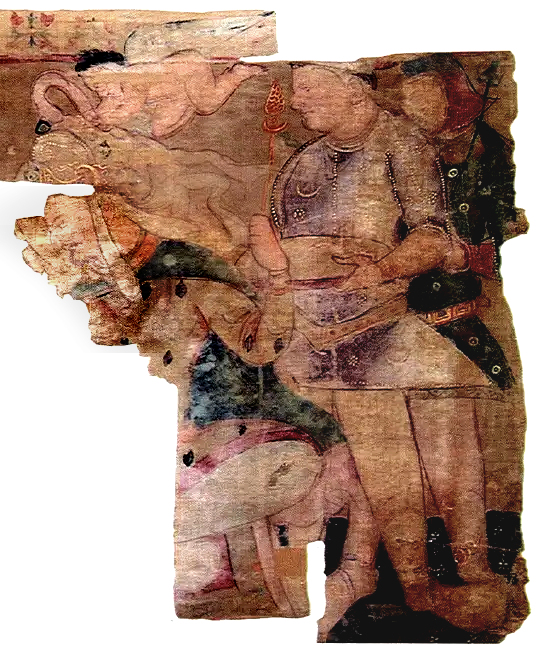
Painting of a Kushan ruler (probably Huvishka, seated) and attendants, Bactria, 74-258 CE.

== Art of Gandhara under the Kushans ==
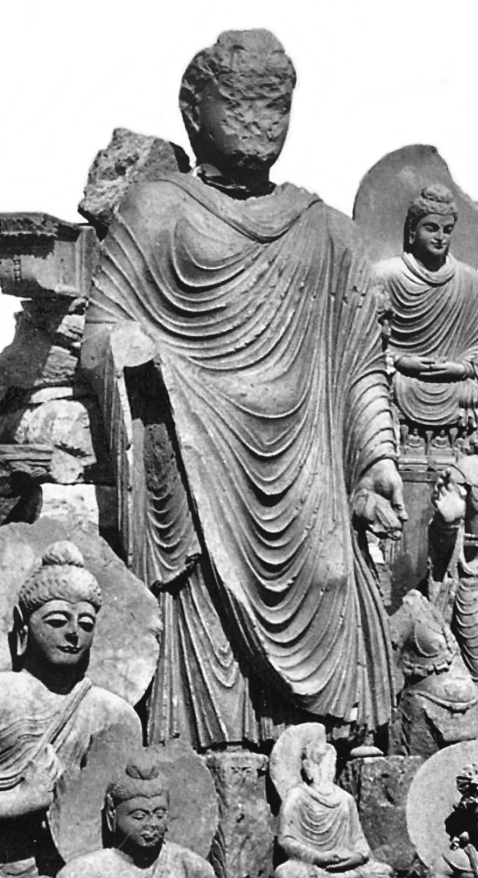
Statues of the type of the Loriyan Tangai buddha, dated to 143 CE, during the reign of Kanishka I. The features are already rather late, and show a degeneration compared to more classical types: the drapery is already not as three-dimensional, and the head is large and broad-jawed.

Kushan art blended the traditions of the Greco-Buddhist art of Gandhara, influenced by Hellenistic artistic canons, and the more Indian art of Mathura. Most of the Greco-Buddhist art of Gandhara is thought to have been produced by the Kushans, starting from the end of the 1st century CE.

The Kushans were eclectic in their religions, venerating tens of Gods from Iranian, Greek, or Indian traditions as can be seen on their coins. It is thought that this tolerant religious climate, together with an openness towards visual arts encouraged the creation of innovative figural art in the Jain, Buddhist, and Brahmanic traditions. The Buddha was only represented with symbols in earlier Indian art as in Sanchi or Bharhut. The first known representations of the Buddha seem to appear before the arrival of the Kushans, as shown with the Bimaran casket, but Buddhist art undoubtedly flourished under their rule, and most of the known early statues of the Buddha dated to the period of the Kushans.

The characteristics of early Kushan art in depicting the Buddha can be ascertained through the study of several statues bearing dated inscriptions. Some statues of the standing Buddha with inscriptions dating them to 143 CE, such as the Loriyan Tangai buddha, show that the features of that time are already rather late and somewhat degenerate compared to more classical types: the figure of the Buddha is comparatively more stout, shorter and broader, the drapery is already not as three-dimensional, and the head is large and broad-jawed.

Numerous Kushan devotees, with their characteristic Central Asia costume, can be seen on the Buddhist statuary of Gandhara and Mathura:

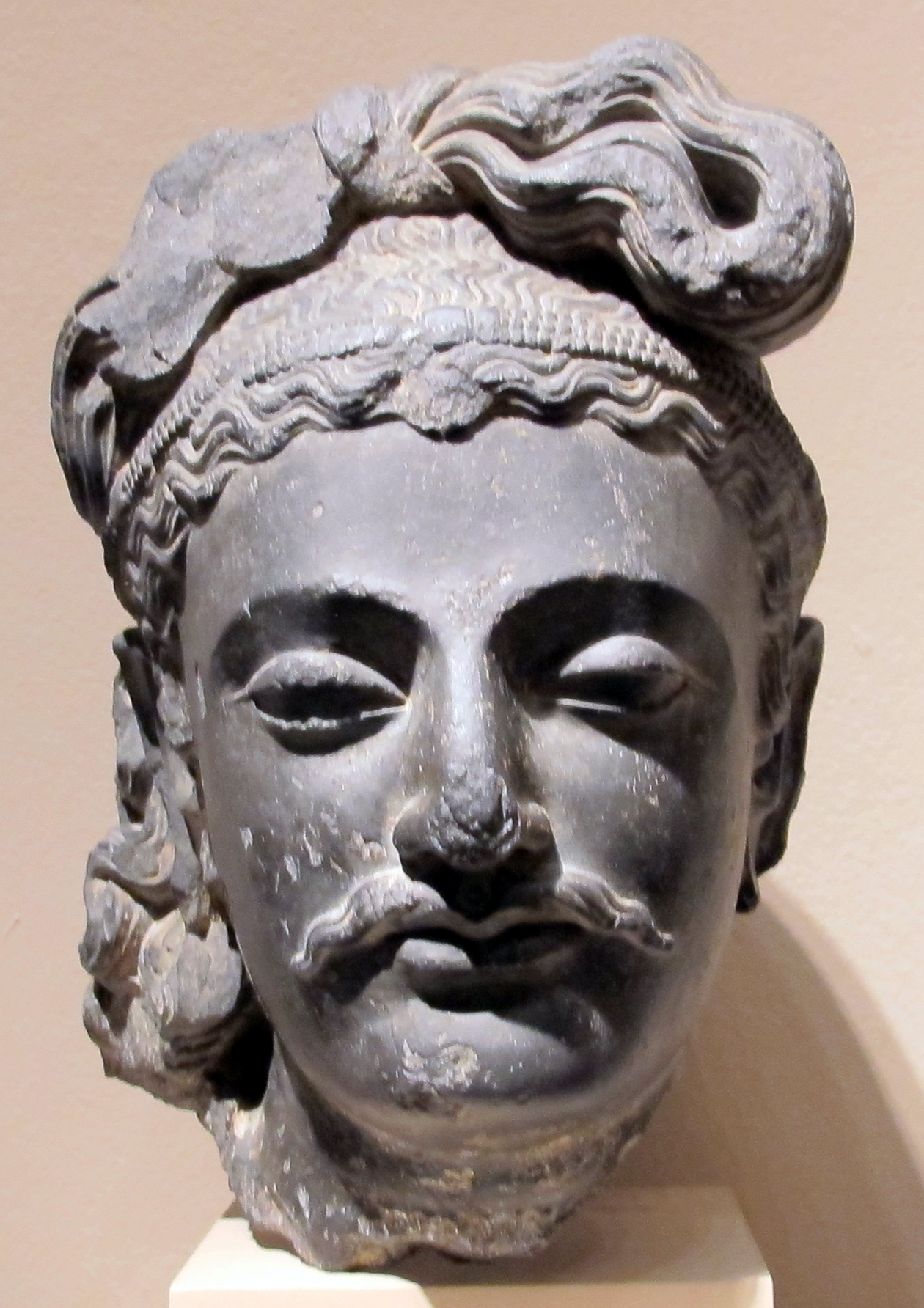
Head of a Bodhisattva, said to reproduce the Kushan princely types seen in Khalchayan. Philadelphia Museum of Art

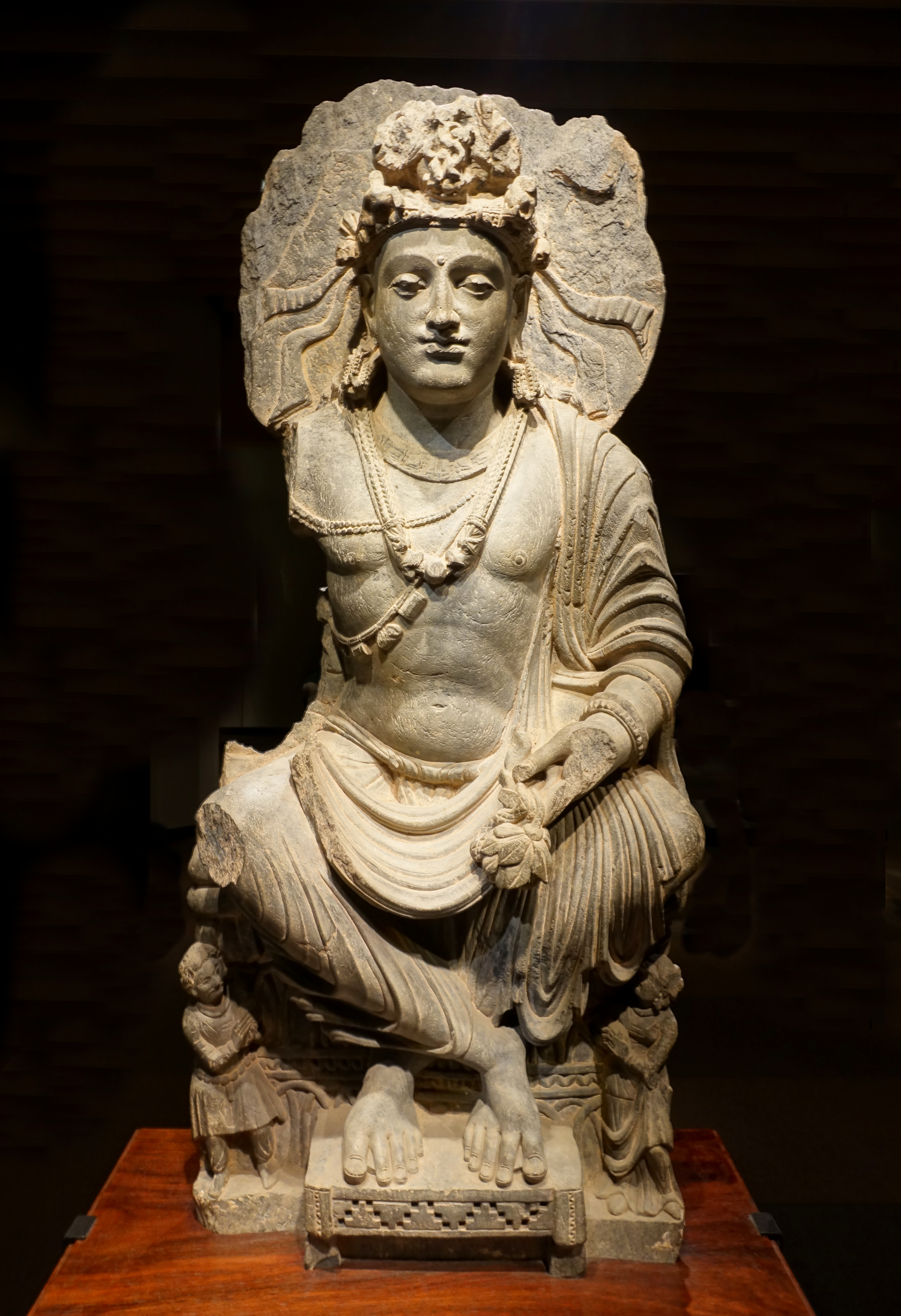
Maitreya, with Kushan devotee couple at his feet. 2nd century, Mardan, Gandhara.

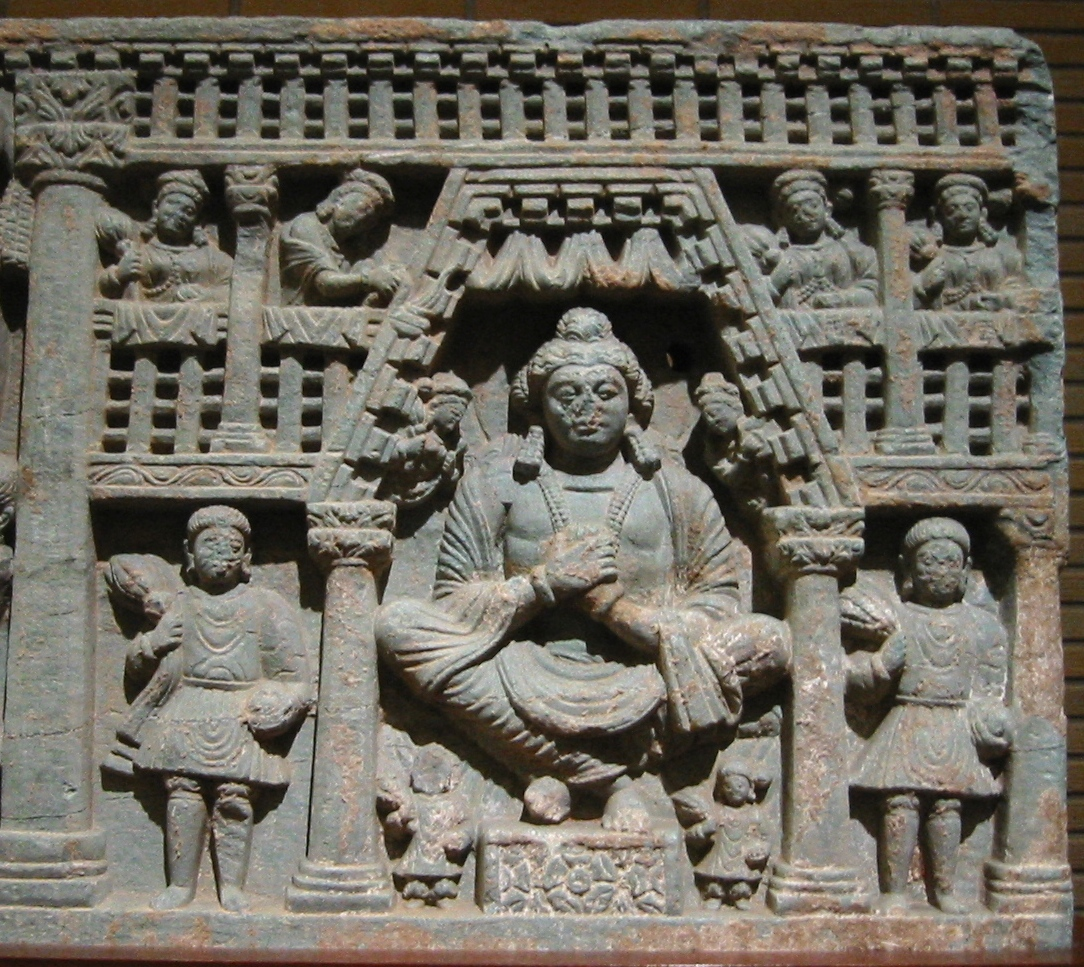
Maitreya, with Kushan devotees, left and right. 2nd century Gandhara.

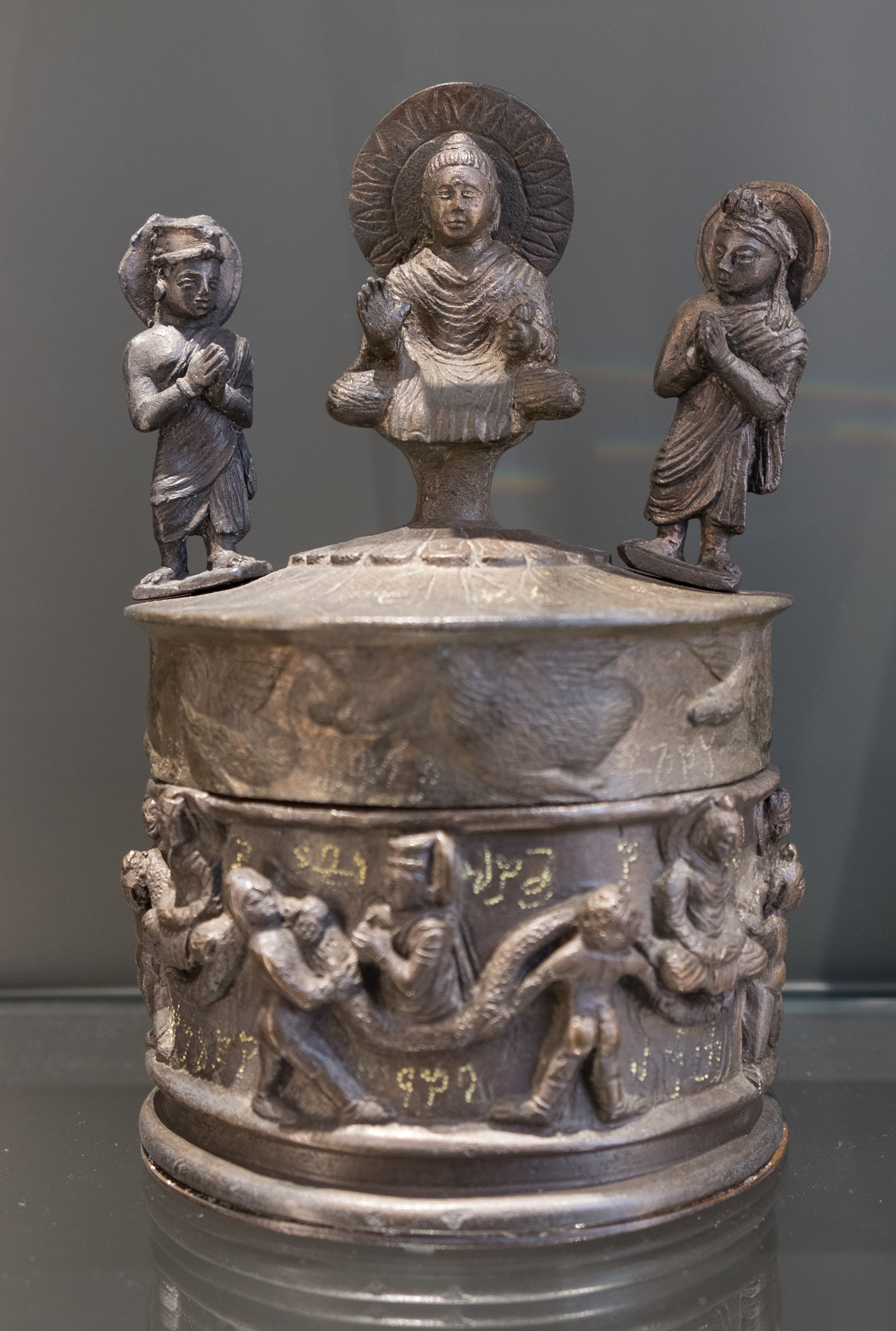
The "Kanishka casket," with the Buddha surrounded by Brahma and Indra, and Kanishka on the lower part, 127 CE.

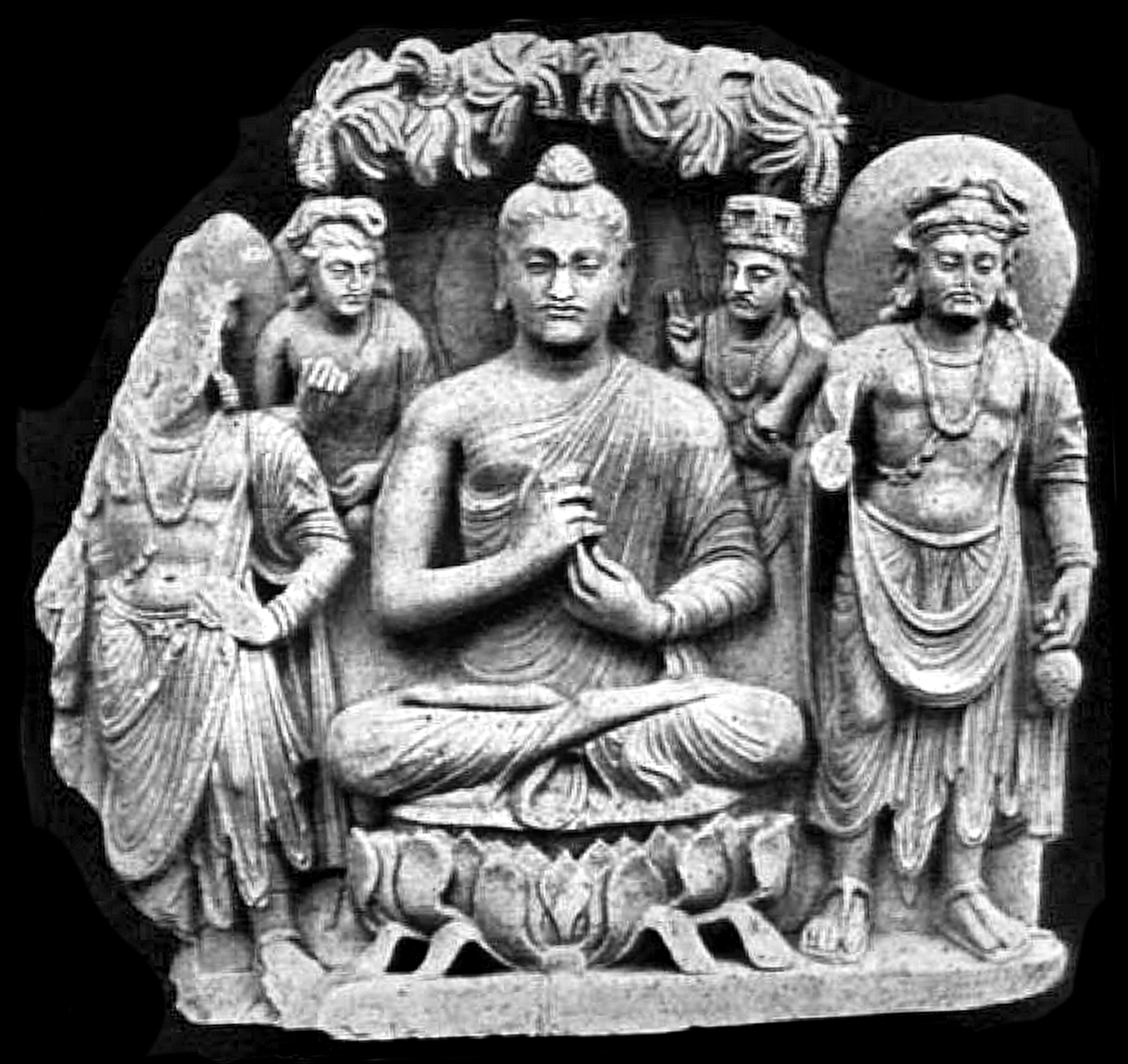
A seated Buddha triad from Sahr-i-Bahlol, similar to the Brussels Buddha, possibly dated to 132 CE. Peshawar Museum.

== Art of Mathura under the Kushans ==
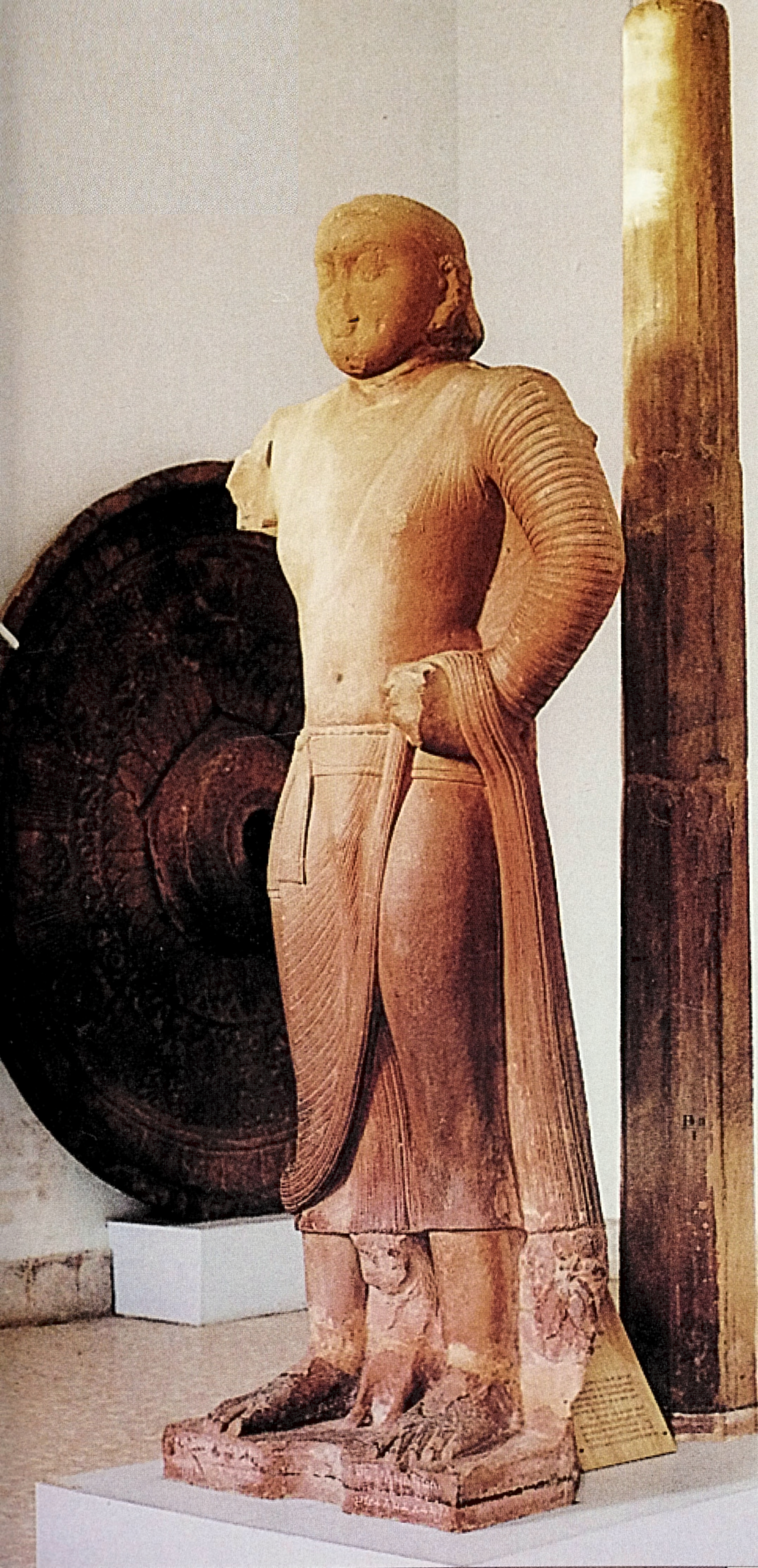
The "Bala Bodhisattva" with shaft and chatra umbrella, dedicated in "the year 3 of Kanishka" (circa 130 CE) by "brother (Bhikshu) Bala". The right arm would have been raised in a salutation gesture. Sarnath Museum.

From the time of Vima Kadphises or Kanishka I the Kushans established one of their capitals at Mathura in northern India. Mathura already had an important artistic tradition by that time, but the Kushan greatly developed its production, especially through Buddhist art. A few sculptures of the Buddha, such as the "Isapur Buddha" are known from Mathura from circa 15 CE, well before the arrival of the Kushans, at a time when the Northern Satrap Sodasa still ruled in Mathura, but the style and symbolism of these early depictions were still tentative. The Kushans standardized the symbolism of these early Buddha statues, developing their attributes and aesthetic qualities in an exuberant manner and on an unprecedentedly large scale.

=== Bodhisattvas ===
The style of the statues of Bodhisattvas at Mathura is somewhat reminiscent of the earlier monumental Yaksha statues, usually dated one or two centuries earlier. The Greco-Buddhist art of Gandhara, although belonging to the same realm under the Kushans, seems to have had only limited influence on these creations. Some authors consider that Hellenistic influence appears in the liveliness and the realistic details of the figures (an evolution compared to the stiffness of Mauryan art), the use of perspective from 150 BCE, iconographical details such as the knot and the club of Heracles, the wavy folds of the dresses, or the depiction of bacchanalian scenes. The art of Mathura became extremely influential over the rest of India, and was "the most prominent artistic production center from the second century BCE".

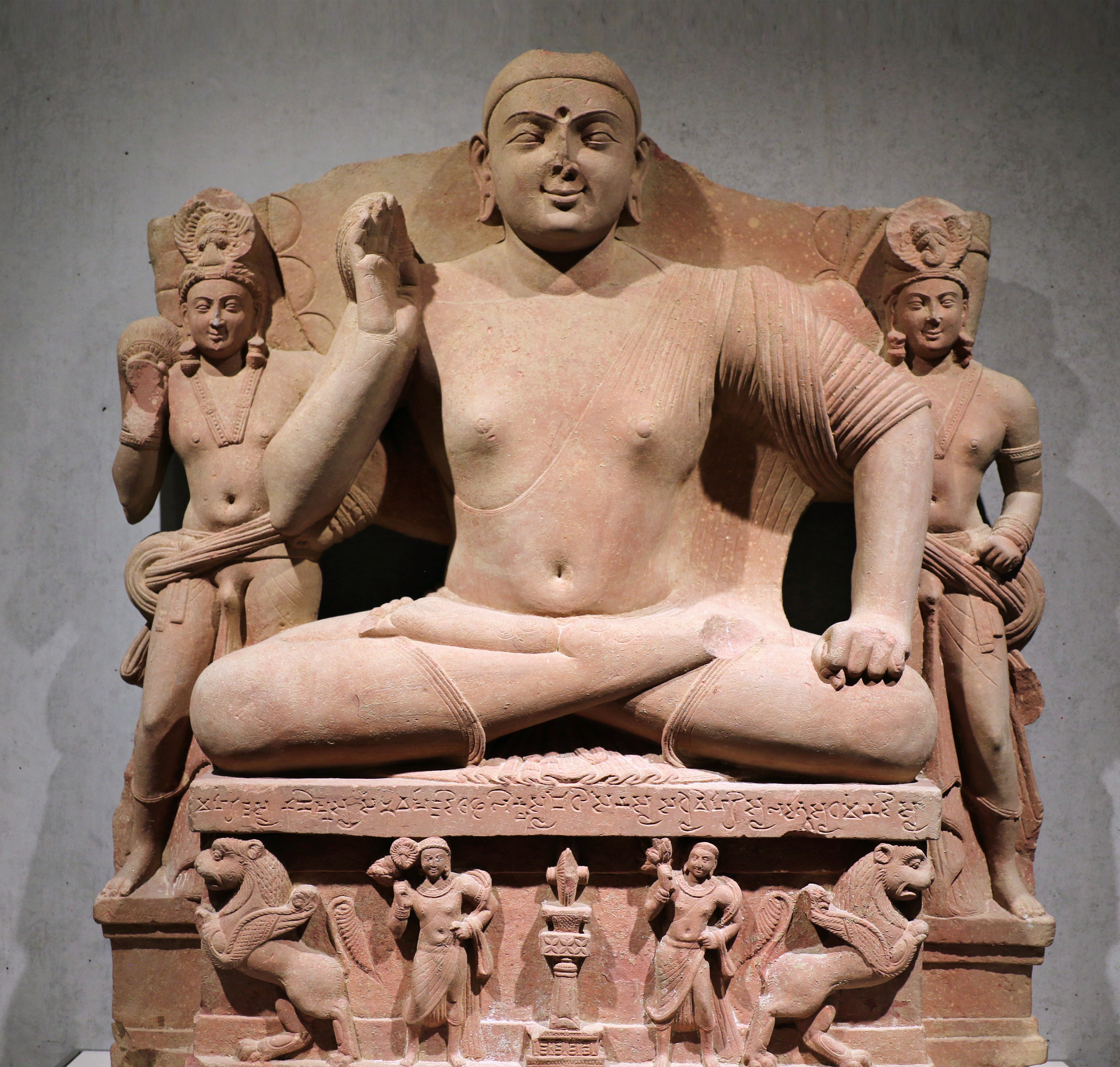
The Kimbell seated Bodhisattva, with an inscription "in year 4 of Kanishka".

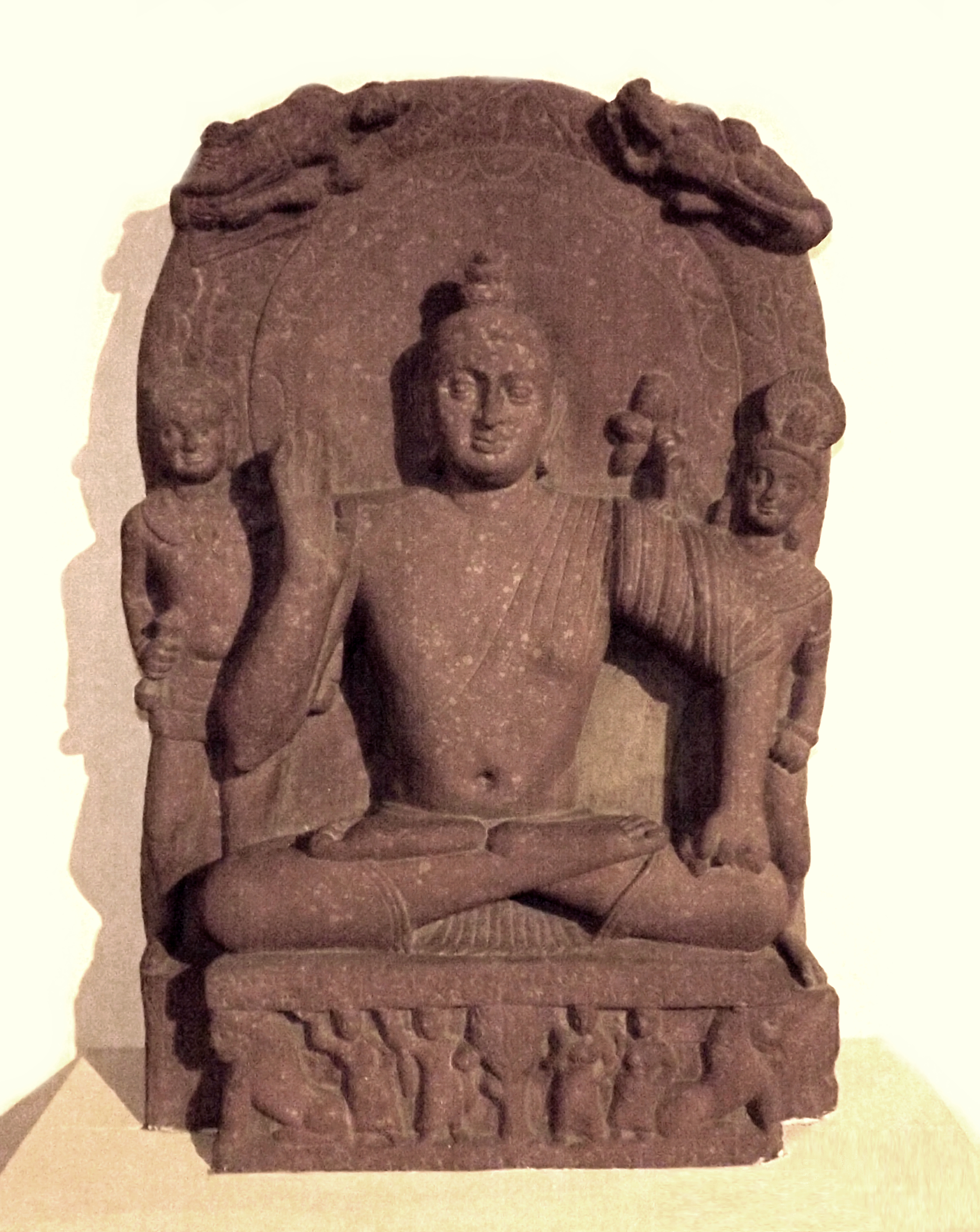
Seated Bodhisattva, inscribed "Year 32" of Kanishka (159 CE), Mathura.

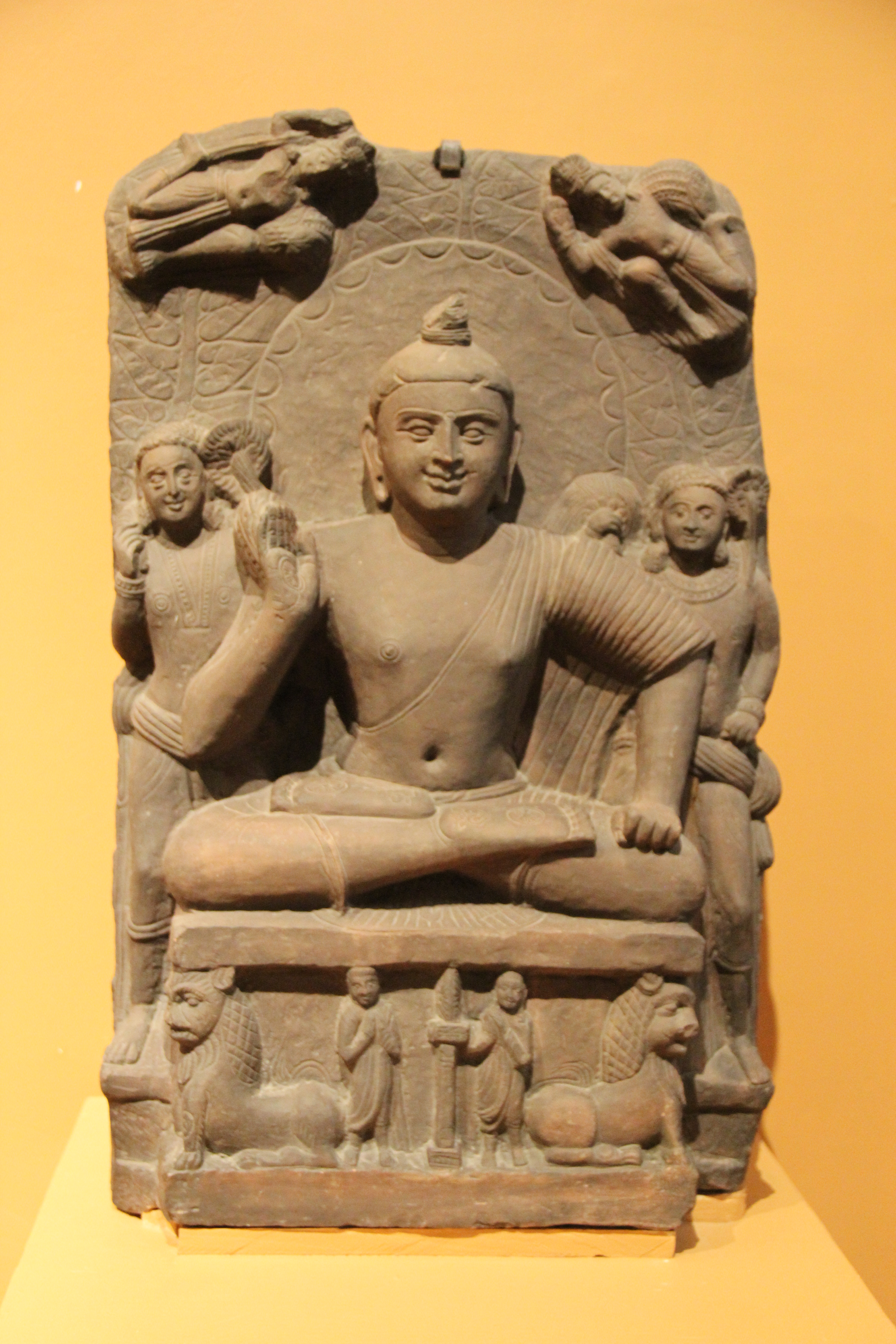
Seated Bodhisattva, uninscribed.

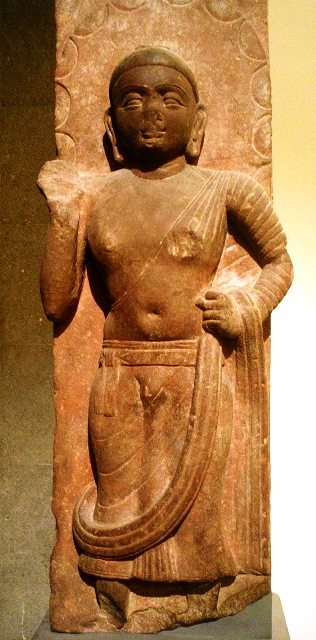
A Bodhisattva, 2nd century, Mathura

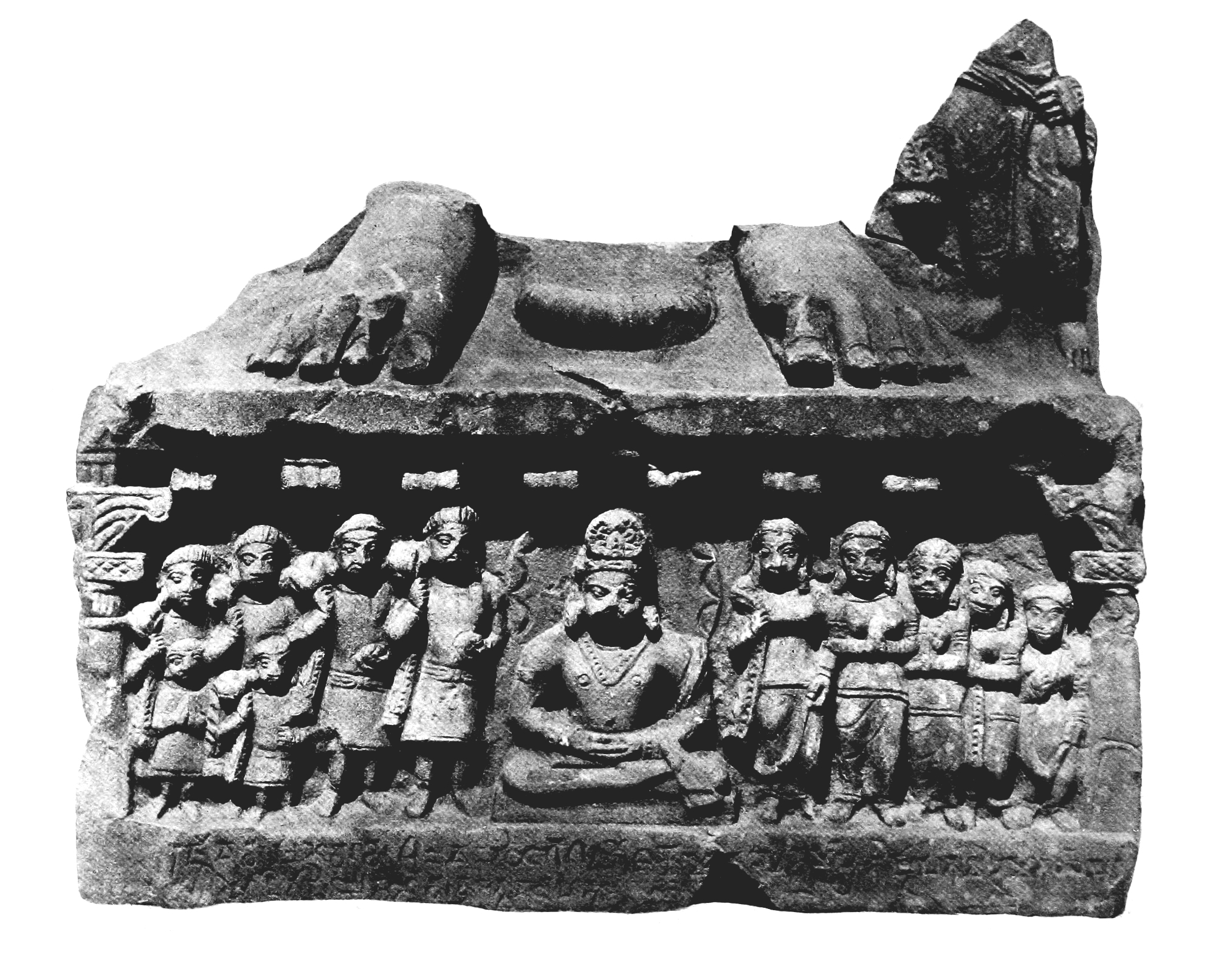
Kushan devotees around a Bodhisattva, on a Buddha pedestal. Reign of Vāsishka, Mathura, circa 250 CE.

=== Standing Buddhas ===
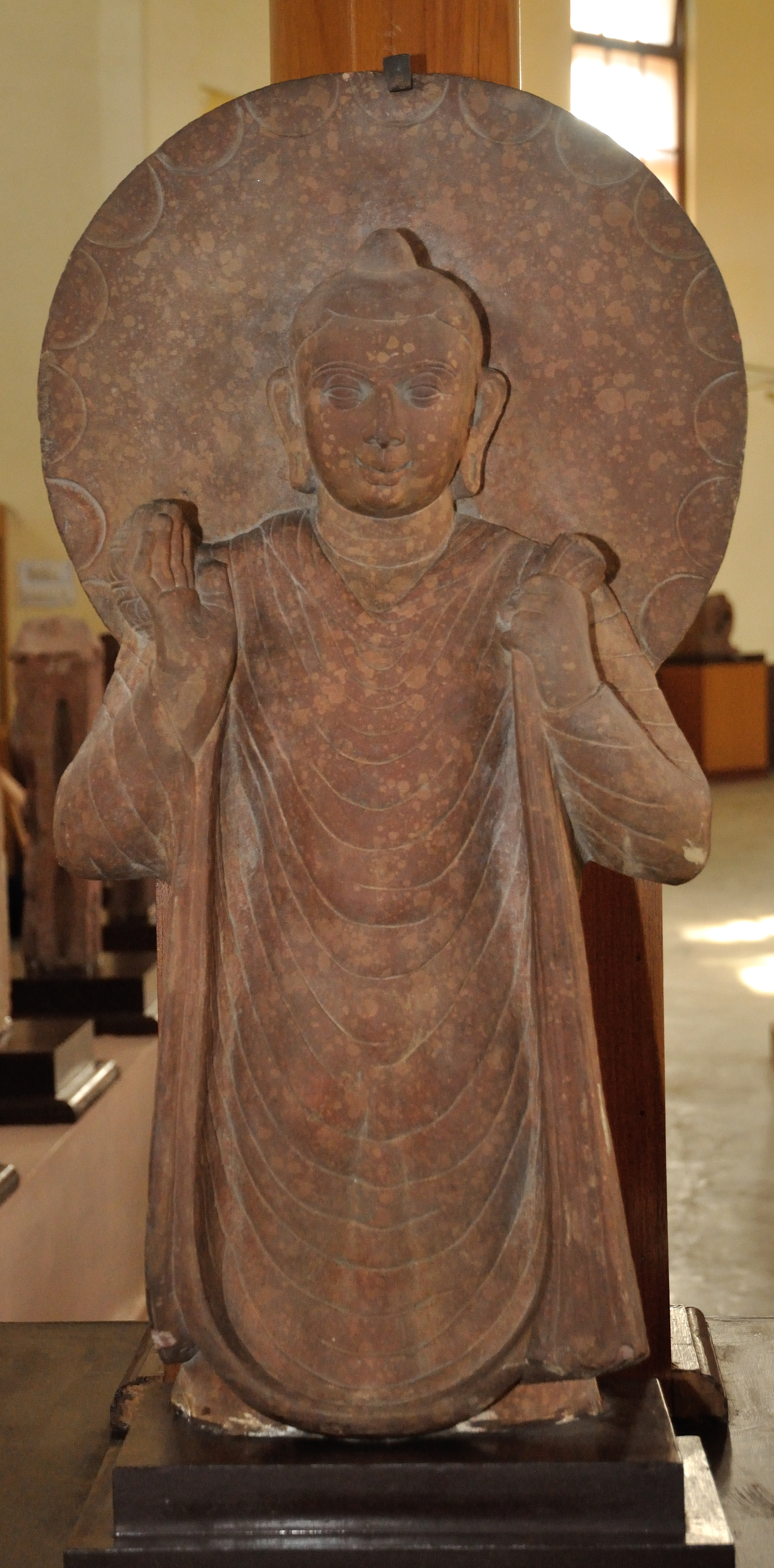
A Mathura standing Buddha, circa 2nd century CE, Mathura Museum

The Mathura standing Buddha seems to be a slightly later development compared to the Bodhisattvas of the type of the Bala Bodhisattva. Although several are dated to the 2nd century CE, they often tend to display characteristics that would become the hallmark of Gupta art, especially the very thin dress seemingly sticking to the body of the Buddha. These statues of the standing Buddha however tend to display characteristic and attitudes more readily seen in the Greco-Buddhist art of Gandhara: the head of the Buddha is surrounded by a halo, the clothing covers both shoulders, the left hand hold the gown of the Buddha while the other hand form an Abbhiya mudra, and the folds in the clothing are more typical of the Gandharan styles.

In many respect, the standing Buddha of Mathura seems to be a combination of the local sculptural tradition initiated by the Yakshas with the Hellenistic designs of the Buddhas from the Greco-Buddhist art of Gandhara.

=== Other sculptural works ===
The Mathura sculptures incorporate many Hellenistic elements, such as the general idealistic realism, and key design elements such as the curly hair, and folded garment. Specific Mathuran adaptations tend to reflect warmer climatic conditions, as they consist in a higher fluidity of the clothing, which progressively tends to cover only one shoulder instead of both. Facial types also tend to become more Indianized. Banerjee in Hellenism in ancient India describes "the mixed character of the Mathura School in which we find on the one hand, a direct continuation of the old Indian art of Barhut and Sanchi and on the other hand, the classical influence derived from Gandhara".

In some cases however, a clear influence from the art of Gandhara can also be felt, as in the case of the "Mathura Herakles", a Hellenistic statue of Herakles strangling the Nemean lion, discovered in Mathura, and now in the Kolkota Indian Museum, as well as Bacchanalian scenes. Although inspired from the art of Gandhara, the portraiture of Herakles is not perfectly exact and may show a lack of understanding of the subject matter, as Herakles is shown already wearing the skin of the lion he is fighting.

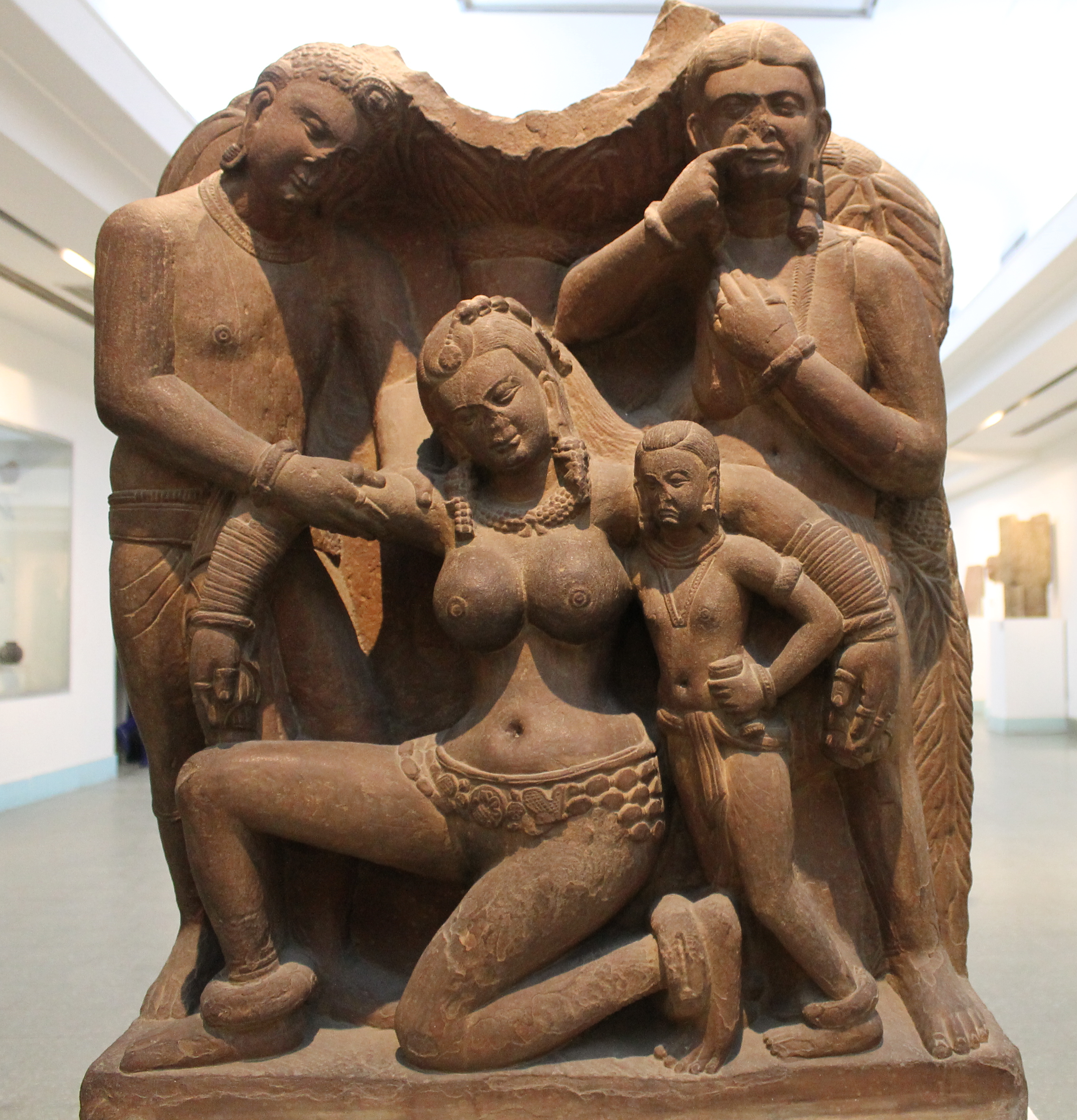
Bacchanalian scene. Mathura

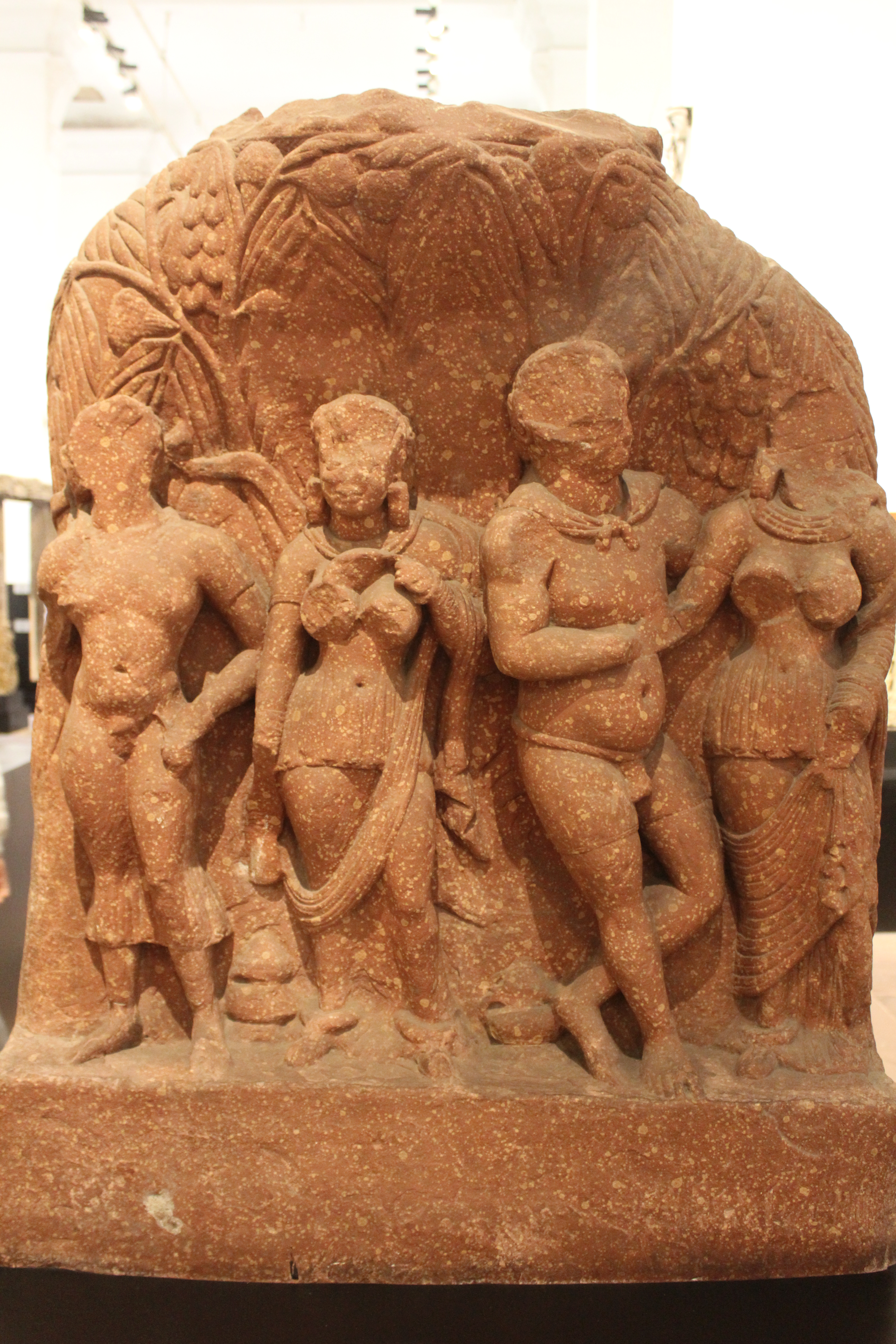
Bacchanalian, with women in Greek dress. Mathura

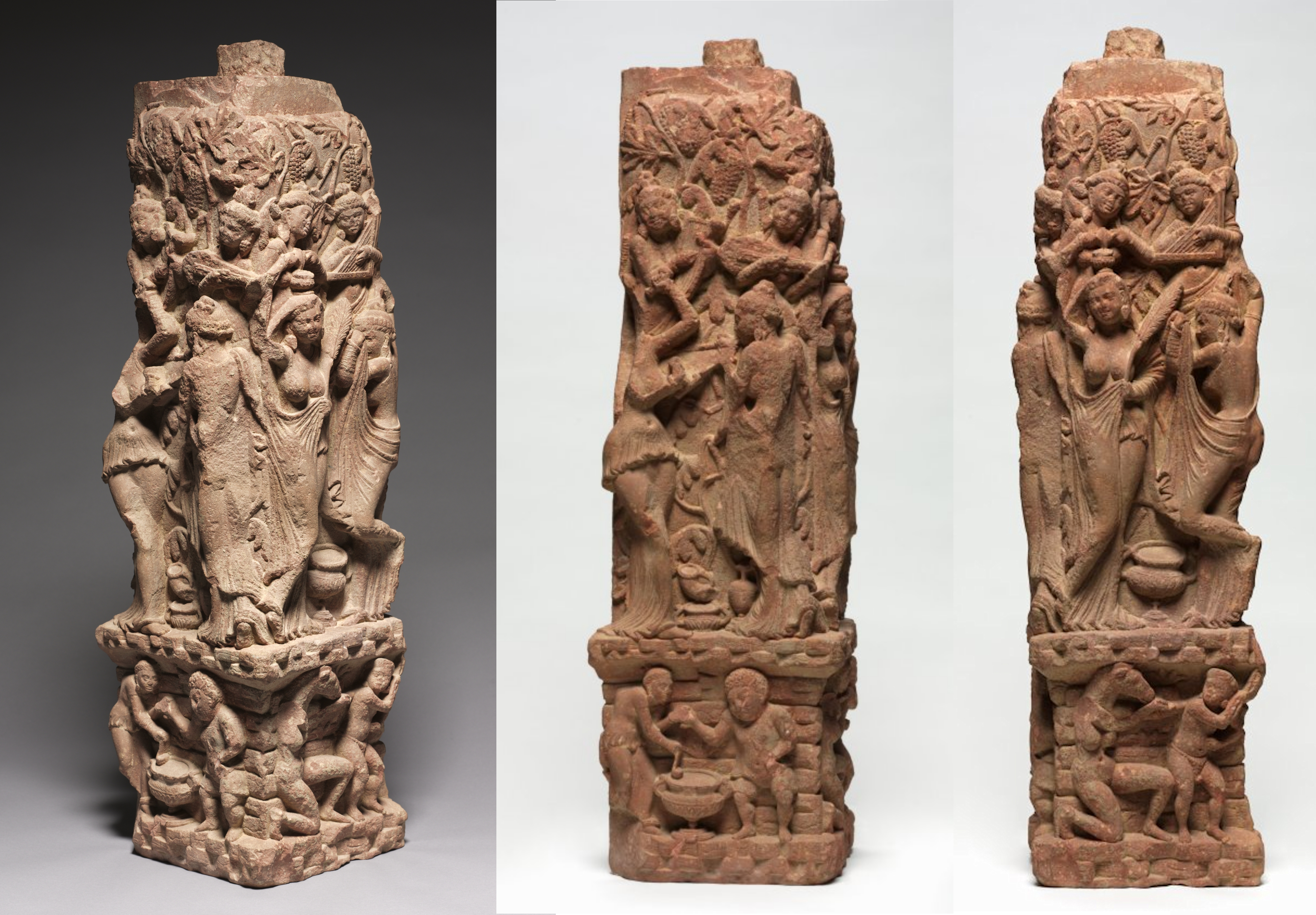
Corner railing pillar with drinking scenes, Yakshis, and Musicians, incorporating Hellenistic elements. Mathura, Kushan period circa 100 CE.

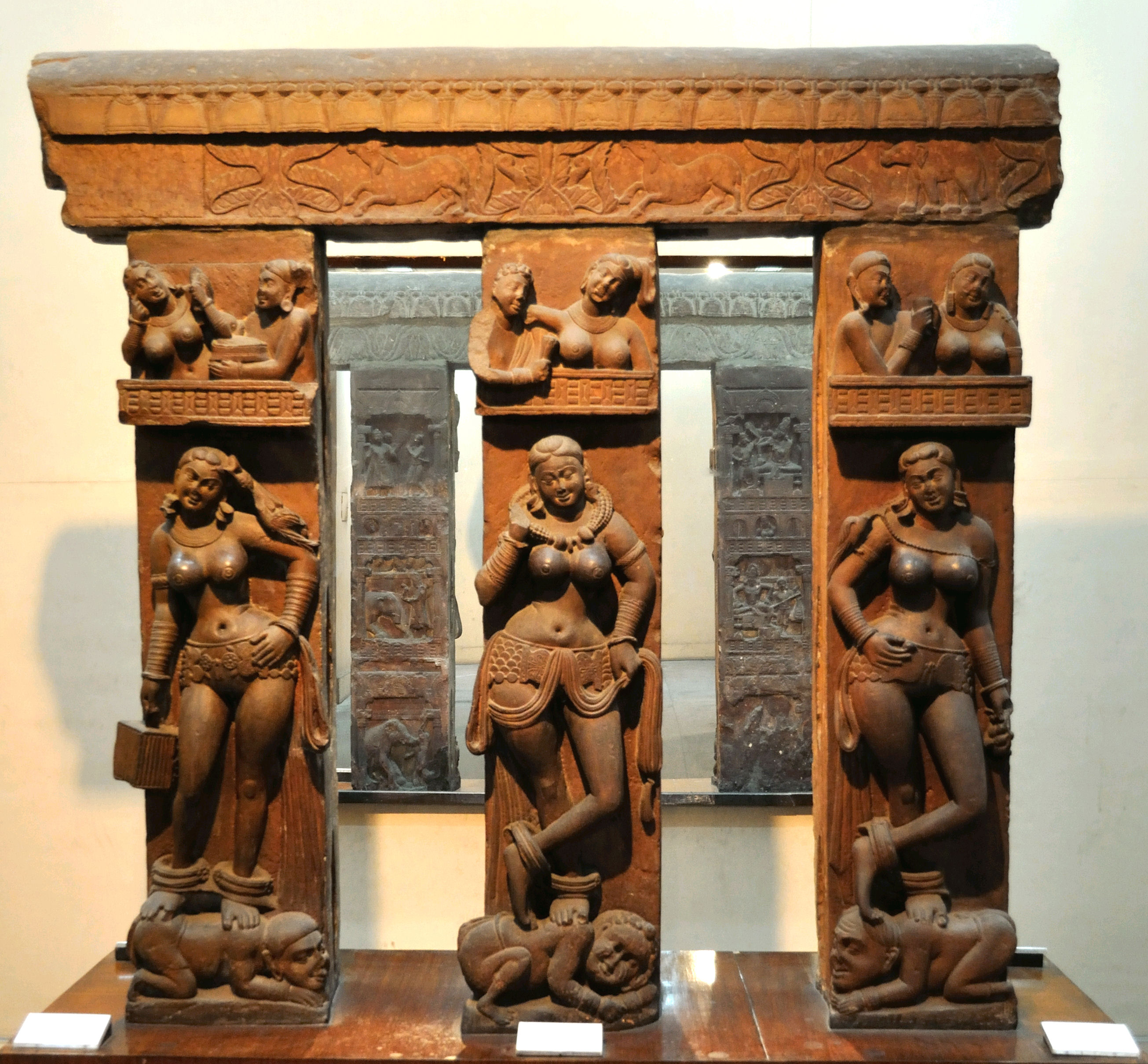
Bhutesvara Yakshis, Mathura ca. 2nd century CE.

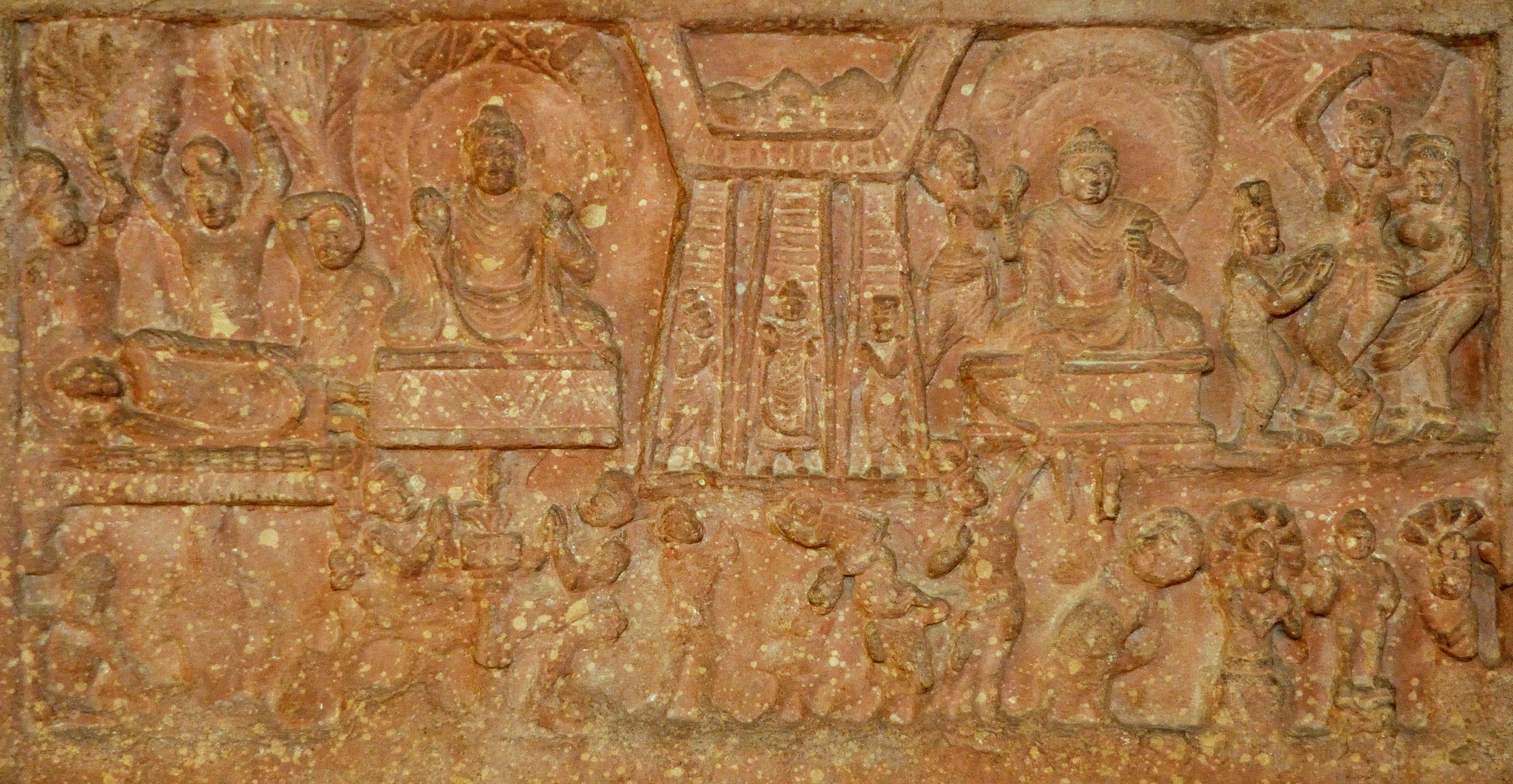
A Mathura relief showing the complete life of the Buddha, from birth to death. The clothing is Gandharan.

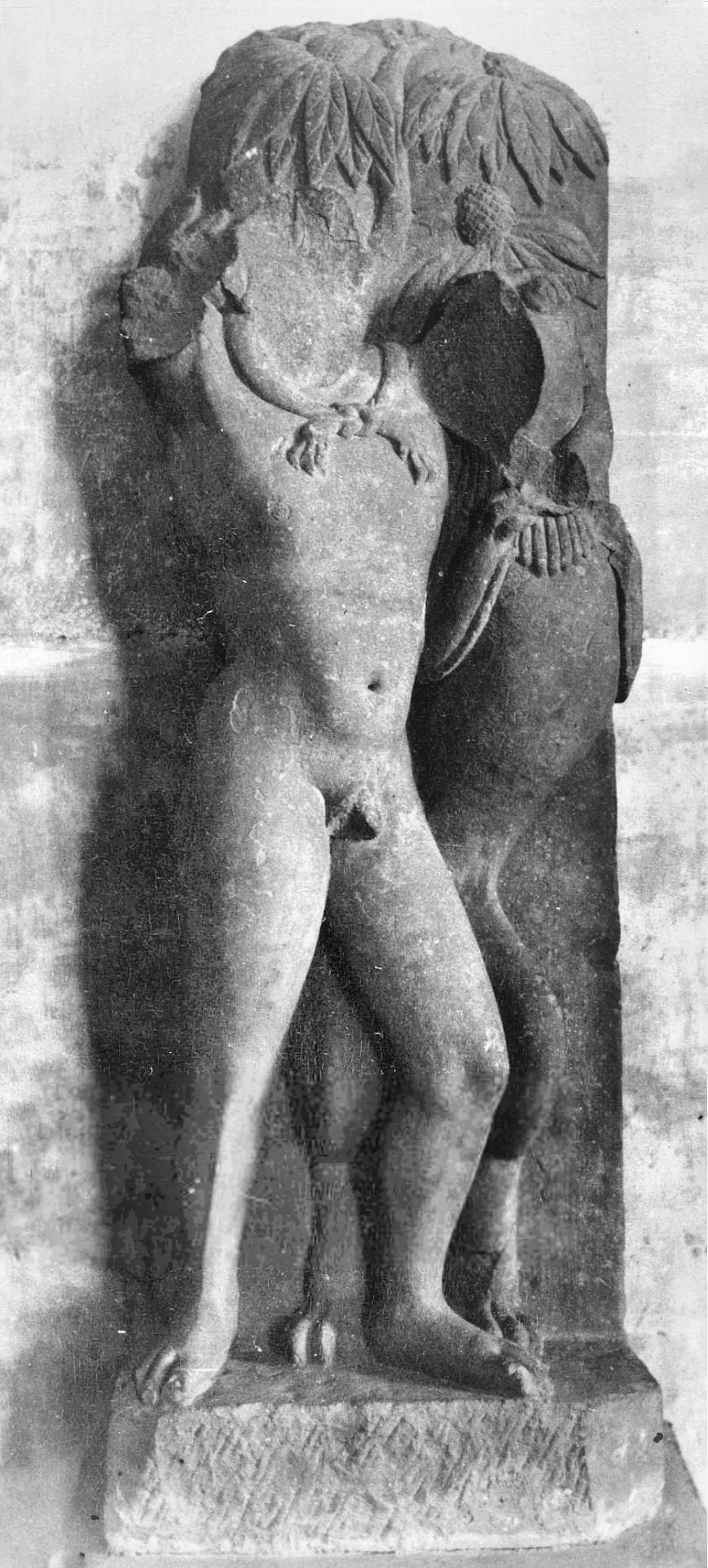
The Mathura Herakles. A statue of Herakles strangling the Nemean lion discovered in Mathura. For a recent photograph see. Early 2nd century CE.

=== Hindu art at Mathura under the Kushans ===
Chatur-vyūha
"The four emanations"

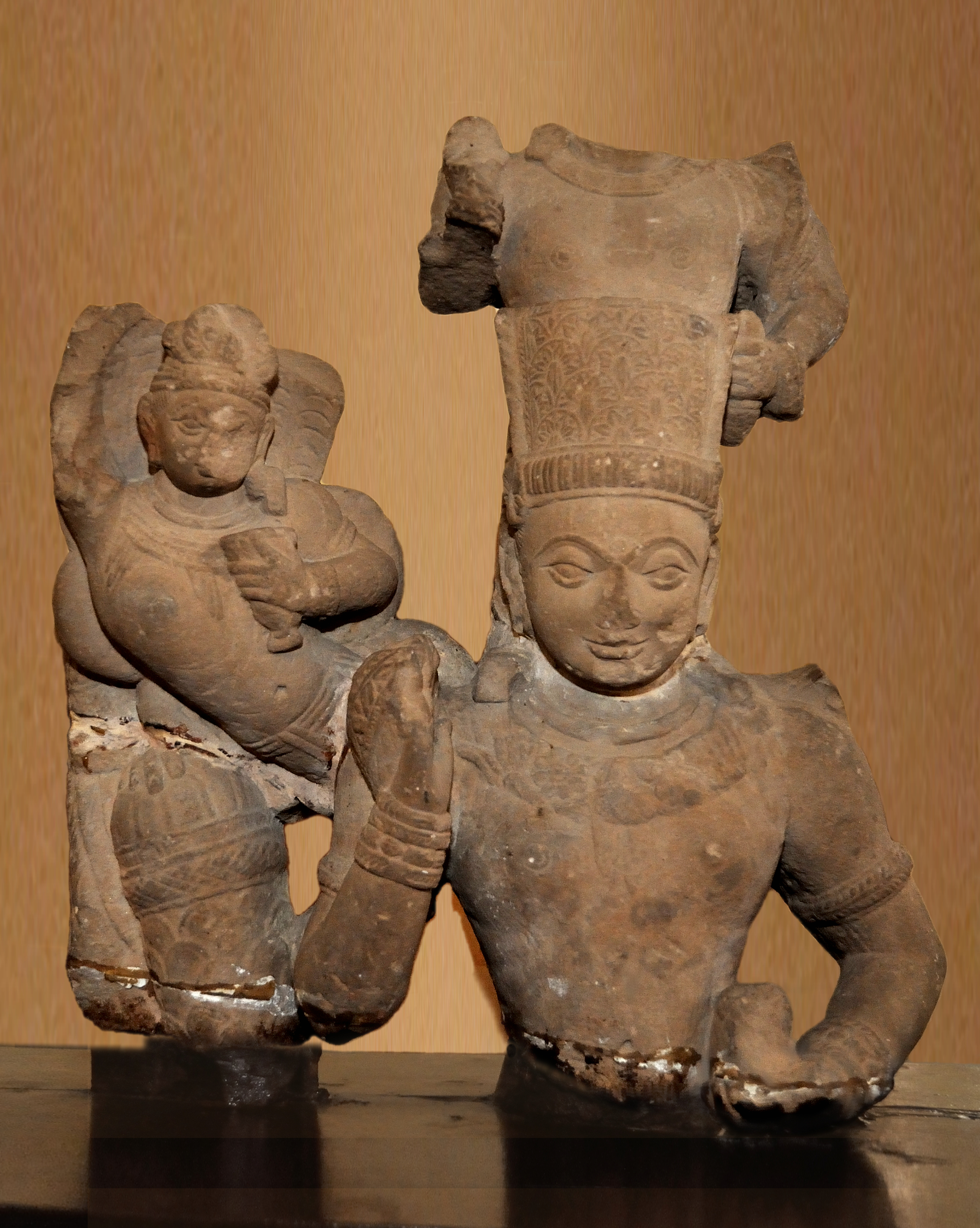
Front

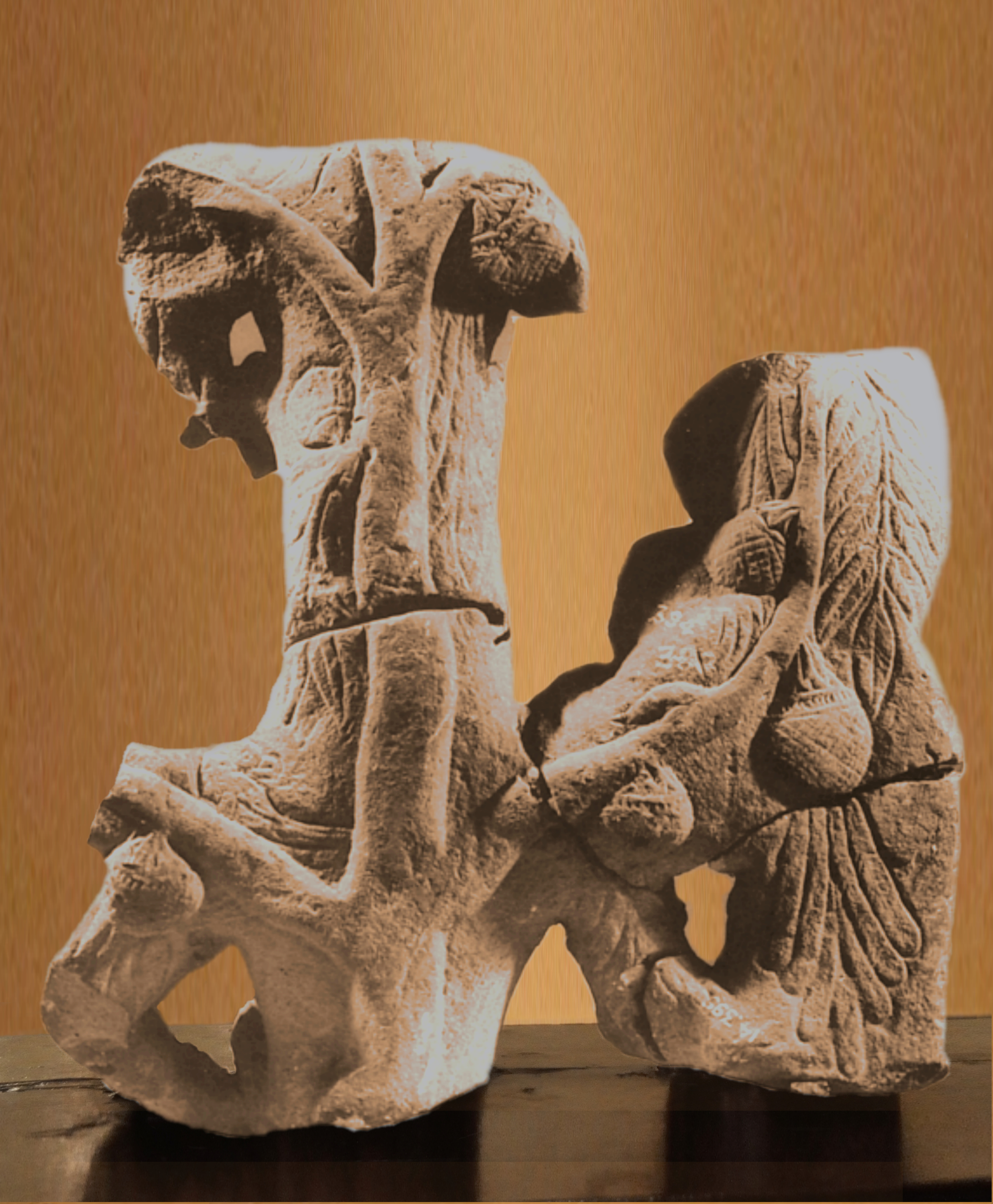
Back

The Chatur-vyūha: Vāsudeva and other members of the Vrishni clan. Vāsudeva is fittingly in the center with his heavy decorated mace on the side and holding a conch, his elder brother Balarama to his right under a serpent hood, his son Pradyumna to his left (lost), and his grandson Aniruddha on top. The back of the statue shows the trunk of a tree with branches, thus highlighting the genealogical relationship between the divinities. 2nd century CE, Mathura Museum.

Hindu art started to develop fully from the 1st to the 2nd century CE, and there are only very few examples of artistic representation before that time. Almost all of the first known instances of Hindu art have been discovered in the areas of Mathura and Gandhara. Hindu art found its first inspiration in the Buddhist art of Mathura. The three Vedic gods Indra, Brahma, and Surya were first depicted in Buddhist sculpture from the 2nd-1st century BCE, as attendants in scenes commemorating the life of the Buddha, even when the Buddha himself was not yet shown in human form but only through his symbols, such as the scenes of his Birth, his Descent from the Trāyastriṃśa Heaven, or his retreat in the Indrasala Cave. During the time of the Kushans, Hindu art progressively incorporated a profusion of original Hindu stylistic and symbolic elements, in contrast with the general balance and simplicity of Buddhist art. The differences appear in iconography rather than in style. It is generally considered that it is in Mathura, during the time of the Kushans, that the Brahmanical deities were given their standard form:

"To a great extent it is in the visual rendering of the various gods and goddesses of theistic Brahmanism that the Mathura artist displayed his ingenuity and inventiveness at their best. Along with almost all the major cult icons Visnu, Siva, Surya, Sakti and Ganapati, a number of subsidiary deities of the faith were given tangible form in Indian art here for the first time in an organized manner. In view of this and for the variety and multiplicity of devotional images then made, the history of Mathura during the first three centuries of the Christian era, which coincided with the rule of the Kusanas, can very well be called revolutionary in the development of Brahmanical sculpture"

— Pran Gopal Paul and Debjani Paul, in Brahmanical Imagery in the Kuṣāṇa Art of Mathurā: Tradition and Innovations

==== Cult images of Vāsudeva ====
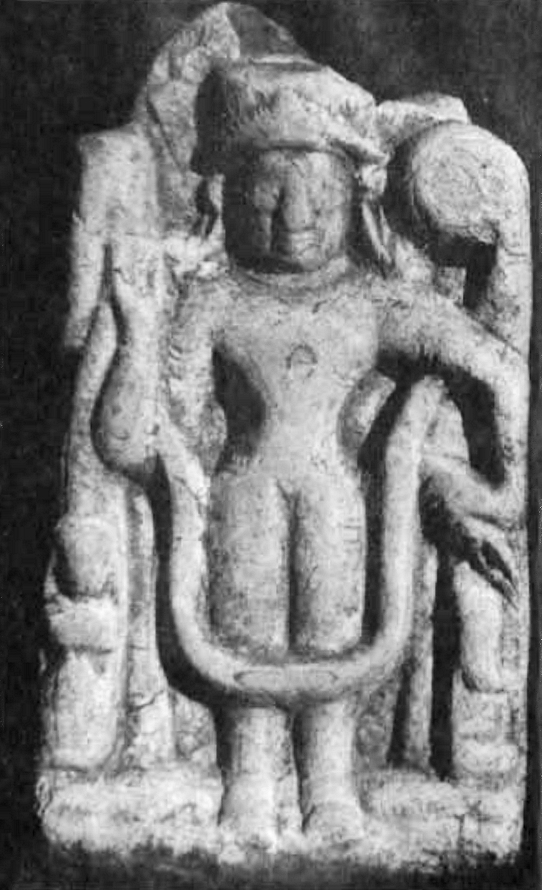
Vasudeva-Krishna with three attributes, a making a salutation gesture, and without an aureole, terracotta.

Cult images of Vāsudeva continued to be produced during the period, the worship of this Mathuran deity being much more important than that of Vishnu until the 4th century CE. Statues dating to the 2nd and 3rd centuries show a possibly four-armed Vāsudeva standing with his attributes: the wheel, the mace, and the conch, his right hand saluting in Abhaya mudra. Only during the Gupta period, did statues focusing on the worship of Vishnu himself start to appear, using the same iconography as the statues of Vāsudeva, but with the addition of an aureole starting at the shoulders. During this time, statues of Gopala-Krishna, the other main component of the amalgamated Krishna, are absent from Mathura, suggesting the near absence of this cult in northern India down to the end of the Gupta period (6th century CE).

Some sculptures during this period suggest that the "Vyūha doctrine" (Vyūhavāda, "Doctrine of the emanations") was starting to emerge, as images of "Chatur-vyūha" (the "four emanations of Vāsudeva") are appearing. The famous "Caturvyūha" statue in Mathura Museum is an attempt to show in one composition Vāsudeva as the central deity together with the other members of the Vrishni clan of the Pancharatra system emanating from him: Samkarsana, Pradyumna, and Aniruddha, with Samba missing. The back of the relief is carved with the branches of a Kadamba tree, symbolically showing the genealogical relationship being the different deities. The depiction of Vāsudeva and later Vishnu was stylistically derived from the type of the ornate Bodhisattvas, with rich jewelry and ornate headdress.

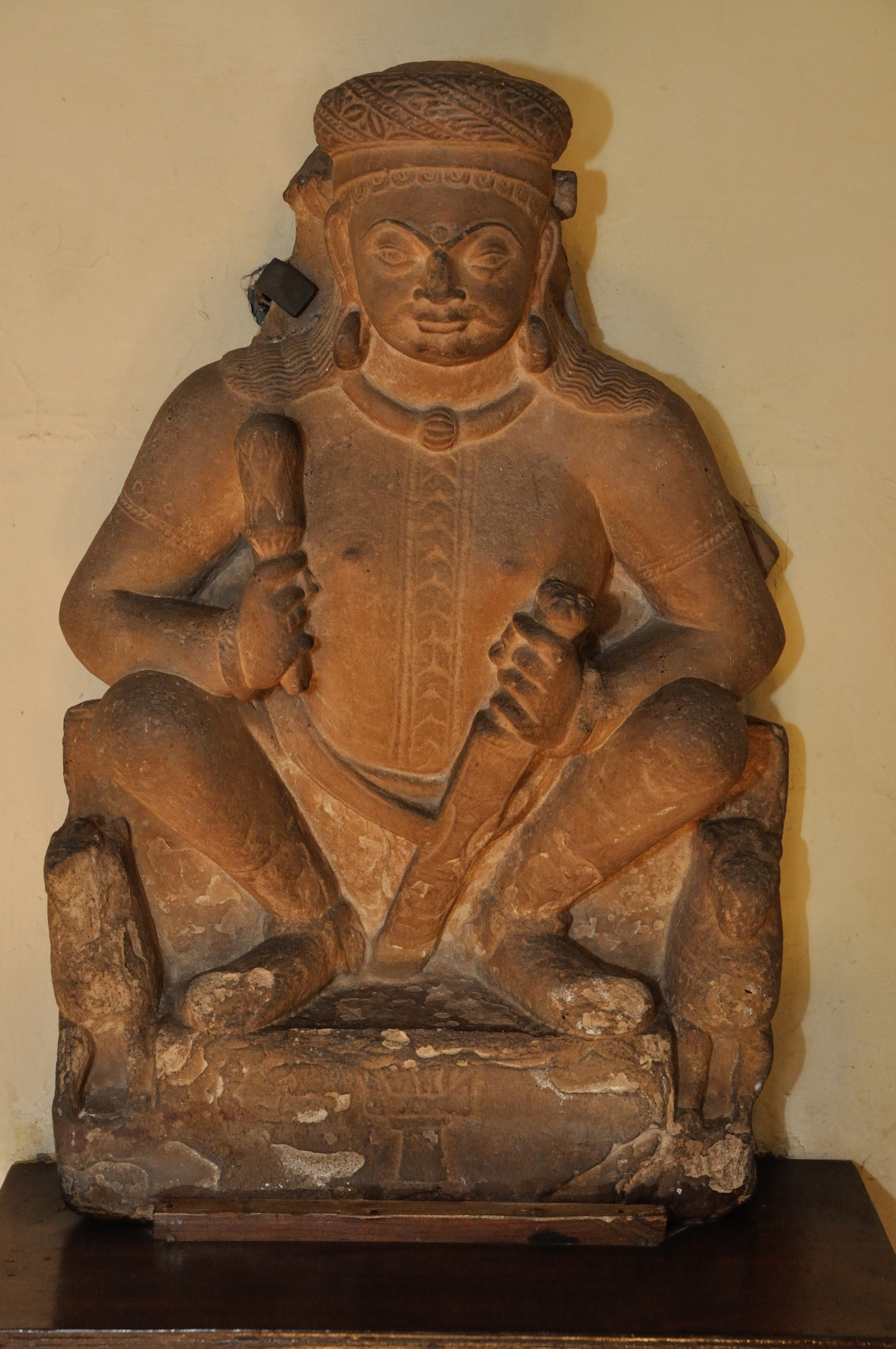
Sun God Surya, also revered in Buddhism, Kushan Period

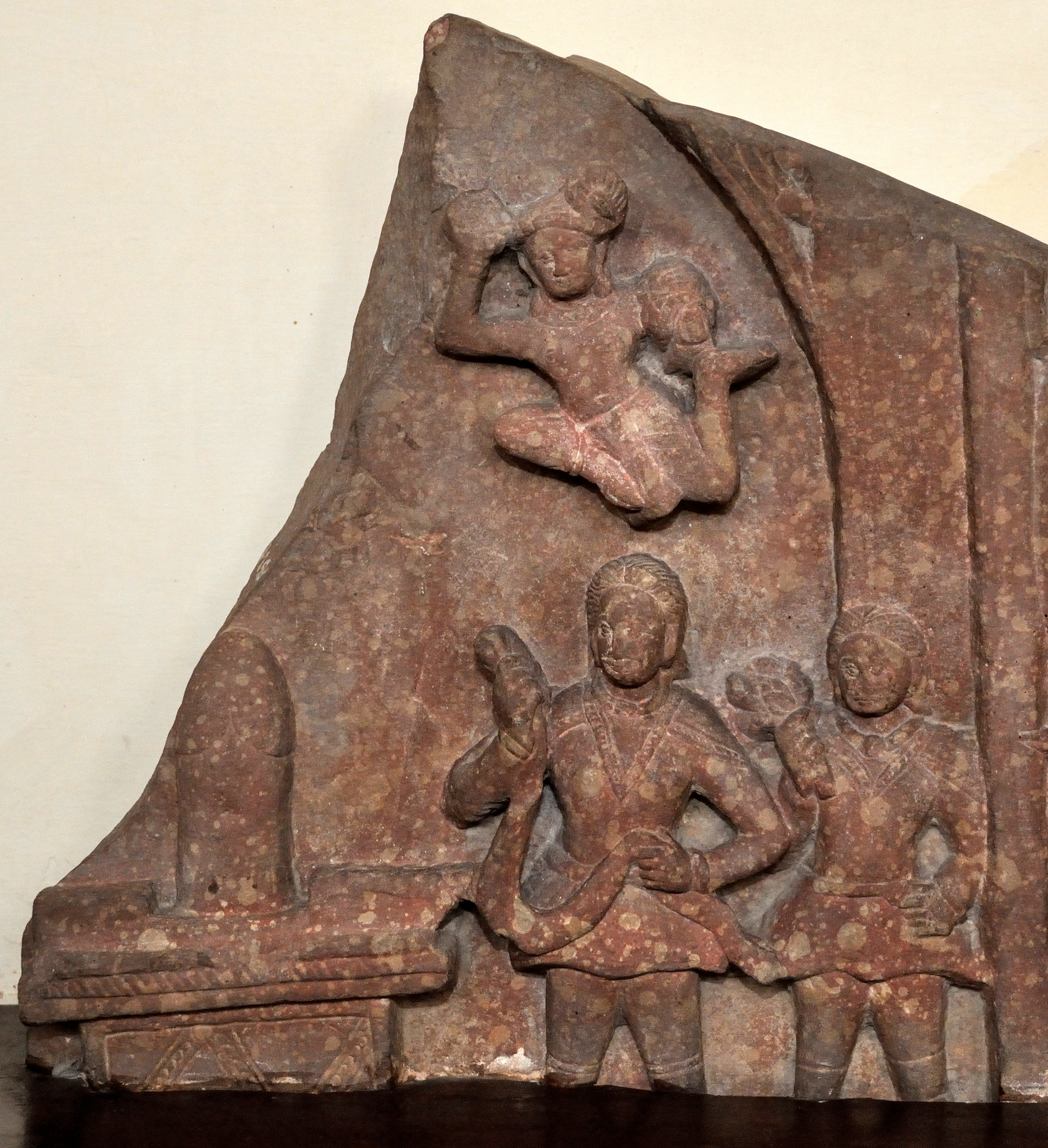
Shiva Linga worshipped by Indo-Scythian, or Kushan devotees, 2nd century CE.

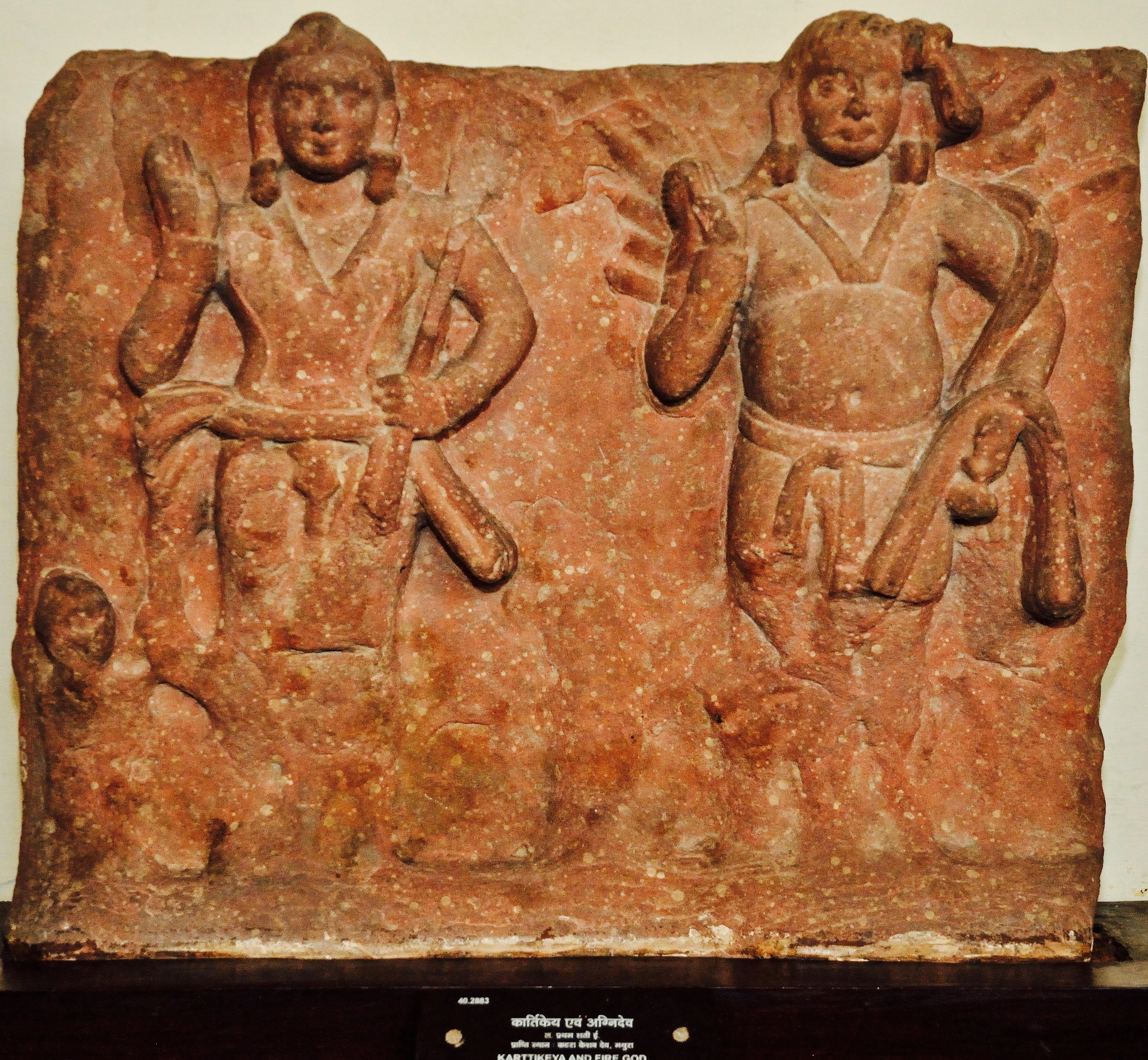
War God Karttikeya and Fire God Agni, Kushan Period, 1st century CE

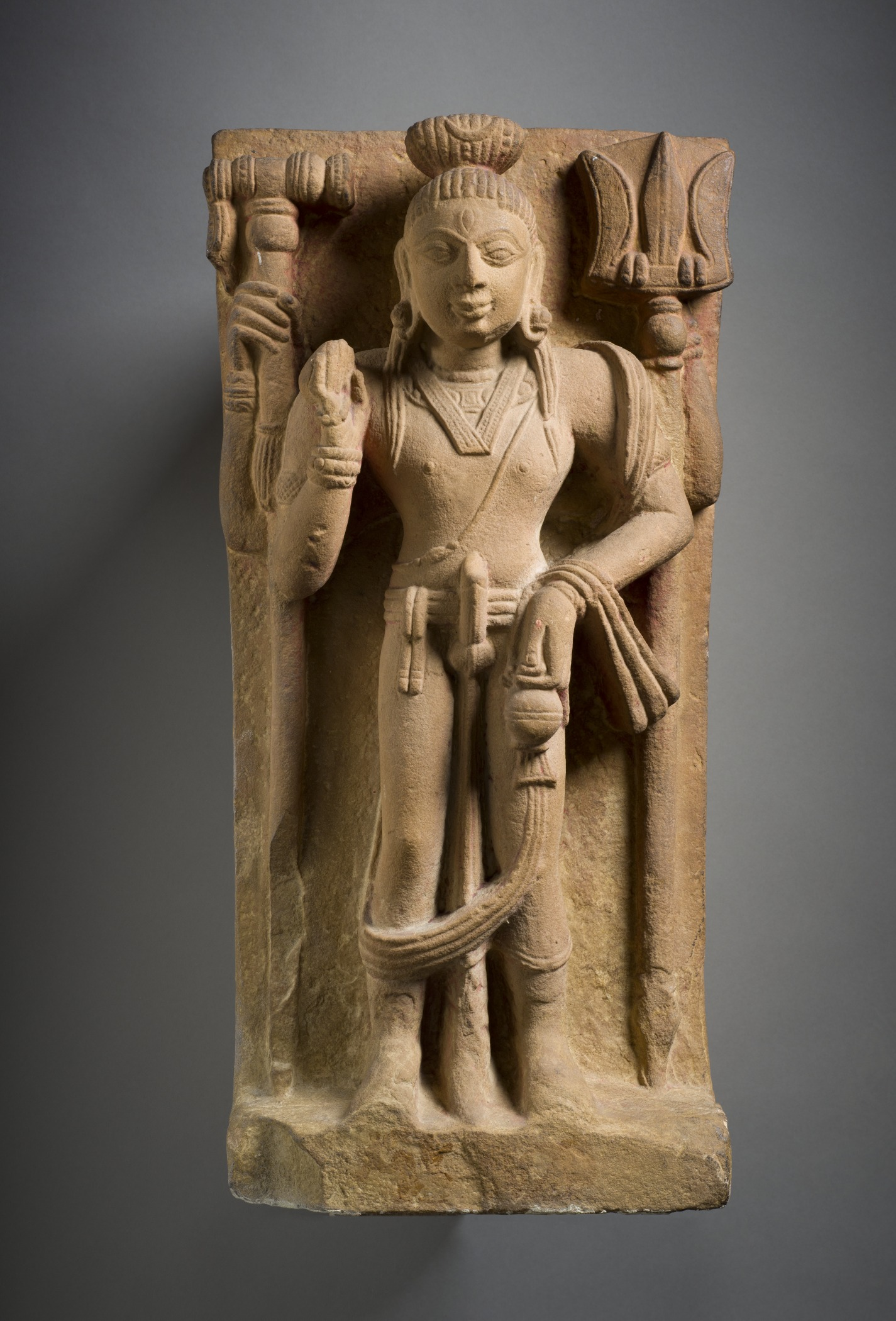
The Hindu God Shiva, 3rd century CE. Mathura or Ahichchhatra.

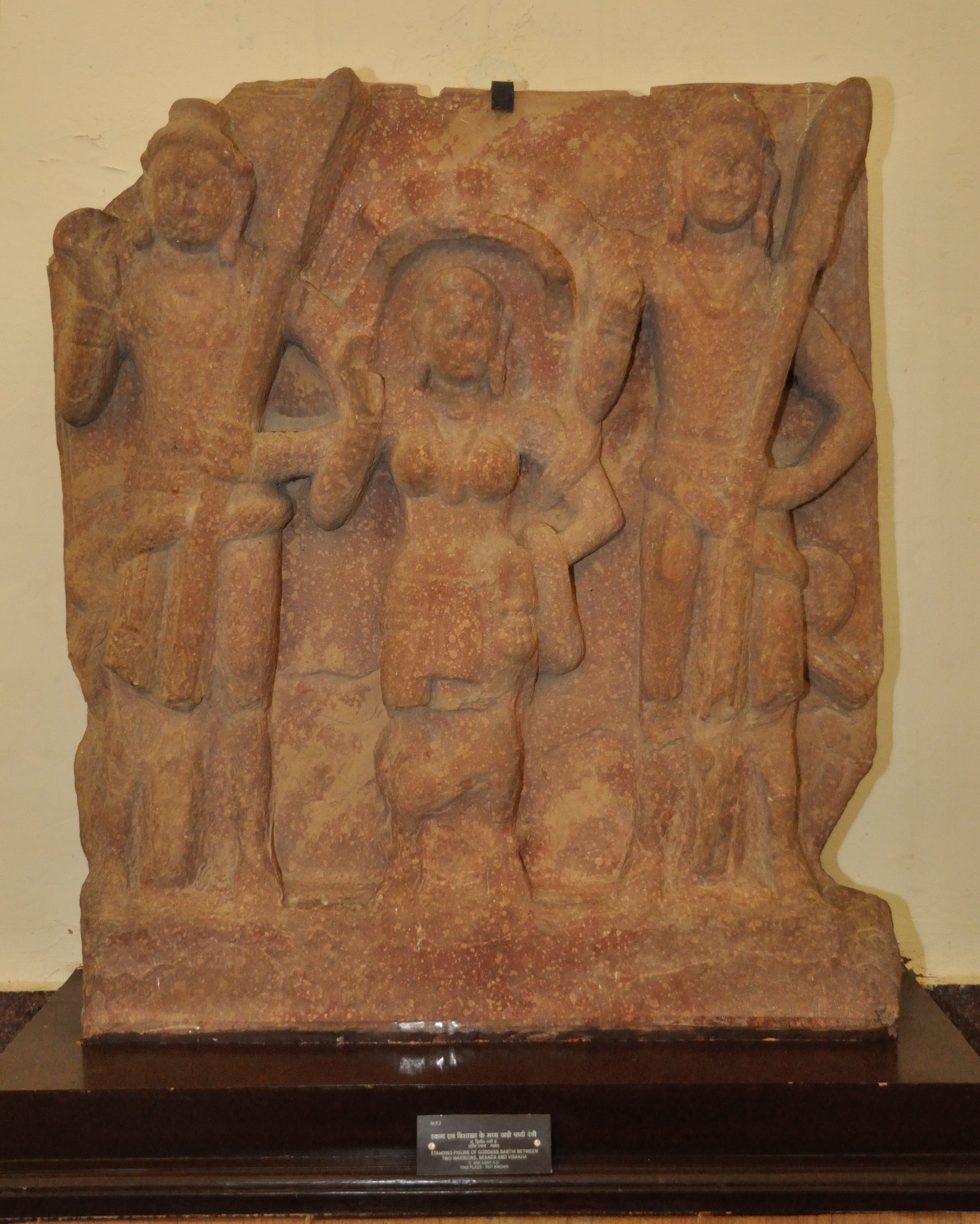
Kushan-era image of Shashthi between Skanda and Vishakha, c. 2nd century CE

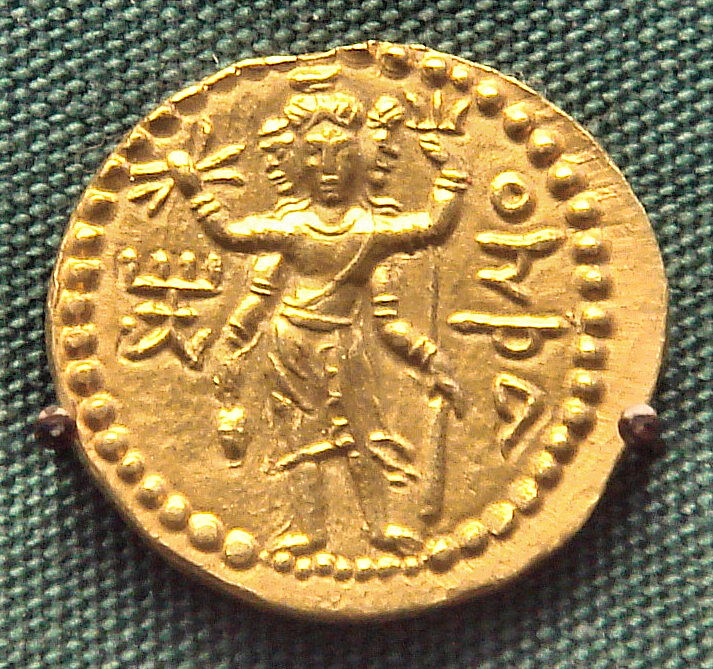
Three-faced four-armed Oesho with attributes, often identified with Shiva, on a coin of Huvishka.

=== Jain art ===
Various dedications in the name of Kushan kings, such as Vasudeva I, with dates, appear on fragments of Jain statuary discovered in Mathura.

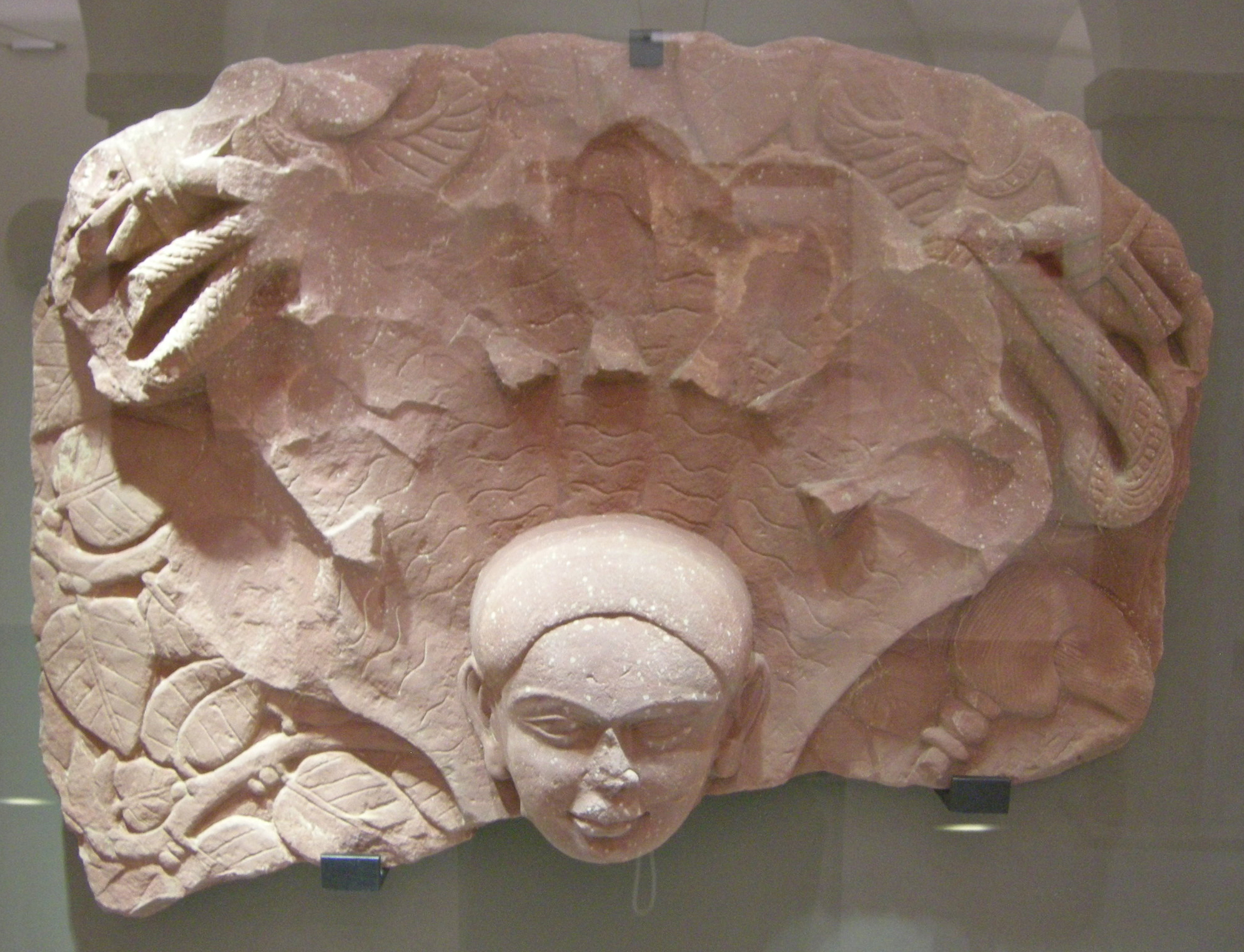
Parshvanatha, Kushan Period

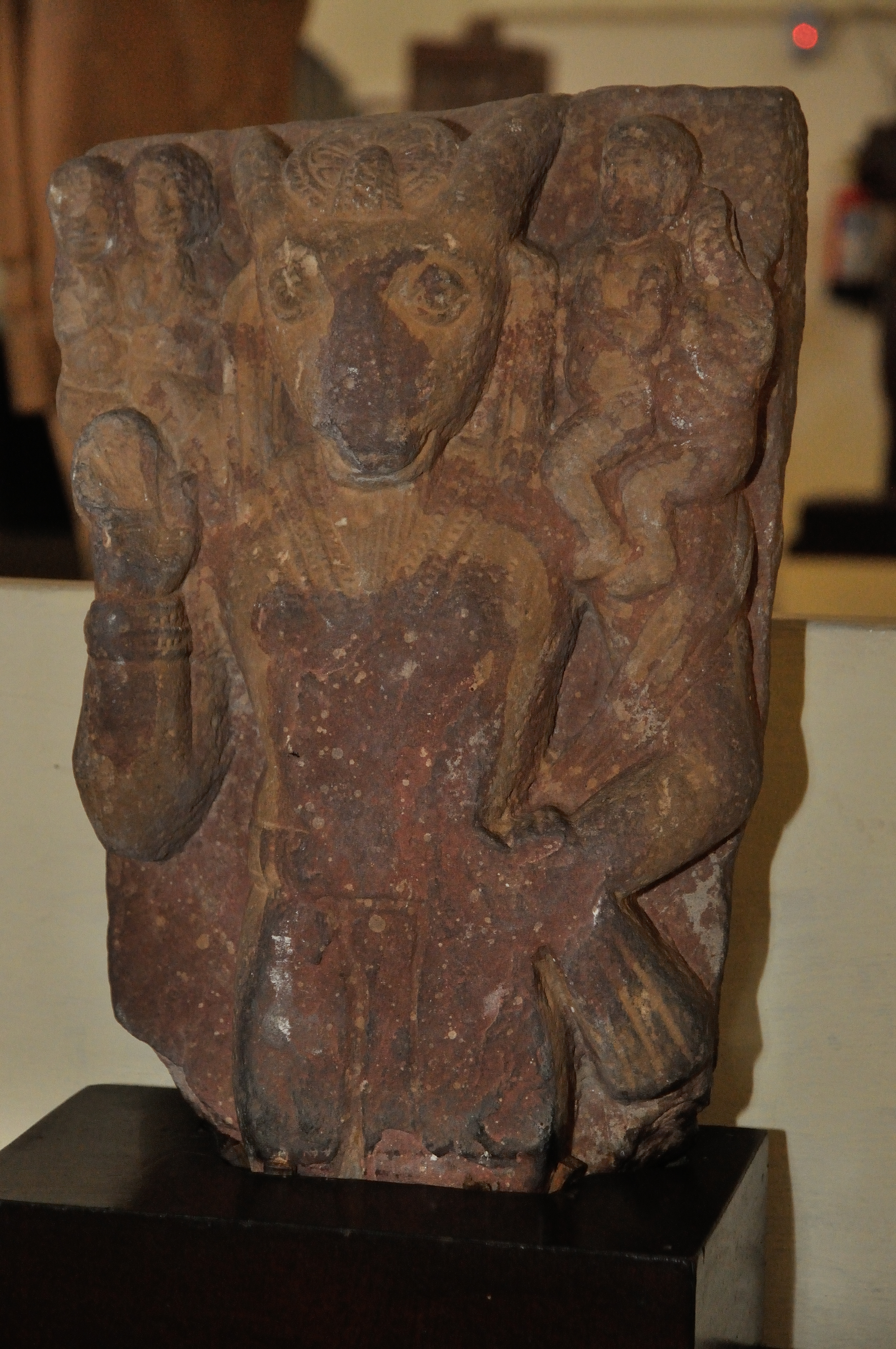
Goat-faced God Harinaigamesha, Kushan Period, Mathura

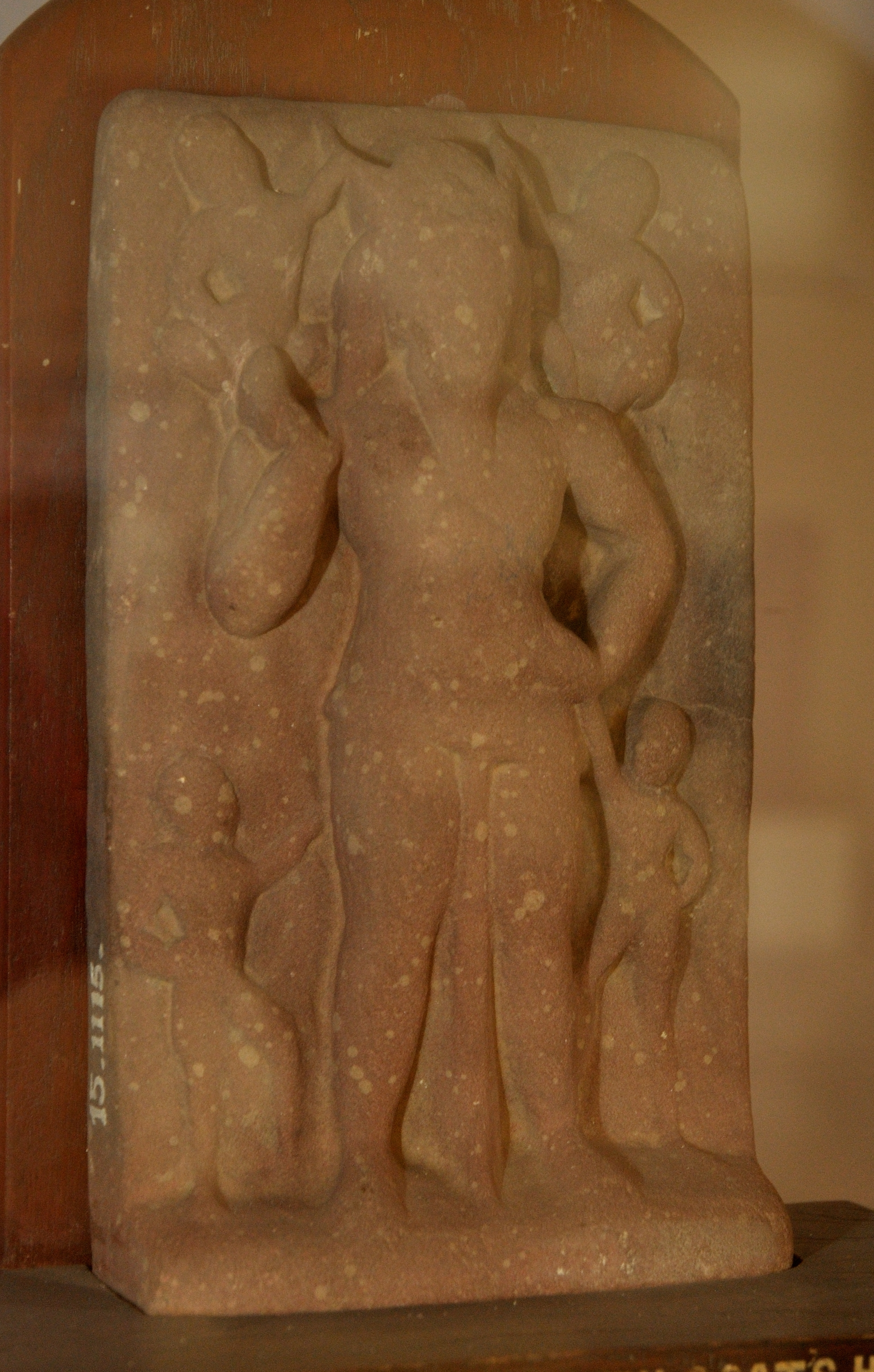
Jain god of Childbirth Naigamesha, 1st-3rd century CE.

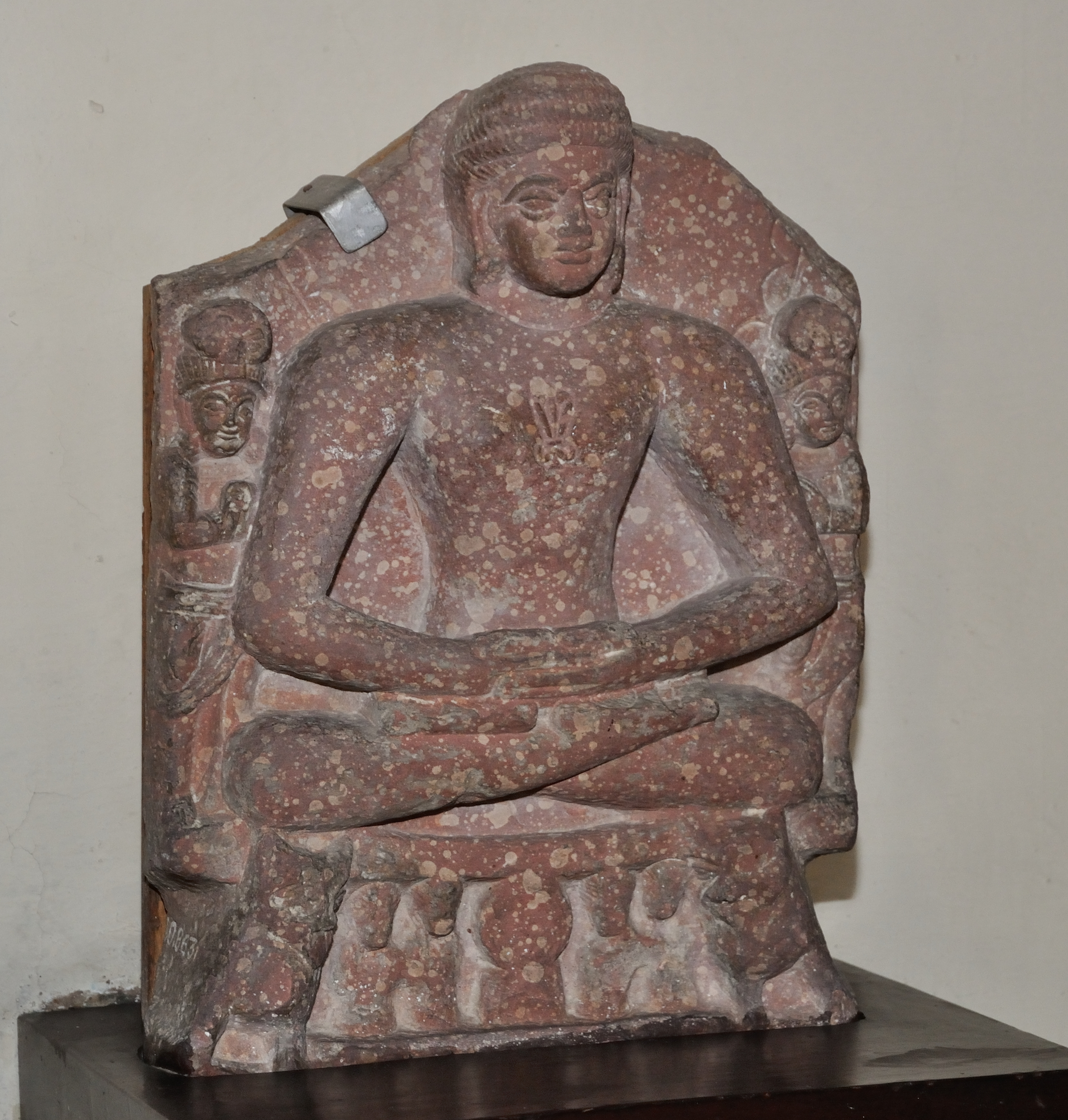
Jina in Meditation, Kushan Period, Mathura

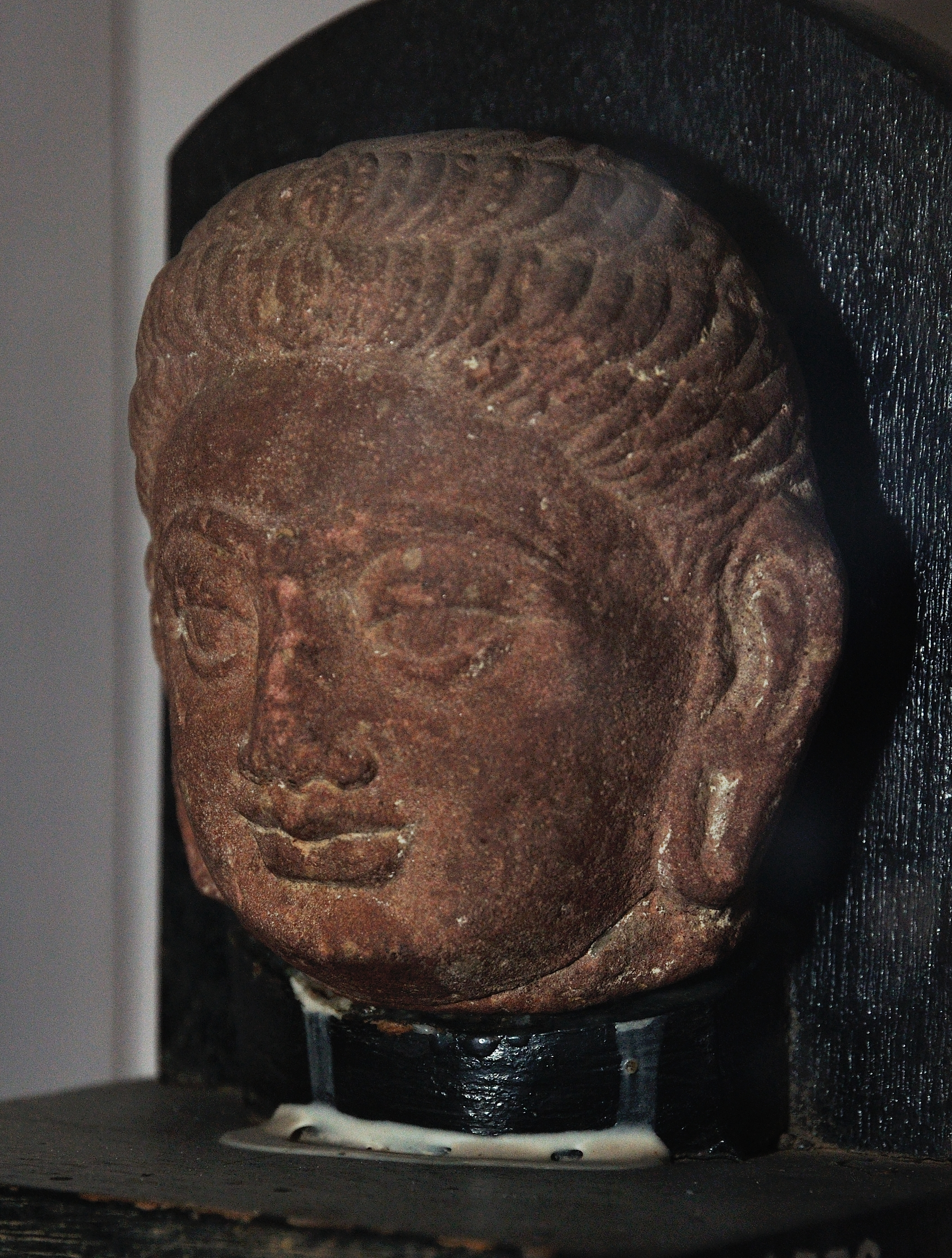
Tirthankara Head, Kushan Period, Mathura

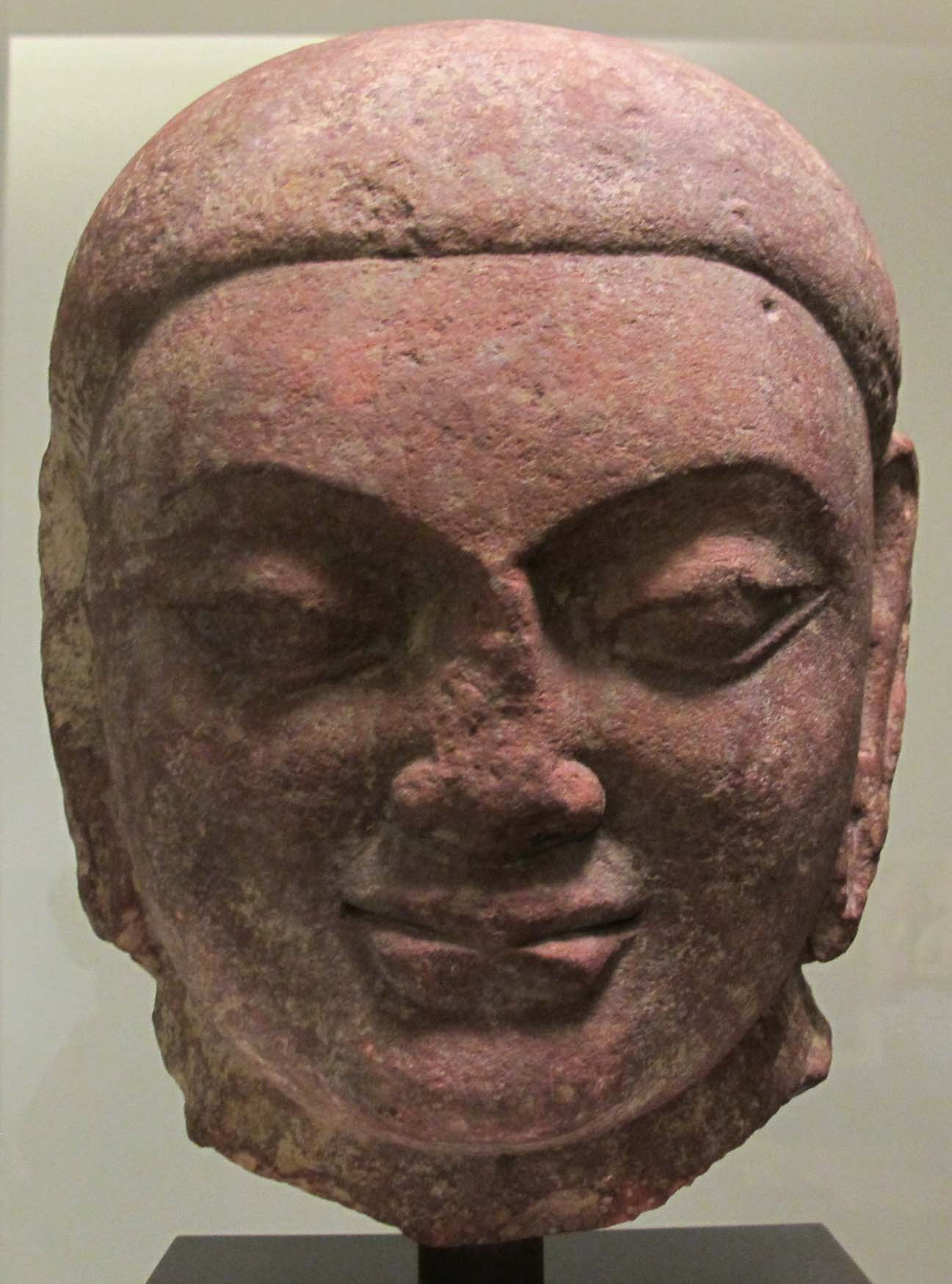
Tirthankara Head, Kushan Period, Mathura

== Chronology ==
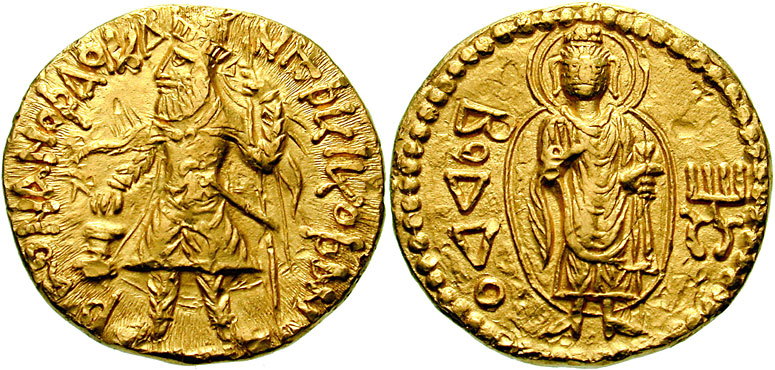
Gold coin of Kanishka I with a representation of the Buddha and Bactrian legend in Greek script: ΒΟΔΔΟ "Boddo", for "Buddha", c. 127–150 CE.

The chronology of Kushan art is quite critical to the art history of the region. Fortunately, several statues are dated and have inscriptions referring to the various rulers of the Kushan Empire.

Coinage is also very important in determining the evolution of style, as in the case of the famous "Buddha" coins of Kanishka I, which are dated to his reign (c. 127–150 CE) and already displays an accomplished form of the standing Buddha, probably derived from pre-existing statuary.

While the early styles of Kushan statues seem comparatively crude, later, highly ornamented statues are generally dated to the 3rd-4th century CE.

The Brussels Buddha is one of the rare Gandharan statues with a dated inscription, and it bears the date "Year 5", possibly referring to the Kanishka era, hence 132 CE. However, its sophisticated style has led some authors to suggest a later era for the calculation of the date.

Dated art under the Kushans
(30–375 CE)
Gandhara region
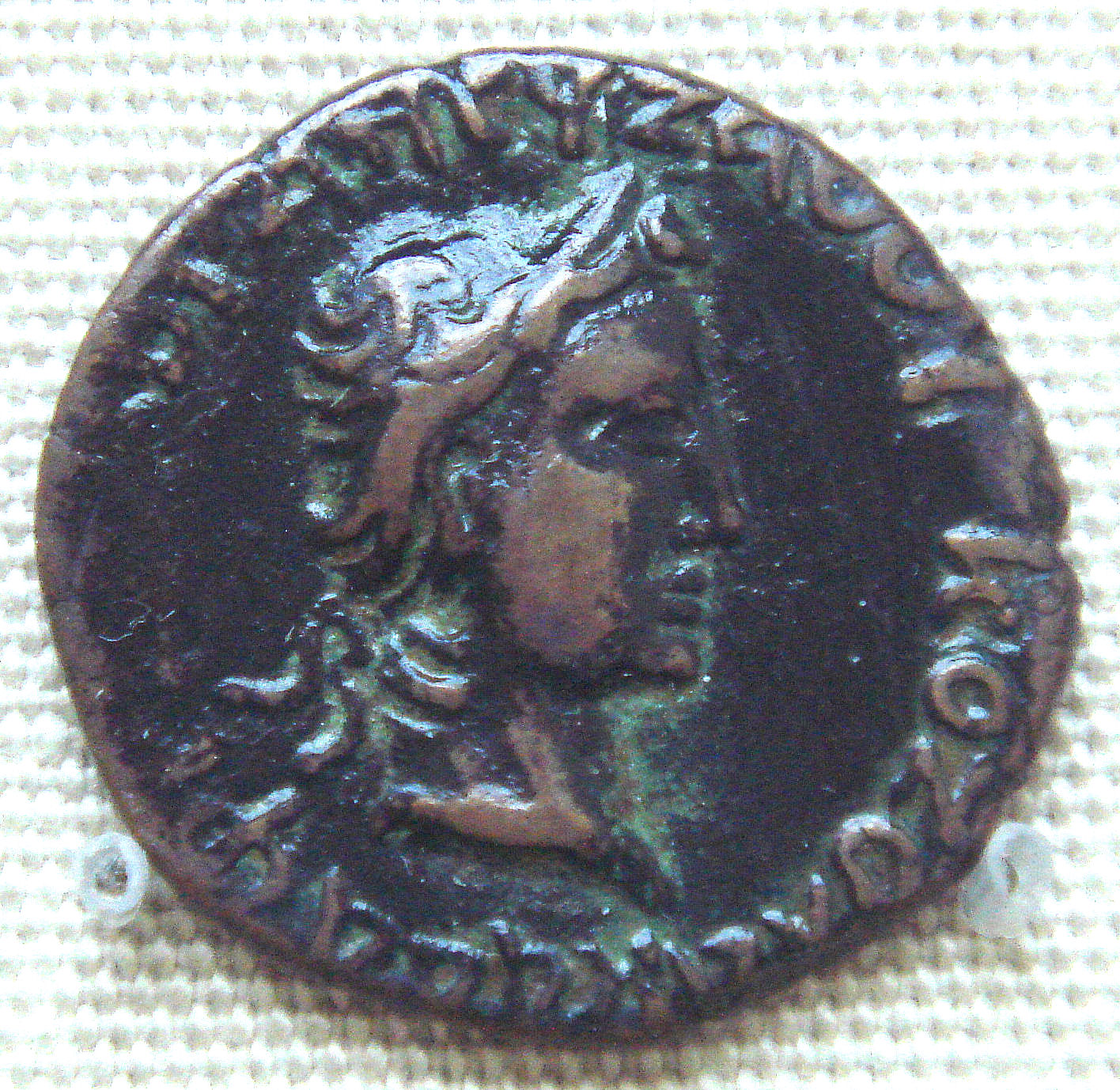
40-80 CE
Coin of Kujula Kadphises, on the model of Roman Emperor Augustus

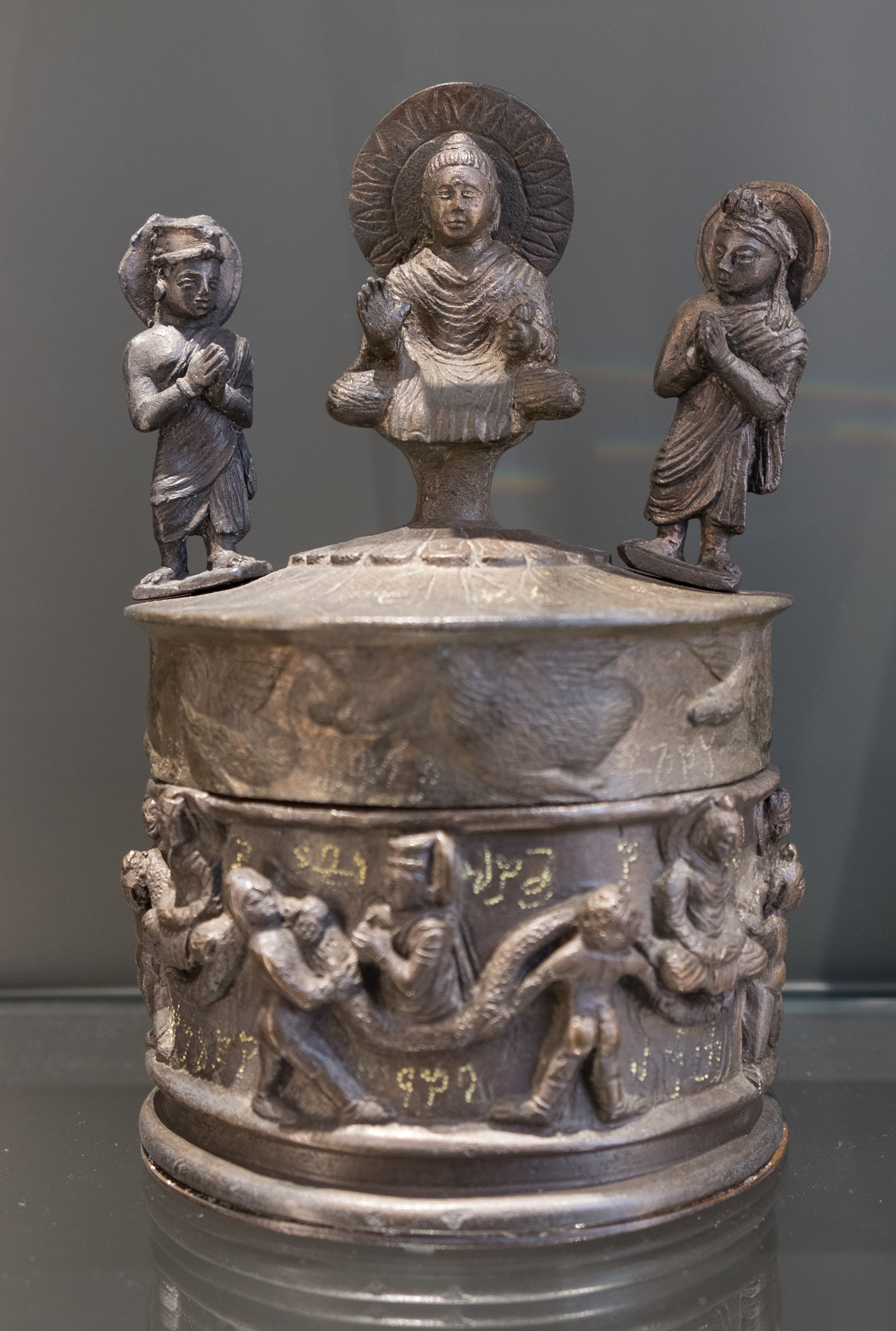
127 CE
Kanishka casket, inscribed "year 1 of Kanishka" (127 CE)

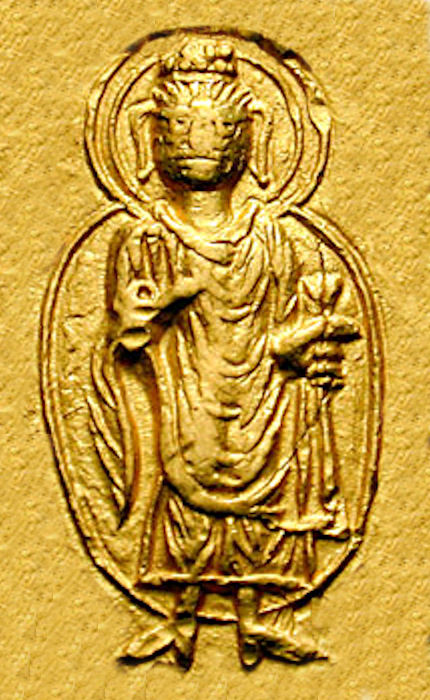
127-150 CE
The Buddha in Gandhara style on a coin of Kanishka I

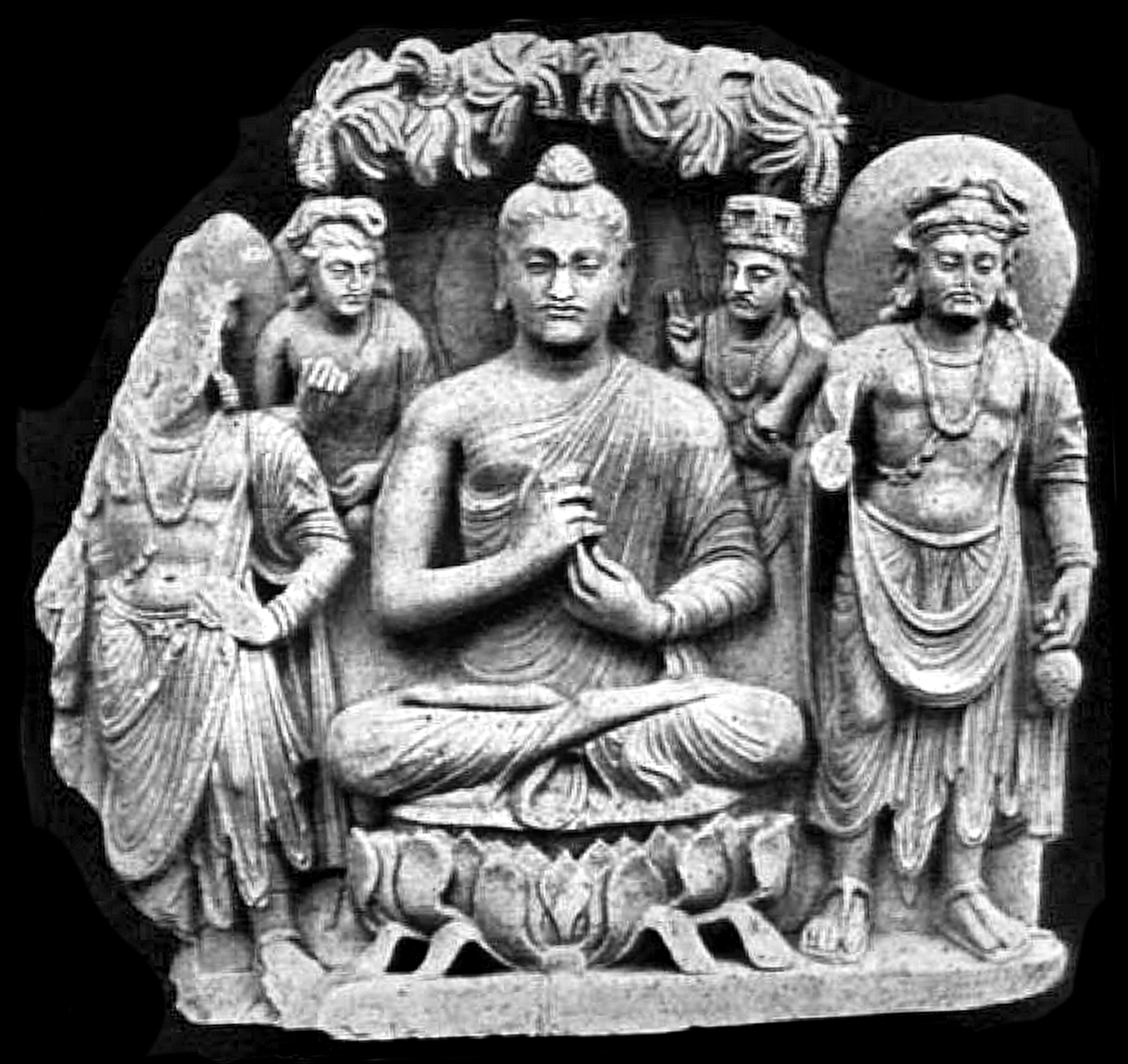
132 CE
Gandhara Buddhist Triad from Sahr-i-Bahlol, similar to the dated Brussels Buddha, "Year 5", circa 132 CE. Peshawar Museum.

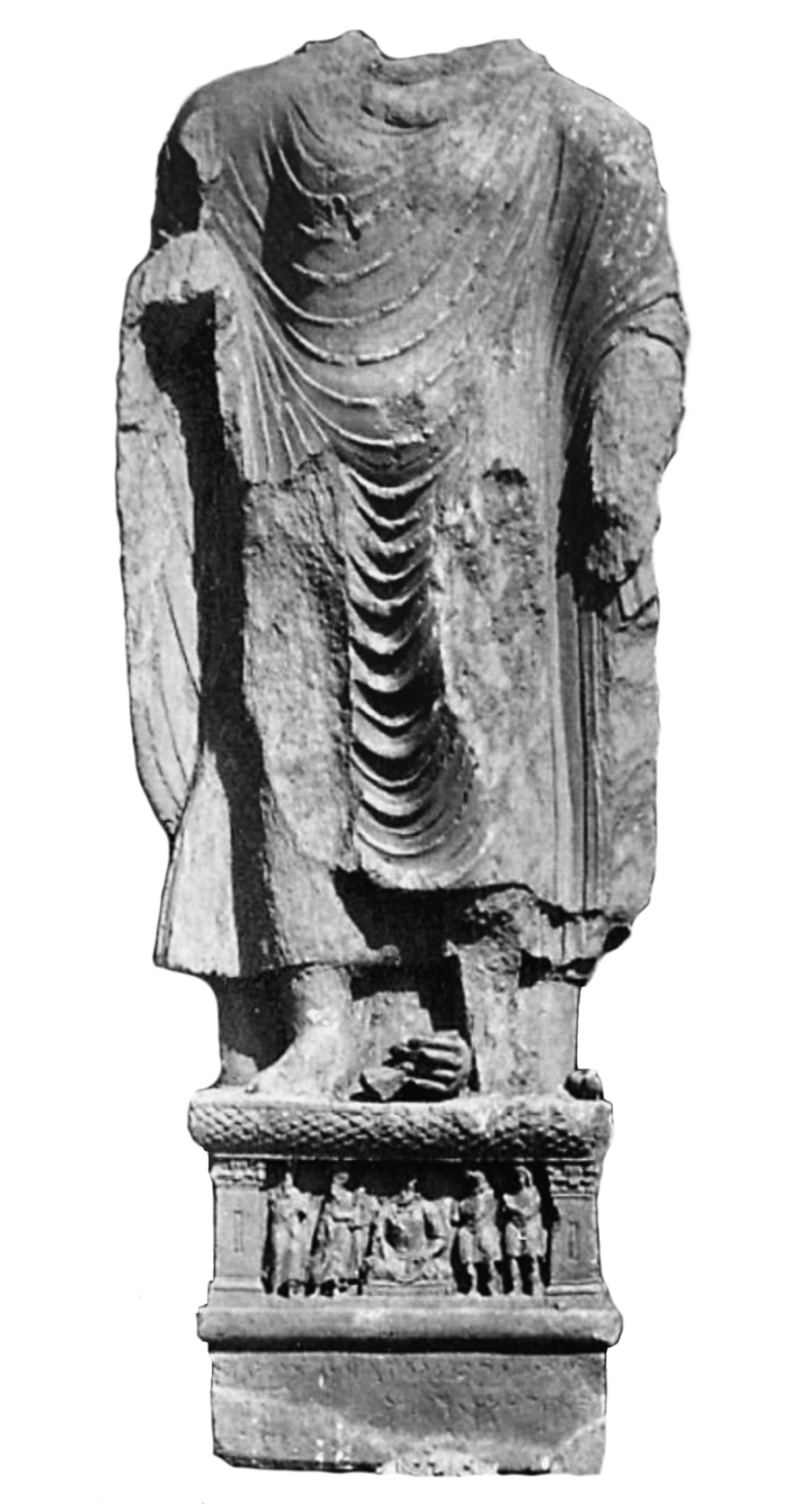
143 CE
Kanishka I:
Buddha from Loriyan Tangai with inscription "year 318" of the Yavana era (143 CE).

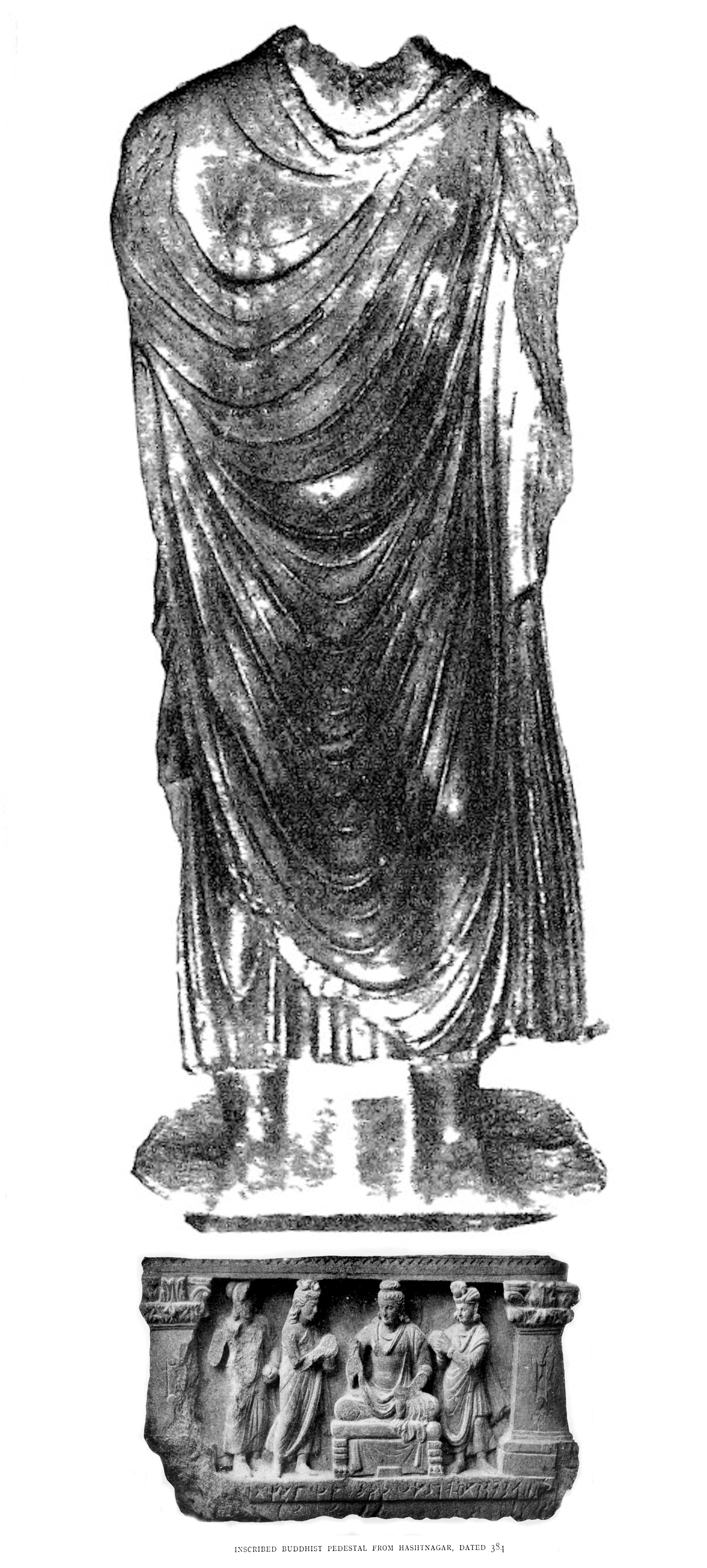
209 CE
Vasudeva I:
Hashtnagar Buddha with "year 384" of the Yavana era (c.209 CE).

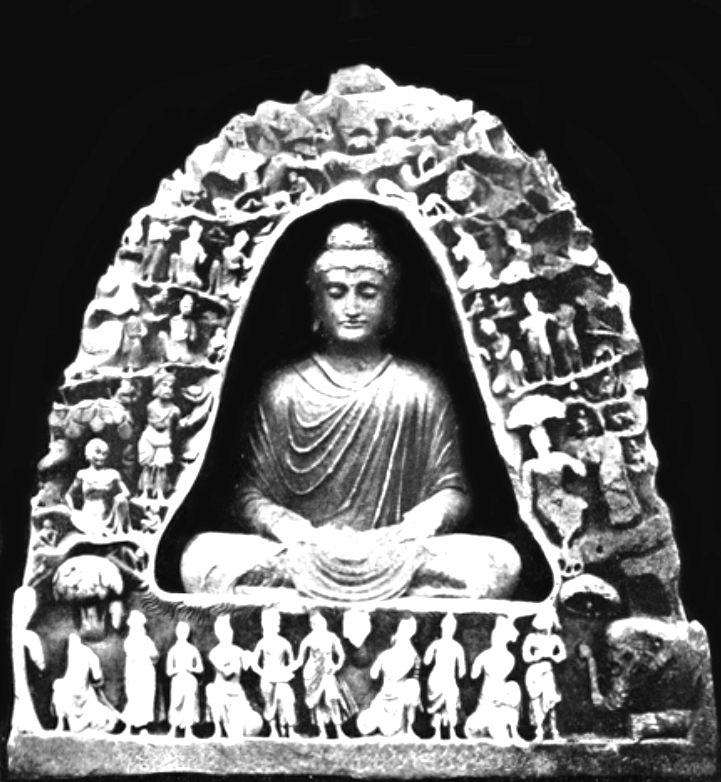
216CE
Vasudeva I:
Mamane Dheri Buddha, inscribed with "Year 89", probably of the Kanishka era (216 CE).

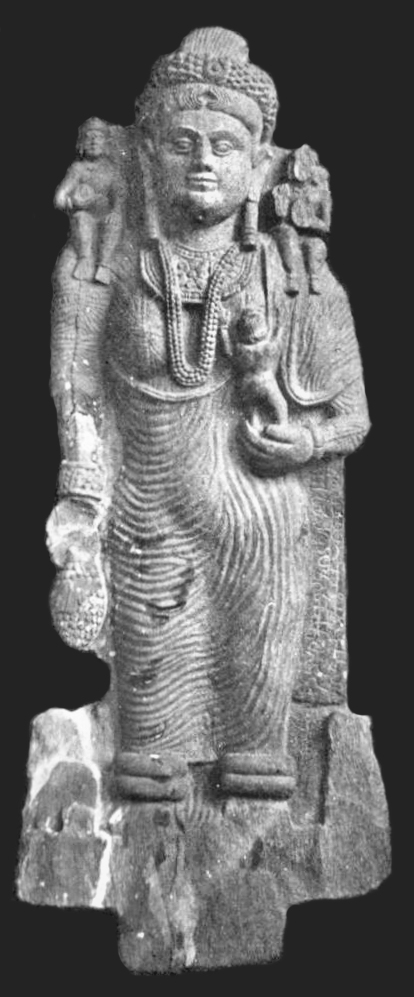
244 CE
Kanishka II:
Statue of Hariti from Gandhara, "Year 399" of the Yavana era (244 CE).

Mathura region
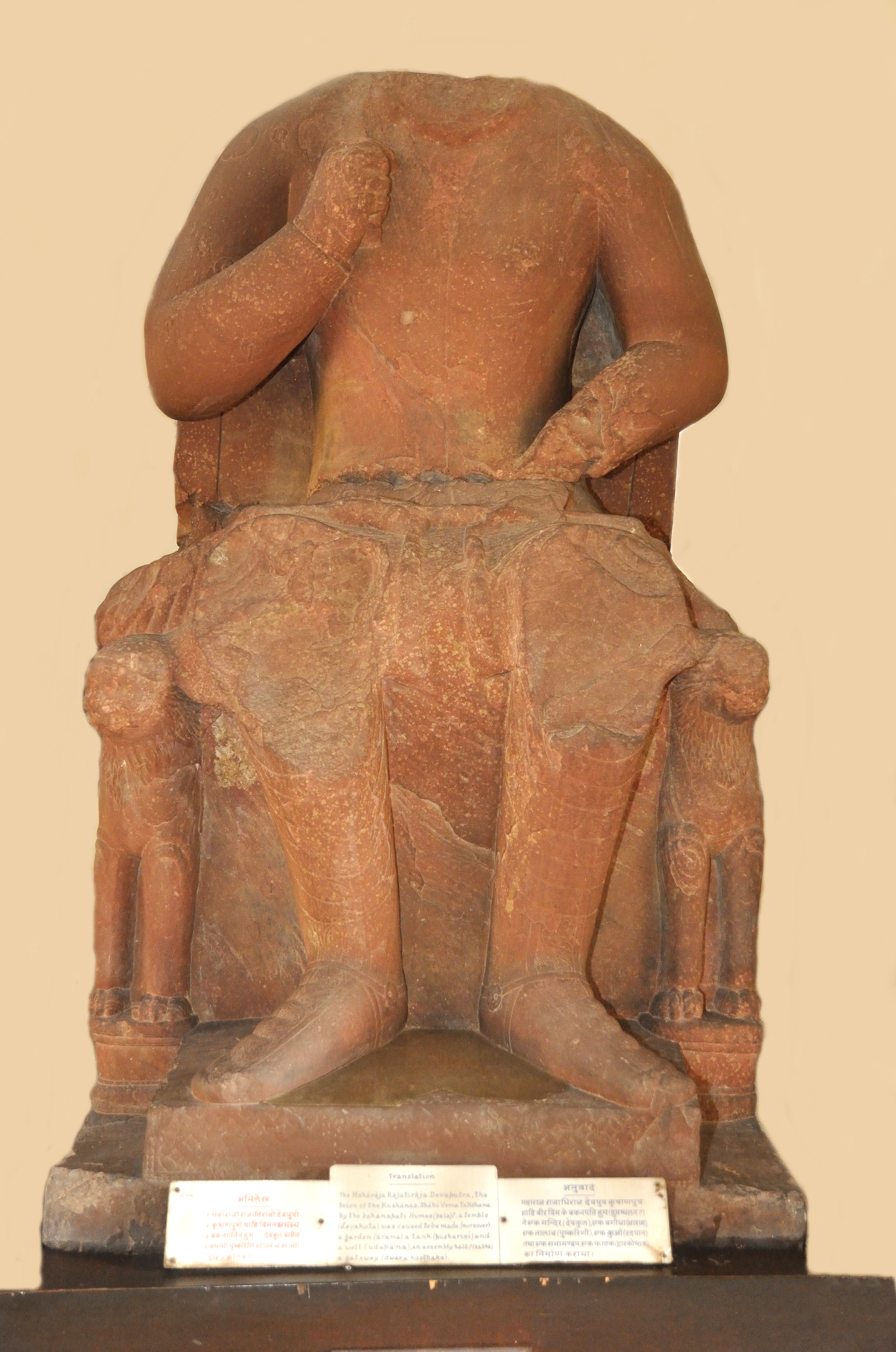
90-100 CE
Dynastic statue of Vima Kadphises, with inscription. Mathura

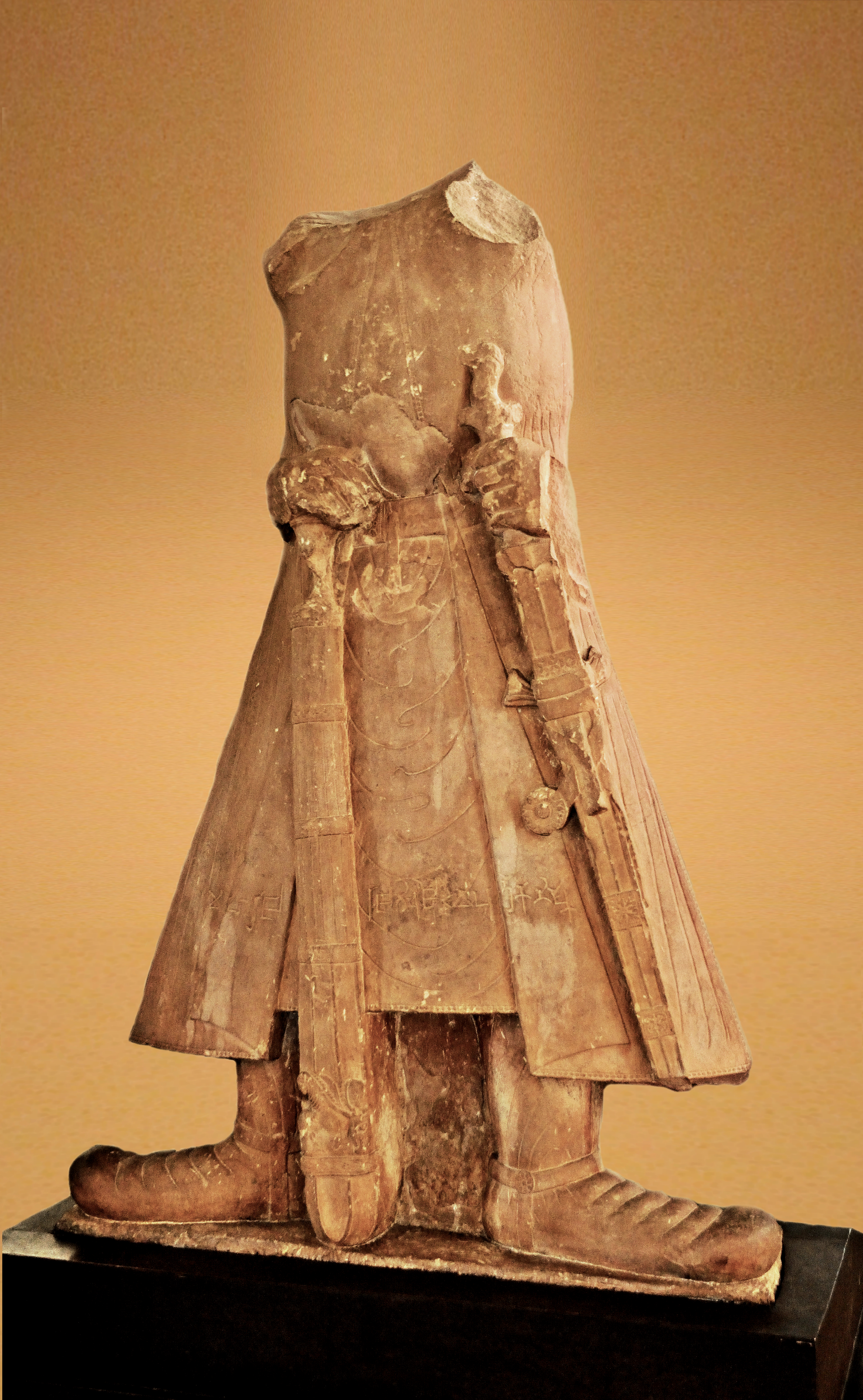
127-150 CE
Kanishka I:
Dynastic statue of Kanishka with inscription (127-151 CE)

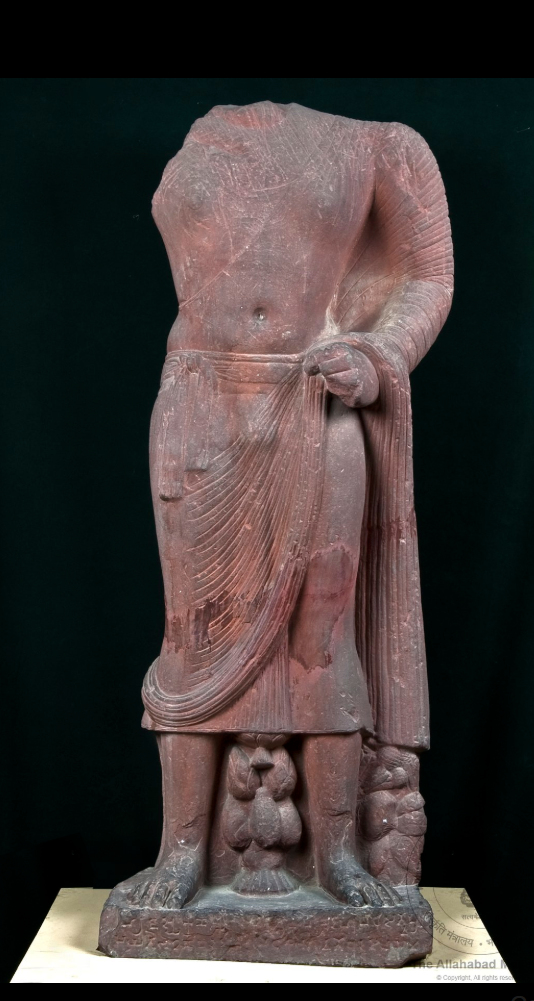
129 CE
Kanishka I:
Kosambi Bodhisattva, inscribed "Year 2 of Kanishka" (129 CE).

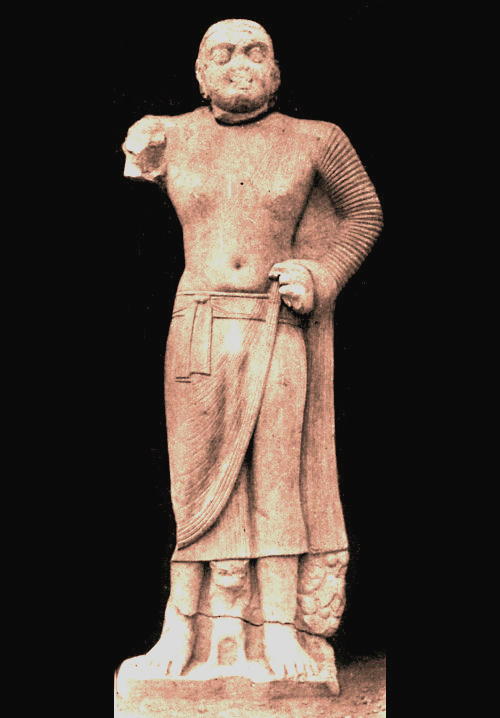
130 CE
Kanishka I:
Bala Bodhisattva, Sarnath, inscribed "Year 3 of Kanishka" (130 CE).

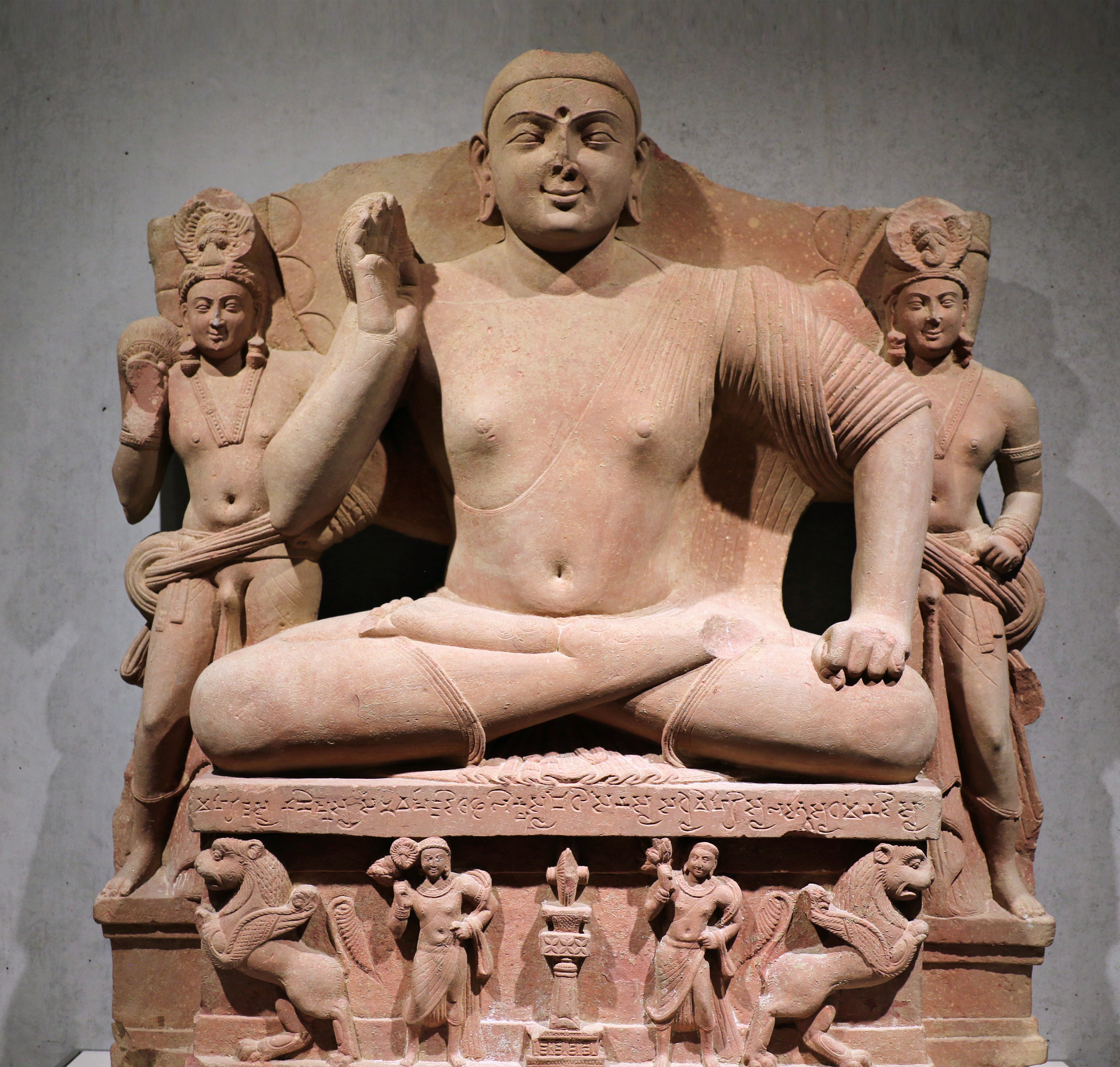
131 CE
Kanishka I:
"Kimbell seated Buddha", with inscription "year 4 of Kanishka" (131 CE).

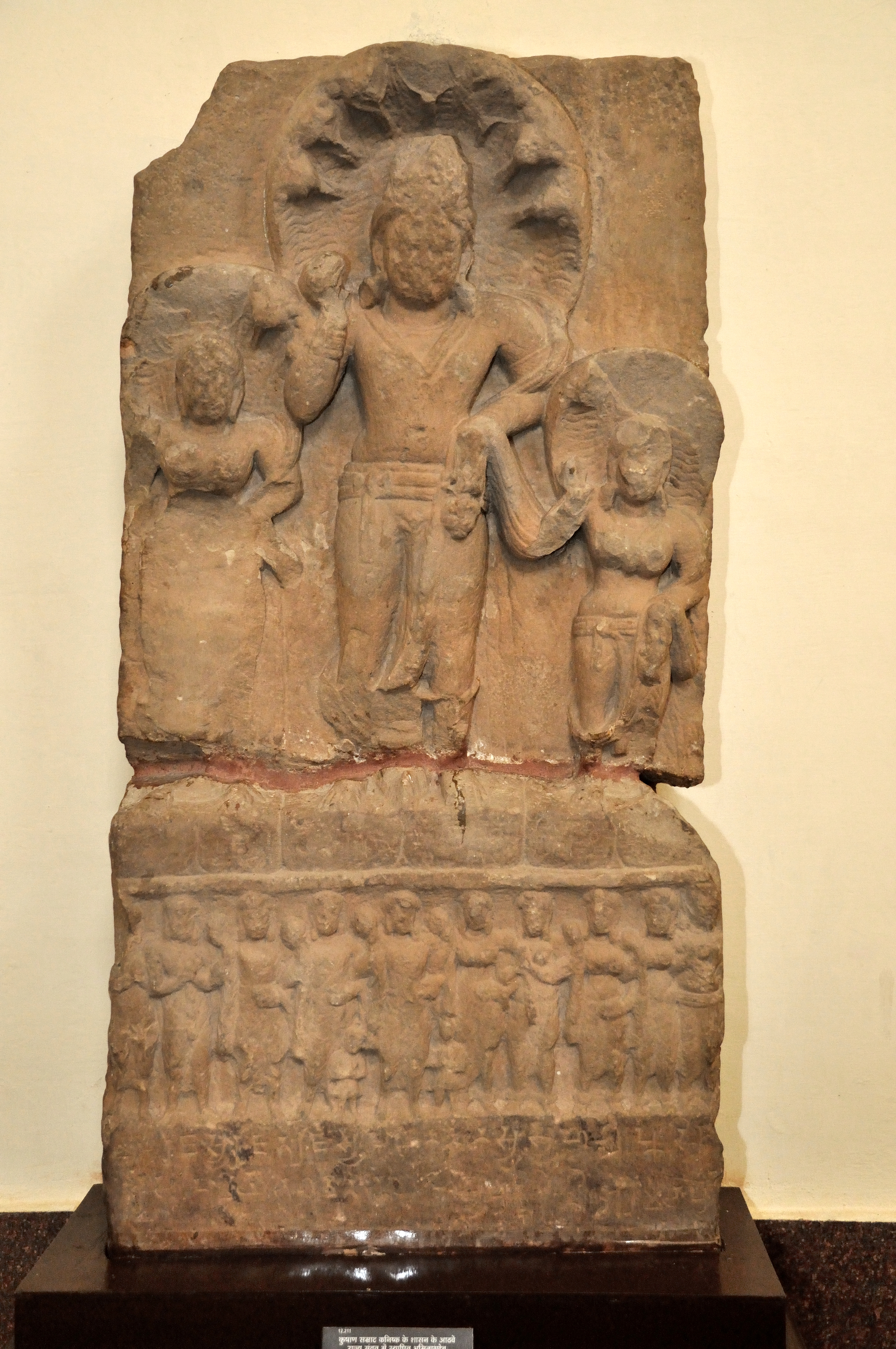
135 CE
Image of a Nāga between two Nāgīs, inscribed in "the year 8 of Emperor Kanishka". 135 CE.

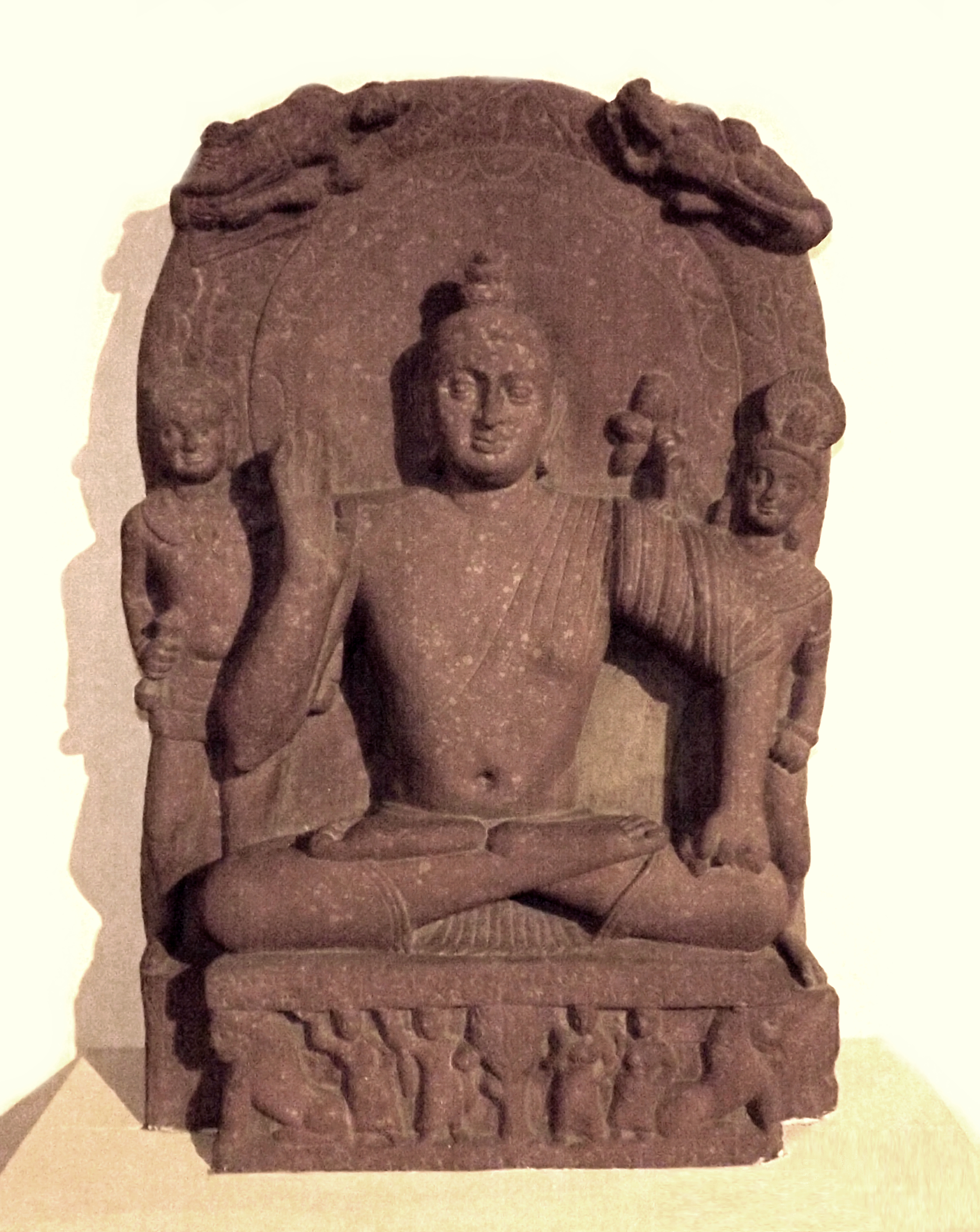
159 CE
Seated Bodhisattva, inscribed "Year 32" of Kanishka (159 CE), Mathura.

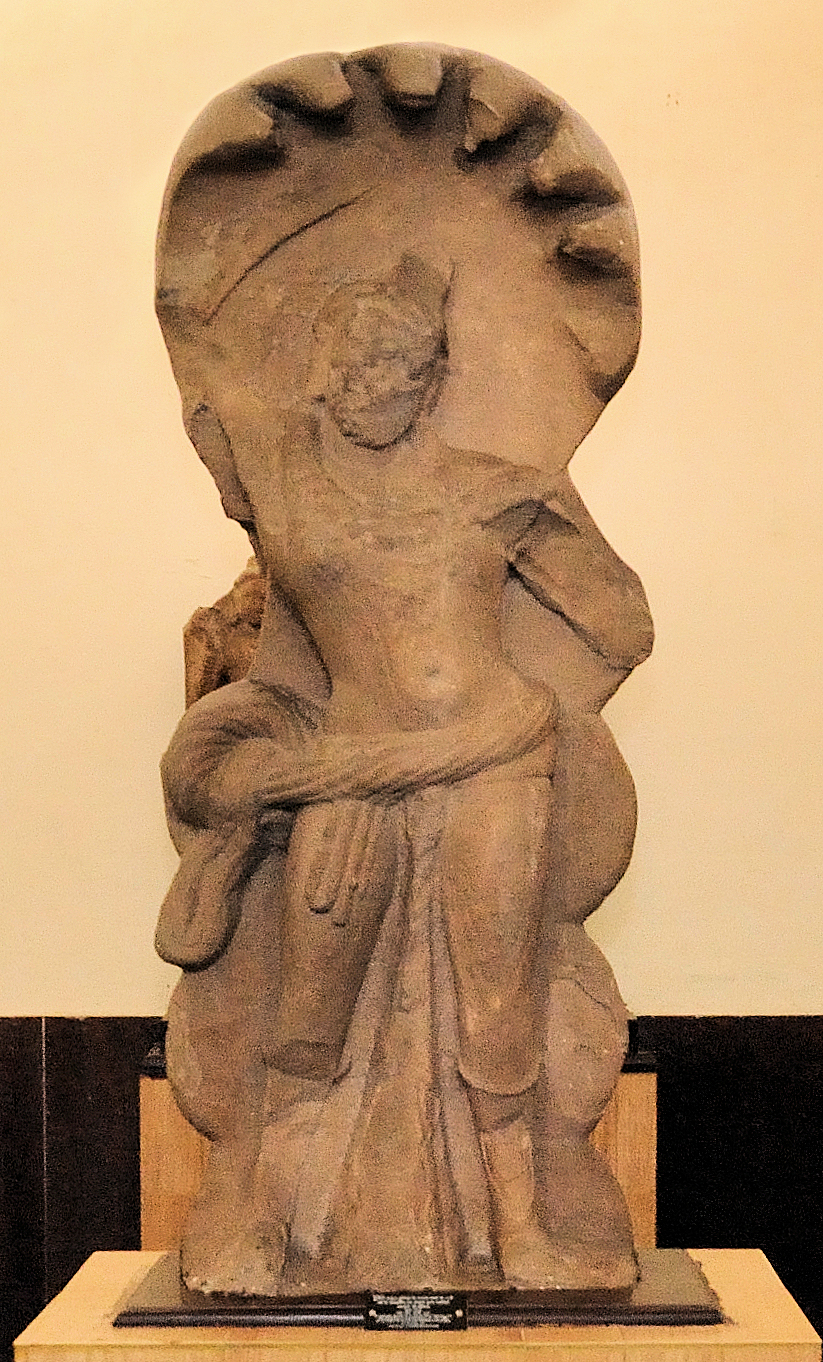
140-180 CE
Huvishka:
Nāga statue with inscription from the reign of Huvishka (140–180 CE)

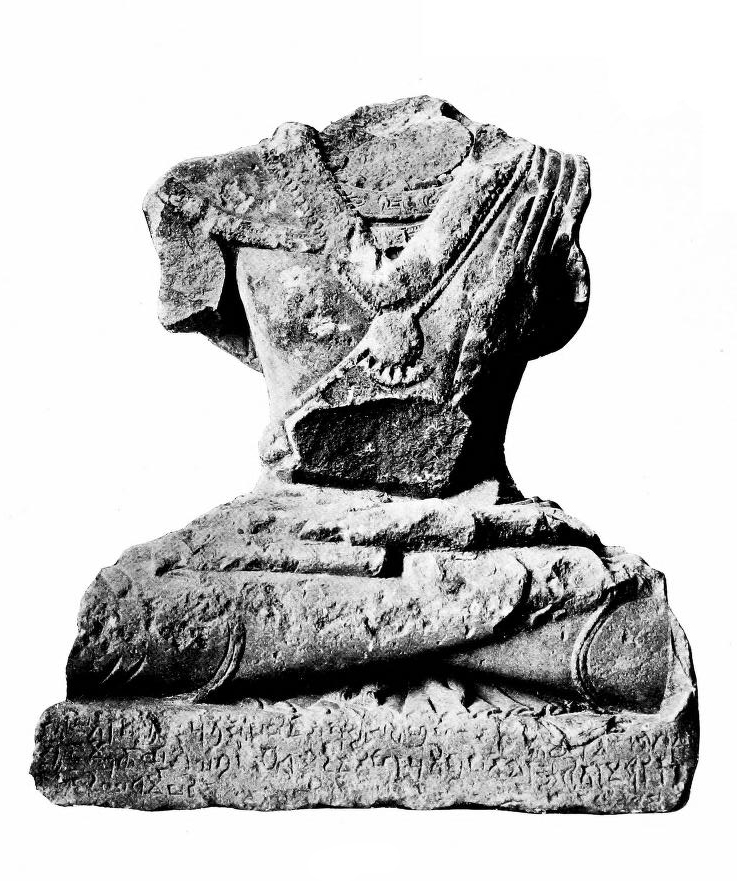
c.270 CE
Bodhisattva with inscription of Year 28 of Kushan King Vasishka, art of Mathura, found in Sanchi.

== Kushan coinage ==
The coinage of the Kushans was abundant and an important tool of propaganda in promoting each Kushan ruler. One of the names for Kushan coins was Dinara, which ultimately came from the Roman name Denarius aureus. The coinage of the Kushans was copied as far as the Kushano-Sasanians in the west, and the kingdom of Samatata in Bengal to the east. The coinage of the Gupta Empire was also initially derived from the coinage of the Kushan Empire, adopting its weight standard, techniques, and designs, following the conquests of Samudragupta in the northwest. The imagery on Gupta coins then became more Indian in both style and subject matter compared to earlier dynasties, where Greco-Roman and Persian styles were mostly followed.

== Influence of the Parthian cultural sphere ==
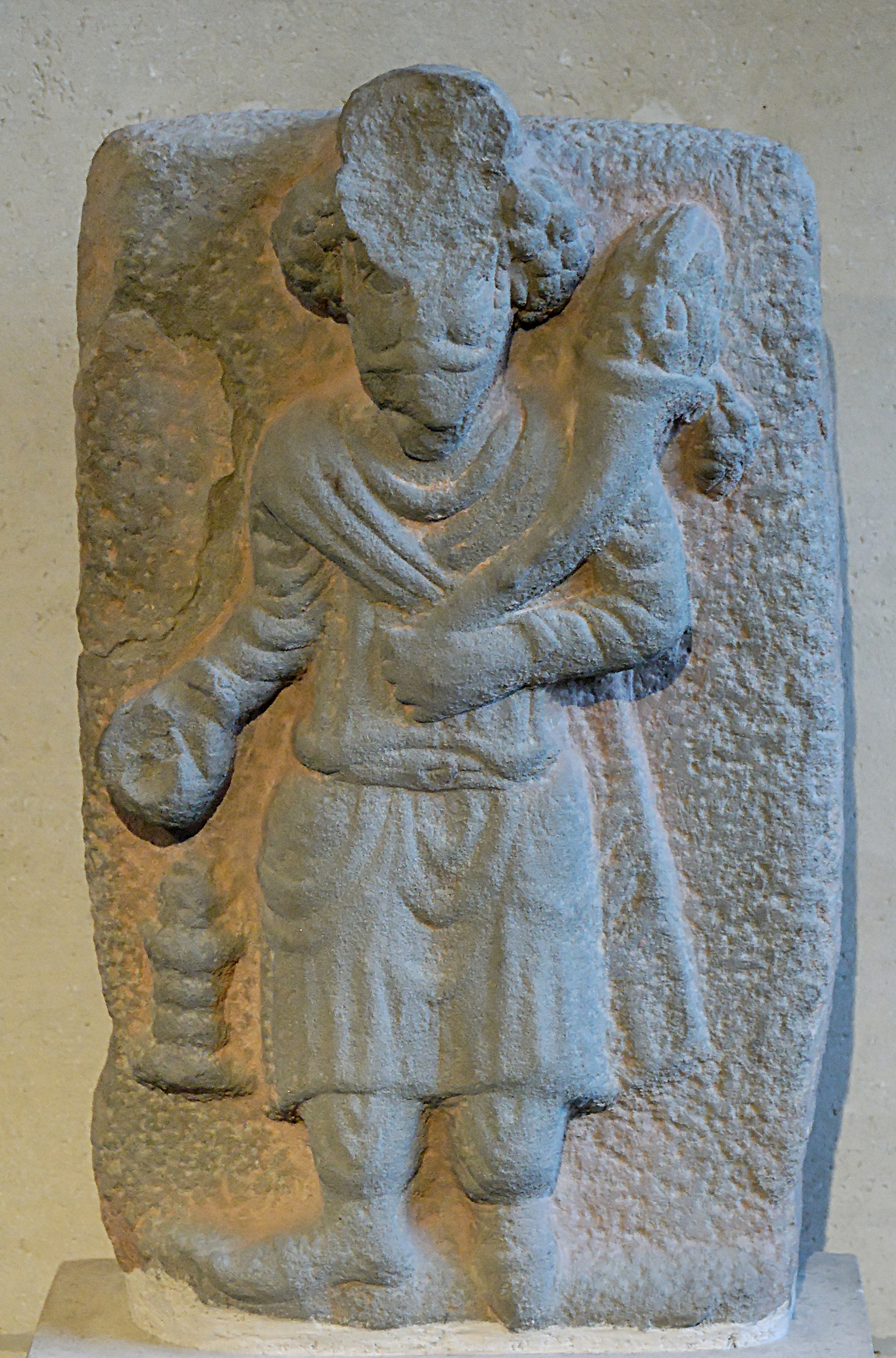
Parthian king making an offering to god Herakles-Verethragna. Masdjid-e Suleiman, Iran. 2nd-3rd century AD. Louvre Museum Sb 7302.

According to John M. Rosenfield, the statuary of the Kushans has strong similarities with the art of the Parthian cultural area. Similarities are numerous in terms of clothing, decorative elements, or posture, which tend to be massive and frontal, with feet often splayed. In particular, the statuary of Hatra, which has remained in a relatively good state of preservation, shows such similarities. This could be due either to direct cultural exchanges between the area of Mesopotamia and the Kushan Empire at that time, or from a common Parthian artistic background leading to similar types of representation.

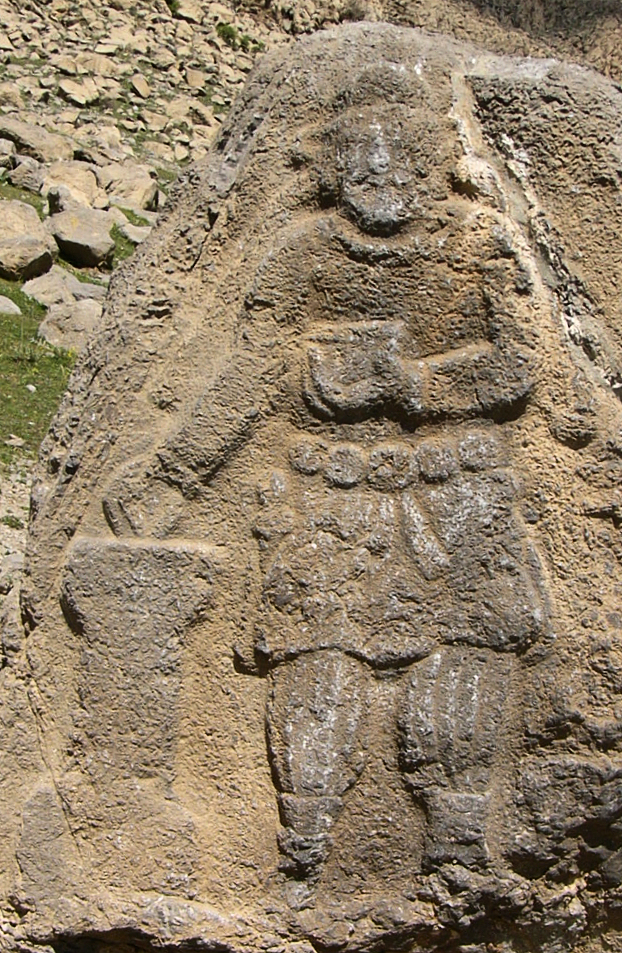
Rock relief of Parthian king at Behistun, most likely Vologases III (r. c. 110–147 AD)

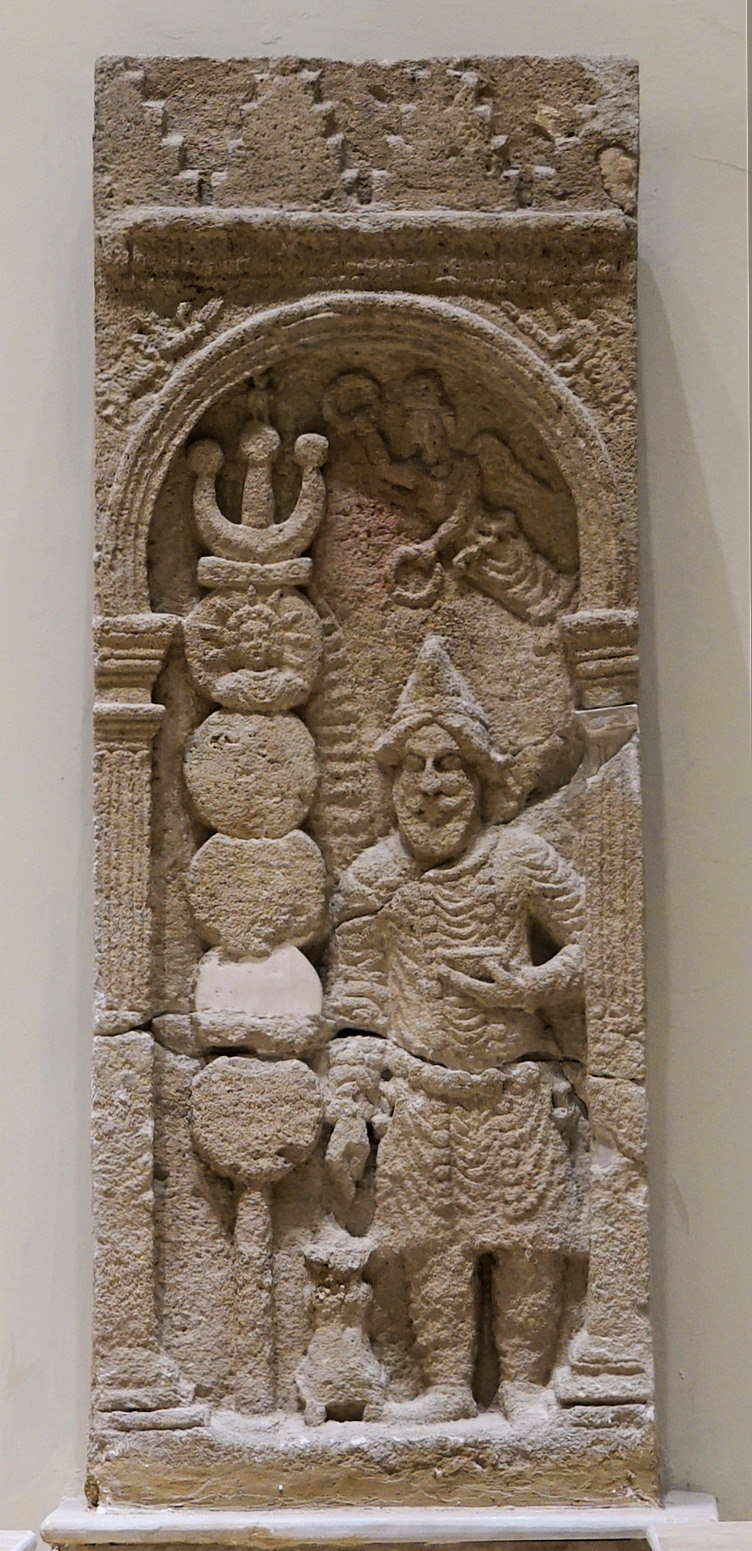
Victory relief of Sanatruq I. He is using a small altar at his feet.

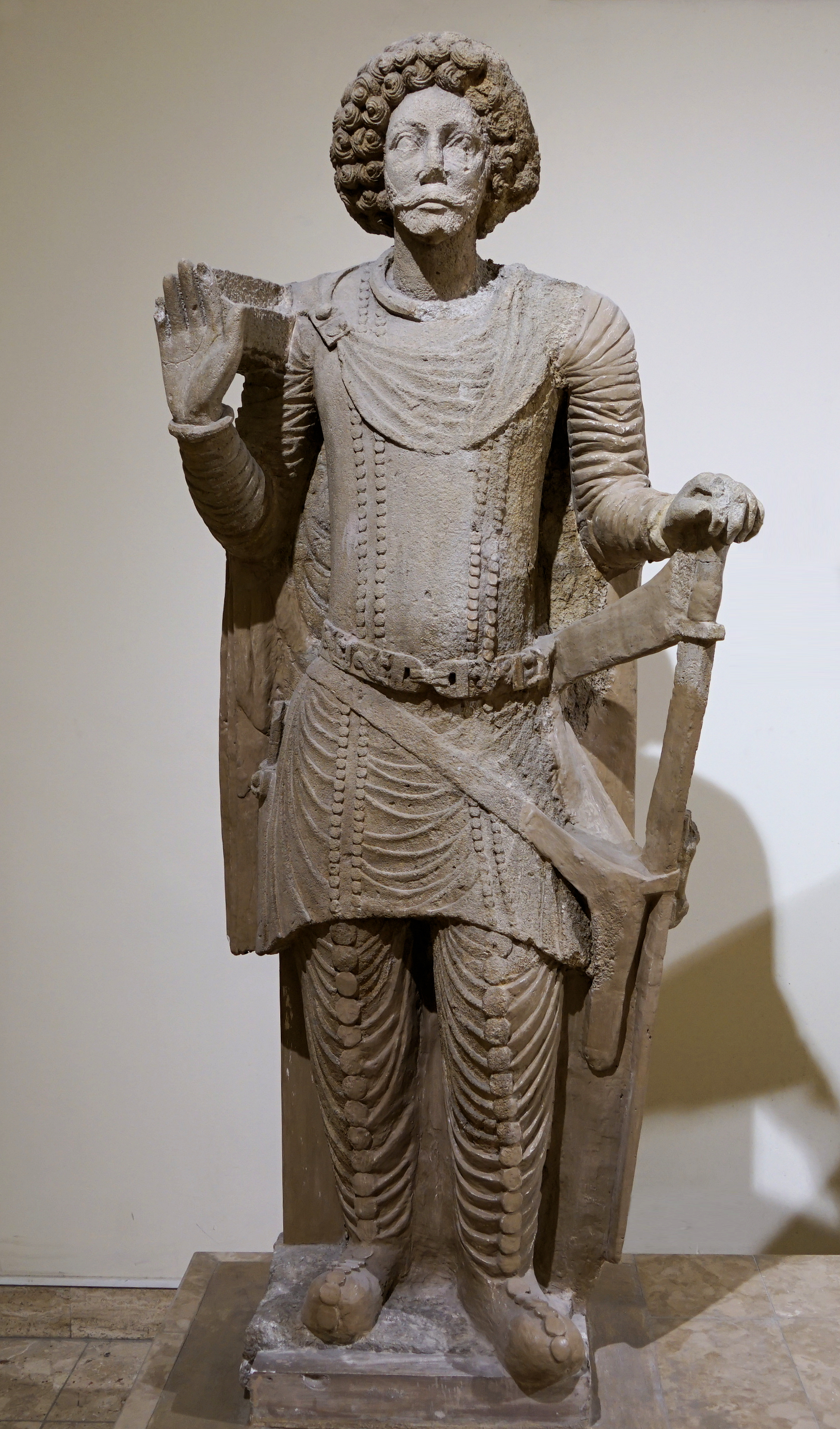
Military commander from the city of Hatra. National Museum of Iraq

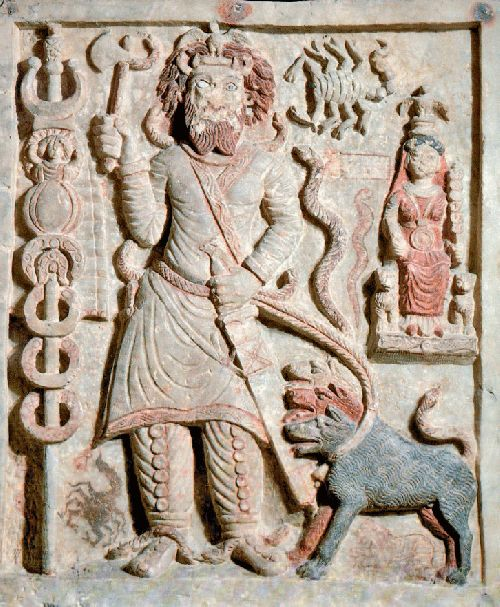
Relief of the god Nergal from Hatra.

== See also ==
- Indo-Scythians
- Greco-Buddhist art
- Gupta art
