= Brussels Buddha =

Greco-Buddhist sculpture

Brussels Buddha
(Inscribed "Year 5")

The Brussels Buddha, with the seated Buddha attended by Brahma and Indra in the back, and the Bodhisattvas Maitreya and Avalokitesvara in the front.

Location of Gandhara, where the Brussels Buddha was probably created.

The Brussels Buddha is a famous Buddha statue from the Greco-Buddhist art of Gandhara. It is named after the first collection to which it belonged, the Claude de Marteau collection in Brussels, Belgium, although it is now in a private collection in Japan, belonging to the Agonshū sect of Buddhism. The Brussels Buddha belongs to the category of the "Seated Buddha triads", which can be seen contemporaneously in the Greco-Buddhist art of Gandhara and in the art of Mathura in the early Kushan period. The precise location where the statue was discovered is unknown, but it was acquired in Peshawar, and it is thought to have been excavated in Sahri Bahlol due to its similarity with a statue from the same location, now in the Peshawar Museum.

== Characteristics ==
In this statue, the seated Buddha is attended by Brahma and Indra, as well as two Bodhisattvas. The scene shows the "Miracle at Śrāvastī".

The statue is remarkable in that it is one of the rare Gandhara Buddhist statues to bear a dedication with a date. The inscription in Kharoshti reads:

Inscription of the Brussels Buddha
Original (Kharosthi script)	Transliteration	English translation
𐨯𐨎 𐩃 𐩀 𐨥𐨒𐨂𐨣𐨯𐨨𐨯𐨯 𐨡𐨁 𐨤𐨎𐨕𐨨𐨁 𐨦𐨂𐨢𐨣𐨡𐨯 𐨟𐨿𐨪𐨅𐨤𐨁𐨜𐨐𐨯 𐨡𐨣𐨨𐨂𐨑𐨅 𐨨𐨡𐨤𐨁𐨡𐨪𐨣 𐨀𐨢𐨿𐨬𐨡𐨁𐨡𐨣 𐨤𐨂𐨩𐨩 𐨧𐨬𐨟𐨂	saṃ 4 1 Phagunasamasasa di paṃcami Budhansadasa trepiḍakasa danamukhe madapidarana adhvadidana puyaya bhavatu	In the year 5, in the 5th day of the month Phalguna: the pious gift of the Monk Buddhananda, learned in the Tripiṭaka: may it be for the honouring of his deceased (?) mother and father.

The date "Year 5" should normally refer to the Kanishka era, now thought to start in 127 CE, giving a date of 132 CE. However, the advanced character of the iconography has led some authors to support a later date, based on a supposed second Kanishka era starting a century later or a theory according to which the hundreds would have been omitted from the date. Some much later dates have been suggested as well, for example a date in the Huna era of Khingila, which would give a period circa the 5th century CE, but such a date can be considered as too late. A date in the Gupta era has also been suggested, but there is no evidence of the Gupta era being used so far north.

According to Gérard Fussman, who analyzed the paleography of the inscription, there is no doubt that "Year 5" corresponds to the era of Kanishka I, as the shapes of several letters are typical of that period. The language of the inscription is a mix of Prakrit and Sanskrit. This dated sculpture suggests that the Greco-Buddhist art of Gandhara was already at a very advanced stage of sophistication at the beginning of the Kushan period, in the early 2nd century CE, implying the existence of a long preliminary tradition leading up to it.

== Other examples ==
There are a few examples of similar triads in Gandhara as well as in Mathura, most dated to the early Kushans:

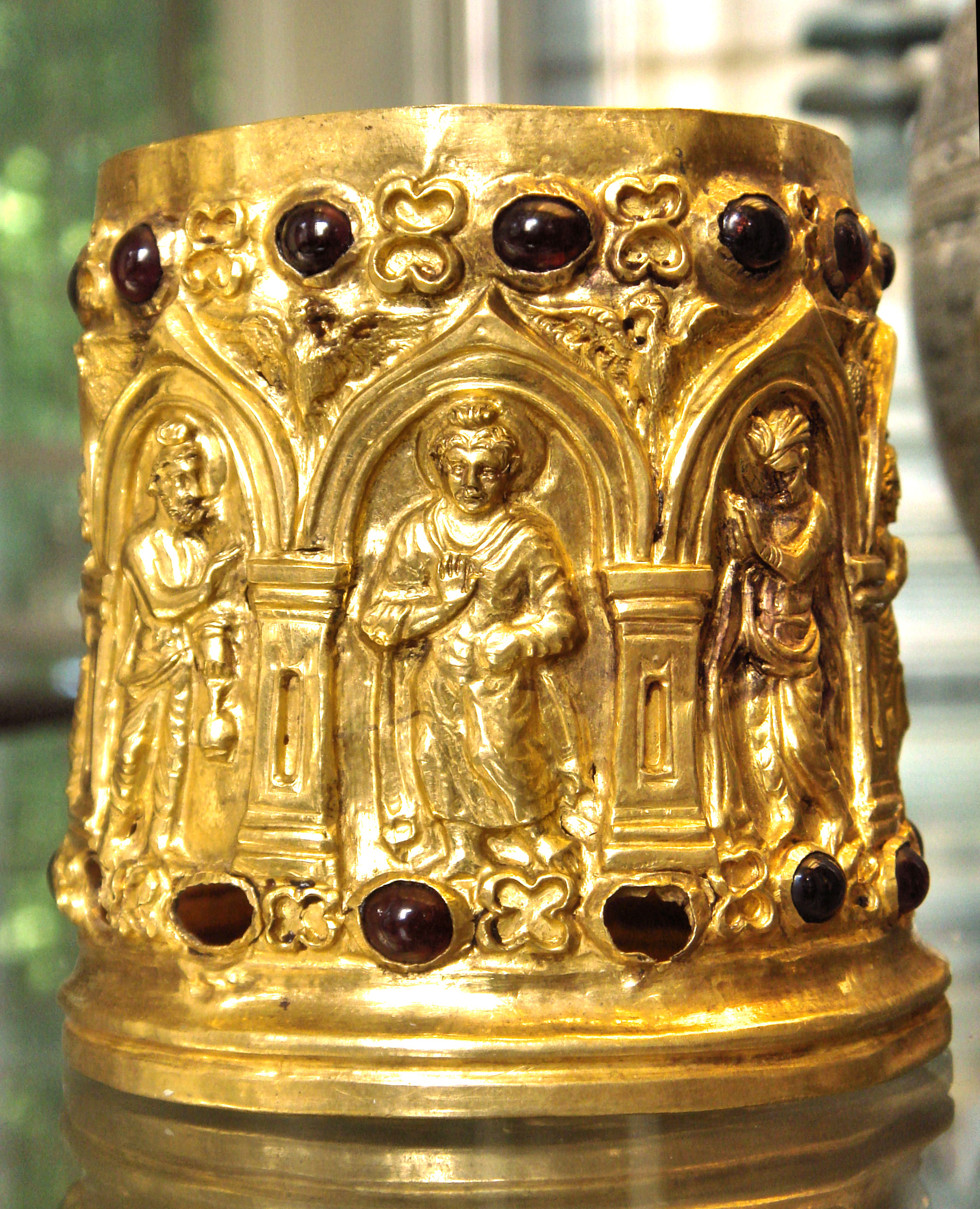
An early standing triad with Brahma, the Buddha and Indra. Bimaran casket, circa 10 CE.

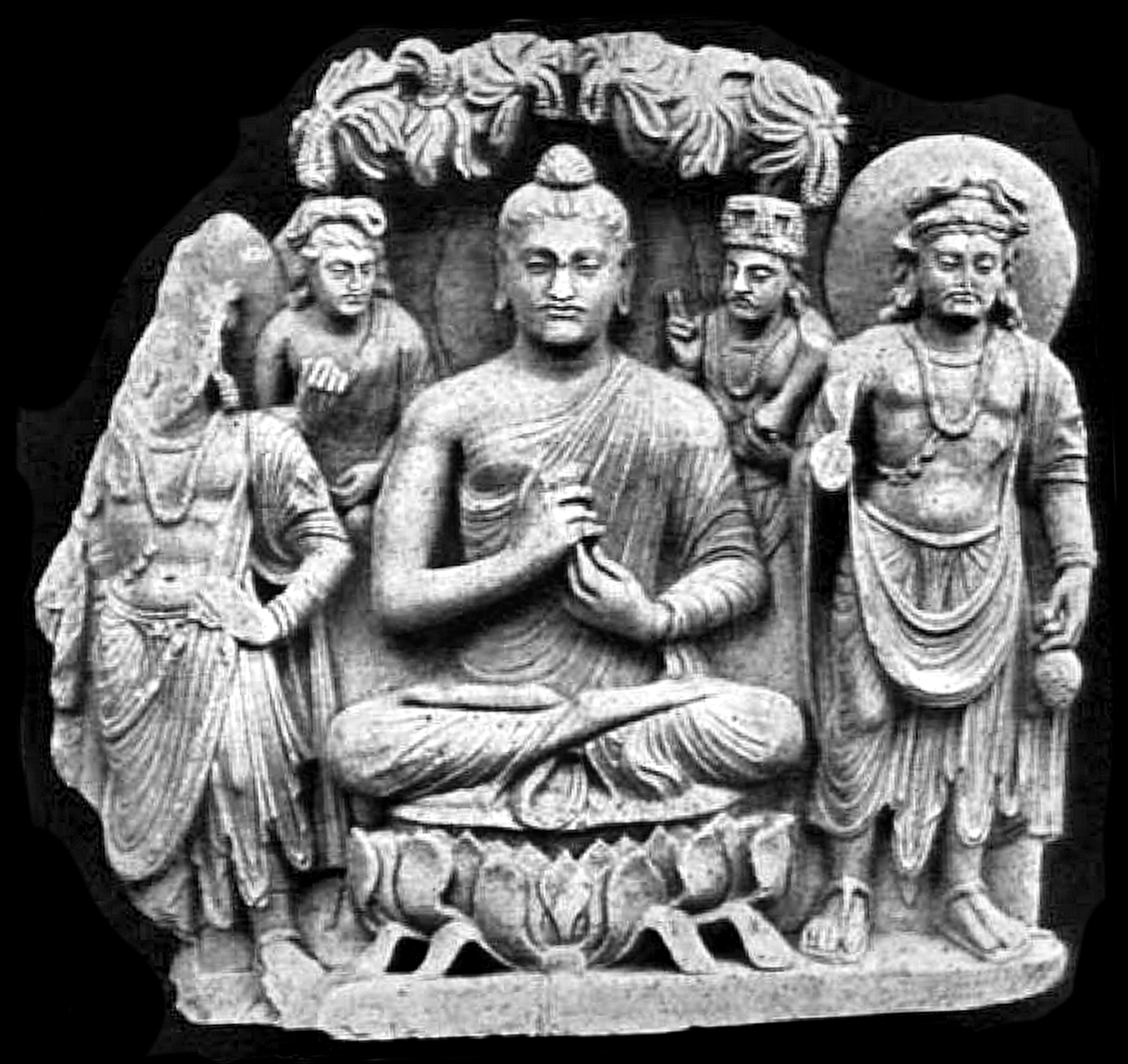
A very similar Buddhist Triad from Sahr-i-Bahlol. Peshawar Museum.

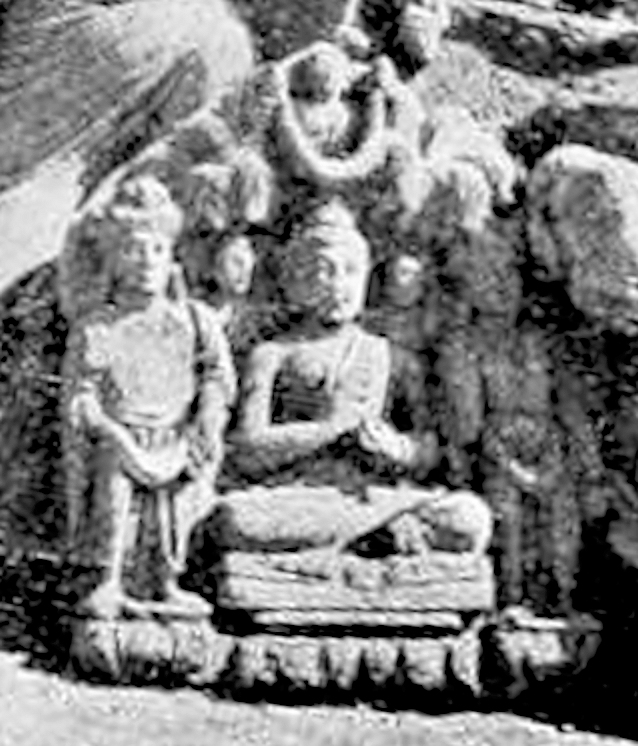
Seated Buddha triad, Sahr-i-Bahlol excavations, 1911-1912.

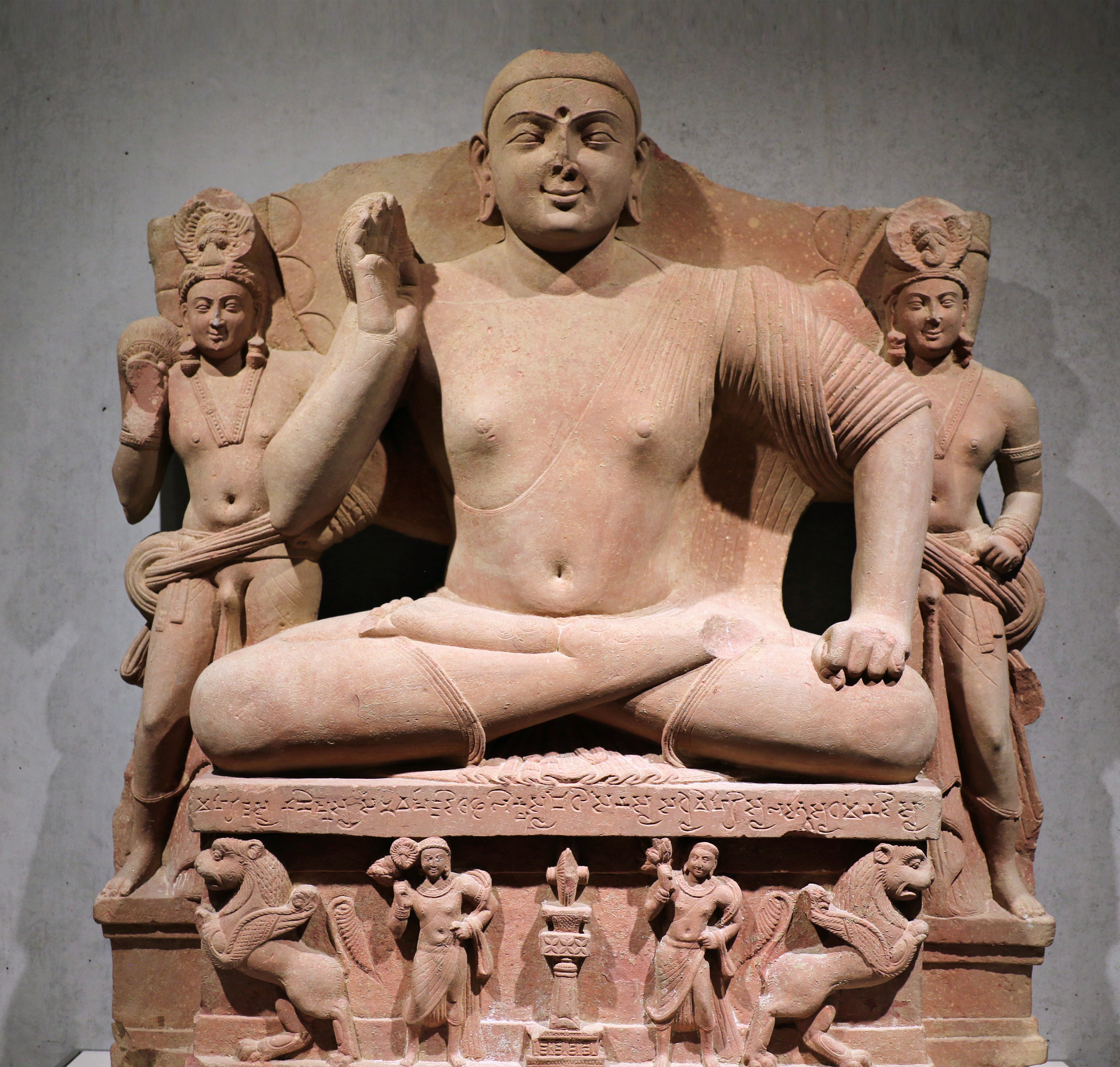
A contemporary triad from the Art of Mathura, the Kimbell seated Bodhisattva (inscribed "Year 4 of Kanishka").

== See also ==
- Kimbell seated Bodhisattva, a possibly contemporary Buddhist triad from Mathura
