= Kimbell seated Bodhisattva =

Statue of a bodhisattva

Kimbell seated Bodhisattva
("Year 4 of the Great King Kanishka")

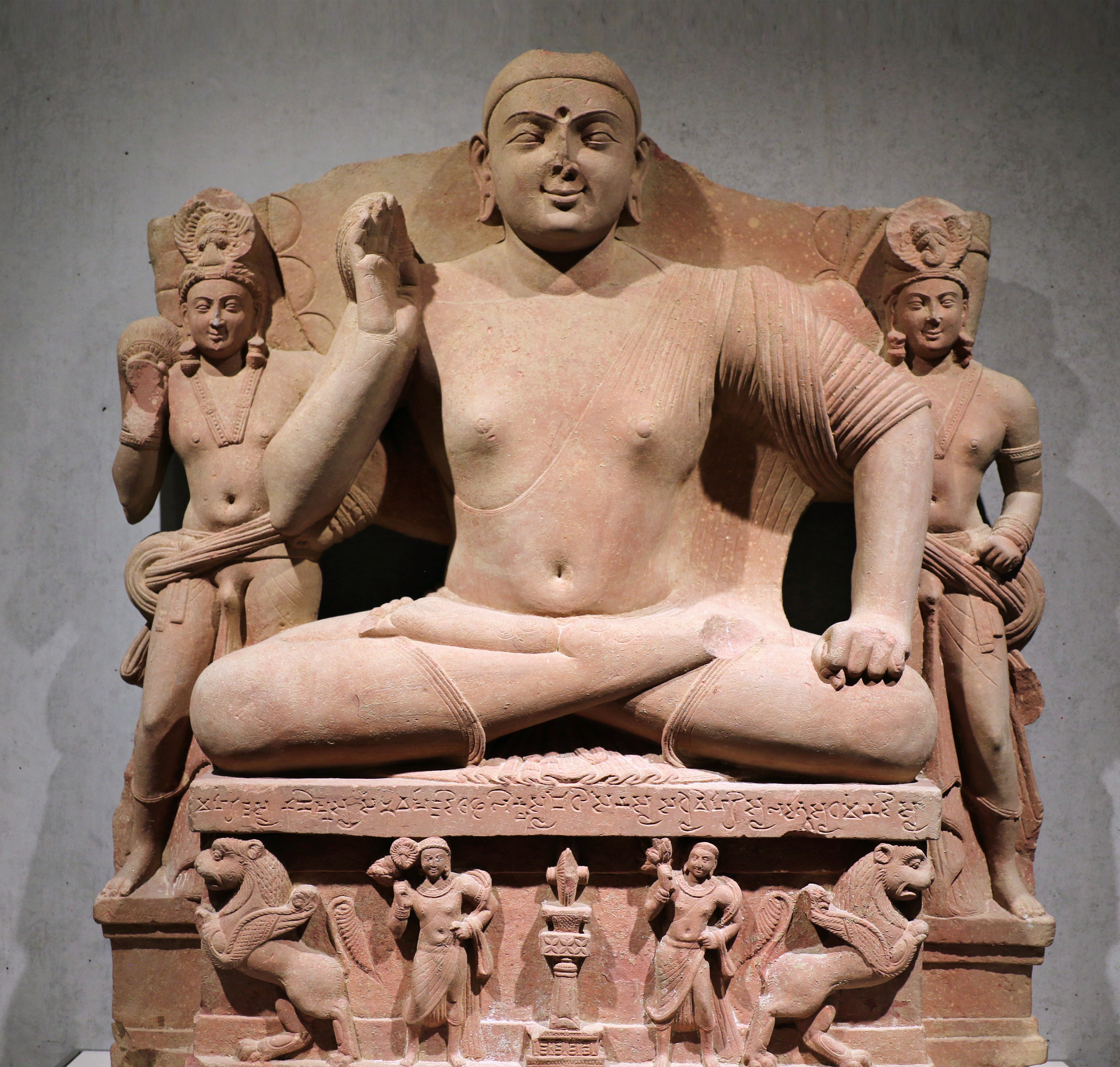
Kimbell seated Bodhisattva with attendants, 131 CE, Mathura. Kimbell Art Museum

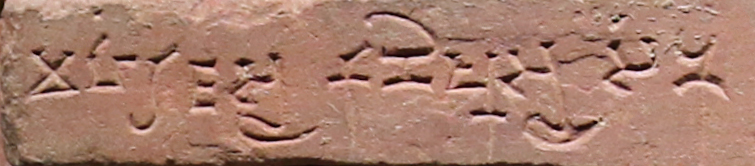
On the pedestal, Brahmi inscription:
𑁕
Maharajasya Kanishkasya Sam 4
"Year 4 of the Great King Kanishka"

Location of the city of Mathura.

The Kimbell seated Bodhisattva is a statue of a "bodhisattva" (probably the Buddha after his renunciation of princely life, but before his Enlightenment) from the art of Mathura, now in the Kimbell Art Museum in Fort Worth, Texas. The statue is dated to 131 CE, by an inscription recording its dedication in "Year 4 of the Great King Kanishka", since the date of the beginning of Kanishka's reign is thought to be 127 CE. The Kimbell seated Bodhisattva belongs to the category of the "Seated Buddha triads", which can be seen contemporaneously in the Greco-Buddhist art of Gandhara and in the art of Mathura in the early Kushan period.

== Style ==
The Kushans adopted the anthropomorphic image of the Buddha, probably developed during the 1st century CE in Mathura and Gandhara, and transformed it into a standardized mode of representation, using "confident and powerful imagery" on a grand scale. Free-standing statues of the Buddha appear around this time, possibly encouraged by doctrinal changes in Buddhism allowing to depart from the aniconism that had prevailed in the Buddhist sculptures at Mathura, Bharhut or Sanchi from the end of the 2nd century BCE. The Greco-Buddhist art of Gandhara appears to have fully developed around this time too, also under the rule of the Kushans, following on earlier imagery such as the Bimaran casket or the Butkara seated Buddha at the Butkara Stupa in Swat.

The Kimbell seated Bodhisattva belongs to a type known as the "Kapardin" statue of the Buddha, characterized by a "Kapardin" coil of hair on the top of the head. The top of the statue was broken, and a full decorated aureola with flying attendants initially stood behind the image of the Buddha. He is flanked by two attendants holding fly whisks in a sign of devotion. The relief on the pedestal centers on a dharma wheel seen edge on, on a base, with two attendants holding flowers, and two winged lions on the sides.

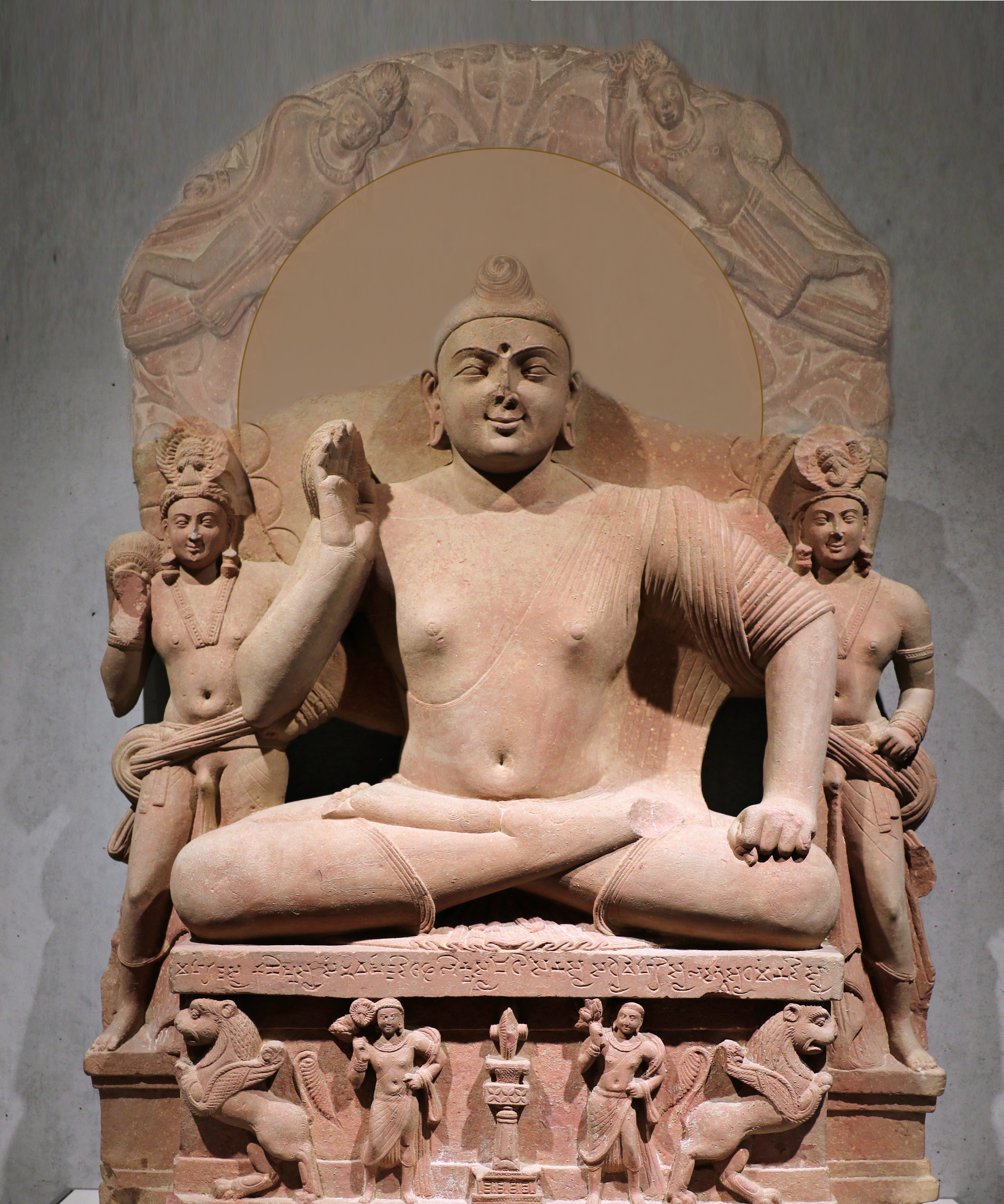
Kimbell seated Buddha with attendants, Mathura (reconstruction of original proportions).

Technically, the image mentions the "Bodhisattva" rather than the "Buddha", which would mean the Buddha just before his enlightenment, as the image of the Buddha after his enlightenment would arguably have been considered at this period to be beyond the capabilities of human illustration. There has been a recurring debate about the exact identity of these Mathura statues, some claiming that they are only statues of Bodhisattavas, which is indeed the exact term used in most of the inscriptions of the statues found in Mathura. Only one or two statues of the Mathura type are known to mention the Buddha himself. This could be in conformity with an ancient Buddhist prohibition against showing the Buddha himself in human form, otherwise known as aniconism in Buddhism, expressed in the Sarvastivada vinaya (rules of the early Buddhist school of the Sarvastivada): ""Since it is not permitted to make an image of the Buddha's body, I pray that the Buddha will grant that I can make an image of the attendant Bodhisattva. Is that acceptable?" The Buddha answered: "You may make an image of the Bodhisattava"". However the scenes in the Isapur Buddha and the later Indrasala Buddha (dated 50-100 CE), refer to events which are considered to have happened after the Buddha's enlightenment, and therefore probably represent the Buddha rather than his younger self as a Bodhisattava, or a simple attendant Bodhisattva. Because of these elements, it is thought that the terms "Bodhisattva" and "Buddha" in the dedicatory inscriptions of early art of Mathura are relatively interchangeable.

== Inscription ==
The inscription is very clear and redacted in hybrid Sanskrit. A complete photograph of the inscription was published by Fussman. It reads:

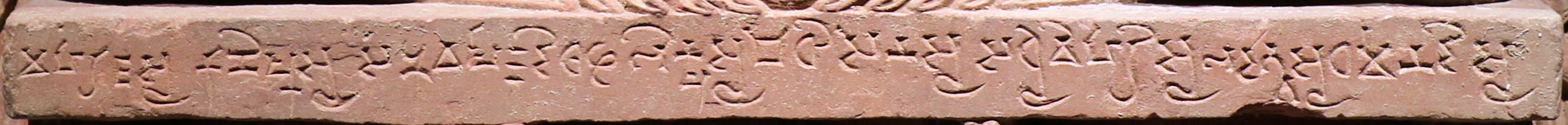
First line of the inscription (on the top of the pedestal). It starts with _{𑁕} Maharajasya Kanishkasya Sam 4: "Year 4 of the Great King Kanishka"

Maharajasya Kanishkasya sam 4 varsa 3 di 20+6 bhisusya Bodhisenasya sadhyeviharisya bhadattasya Dharmanadisya
Bodhisattvo pratistapitho svakayam cetiyakuteyam saha matapitahi saha pitasikaye Badraye
saha sarvasatvehi

"In the year 4 of King Kanihska, in the month 3 of the rains, on the 26th day, the venerable Dharmanandin, disciple of the monk Bodhisena, established this Bodhisattva in his own sanctuary. With his father and mother, and (paternal aunt?) Bhadra, with all beings".

— Transliteration and translation by Gérard Fussman.

Most importantly, the inscription mentions the reign of the Kushan ruler Kanishka, and a regnal date, allowing to date precisely the statue, based on the conventionally agreed date of 127 CE for the start of the reign of Kanishka: "Year 4 of the Great King Kanishka" appears in Brahmi at the beginning of the inscription on the pedestal, implying a date of 131 CE for the dedication of the statue. An alternative starting date for his reign is 78 CE, which would give a date of 82 CE for the statue.

== Similar statuary (1st–2nd century CE) ==
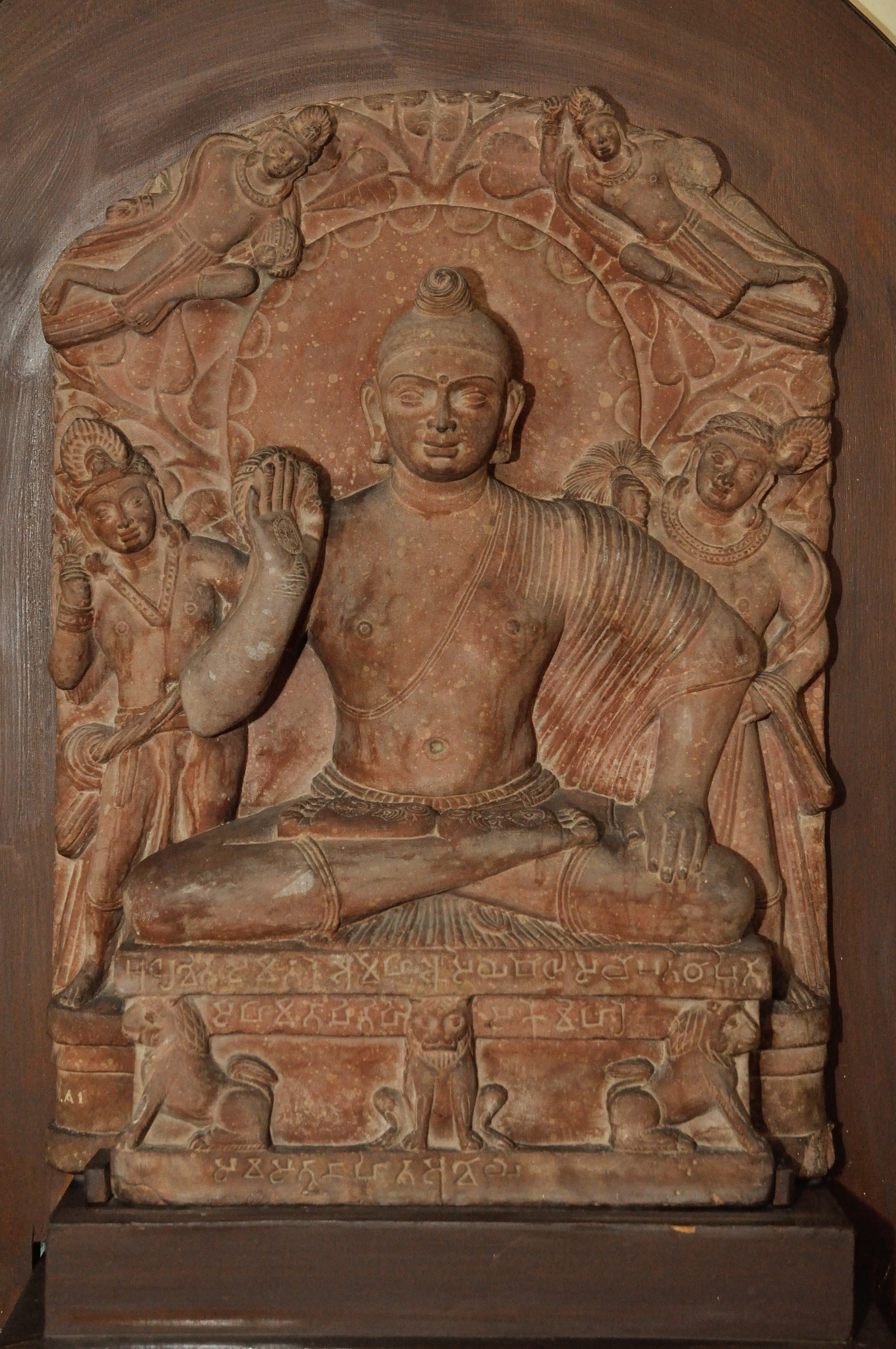
Seated Bodhisattva Shakyamuni in Abhaya Mudra. Dated a bit earlier, to the period of the Northern Satraps, end of 1st century CE, Art of Mathura.

A relatively large number of similar statues are known from Mathura. The Kimbell Bodhisattva in one of only five known dated "Kapardin" statues of the Buddha. The style of these statues is somewhat reminiscent of the earlier monumental Yaksha statues, usually dated to one or two centuries earlier.

Several seated Buddha triads in an elaborate style are known from the Greco-Buddhist art of Gandhara, such as the Brussels Buddha, which may also be dated to the early years of Kanishka.

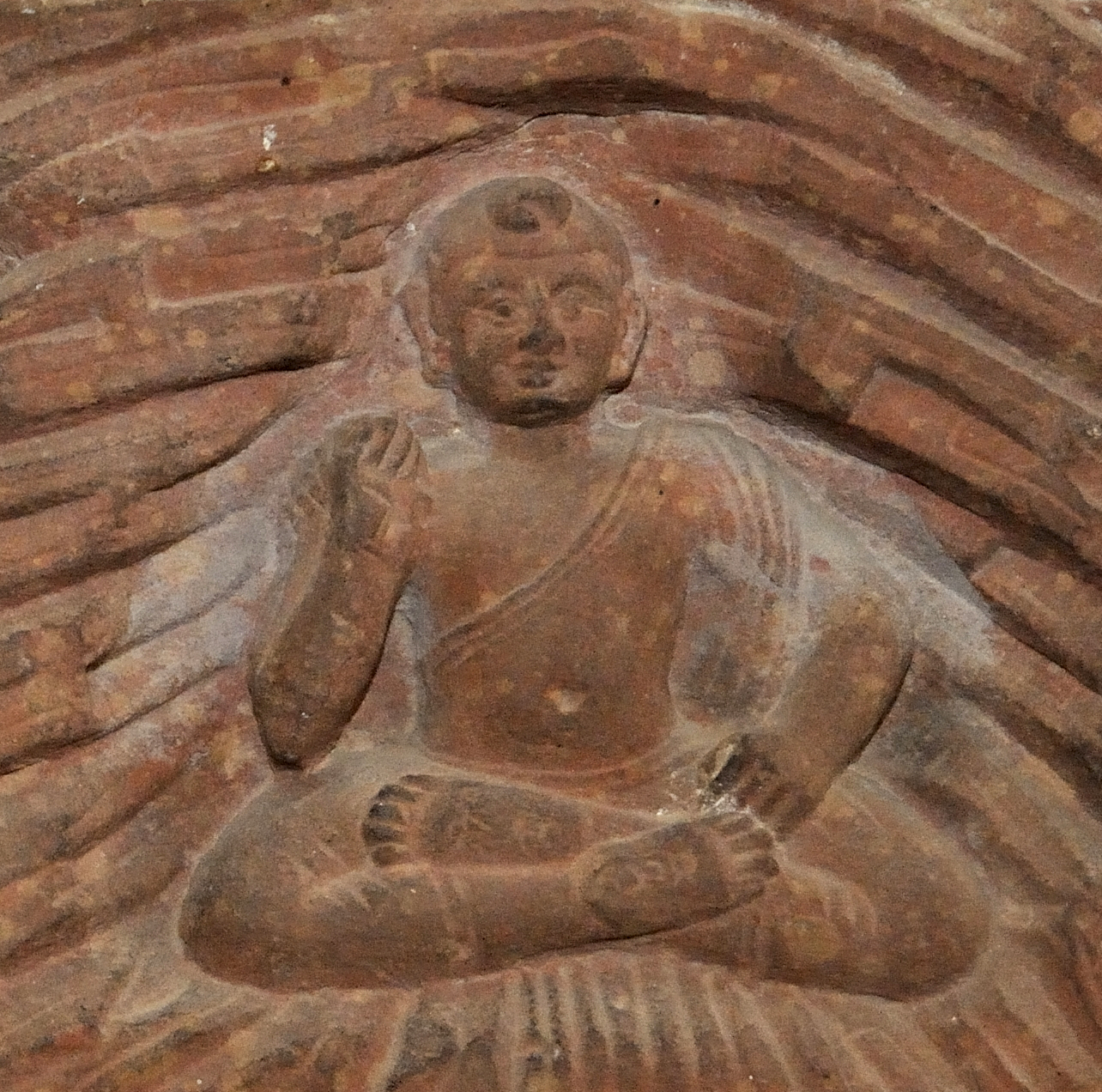
"Indrasala architrave", detail of the Buddha in Indrasala Cave, 50-100 CE.

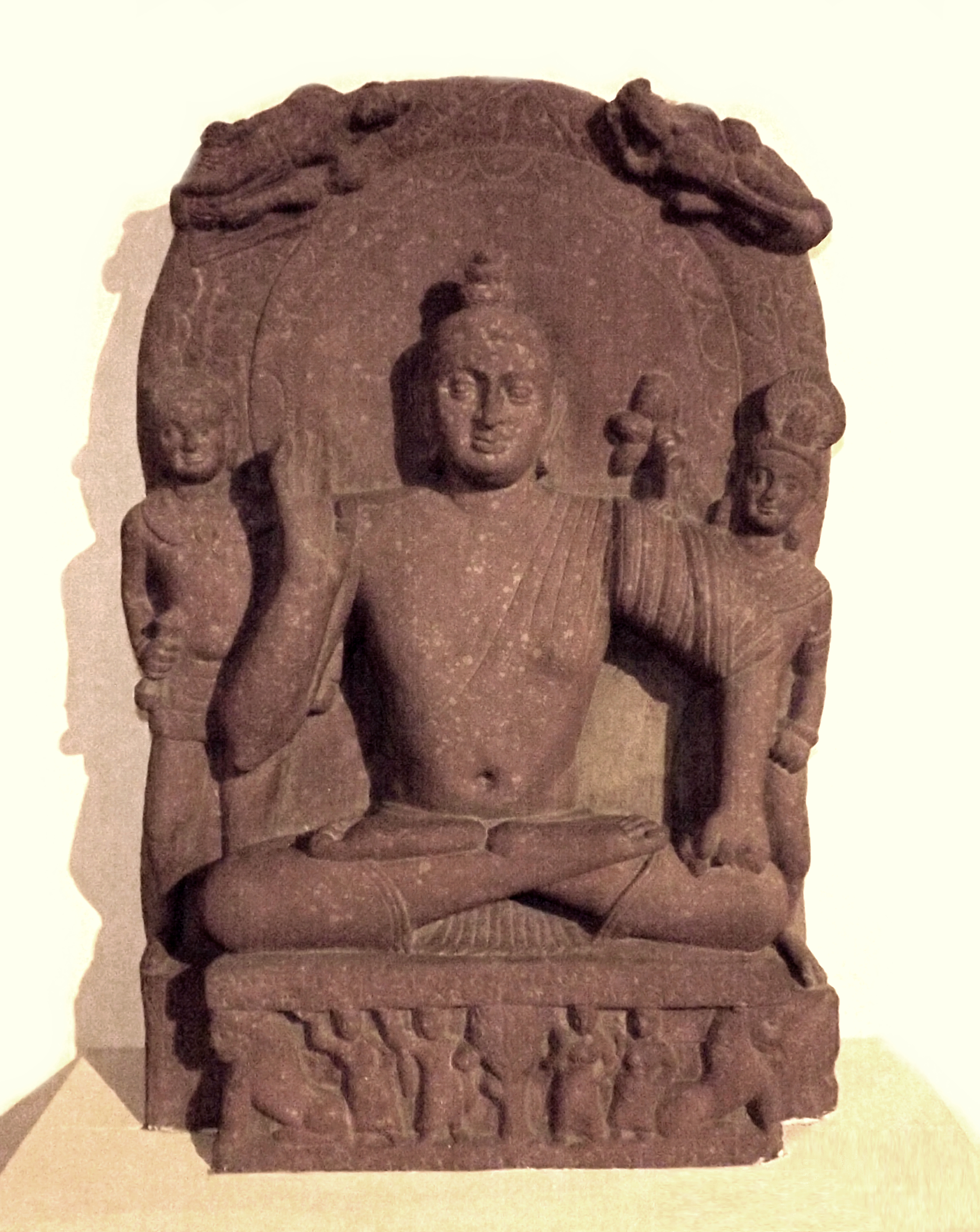
Seated Buddha, inscribed "Year 32" of Kanishka (159 CE), Mathura.

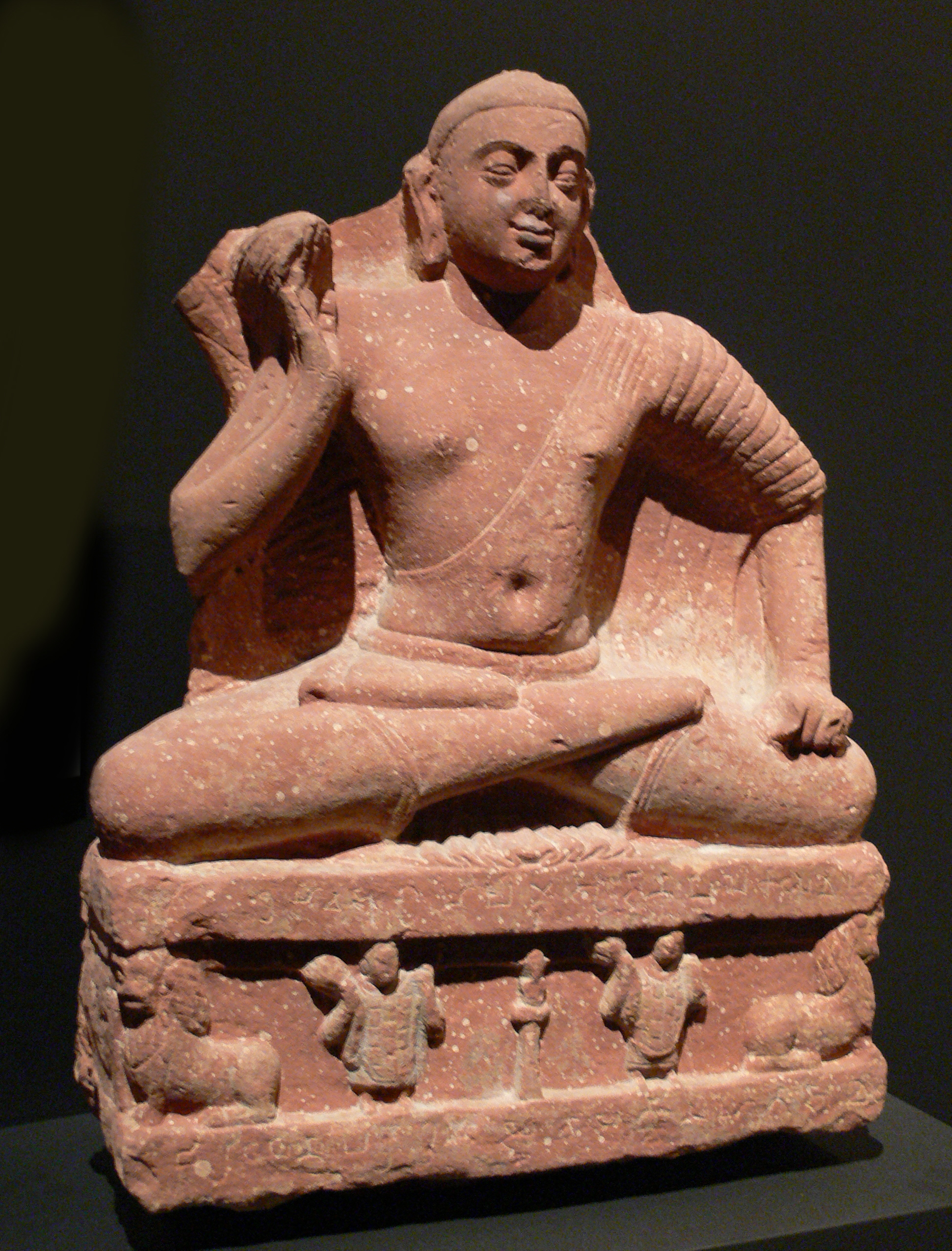
"Mahapurusha Buddha", Mathura

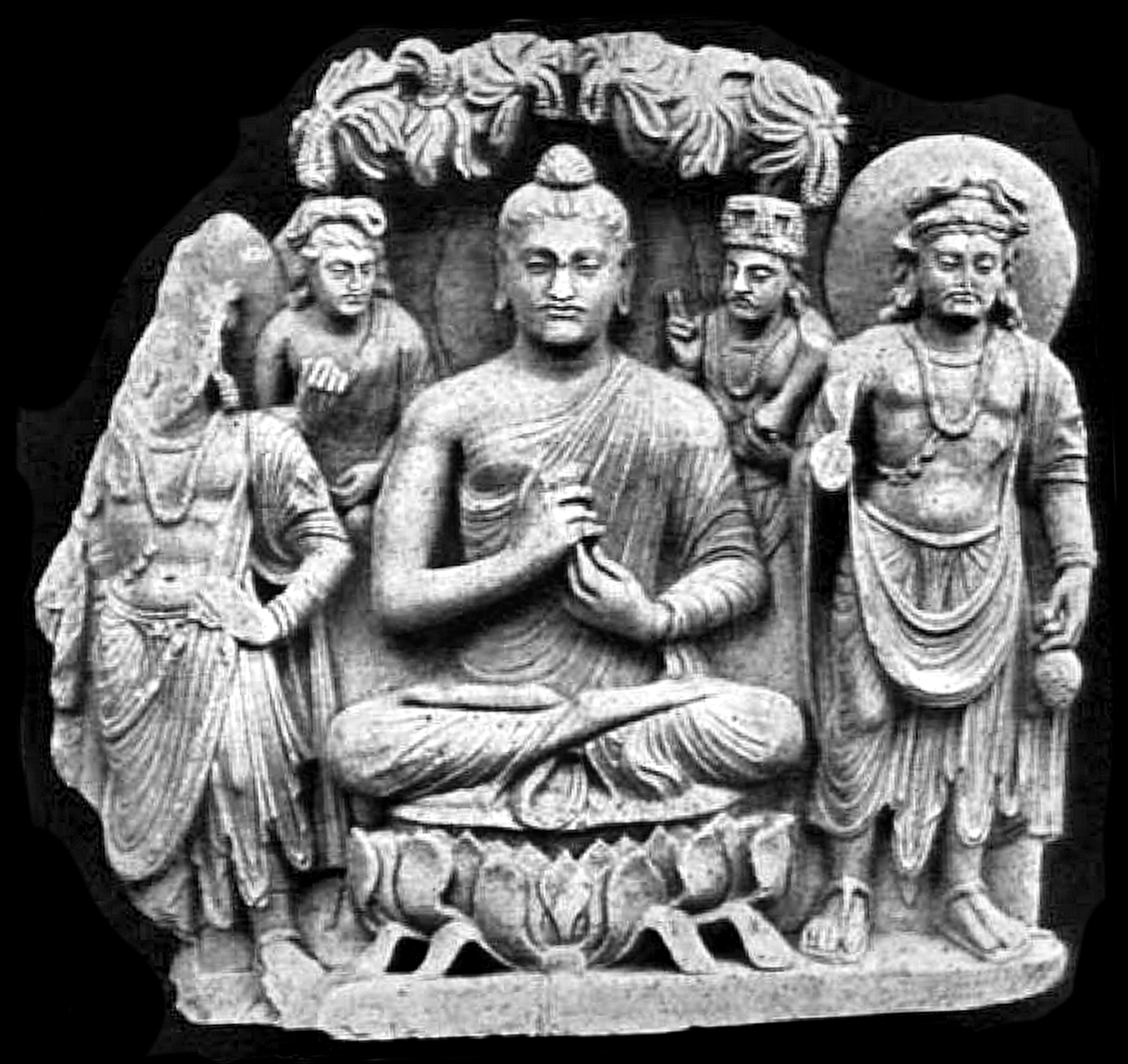
Type of the Brussels Buddha, a similar Buddhist triad from Gandhara, probably also dating to the year 5 of Kanishka.
