= Peshawar Museum =

Art museum in Peshawar, Pakistan

- د پېښور موزیم
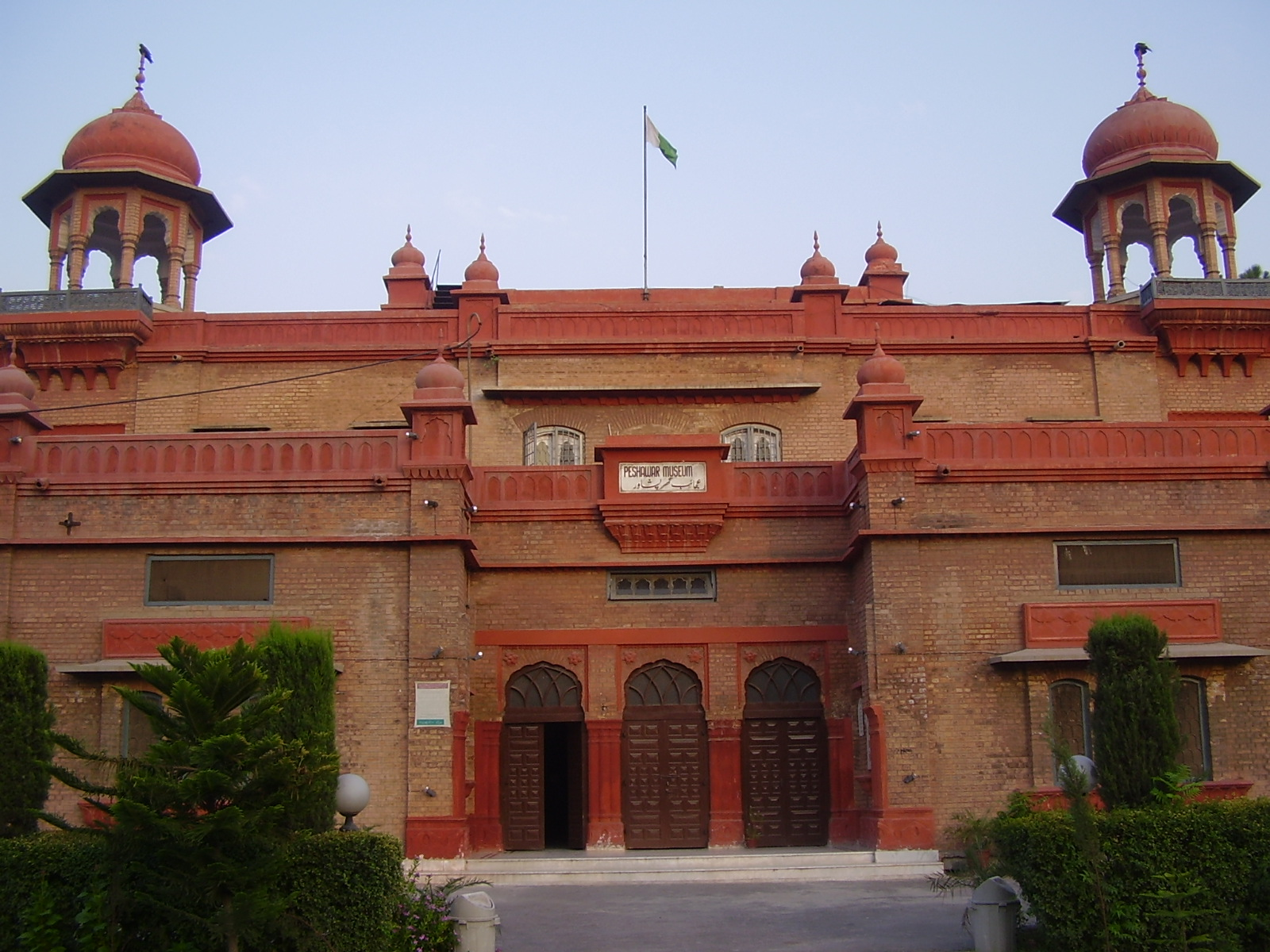
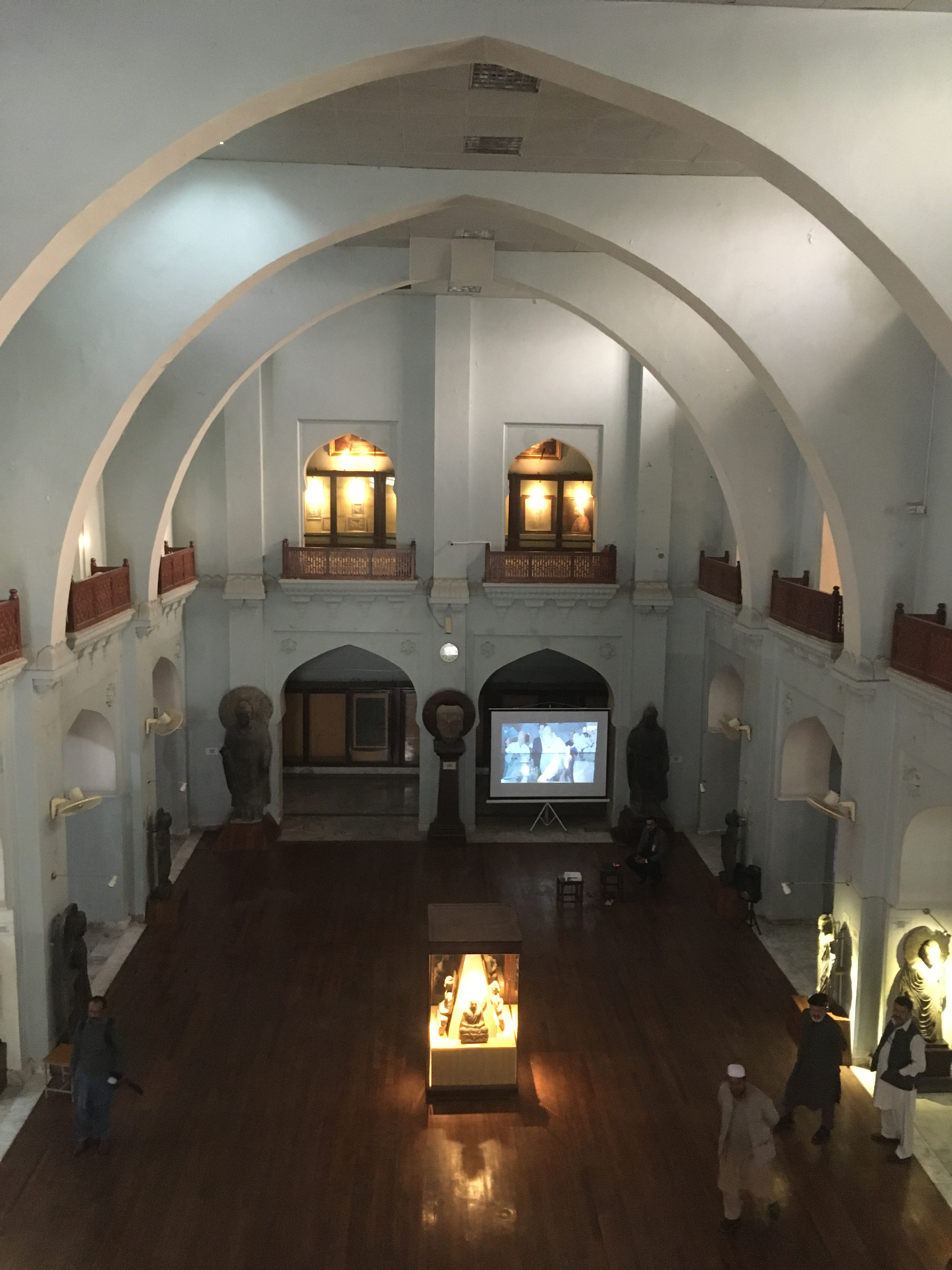
- The Peshawar Museum is noted for its collection of ancient Gandharan art Main hall of the Peshawar Museum
- Former name: Victoria Hall
- Established: 1907
- Location: Peshawar, Khyber Pakhtunkhwa, Pakistan
- Coordinates: 34.0077°N 71.5583°E
- Owner: Government of Khyber Pakhtunkhwa
- Website: www.kparchaeology.com

The Peshawar Museum (Urdu: پشاور میوزیم Pashto: د پېښور موزیم ) is a museum located in Peshawar, capital of Pakistan's Khyber Pakhtunkhwa province. The museum houses a collection of Buddhist artwork from the ancient Gandhara region.

== Background ==
The Peshawar Museum was established in November 1907 in a building constructed in memory of Queen Victoria. The two-story building was built in a syncretic architectural style consisting of British, Hindu, Buddhist and Mughal Islamic styles.

Initially, the museum had only one exhibition hall, but two more were added in 1969–70. In 2004–05, the museum was further expanded with the construction of a new block with two galleries, two halls for the museum's collection in storage, offices for the provincial directorate of archaeology, a conservation laboratory and a cafeteria. The historic exhibition hall was also renovated at that time.

== Collection ==
The current collection consists of nearly 14,000 items based on Gandhara, Greco-Buddhist, Kushan, Parthian, and Indo-Scythian culture. The collection includes art, sculptures, coins, manuscripts, statues, ancient books, early versions of the Quran, weapons, dresses, jewelry, Kalash effigies, inscriptions, paintings of the Mughal and later periods, household materials and pottery, as well as local and Persian handicrafts.

=== Gandhara and Greco-Buddhist Art ===
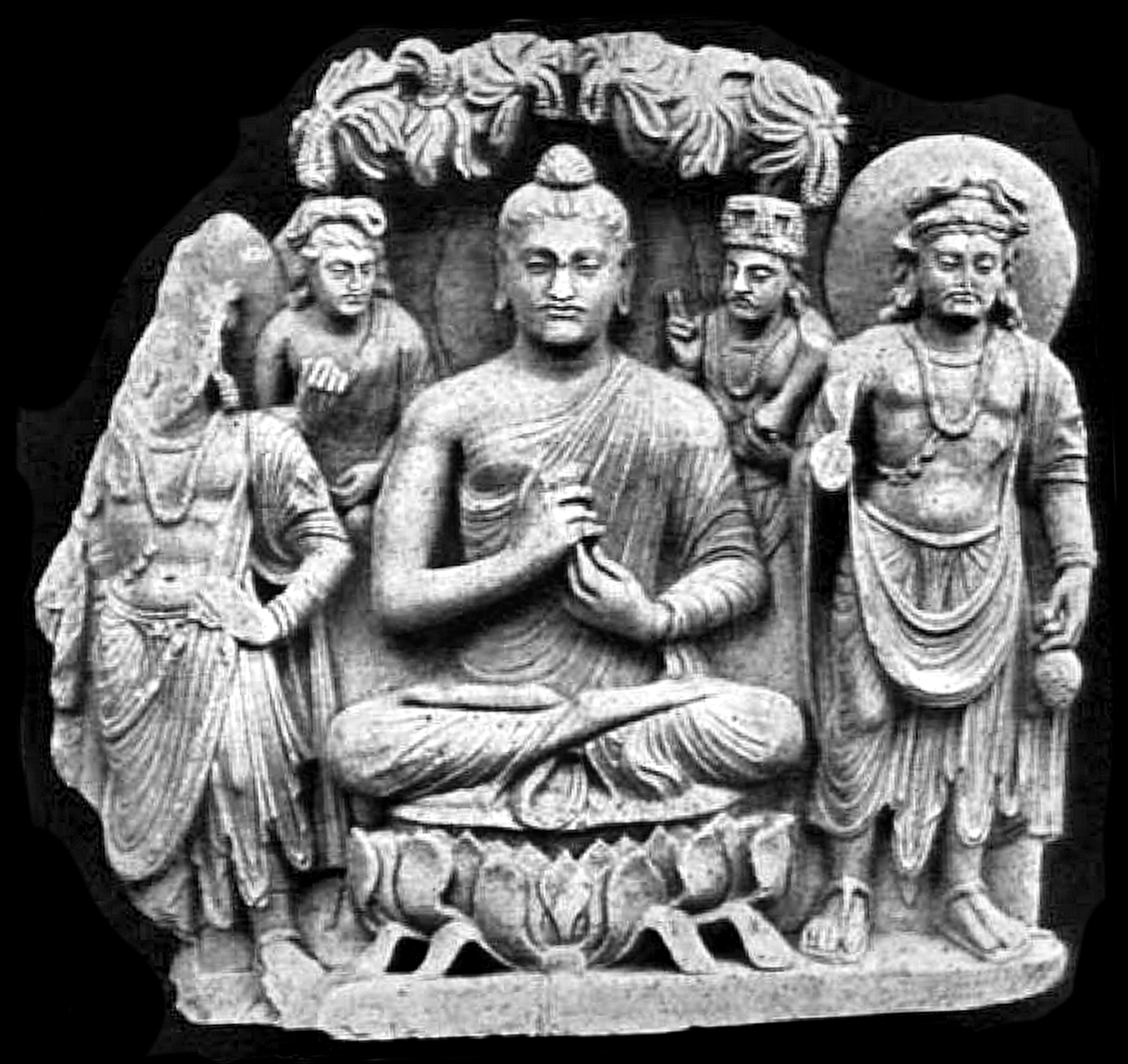
A Buddhist Triad from the Peshawar Museum, similar to the Brussels Buddha.

Peshawar Museum has extensive collections of Gandhara art of the Buddhist period, including Buddhist stone sculptures, terracotta figurines, and other Buddhist objects. The display of Gandhara art in the main hall includes Buddha's life stories, miracles, worship of symbols, relic caskets, and individual standing Buddha sculptures. The ethnological objects of that period are also exhibited in the museum.

=== Numismatics ===
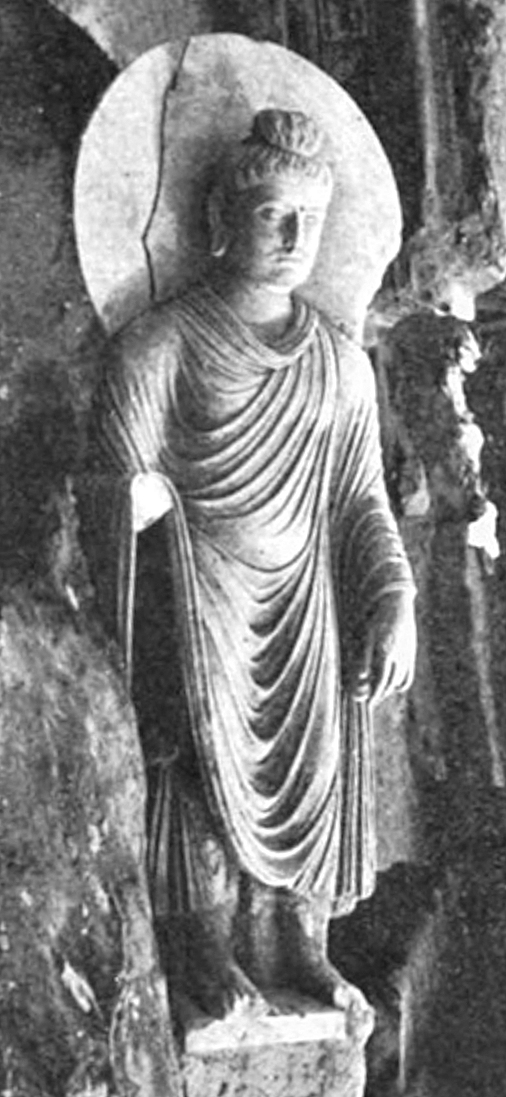
Great Buddha of Sahri Bahlol, 1909 excavation. Weight: 1.5 tons, about 3 meters tall. Peshawar Museum.

The Peshawar Museum has 8,625 coins, 4,510 of which are pre-Islamic. The main interest of the museum's numismatic collection is that the coins were recovered from archaeological sites, including: Shah-Ji-Ki-Dheri, Shari Bahlol, Takht-i-Bahi and Jamal Garhi. The collections of Bactrian Greek, Indo-Greek, Indo-Scythian, Indo-Parthian and Kushan coins have been published.

=== Mughal and Persian Islamic Art ===
This gallery exhibits wooden facades of mosques, ancient Arabic and Persian inscriptions, fine Multani tiles and ceramics, and the dresses and weapons of Syed Ahmad Barelvi and other historical leaders. The collection also includes Mughal Islamic metal artifacts in bronze and silver, along with calligraphic specimens and scrolls dating back as far as 1224.

=== Middle Age and British Rule to Present ===
This gallery showcases items reflecting on the culture and life of the tribes in Khyber Pakhtunkhwa province, including Kalasha Desh located in the far north of the province, home to a tribe of animists called the Kalash. The museum features cultural artifacts from the Kailash Valley, along with a collection of weaponry such as swords, daggers, spears, long bows, recurve bows, arrows, shields, muzzle-loading guns, revolvers, pistols and gunpowder boxes.

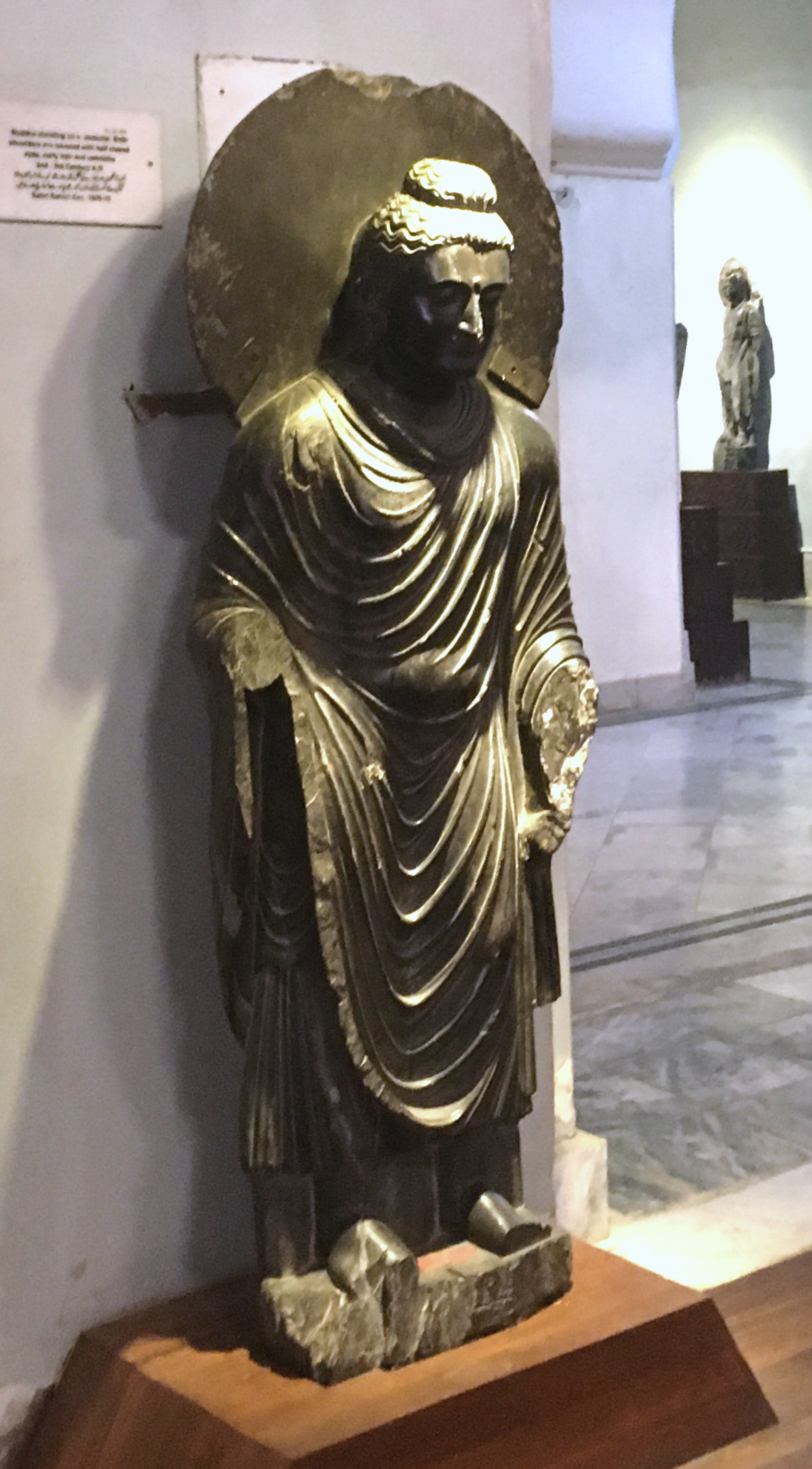
Standing Buddha

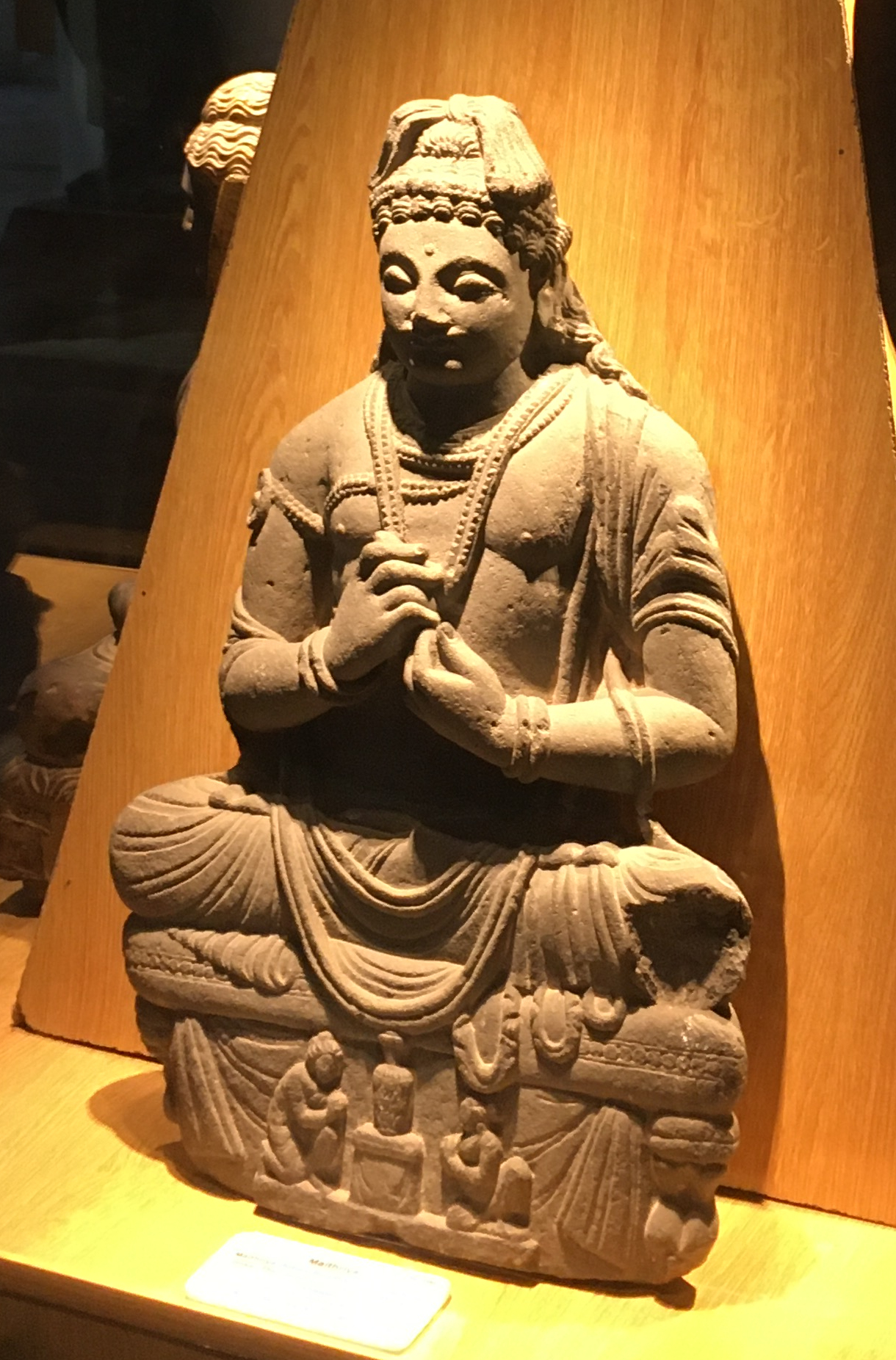
Seated Bodhisattva

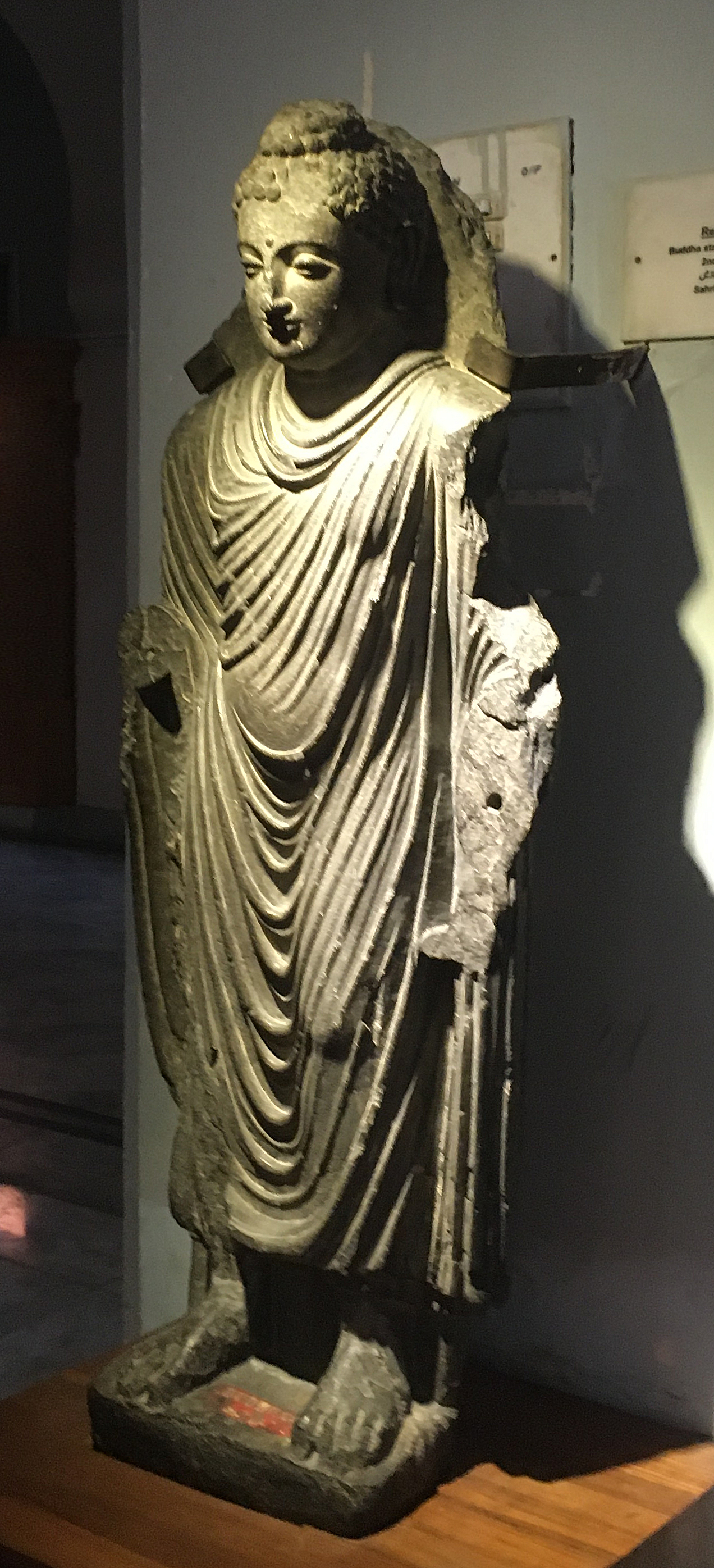
Sahri Bahlol Buddha, excavated 1909-1910

== See also ==
- Sethi Mohallah
- Governor's House (Peshawar)
- City Museum, Gorkhatri
- List of museums in Pakistan
