= Seri Bahlol =

Archaeological site in Pakistan

UNESCO World Heritage Site
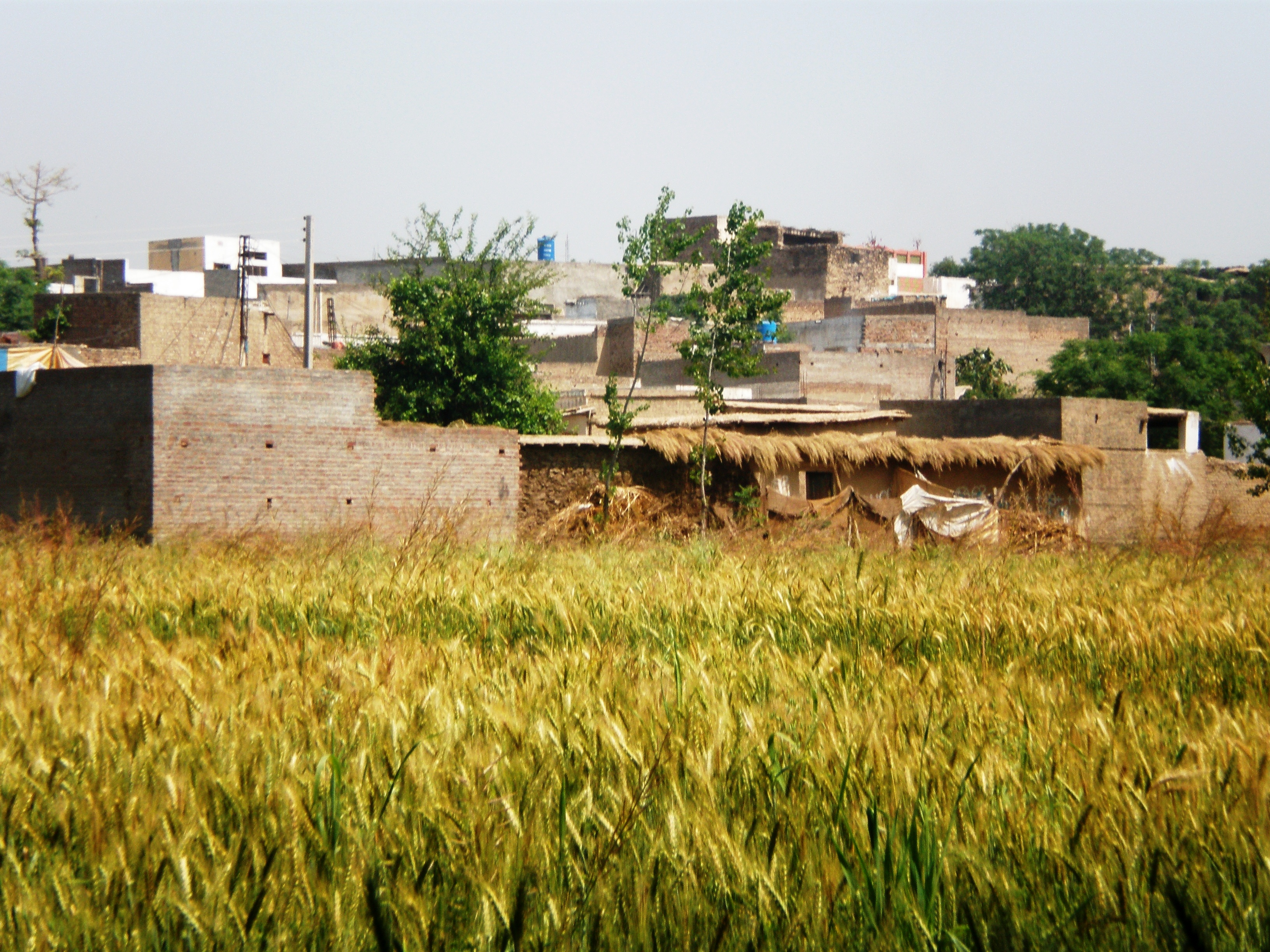

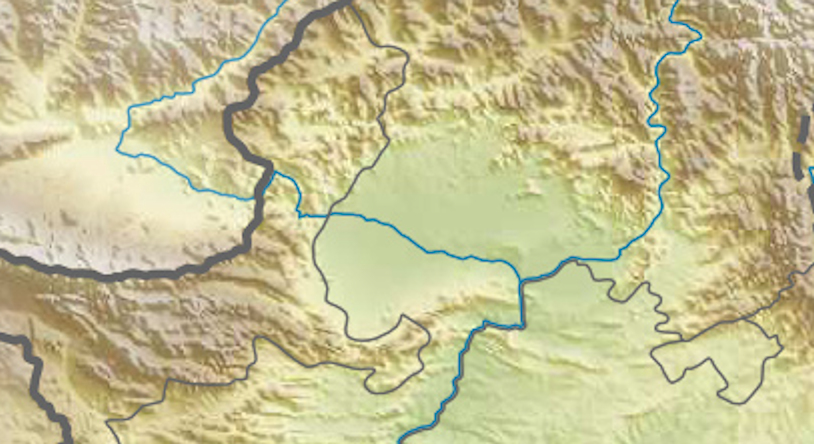
- Location within Pakistan Location within Gandhara Location within South Asia
- Location: Mardan District, Khyber Pakhtunkhwa, Pakistan,
- Part of: Buddhist Ruins of Takht-i-Bahi and Neighbouring City Remains at Seri Bahlol
- Criteria: Cultural: (iv)
- Reference: 140-002
- Inscription: 1980 (4th Session)
- Coordinates: 34°15′19.71″N 71°57′02.48″E

Seri Bahlol (Urdu: سری بہلول), also Sahr-i Bahlol or Sahri Bahlol, is a city and archaeological site located near Takht-i-Bahi, in Mardan District, about 70 kilometer north-west of Peshawar, Khyber Pakhtunkhwa, Pakistan.

== History ==
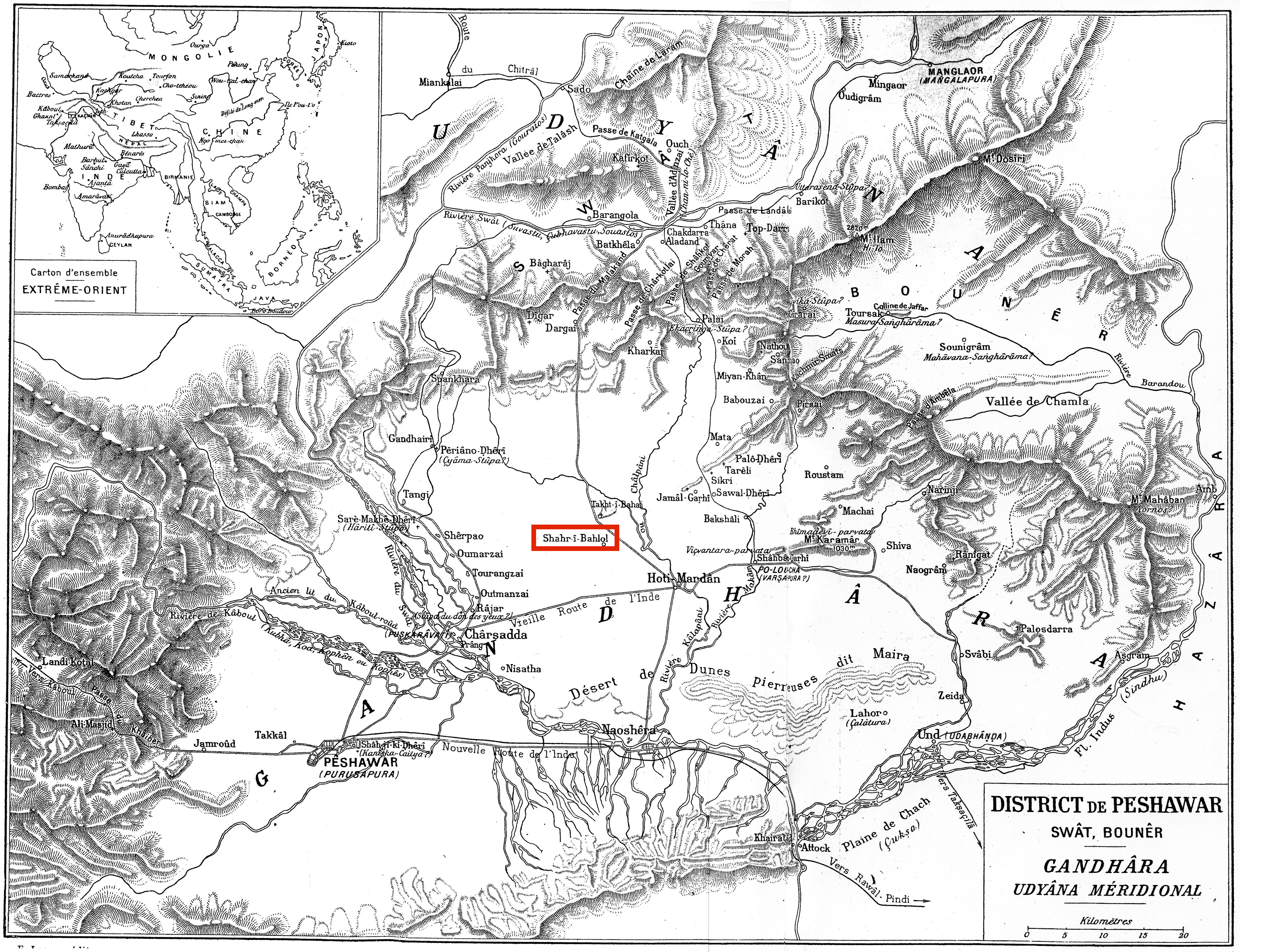
Seri Bahlol is at the center of the Gandhara area.

The meaning of the word "Seri Bahlol" .s uncertain The village is located on a hillock protected by a well sophisticated stone wall which was constructed under the Kushans. Seri Bahlol is a historical place and it has been included in the UNESCO World Heritage List since 1980. The ruins of Seri Bahlol are the remnants of a small ancient fortified town built during the Kushan period. The site was excavated during the time of John Marshall.

It contains the relics associated with Buddha, which have not been properly excavated. Antiques such as statues, coins, utensils and jewellery are commonly found. The archaeological site is threatened by illegal excavation rnd equires national and international attention in order to rpreserve he remnants at Seri Bahlol.

== Gallery ==
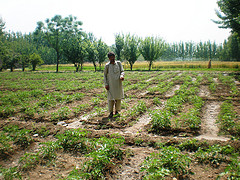
A farmer applying pesticides to his crop

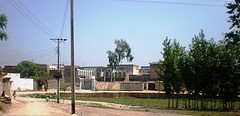
A view of the village

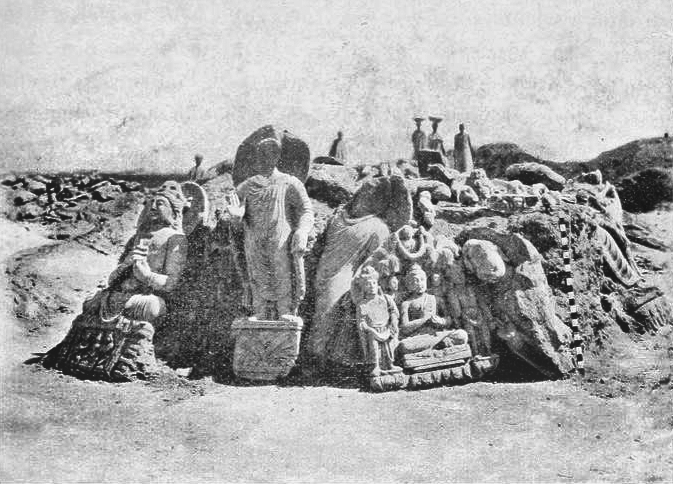
Excavations in 1911–1912.

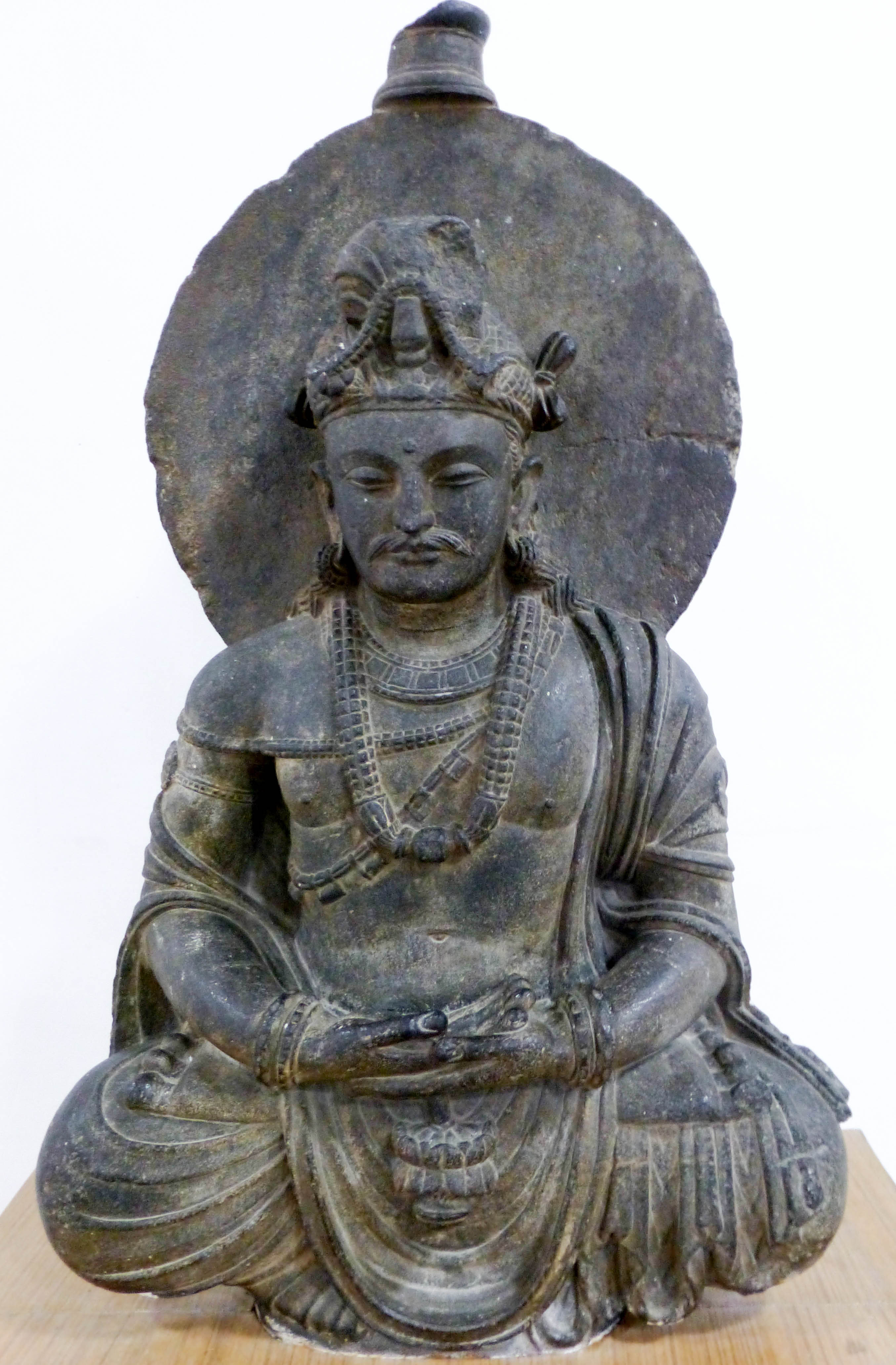
Meditating Bodhisattva. Schist. Sahr-i-Bahlol. Patna Museum

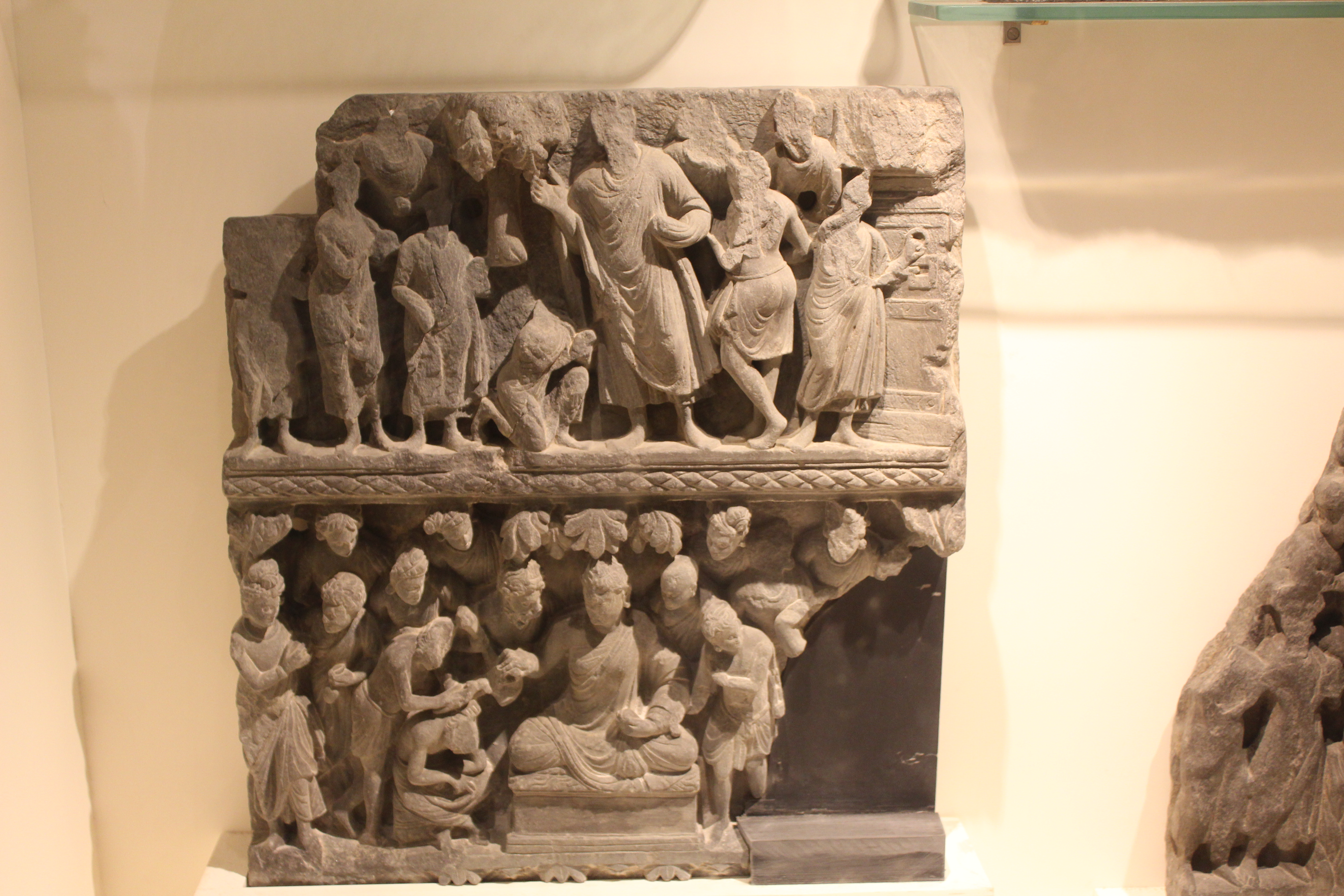
Ordination of Nanda. Schist. Sahr-i-Bahlol. Indian Museum, Calcutta.

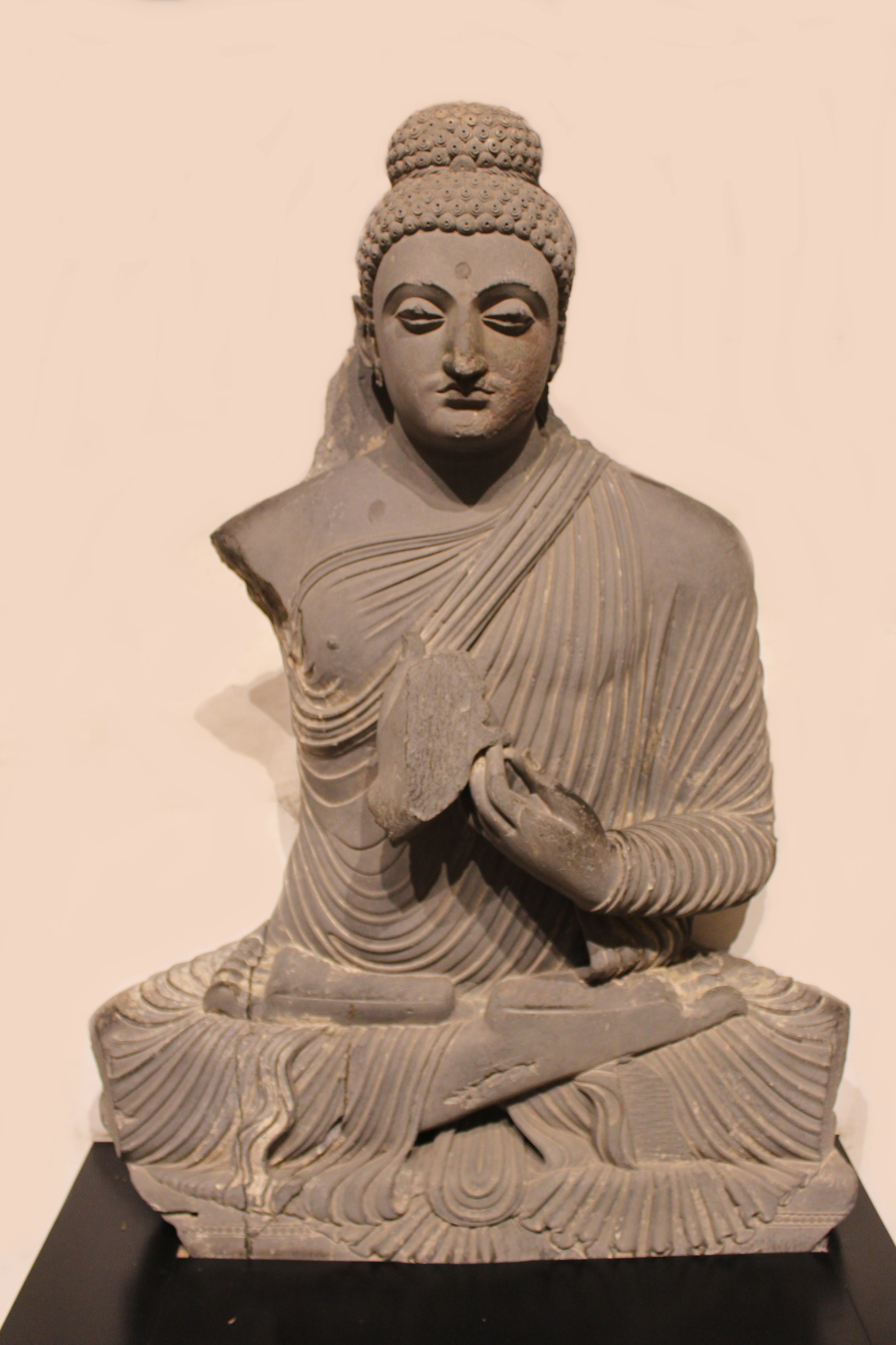
Preaching Buddha.

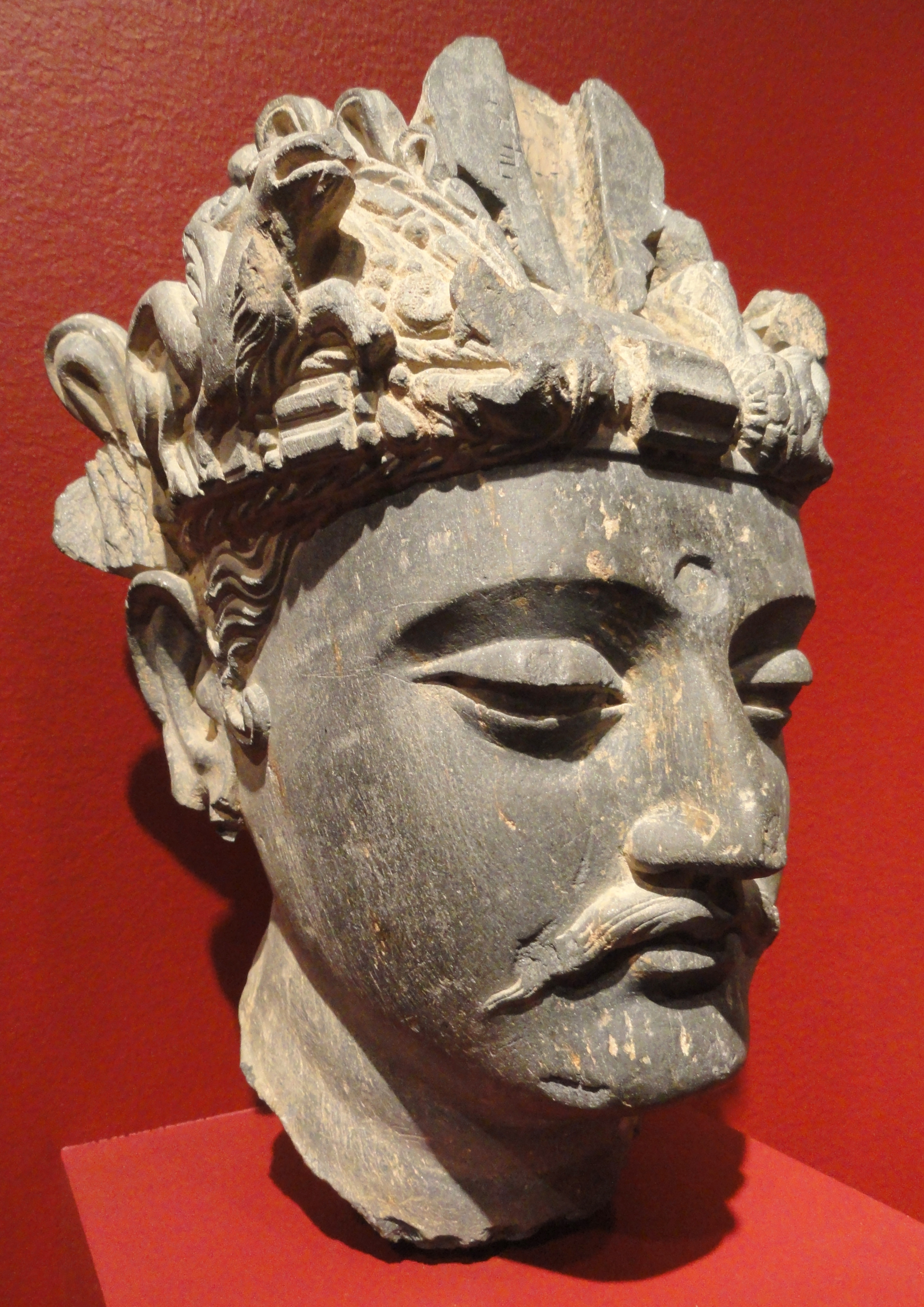
Head of a Bodhisattva.

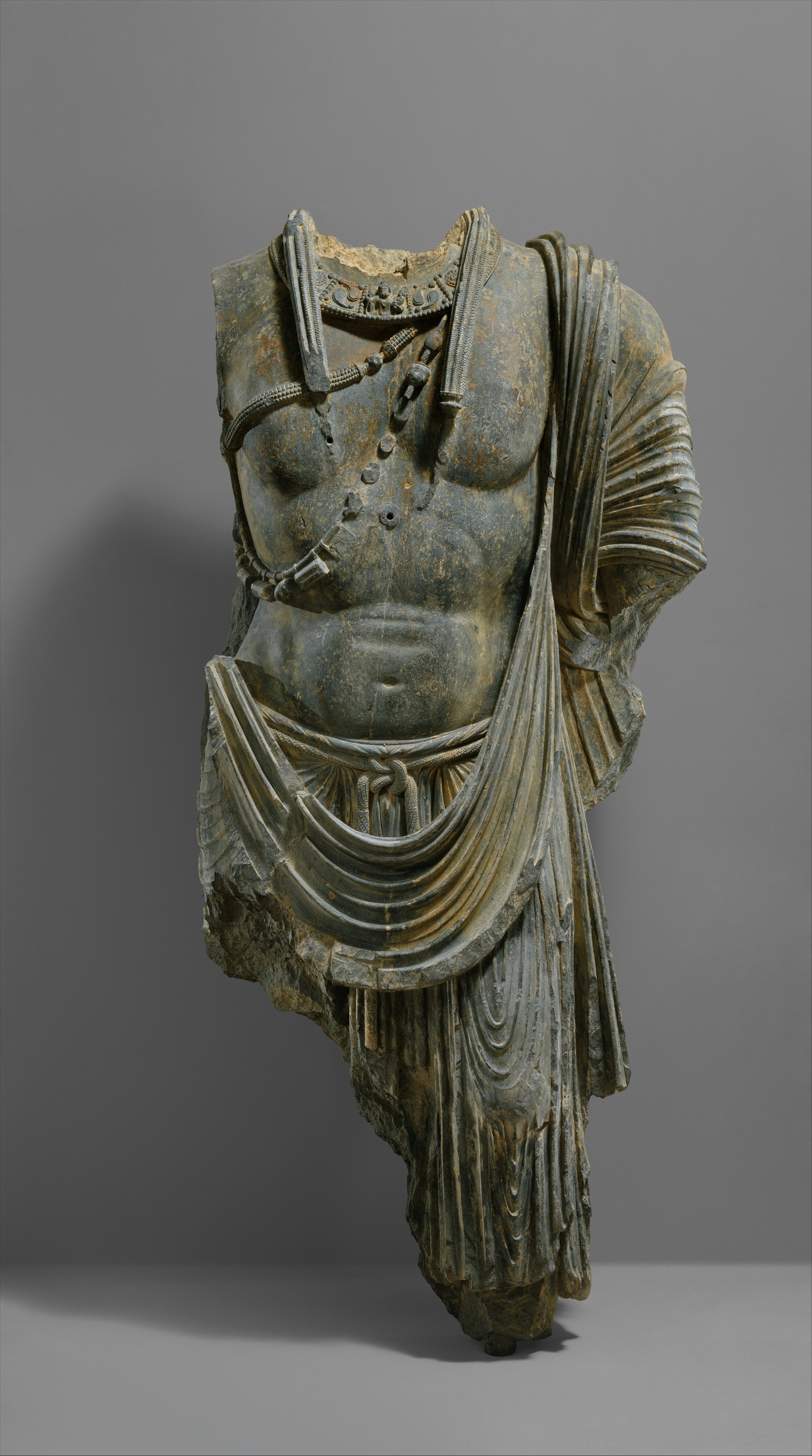
Bodhisattva.

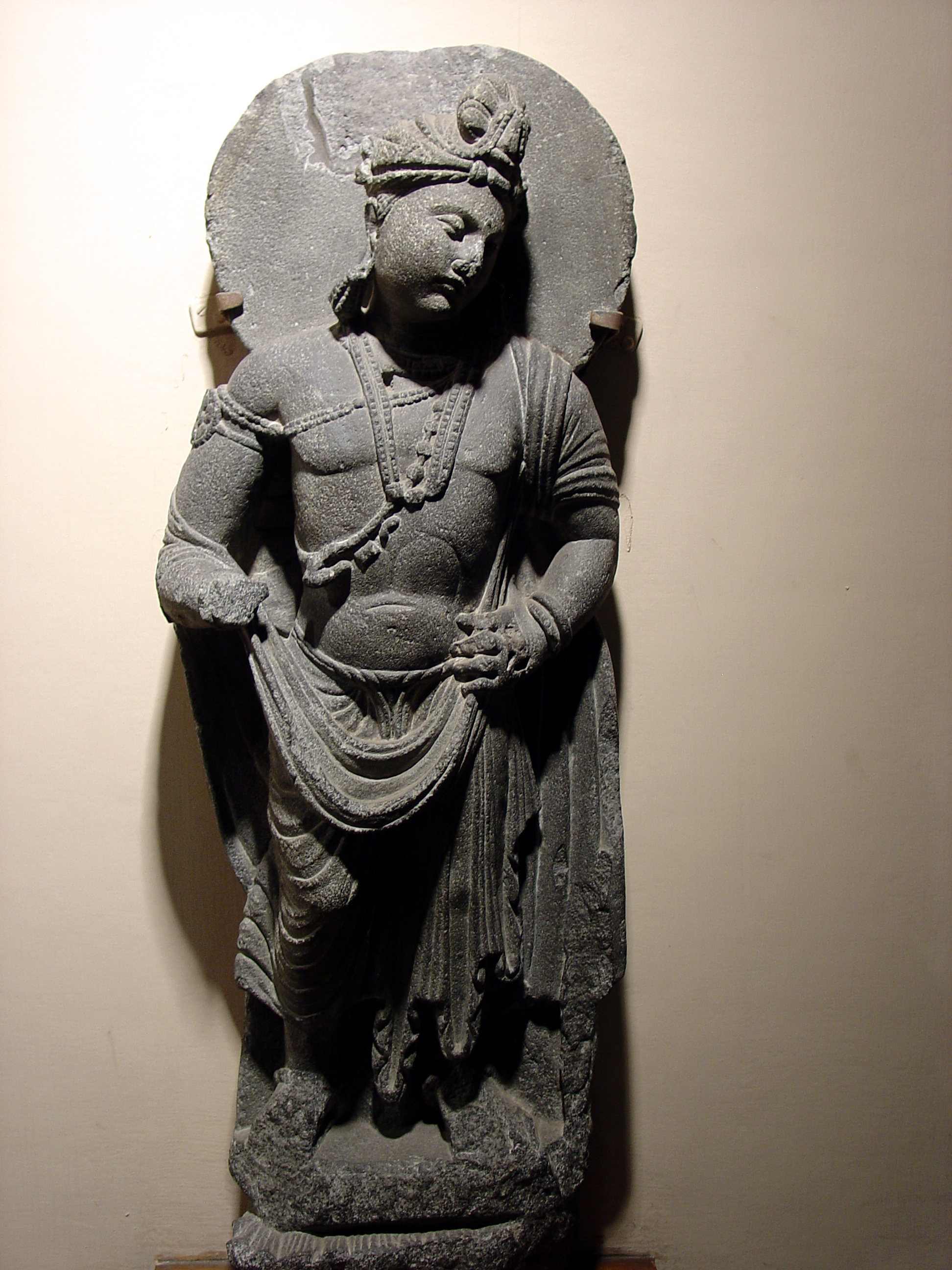
Standing Bodhisattva.

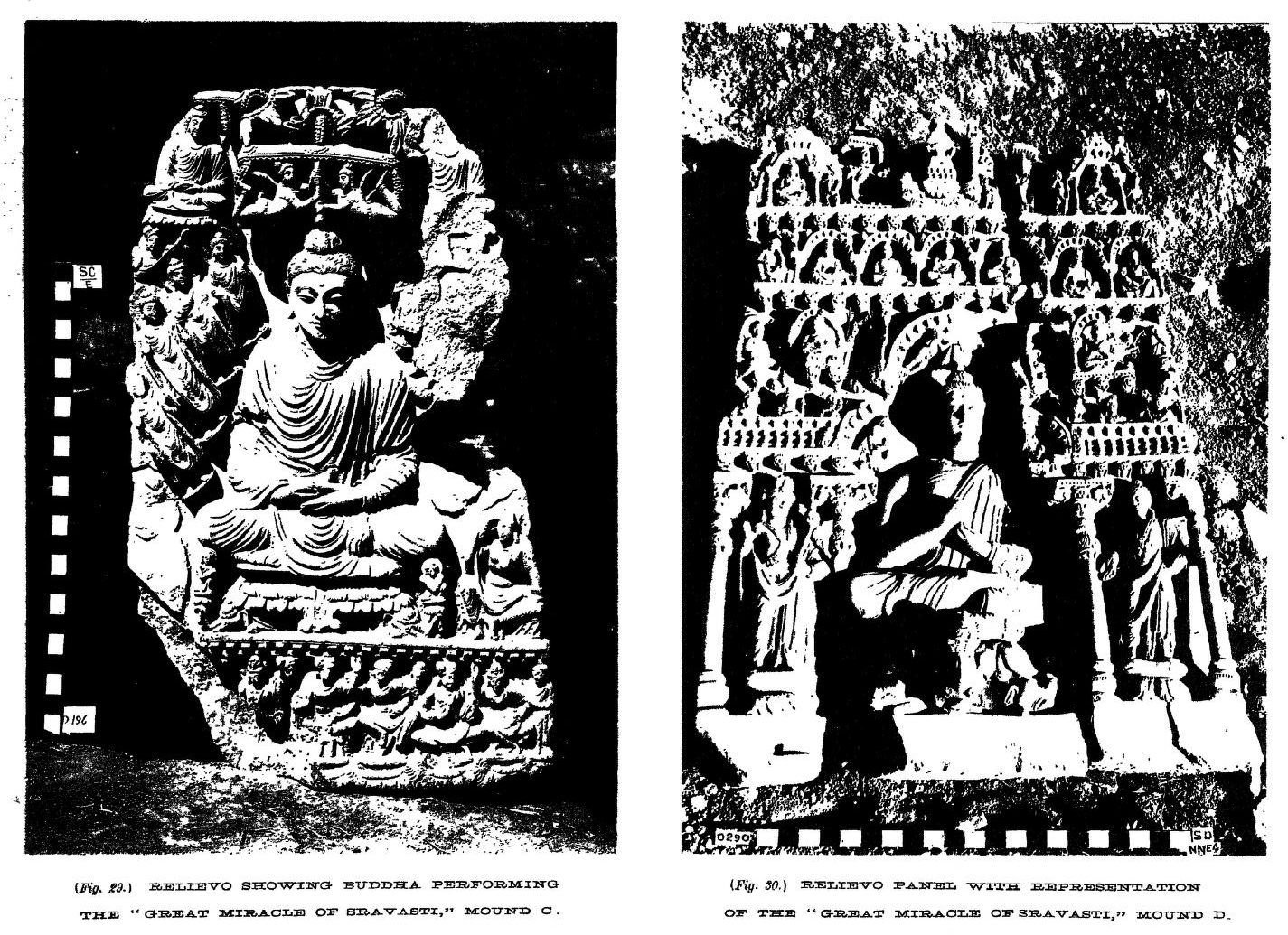
Buddha statues.

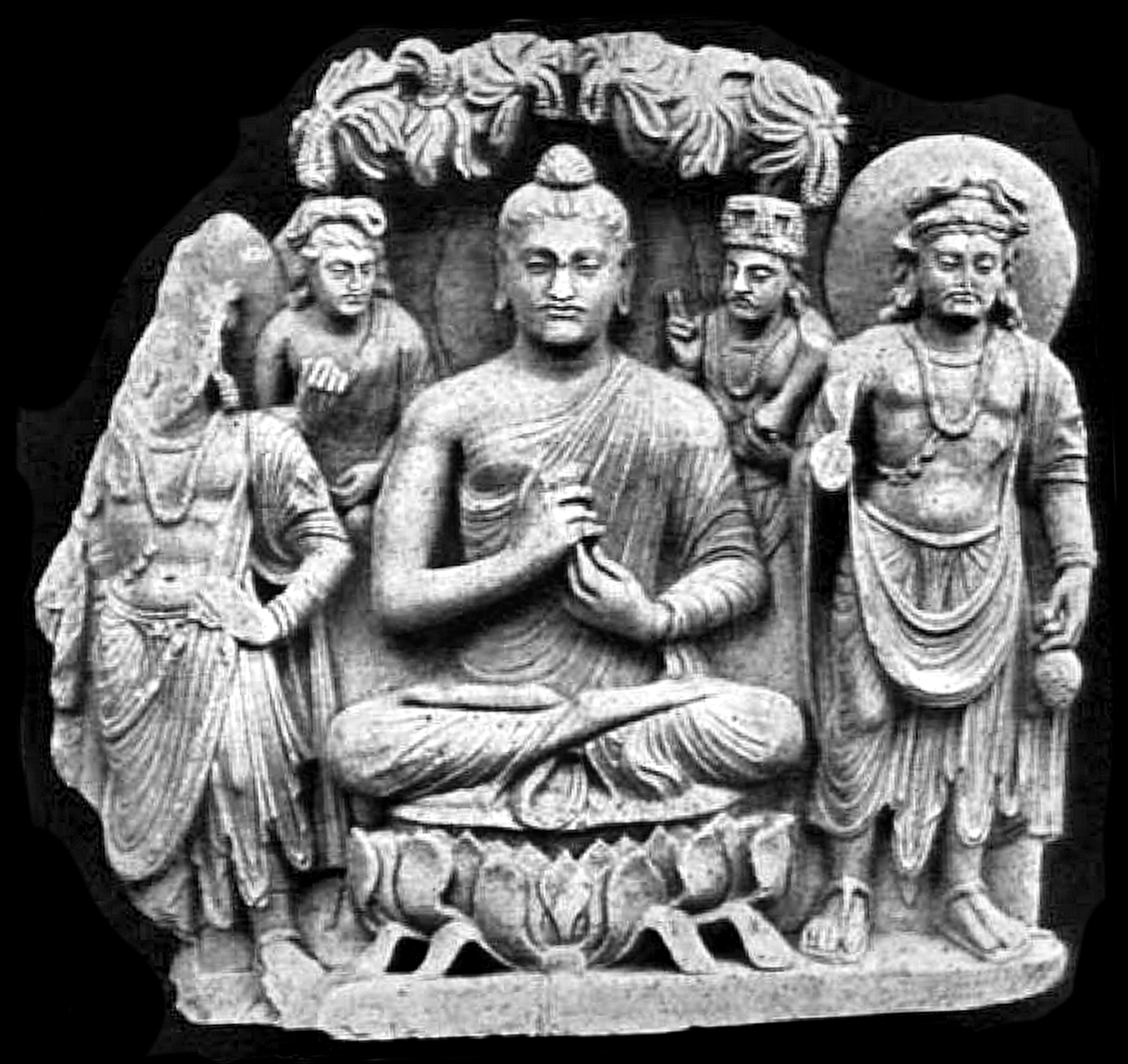
Seated Buddha triad from Sahr-i-Bahlol. Peshawar Museum.

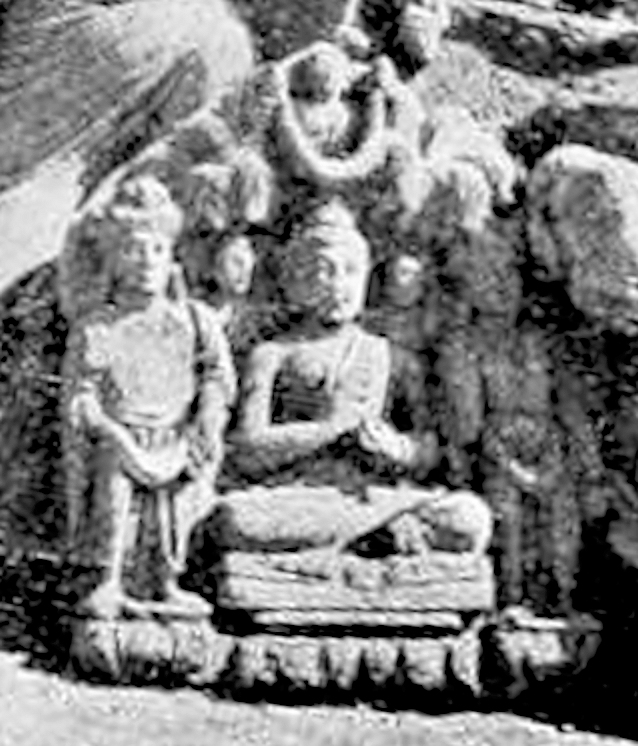
Seated Buddha triad, Sahri Bahlol excavations, 1911–1912.

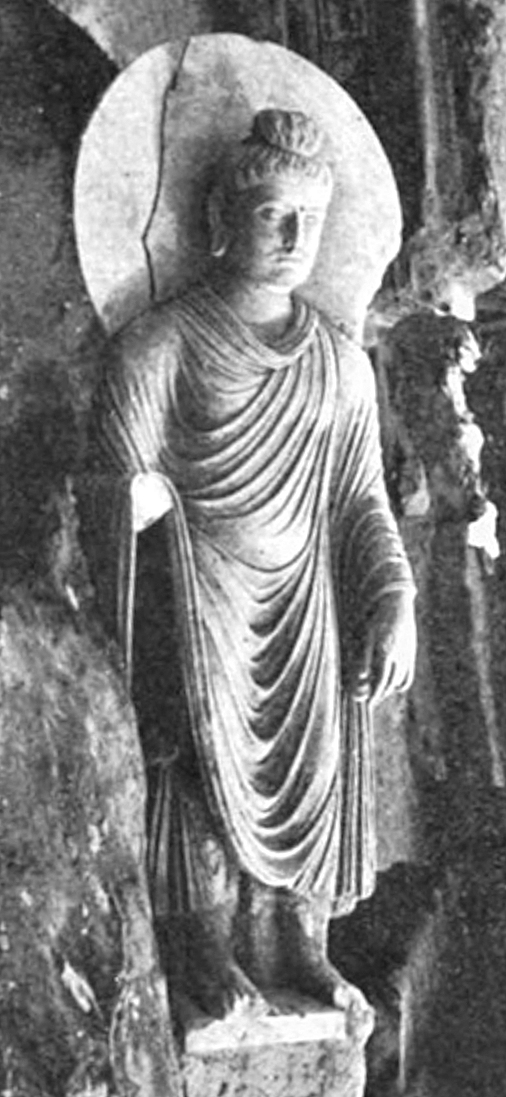
Great Buddha of Sahri Bahlol 1909 excavation (upright)

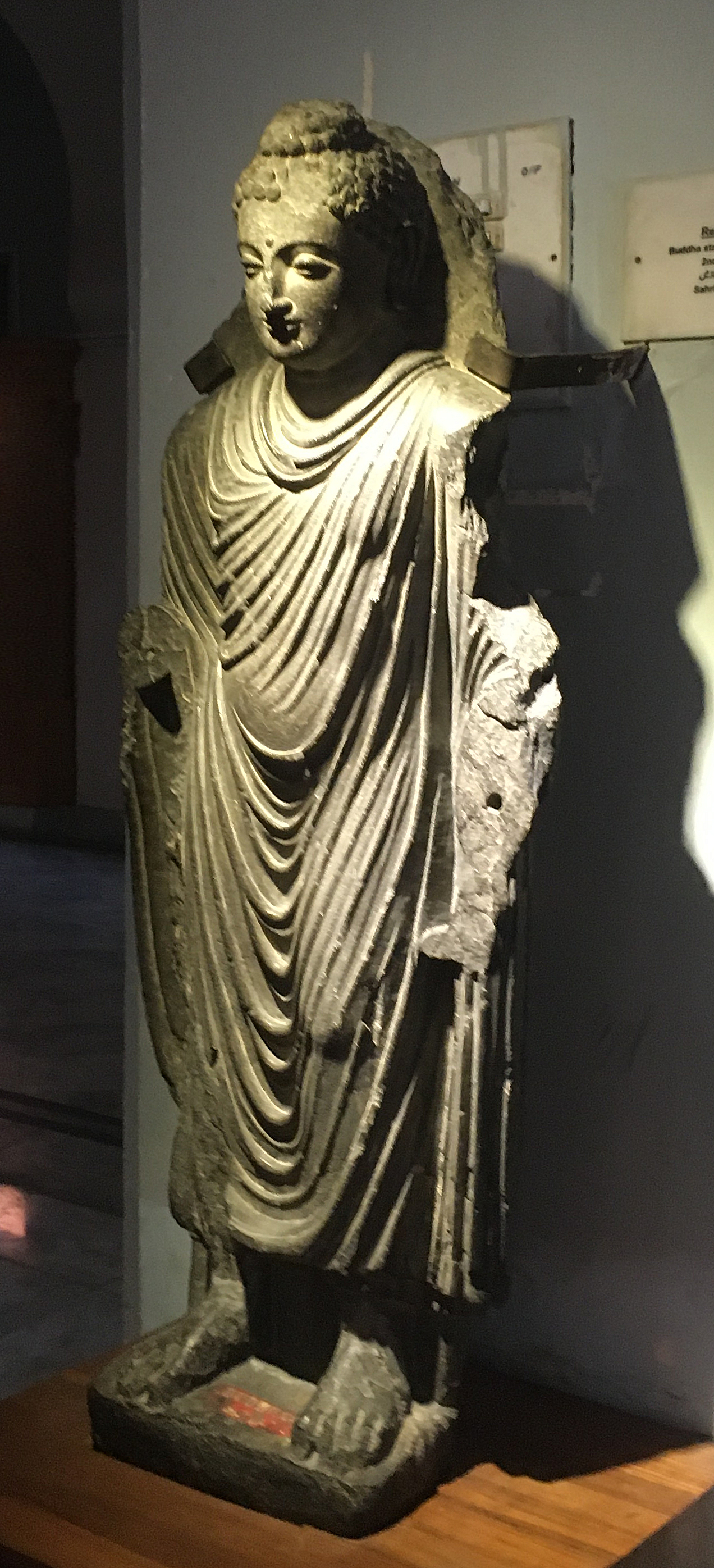
Sahri Bahlol Buddha, excavated 1909–1910, Peshawar Museum

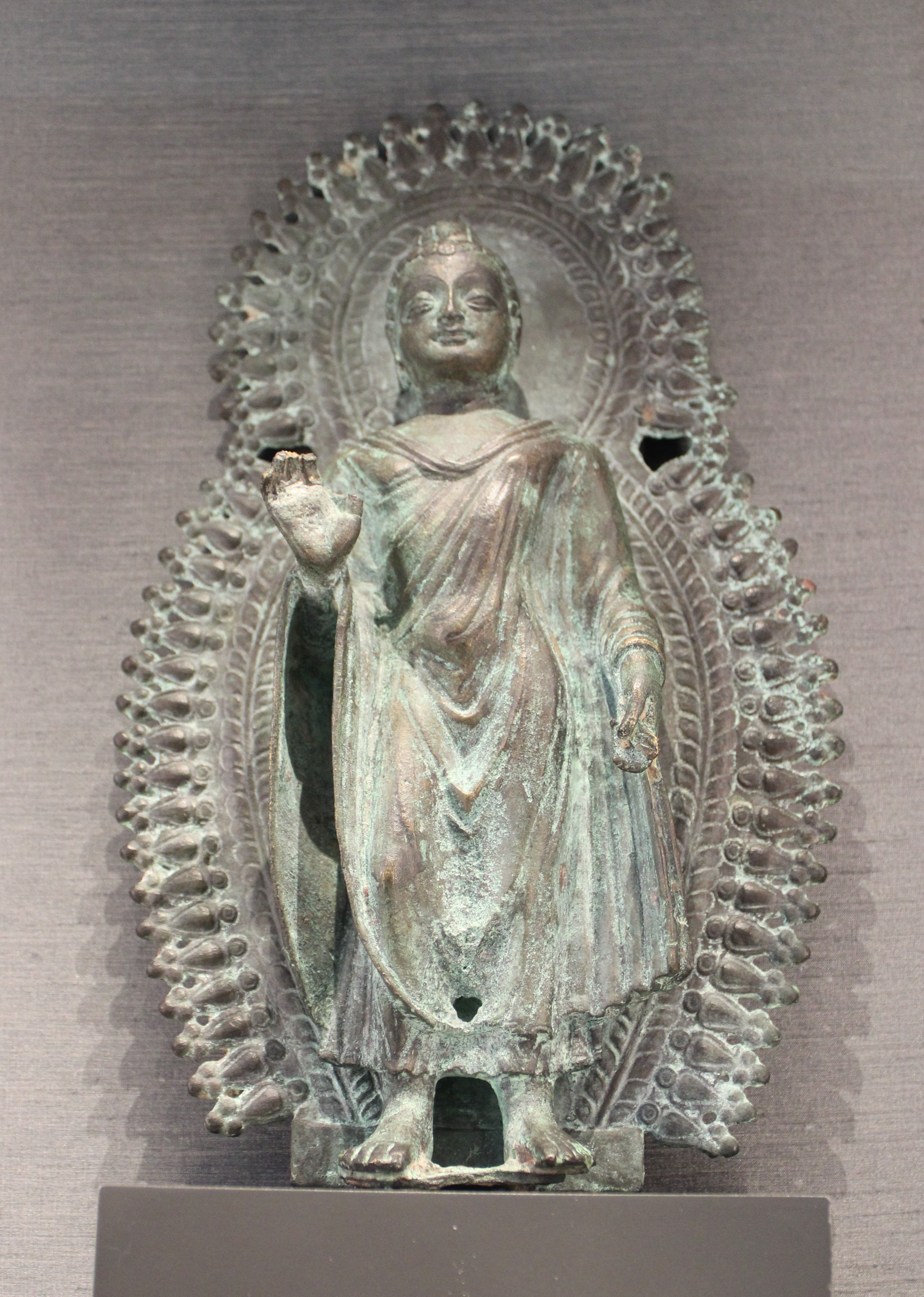
Bronze Buddha image, British Museum.

== See also ==
- Hindu, Jain and Buddhist architectural heritage of Pakistan
- List of UNESCO World Heritage Sites in Pakistan
