= Hephthalites =

5th–8th-century nomadic confederation in Central Asia

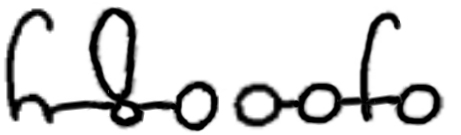
Hephthalites ηβοδαλο Ebodalo
- Empire: 440s–560 Principalities in Tokharistan and the Hindu-Kush until 710.
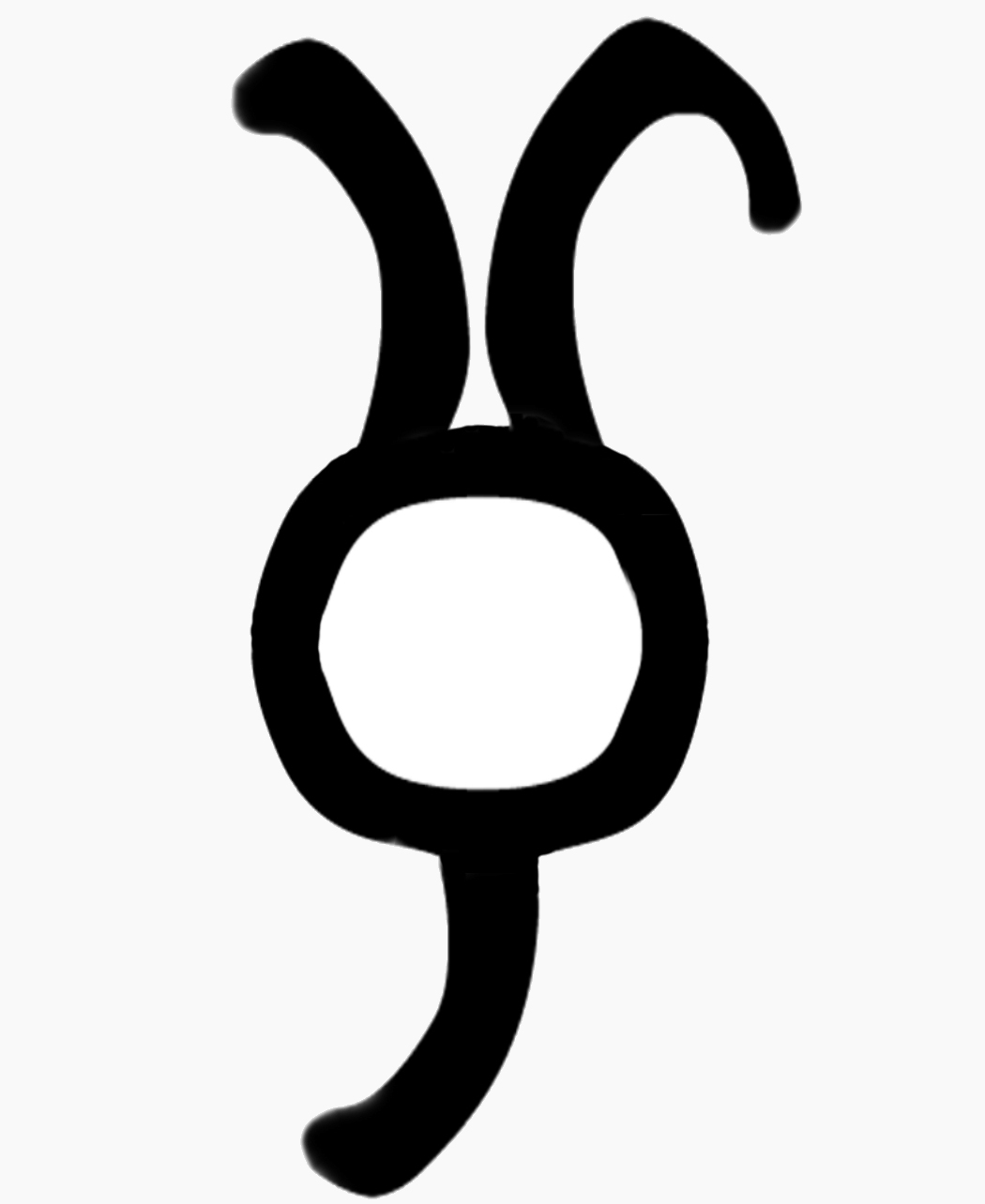
- Tamga of the Imperial Hephthalites, known as "Tamgha S2".

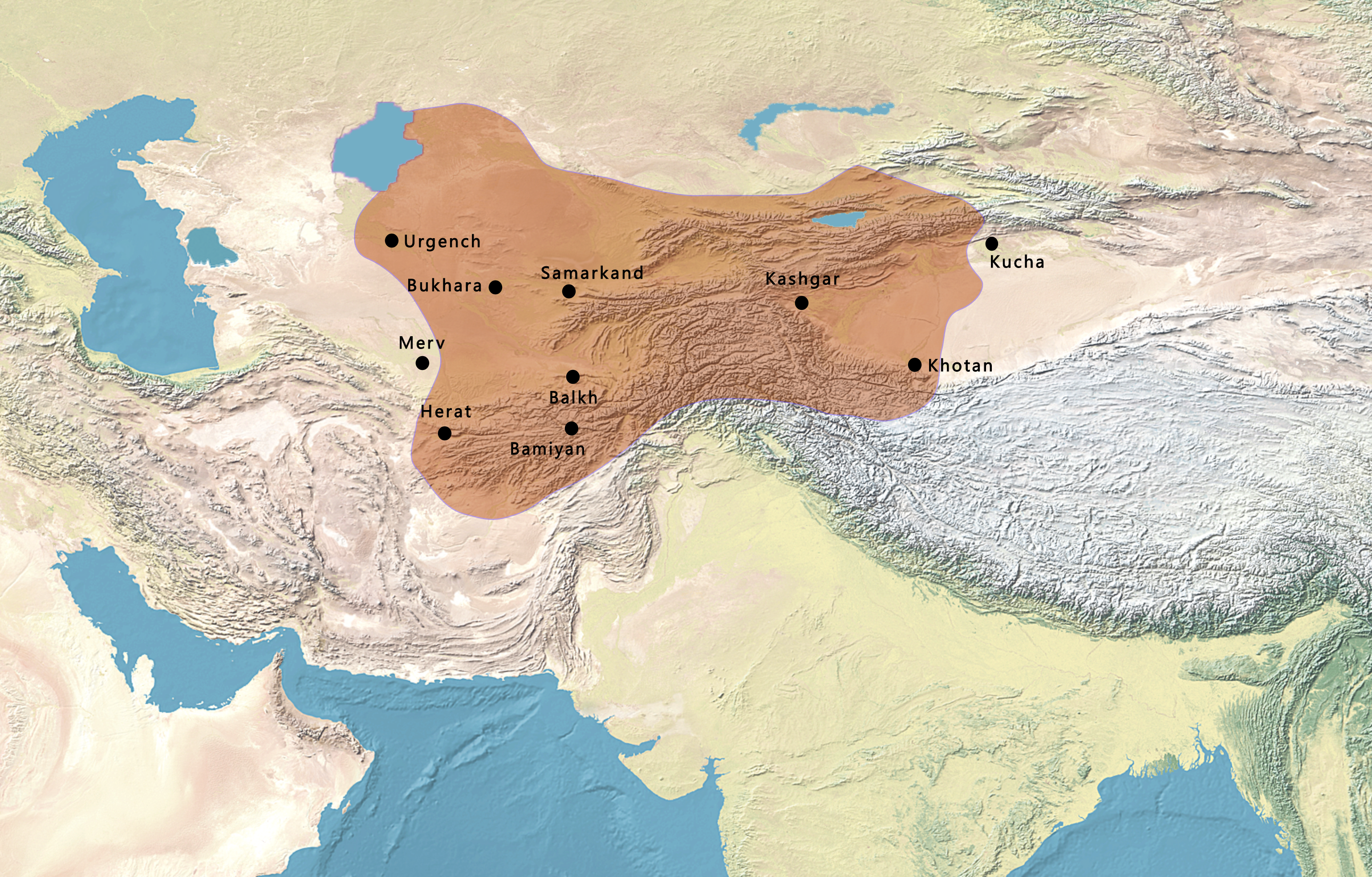
- Territory of the Hepthalite Empire, circa 500
- Status: Nomadic empire
- Capital: Kunduz (Walwalij, Drapsaka, or Badian); Balkh (Pakhlo)
- Common languages: Bactrian (official); Sogdian (Sogdiana); Turkic; Chorasmian; Prakrit
- Religion: Manichaeism; Zoroastrianism; Nestorian Christianity
- Historical era: Late antiquity
  - Established: Empire: 440s
  - Disestablished: 560; Principalities in Tokharistan and the Hindu-Kush until 710.
Preceded by
Kidarites
Sasanian Empire
Kangju
Alchon Huns
Succeeded by
Nezak Huns
First Turkic Khaganate
Sasanian Empire
Turk Shahis
Zunbils
Principality of Chaghaniyan

The Hephthalites or Ephthalites (Note: Ancient Greek: Ἐφθαλῖται, romanized: Ephthalîtai; Latin: Ephthalitae.) (Bactrian: ηβοδαλο, romanized: Ebodalo), sometimes called the White Huns (also known as the White Hunas, in Iranian as the Spet Xyon and in Sanskrit and Prakrit as the Sveta-huna), were a people who lived in Central Asia during the 5th to 8th centuries CE, and were a part of what numismatist Robert Göbl calls Iranian Huns. They formed an empire, the Imperial Hephthalites, and were militarily important from 450 CE, when they defeated the Kidarites, to 560 CE, when combined forces from the First Turkic Khaganate and the Sasanian Empire defeated them. After 560 CE, they established "principalities" in the area of Tokharistan, under the suzerainty of the Western Turks (in the areas north of the Oxus) and of the Sasanian Empire (in the areas south of the Oxus), before the Tokhara Yabghus took over in 625.

The Imperial Hephthalites, based in Bactria, expanded eastwards to the Tarim Basin, westwards to Sogdia and southwards through Afghanistan, but they never went beyond the Hindu-Kush, which was occupied by the Alchon Huns, previously thought to be an extension of the Hephthalites. They were a tribal confederation and included both nomadic and settled urban communities. They formed part of the four major states known collectively as Xyon (Xionites) or Huna, being preceded by the Kidarites and by the Alkhon, and succeeded by the Nezak Huns and by the First Turkic Khaganate. All of these Hunnic peoples have often been controversially linked to the Huns who invaded Eastern Europe during the same period, and/or have been referred to as "Huns", but scholars have reached no consensus about any such connection.

The stronghold of the Hephthalites was Tokharistan (present-day southern Uzbekistan and northern Afghanistan) on the northern slopes of the Hindu Kush, and their capital was probably at Kunduz, having come from the east, possibly from the area of Pamir. By 479 the Hephthalites had conquered Sogdia and driven the Kidarites eastwards, and by 493 they had captured parts of Dzungaria and the Tarim Basin (in present-day Northwest China). The Alchon Huns, formerly confused with the Hephthalites, expanded into Northern India as well.

The sources for Hephthalite history are sparse and the opinions of historians differ. There is no king-list, and historians are not sure how the group arose or what language they initially spoke. They seem to have called themselves Ebodalo (ηβοδαλο, hence Ephthal/Hephthal), often abbreviated Eb (ηβ), a name they wrote in the Bactrian script on some of their coins. The origin of the name "Hephthalites" is unknown, it may stem either from a Khotanese word *Hitala meaning "Strong", from hypothetical Sogdian *Heβtalīt, plural of *Heβtalak, or from postulated Middle Persian *haft āl "the Seven Al". (Note: de la Vaissière proposes underlying Turkic Yeti-Al, later translated to Iranian Haft-Al) (Note: de la Vaissière also cited Sims-Williams, who noted that the initial η- ē of the Bactrian form ηβοδαλο Ēbodālo precluded etymology based on Iranian haft and consequently hypothetical underlying Turkic yeti "seven")

== Name and ethnonyms ==
Hephthalite ruler The Hephthalites called themselves ēbodāl, as seen in this seal of an early Hephthalite king with the Bactrian script inscription: ηβοδαλο ββγο ēbodālo bbgo "Yabghu (Lord) of the Hephthalites" He wears an elaborate radiate crown, and royal ribbons. End 5th century- early 6th century CE.

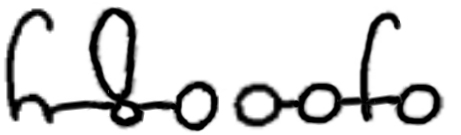
The Hephthalites called themselves ēbodālo (Bactrian: ^{}; Greek script: ηβοδαλο) in their inscriptions, which was commonly abbreviated to (ηβ, eb) in their coinage. An important and unique seal, held in the private collection of Professor Dr. Aman ur Rahman and published by Nicholas Sims-Williams in 2011, shows an early Hepthalite ruler with a round beardless face and slanted almond-shaped eyes, wearing a radiate crown with a single crescent, and framed by the Bactrian script legend ηβοδαλο ββγο ("The Lord [Yabghu] of the Hephthalites"). (Note: Similar crowns are known in other seals such as the seal of "Kedīr, the hazāruxt" ("Kedir the Chiliarch"), dated by Sims-Williams to the last quarter of the 5th century CE from the paleography of the inscription. Reference for the exact datation: Sundermann, Hintze & de Blois (2009), p. 218, note 14) The seal is dated to the end 5th century- early 6th century CE. The ethnic name "Ebodalo", and title "Ebodalo Yabghu", have also been discovered in contemporary Bactrian documents of the Kingdom of Rob describing administrative functions under the Hephthalites.

Byzantine Greek sources referred to them as Ephthalîtai (Ἐφθαλῖται), Abdel or Avdel. To the Armenians, the Hephthalites were Hephthal, Hep't'al & Tetal and sometimes identified with the Kushans. To the Persians, Hephthalites are Hephtal, Hephtel, & Hēvtāls. To Arabs, Hephthalites were Haital, Hetal, Heithal, Haiethal, Heyâthelites, (al-)Hayaṭila (هياطلة), and sometimes identified as Turks. According to Zeki Velidi Togan (1985), the form Haytal in Persian and Arabic sources in the first period was a clerical error for Habtal, as Arabic ـبـ resembles ـيـ.

In Chinese chronicles, the Hephthalites are called Yàndàiyílìtuó (Chinese: 厭帶夷栗陀), or in the more usual abbreviated form, Yèdā 嚈噠 or in the 635 Book of Liang as the Huá 滑. The latter name has been given various Latinisations, including Yeda, Ye-ta, Ye-tha; Ye-dā and Yanda. The corresponding Cantonese and Korean names Yipdaat and Yeoptal (Korean: 엽달), which preserve aspects of the Middle Chinese pronunciation (IPA [ʔjɛpdɑt]) better than the modern Mandarin pronunciation, are more consistent with the Greek Hephthalite. Some Chinese chroniclers suggest that the root Hephtha- (as in Yàndàiyílìtuó or Yèdā) was technically a title equivalent to "emperor", while Huá was the name of the dominant tribe.

In ancient India, names such as Hephthalite were unknown. The Hephthalites were part of, or offshoots of, people known in India as Hunas or Turushkas, although these names may have referred to broader groups or neighbouring peoples. Ancient Sanskrit text Pravishyasutra mentions a group of people named Havitaras but it is unclear whether the term denotes Hephthalites. The Indians also used the expression "White Huns" (Sveta Huna) for the Hephthalites.

=== Geographical origin and expansion ===
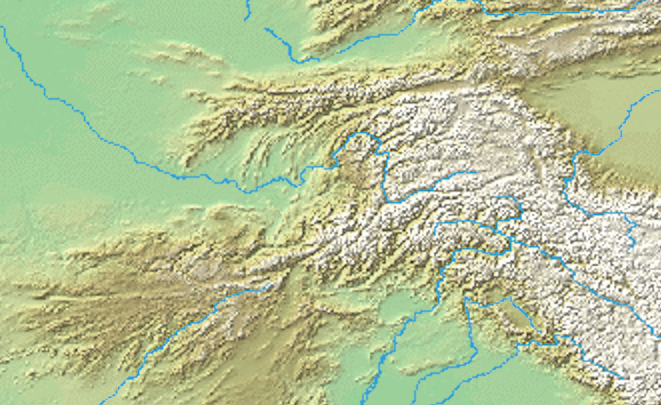
The Hephthalites came from Badakhshan or the Altai, and always had their historical stronghold in Bactria (Tokharistan), with their capital in Kunduz.

According to recent scholarship, the stronghold of the Hephthalites was always Tokharistan on the northern slopes of the Hindu Kush, in what is present-day southern Uzbekistan and northern Afghanistan. Their capital was probably at Kunduz, which was known to the 11th-century scholar al-Biruni as War-Walīz, a possible origin of one of the names given by the Chinese to Hephthalites: 滑 (Middle Chinese (ZS) *ɦˠuat̚ > standard Chinese: Huá).

The Hephthalites may have come from the East, through the Pamir Mountains, possibly from the area of Badakhshan. Alternatively, they may have migrated from the Altai region, among the waves of invading Huns.

Following their westward or southward expansion, the Hephthalites settled in Bactria, and displaced the Alchon Huns, who expanded into Northern India. The Hephthalites came into contact with the Sasanian Empire, and were involved in helping militarily Peroz I seize the throne from his brother Hormizd III.

Later, in the late 5th century, the Hephthalites expanded into vast areas of Central Asia, and occupied the Tarim Basin as far as Turfan, taking control of the area from the Rourans, who had been collecting heavy tribute from the oasis cities, but were now weakening under the assaults of the Chinese Northern Wei dynasty.

== Origins and characteristics ==
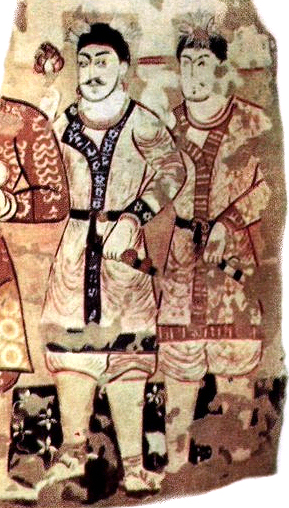
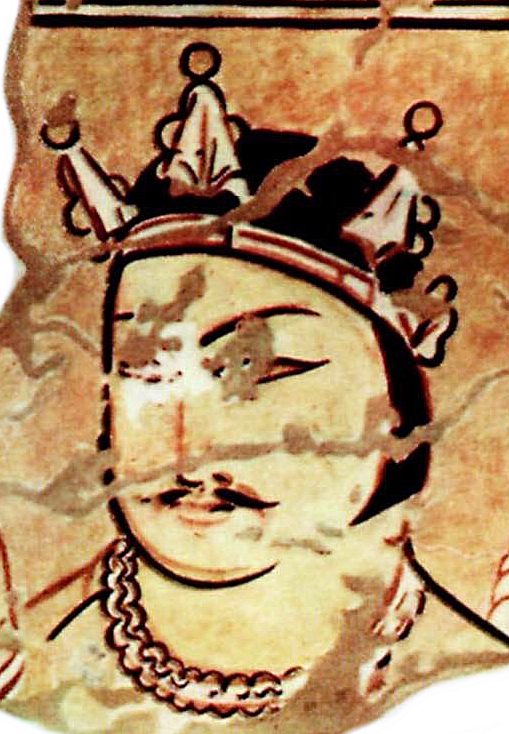
Murals from Dilberjin Tepe, thought to represent early Hephthalites. The ruler wears a radiate crown which is comparable to the crown of the king on the "Yabghu of the Hephthalites" seal.

There are several theories regarding the origins of the Hephthalites, with the Iranic and Altaic theories being the main ones. The most prominent theory at present seems to be that the Hephthalites were of Turkic origin, and later adopted the Bactrian language.

According to most specialists, the Hephthalites adopted Bactrian as their official language, just as the Kushans had done, following their settlement in Bactria/Tokharistan. Bactrian was an Eastern Iranian language which was written in the Greek alphabet, a legacy of the Greco-Bactrian kingdom in the 3rd–2nd century BCE. Bactrian, beyond being an official language, was also the language of the local populations ruled by the Hephthalites.

The Hephthalites inscribed their coins in Bactrian. The titles they held were Bactrian, such as χοαδηο (khoadēo) or šao, and of probable Chinese origin, such as yabghu. The names of Hephthalite rulers given in Ferdowsi's Shahnameh are Iranian, and gem inscriptions and other evidence shows that the official language of the Hephthalite elite was East Iranian. In 1959, Kazuo Enoki proposed that the Hephthalites were probably (East) Iranians who originated in Bactria/Tokharistan, based on the fact that ancient sources generally located them in the area between Sogdia and the Hindu-Kush, and the Hephthalites had some Iranian characteristics. Richard Nelson Frye cautiously accepted Enoki's hypothesis, while at the same time stressing that the Hephthalites "were probably a mixed horde". Frye writes:

Just as later nomadic empires were confederations of many peoples, we may tentatively propose that the ruling groups of these invaders were, or at least included, Turkic-speaking tribesmen from the east and north, although most probably the bulk of the people in the confederation of Chionites and then Hephhtalites spoke an Iranian language. In this case, as normal, the nomads adopted the written language, institutions, and culture of the settled folks.

A few scholars, such as Marquart and Grousset proposed Proto-Mongolic origins. Yu Taishan traced the Hephthalites' origins to the Xianbei and further to Goguryeo.

Other scholars such as de la Vaissière, based on a recent reappraisal of the Chinese sources, suggest that the Hephthalites were of Turkic origin, and later adopted the Bactrian language, first for administrative purposes, and possibly later as a native language. According to Rezakhani (2017), this thesis is seemingly the "most prominent at present". (Note: de la Vaissière (2012) pointed out that "[a] recently published seal gives the title of a fifth-century lord of Samarkand as 'king of the Oglar Huns.'" (βαγο ογλαρ(γ)ο – υονανο). See the seal and this reading of the inscription in Hans Bakker (2020: 13, note 17), referencing from Sim-Williams (2011: 72-74). "Oglar" is thought to derive from the Turk oǧul-lar > oǧlar "sons; princes" plus an Iranian adjective suffix -g. Alternatively, and less likely, "Oglarg" could correspond to "Walkon", and thus the Alchon Huns, although the seal is closer to Kidarites coin types. Another seal found in the Kashmir reads "ολαρ(γ)ο" (seal AA2.3). The Kashmir seal was published by Grenet, ur Rahman, and Sims-Williams (2006:125-127) who compared ολαργο Ularg on the seal to the ethnonym οιλαργανο "people of Wilarg" attested in a Bactrian document written in 629 CE. The style of the sealings is related to the Kidarites, and the title "Kushanshah" is known to have disappeared with the Kidarites.)

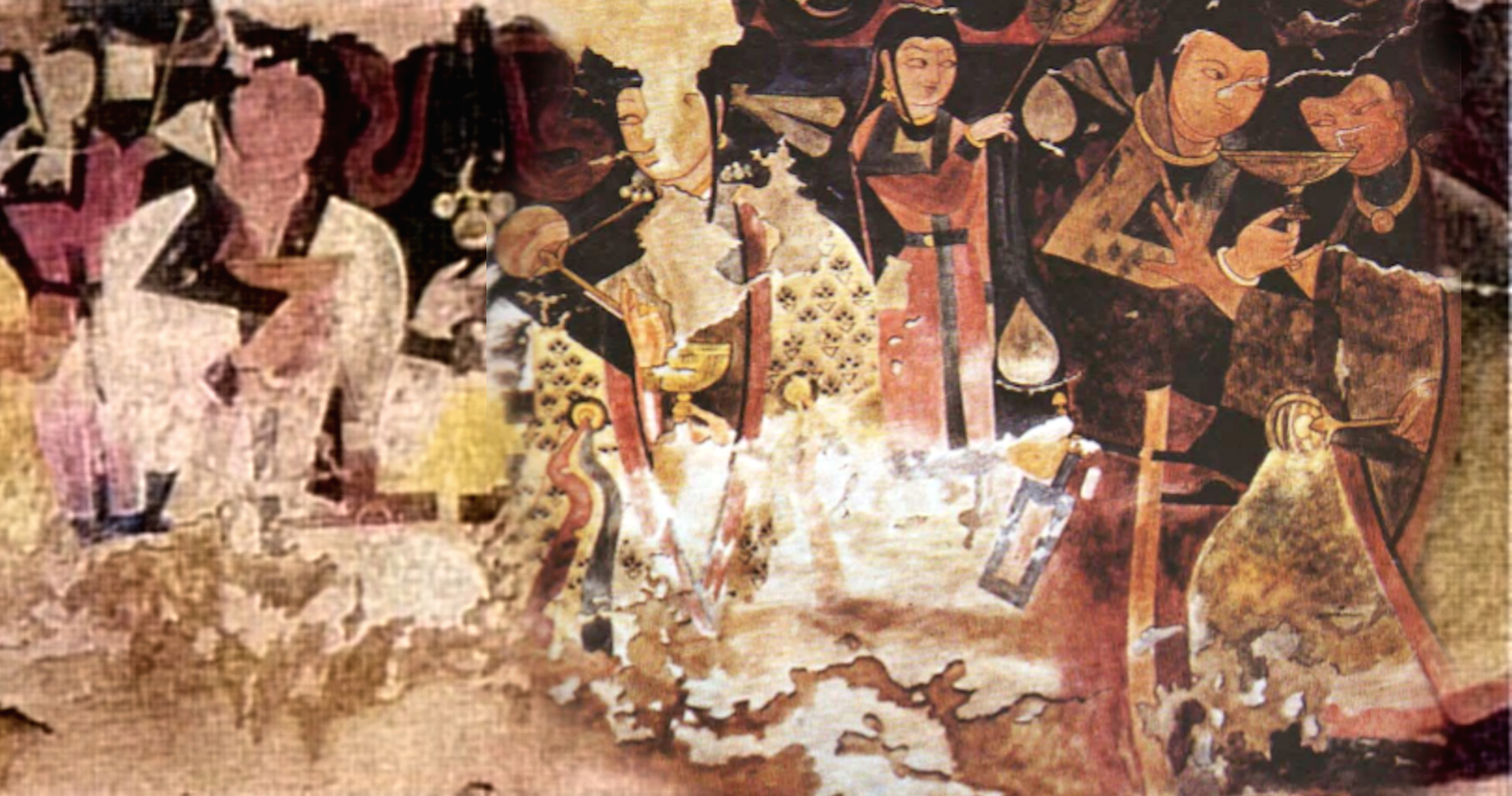
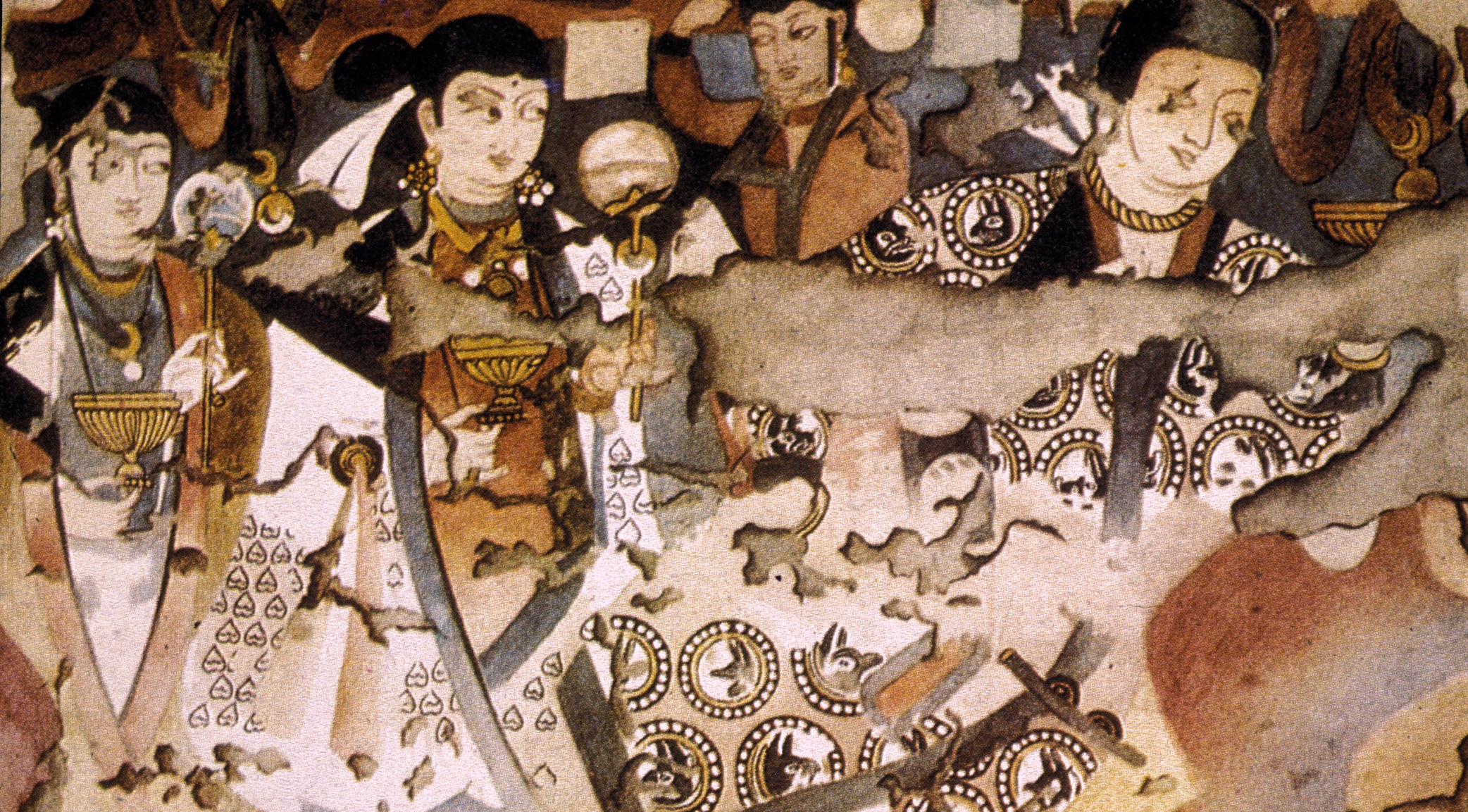
The banquet scenes in the murals of Balalyk Tepe show the life of the Hephthalite ruling class of Tokharistan.

=== Relation to European Huns ===
According to Martin Schottky, the Hephthalites apparently had no direct connection with the European Huns, but may have been causally related with their movement. The tribes in question deliberately called themselves "Huns" in order to frighten their enemies. On the contrary, de la Vaissière considers that the Hephthalites were part of the great Hunnic migrations of the 4th century CE from the Altai region that also reached Europe, and that these Huns "were the political, and partly cultural, heirs of the Xiongnu". This massive migration was apparently triggered by climate change, with aridity affecting the mountain grazing grounds of the Altay Mountains during the 4th century CE. According to Amanda Lomazoff and Aaron Ralby, there is a high synchronicity between the "reign of terror" of Attila in the west and the southern expansion of the Hephthalites, with extensive territorial overlap between the Huns and the Hephthalites in Central Asia.

The 6th-century Byzantine historian Procopius of Caesarea (History of the Wars, Book I. ch. 3), related them to the Huns in Europe, but insisted on cultural and sociological differences, highlighting the sophistication of the Hephthalites:

The Ephthalitae Huns, who are called White Huns [...] The Ephthalitae are of the stock of the Huns in fact as well as in name, however, they do not mingle with any of the Huns known to us, for they occupy a land neither adjoining nor even very near to them; but their territory lies immediately to the north of Persia [...] They are not nomads like the other Hunnic peoples, but for a long period have been established in a goodly land... They are the only ones among the Huns who have white bodies and countenances which are not ugly. It is also true that their manner of living is unlike that of their kinsmen, nor do they live a savage life as they do; but they are ruled by one king, and since they possess a lawful constitution, they observe right and justice in their dealings both with one another and with their neighbors, in no degree less than the Romans and the Persians

=== Chinese chronicles ===
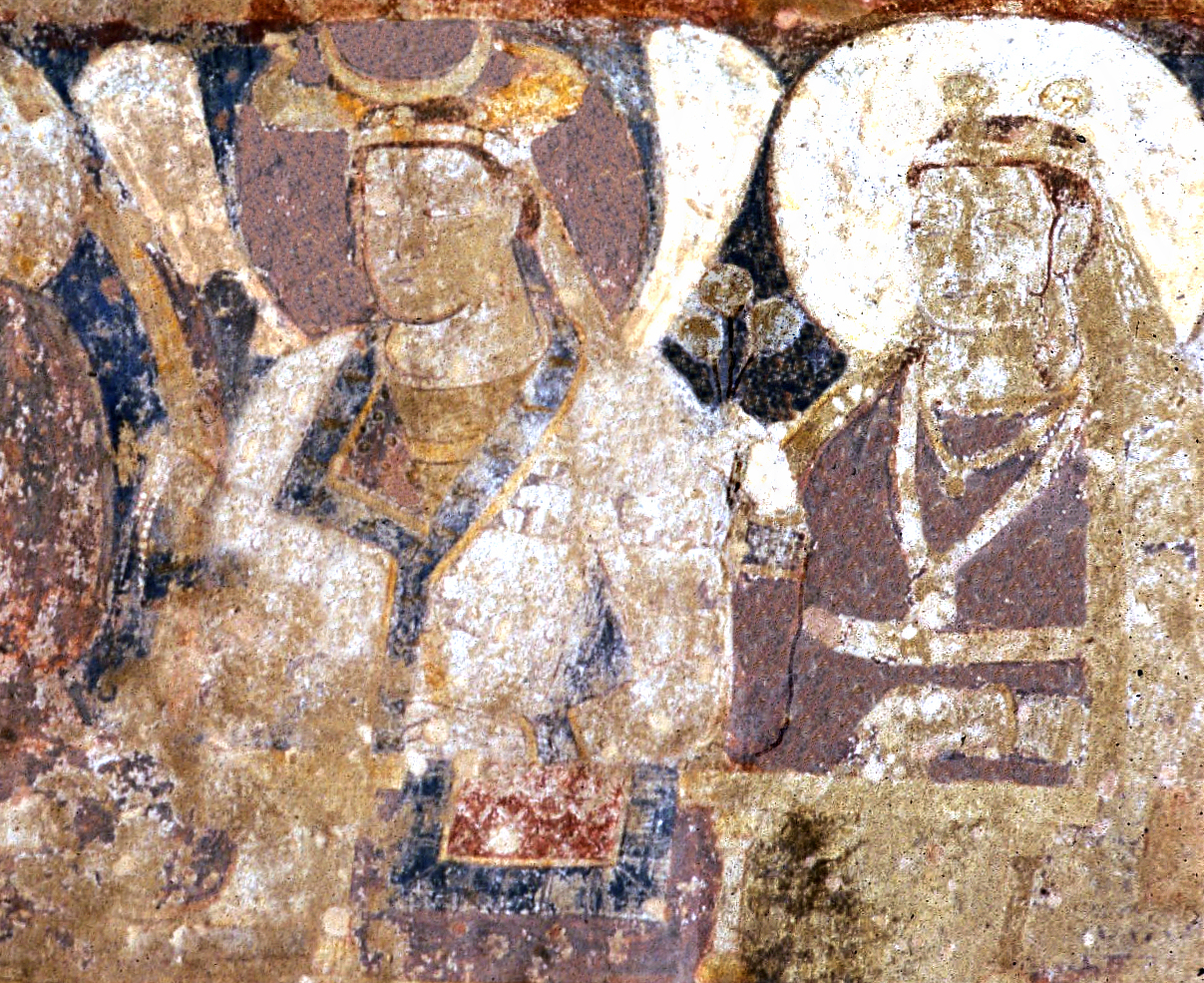
Probable Hephthalite royal couple in the murals of the Buddhas of Bamiyan circa 600 CE (the 38-meter Buddha they decorate is carbon dated to 544 – 595 CE). Their characteristics are similar to the figures in Balalyk Tepe, such as the right side triangular lapel, hairstyles, faces and ornaments, and reflect Hephthalite styles. The Bamiyan complex developed under Hephthalite rule.

The Hephthalites were first known to the Chinese in 456 CE, when a Hephthalite embassy arrived at the Chinese court of the Northern Wei. The Chinese used various names for the Hephthalites, such as Hua (滑), Ye-tha-i-li-to (simp. 厌带夷栗陁, trad. 厭帶夷粟陁) or more briefly Ye-da (嚈噠). Ancient imperial Chinese chronicles give various explanations about the origins of the Hephthalites:

- They were descendants "of the Gaoju or the Da Yuezhi" according to the earliest chronicles such as the Book of Wei or the History of the Northern Dynasties.
- They were descendants "of the Da Yuezhi tribes", according to many later chronicles.
- The ancient historian Pei Ziye conjectured that the "Hua" (滑) may be descendants of a Jushi general of the 2nd century CE because that general was named "Bahua" (八滑). This etymological fantasy was adopted by the Book of Liang (Volume 30 and Volume 54).
- Another etymological fantasy appeared in the Tongdian, reporting an account by the traveller Wei Jie according to which the Hephthalites may have been the descendants of the Kangju because a Kangju general of the Eastern Han happened to be named "Yitian".

Kazuo Enoki made a first groundbreaking analysis of the Chinese sources in 1959, suggesting that the Hephthalites were a local tribe of the Tokharistan (Bactria) region, with their origin in the nearby Western Himalayas. He also used as an argument the presence of numerous Bactrian names among the Hephthalites, and the fact that the Chinese reported that they practiced polyandry, a well-known West Himalayan cultural trait.

According to a recent reappraisal of the Chinese sources by de la Vaissière (2003), only the Turkic Gaoju origin of the Hephthalites should be retained as indicative of their primary ethnicity, and the mention of the Da Yuezhi only stems from the fact that, at the time, the Hephthalites had already settled in the former Da Yuezhi territory of Bactria, where they are known to have used the Eastern Iranian Bactrian language. The earliest Chinese source on this encounter, the near-contemporary chronicles of the Northern Wei (Weishu) as quoted in the later Tongdian, reports that they migrated southward from the Altai region circa 360 CE:

The Hephthalites are a branch of the Gaoju (高車, "High Carts") or the Da Yuezhi, they originated from the north of the Chinese frontier and came down south from the Jinshan (Altai) mountains [...] This was 80 to 90 years before Emperor Wen (r. 440–465 CE) of the Northern Wei (i.e. circa 360 CE)
嚈噠國，或云高車之別種，或云大月氏之別種。其原出於塞北。自金山而南。[...] 至後魏 文帝時已八九十年矣

— Extract of the Weishu chronicles as copied in Tongdian.

The Gaoju (高車 lit. "High Cart"), also known as Tiele, were early Turkic speakers related to the earlier Dingling, who were once conquered by the Xiongnu. Weishu also mentioned the linguistic and ethnic proximity between the Gaoju and the Xiongnu. De la Vaissière proposes that the Hephthalites had originally been one Oghuric-speaking tribe who belonged the Gaoju/Tiele confederation. This and several later Chinese chronicles also report that the Hephthalites may have originated from the Da Yuezhi, probably because of their settlement in the former Da Yuezhi territory of Bactria. Later Chinese sources become quite confused about the origins of the Hephthalites, and this may be due to their progressive assimilation of Bactrian culture and language once they settled there.

According to the Beishi, describing the situation in the first half of the 6th century CE around the time Song Yun visited Central Asia, the language of the Hephthalites was different from that of the Rouran, Gaoju or other tribes of Central Asia, but that probably reflects their acculturation and adoption of the Bactrian language since their arrival in Bactria in the 4th century CE. The Liangshu and Liang Zhigongtu do explain that the Hephthalites originally had no written language and adopted the hu (local, "Barbarian") alphabet, in this case, the Bactrian script.

Overall, de la Vaissière considers that the Hephthalites were part of the great Hunnic migrations of the 4th century CE from the Altai region that also reached Europe and that these Huns "were the political, and partly cultural, heirs, of the Xiongnu".

=== Appearance ===
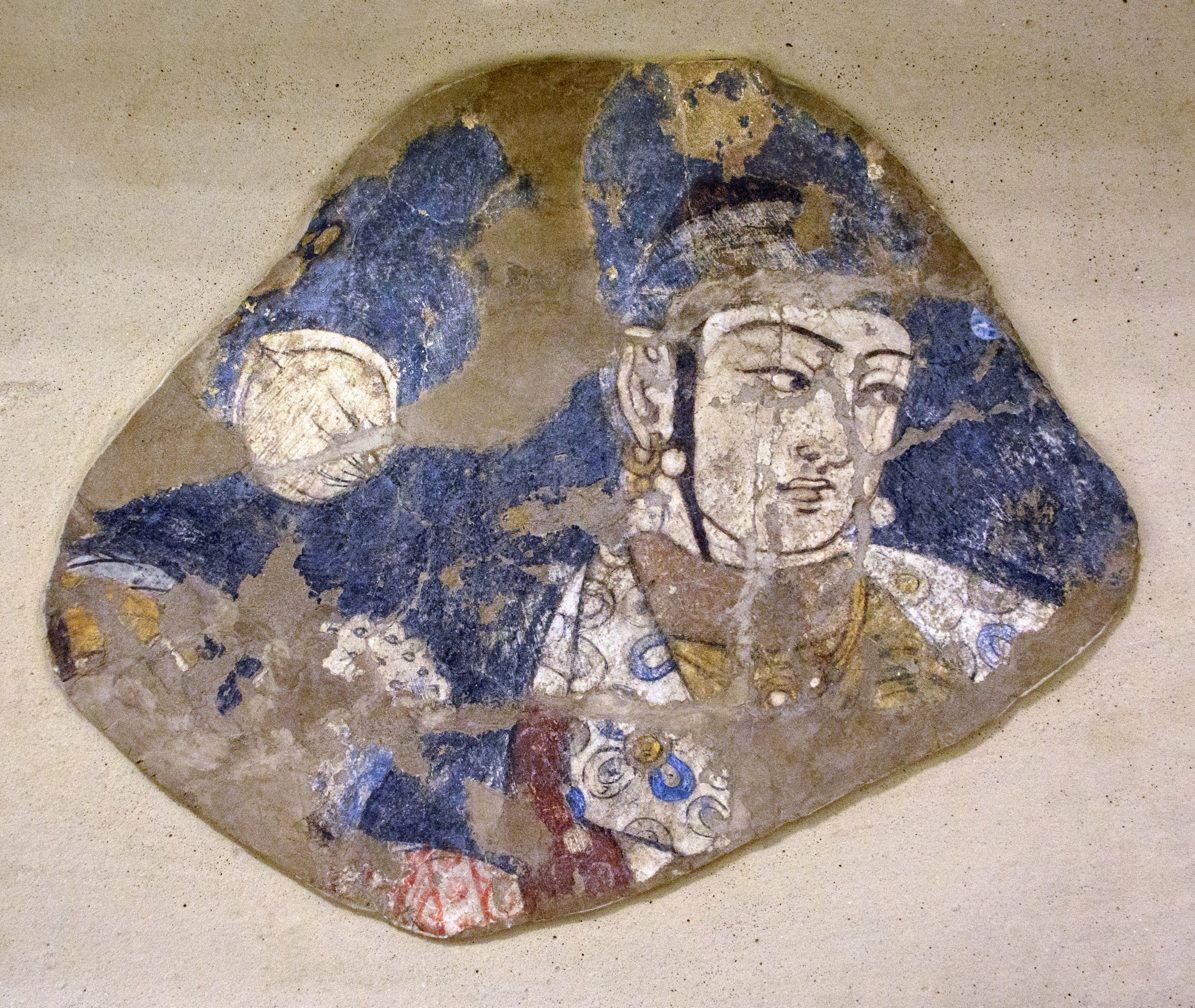
Another painting of the Tokharistan school, from Tavka Kurgan. It is closely related to Balalyk tepe, "especially in the treatment of the face". Termez Archaeological Museum.

The Hepthalites appear in several mural paintings in the area of Tokharistan, especially in banquet scenes at Balalyk tepe and as donors to the Buddha in the ceiling painting of the 35-meter Buddha at the Buddhas of Bamyan. Several of the figures in these paintings have a characteristic appearance, with belted jackets with a unique lapel of their tunic being folded on the right side, a style which became popular under the Hephthalites, the cropped hair, the hair accessories, their distinctive physiognomy and their round beardless faces. The figures at Bamyan must represent the donors and potentates who supported the building of the monumental giant Buddha. These remarkable paintings participate "to the artistic tradition of the Hephthalite ruling classes of Tukharistan".

The paintings related to the Hephthalites have often been grouped under the appellation of "Tokharistan school of art", or the "Hephthalite stage in the History of Central Asia Art". The paintings of Tavka Kurgan, of very high quality, also belong to this school of art, and are closely related to other paintings of the Tokharistan school such as Balalyk tepe, in the depiction of clothes, and especially in the treatment of the faces.

This "Hephthalite period" in art, with the caftans with a triangular collar folded on the right, the particular cropped hairstyle, the crowns with crescents, have been found in many of the areas historically occupied and ruled by the Hephthalites, in Sogdia, Bamyan (modern Afghanistan), or in Kucha in the Tarim Basin (modern Xinjiang, China). This points to a "political and cultural unification of Central Asia" with similar artistic styles and iconography, under the rule of the Hephthalites.

== History ==
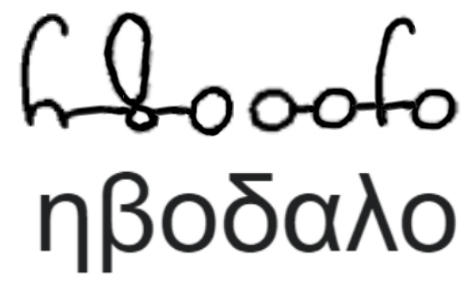
The Hephthalites used the Bactrian script (top), an adaptation of the Greek script (bottom). Here, their endonym Ebodalo, "Hephthalites".

The Hephthalites were a vassal state to the Rouran Khaganate until the beginning of the 5th century. There were close contacts between them, although they had different languages and cultures, and the Hephthalites borrowed much of their political organization from Rourans. In particular, the title "Khan", which according to McGovern was original to the Rourans, was borrowed by the Hephthalite rulers. The reason for the migration of the Hephthalites southeast was to avoid a pressure of the Rourans.

The Hephthalites became a significant political entity in Bactria around 450 CE, or sometime before. It has been commonly assumed that the Hephthalites formed a third wave of migrations into Central Asia, after the Chionites (who arrived circa 350 CE) and the Kidarites (who arrived from around 380 CE), but recent studies suggest that instead there may have been a single massive wave of nomadic migrations around 350–360 CE, the "Great Invasion", triggered by climate change and the onset of aridity in the grazing grounds of the Altay region, and that these nomadic tribes vied for supremacy thereafter in their new territories in Southern Central Asia. As they rose to prominence, the Hephthalites displaced the Kidarites and then the Alchon Huns, who expanded into Gandhara and Northern India.

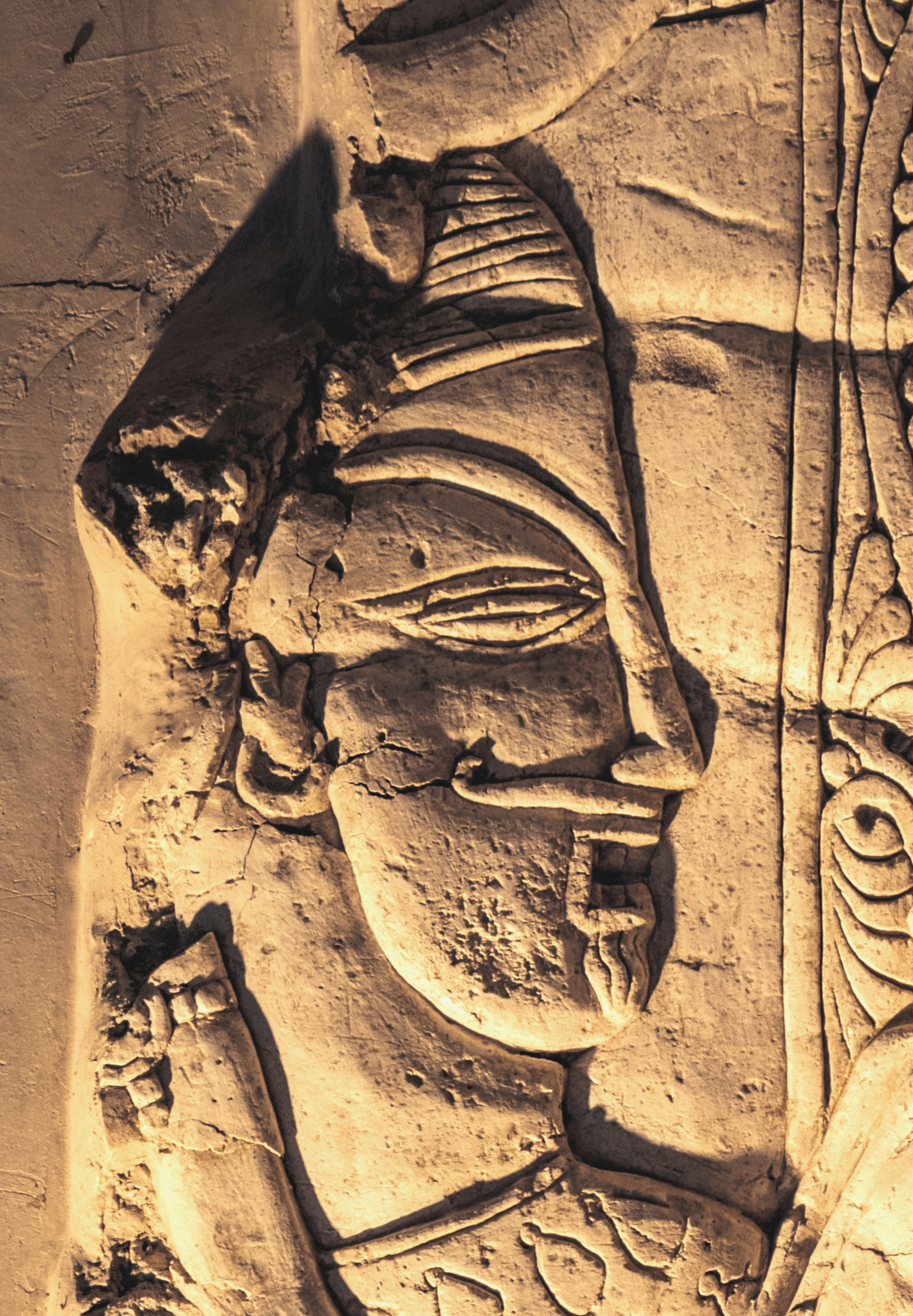
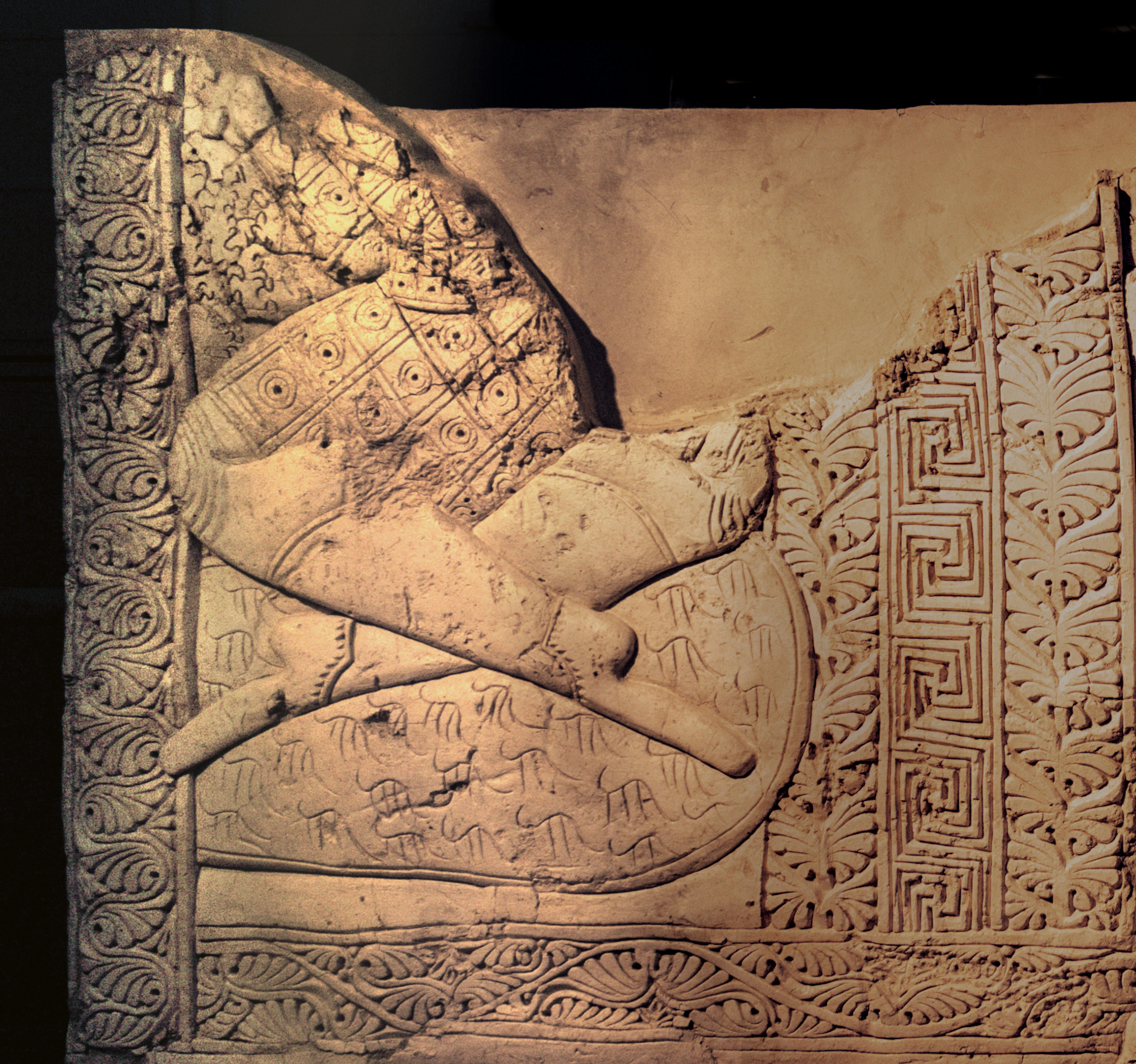
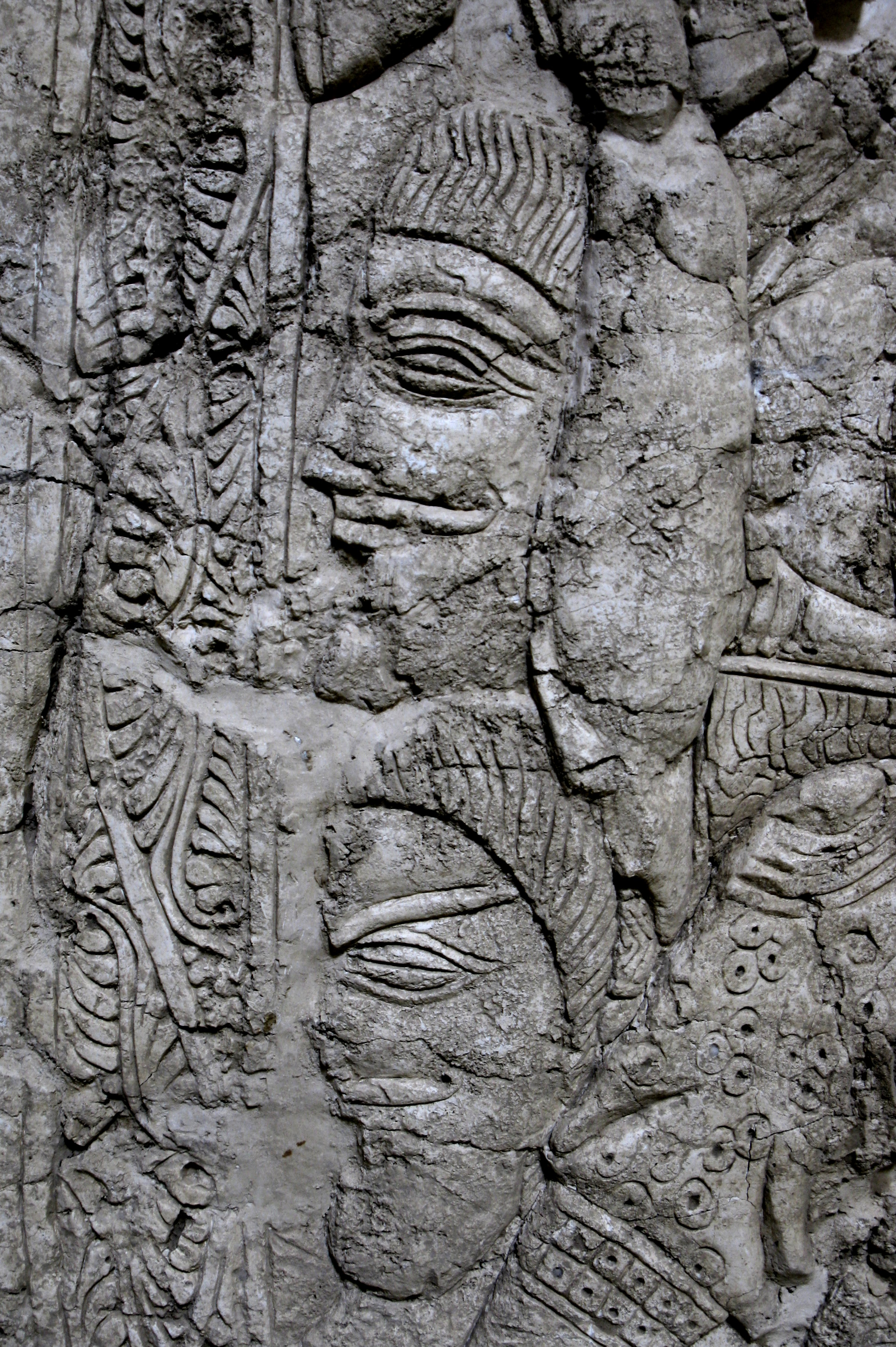
The Hephthalites as vanquished enemies (face down on the floor) in the Hephthalite–Sasanian Wars, and then as allies (seated), in the Sasanian Bandian complex. The inscription next to the seated ruler reads: "I am Hephthalite, son … the Hephthalite is trustworthy". 459-497 CE

The Hephthalites also entered into conflict with the Sasanians. The reliefs of the Bandian complex seem to show the initial defeat of the Hephthalites against the Sasanians in 425 CE, and then their alliance with them, from the time of Bahram V (420-438 CE), until they invaded Sasanian territory and destroyed the Bandian complex in 484 CE.

In 456–457 a Hephthalite embassy arrived in China, during the reign of Emperor Wen of the Northern Wei. By 458 they were strong enough to intervene in Persia.

Around 466 they probably took Transoxianan lands from the Kidarites with Persian help but soon took from Persia the area of Balkh and eastern Kushanshahr. In the second half of the fifth century they controlled the deserts of Turkmenistan as far as the Caspian Sea and possibly Merv. By 500 they held the whole of Bactria and the Pamirs and parts of Afghanistan. In 509, they captured Sogdia and they took 'Sughd' (the capital of Sogdiana).

To the east, they captured the Tarim Basin and went as far as Urumqi.

Around 560 CE their empire was destroyed by an alliance of the First Turkic Khaganate and the Sasanian Empire, but some of them remained as local rulers in the region of Tokharistan for the next 150 years, under the suzerainty of the Western Turks, followed by the Tokhara Yabghus. Among the principalities which remained in Hephthalite hands even after the Turkic overcame their territory were: Chaganian, and Khuttal in the Vakhsh Valley.

=== Ascendancy over the Sasanian Empire (442–c.530 CE) ===
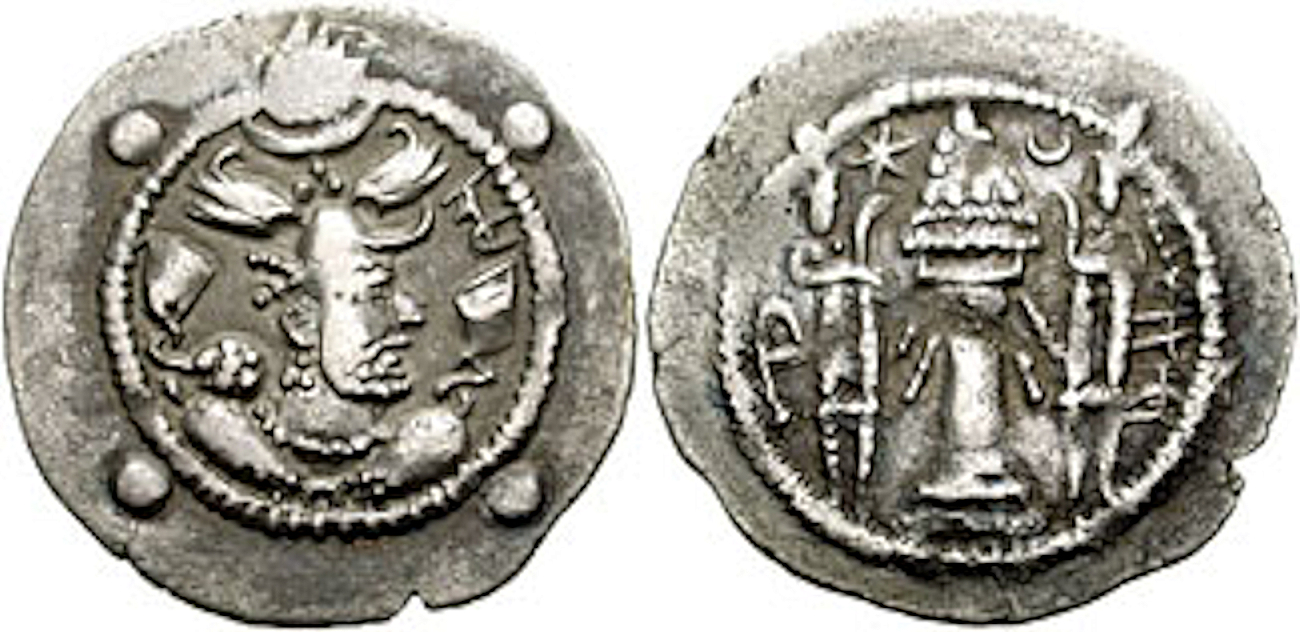
Early Hephthalite coinage: a close imitation of a coin type of the Sasanian Emperor Peroz I (third period coinage of Peroz I, after 474 CE). Late 5th century CE. This coinage is typically distinguished from Sasanian issues by dots around the border and the abbreviation (ηβ "ēb") in front of the crown of Peroz I, abbreviation of ηβοδαλο "ĒBODALO", for "Hepthalites".

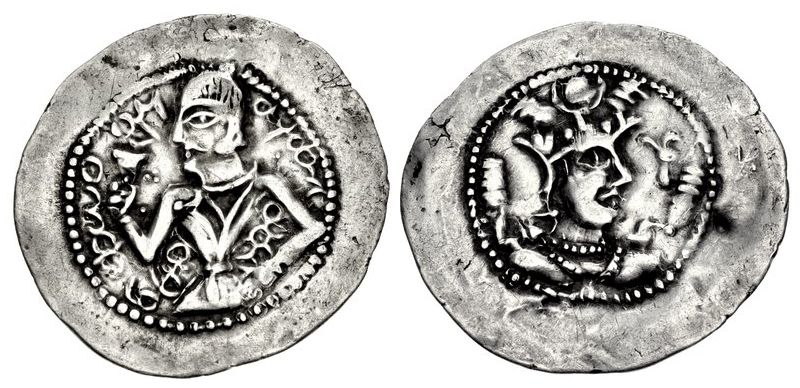
A rare Hephthalite coin. Obverse: Hephthalite prince wearing a belted caftan with single right lapel, and holding a drinking cup. Probable Bactrian legend ηβοδαλο "ĒBODALO" to the right. (Note: See another example (with coin description).) Reverse: Sasanian-style bust imitating Khavadh I, whom the Hephthalites had helped to the Sasanian throne. Hephthalite tamgha before the face of Khavad. First half of the 6th century CE.

The Hephthalites were originally vassals of the Rouran Khaganate but split from their overlords in the early fifth century. The next time they were mentioned was in Persian sources as foes of Yazdegerd II (435–457), who from 442, fought 'tribes of the Hephthalites', according to the Armenian Elisee Vardaped.

In 453, Yazdegerd moved his court east to deal with the Hephthalites or related groups.

In 458, a Hephthalite king called Akhshunwar helped the Sasanian Emperor Peroz I (458–484) gain the Persian throne from his brother. Before his accession to the throne, Peroz had been the Sasanian for Sistan in the far east of the Empire, and therefore had been one of the first to enter into contact with the Hephthalites and request their help.

The Hephthalites may have also helped the Sasanians to eliminate another Hunnic tribe, the Kidarites: by 467, Peroz I, with Hephthalite aid, reportedly managed to capture Balaam and put an end to Kidarite rule in Transoxiana once and for all. The weakened Kidarites had to take refuge in the area of Gandhara.

==== Victories over the Sasanian Empire (474–484 CE) ====
Later, however, from 474 CE, Peroz I fought three wars with his former allies the Hephthalites. In the first two, he himself was captured and ransomed. Following his second defeat, he had to offer thirty mules loaded with silver drachms to the Hephthalites, and also had to leave his son Kavad as a hostage. The coinage of Peroz I in effect flooded Tokharistan, taking precedence over all other Sasanian issues.

When Kavad was ransomed Peroz I again attacked the Hephthalites resulting In the third battle, the Battle of Herat (484), where he was defeated and killed by the Hepthalite king Kun-khi. For the next two years the Hephthalites plundered and controlled the eastern part of the Sasanian Empire. Perozduxt, the daughter of Peroz, was captured and became a lady as the Hephtalite court, as Queen of king Kun-khi. She became pregnant and had a daughter who would later marry her uncle Kavad I. From 474 until the middle of the 6th century, the Sasanian Empire paid tribute to the Hephthalites.

Bactria came under formal Hephthalite rule from that time. Taxes were levied by the Hephthalites over the local population: a contract in the Bactrian language from the archive of the Kingdom of Rob, has been found, which mentions taxes from the Hephthalites, requiring the sale of land in order to pay these taxes. It is dated to 483/484 CE.

==== Hephthalite coinage ====
With the Sasanian Empire paying a heavy tribute, from 474, the Hephthalites themselves adopted the winged, triple-crescent crowned Peroz I as the design for their coinage. Benefiting from the influx of Sasanian silver coins, the Hephthalites did not develop their own coinage: they either minted coins with the same designs as the Sasanians, or simply countermarked Sasanian coins with their own symbols. The coins countermarked with a Hephthalite sign were those used for the payment of tribute by the Sasanians. They did not inscribe the name of their ruler, contrary to the habit of the Alchon Huns or the Kidarites before them. Exceptionally, one coin type deviates from the Sasanian design, by showing the bust of a Hepthalite prince holding a drinking cup. Overall, the Sasanians paid "an enormous tribute" to the Hephthalites, until the 530s and the rise of Khosrow I.

==== Protectors of Kavad ====
Following their victory over Peroz I, the Hepthalites became protectors and benefactors of his son Kavad I, as Balash, a brother of Peroz took the Sasanian throne. Kavad I lived with the Hepthalites for four years and married the daughter or sister of the Hephthalite king, who provided him with troops. In 488, a Hepthalite army vanquished the Sasanian army of Balash, and was able to put Kavad I (488–496, 498–531) on the throne.

In 496–498, The Mazdakite movement and a revolt by the nobles and clergy overthrew Kavad I who fled to the Hephthalite.The Hephthalite king agreed to provide him with 30,000 troops, in return Kavad I was obliged to make territorial concessions and in 498 he handed over Chaganiyan to his allies.

Joshua the Stylite reports numerous instances in which Kavadh led Hepthalite ("Hun") troops, in the capture of the city of Theodosiupolis of Armenia in 501–502, in battles against the Romans in 502–503, and again during the siege of Edessa in September 503.

=== Hephthalites in Tokharistan (466 CE) ===
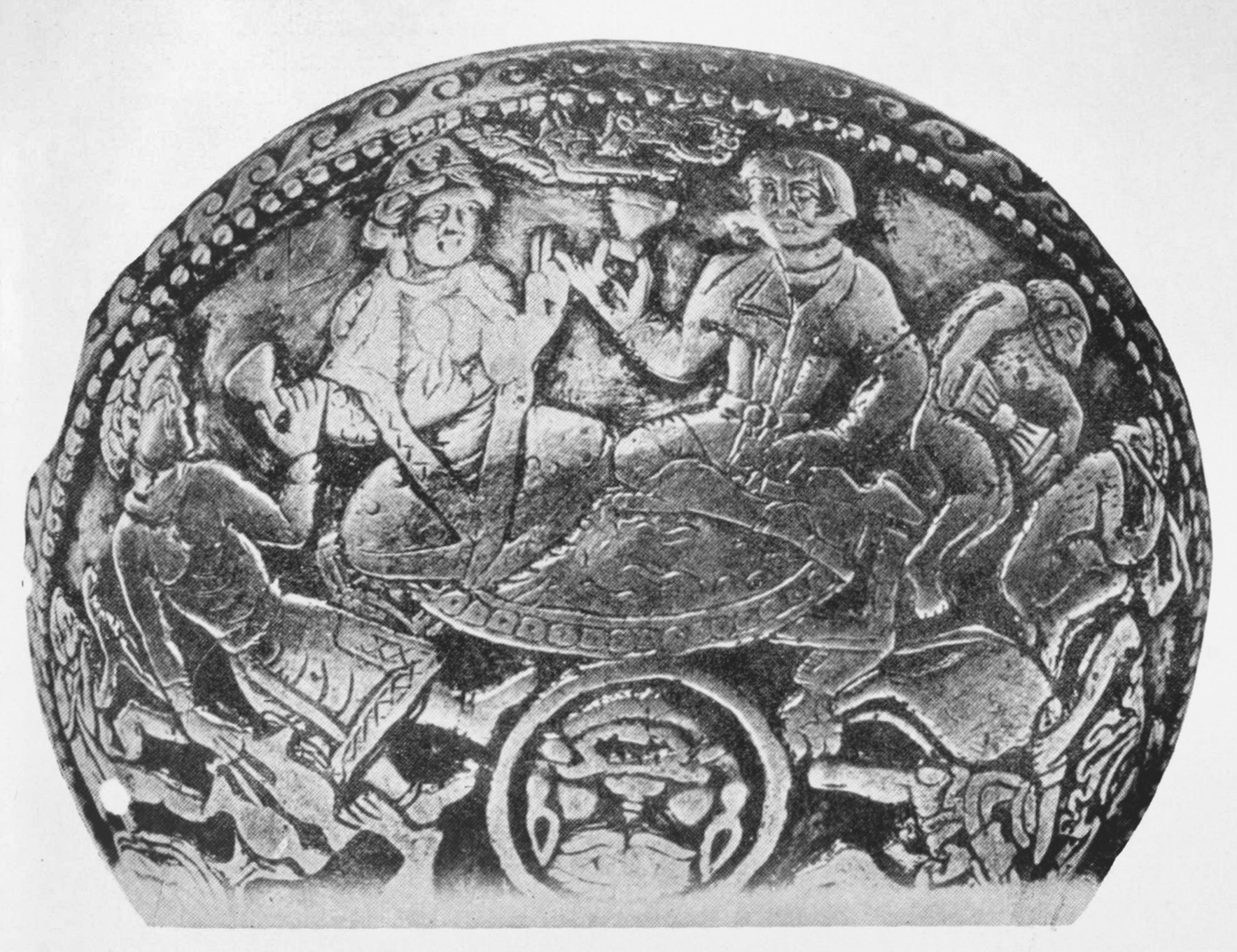
Hephthalite-style couple at a banquet, with man in single-lapel caftan. Inscription: "Dhenakk, the son of xwn (Hun)". Bactria, second half of the 5th century CE. St. Petersburg, State Hermitage Museum.

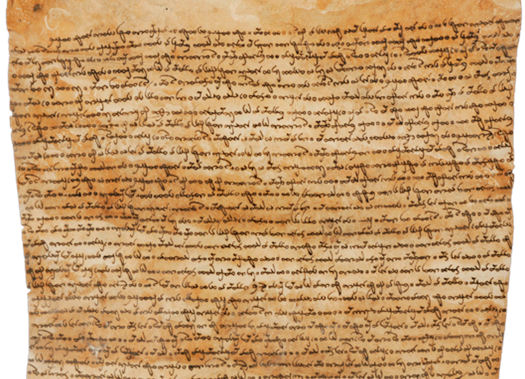
A tax receipt in Bactrian for the Hephthalites in Tokharistan. Archives of the Kingdom of Rob, 483/484 CE.

Around 461–462 CE, an Alchon Hun ruler named Mehama is known to have been based in Eastern Tokharistan, possibly indicating a partition of the region between the Hephthalites in western Tokharistan, centered on Balkh, and the Alchon Huns in eastern Tokharistan, who would then go on to expand into northern India. Mehama appears in a letter in the Bactrian language he wrote in 461–462 CE, where he describes himself as "Meyam, King of the people of Kadag, the governor of the famous and prosperous King of Kings Peroz". Kadag is Kadagstan, an area in southern Bactria, in the region of Baghlan. Significantly, he presents himself as a vassal of the Sasanian Empire king Peroz I, but Mehama was probably later able to wrestle autonomy or even independence as Sasanian power waned and he moved into India, with dire consequences for the Gupta Empire.

The Hepthalites probably expanded into Tokharistan following the destruction of the Kidarites in 466. The presence of the Hepthalites in Tokharistan (Bactria) is securely dated to 484 CE, date of a tax receipt from the Kingdom of Rob mentioning the need to sell some land in order to pay Hephthalite taxes. Two documents were also found, with dates from the period from 492 to 527 CE, mentioning taxes paid to Hephthalite rulers. Another, undated documents, mentions scribal and judiciary functions under the Hephthalites:

Sartu, the son of Hwade-gang, the prosperous Yabghu of the Hepthalite people (ebodalo shabgo); Haru Rob, the scribe of the Hephthalite ruler (ebodalo eoaggo), the judge of Tokharistan and Gharchistan.

— Document of the Kingdom of Rob.

=== Hephthalite conquest of Sogdiana (479 CE) ===
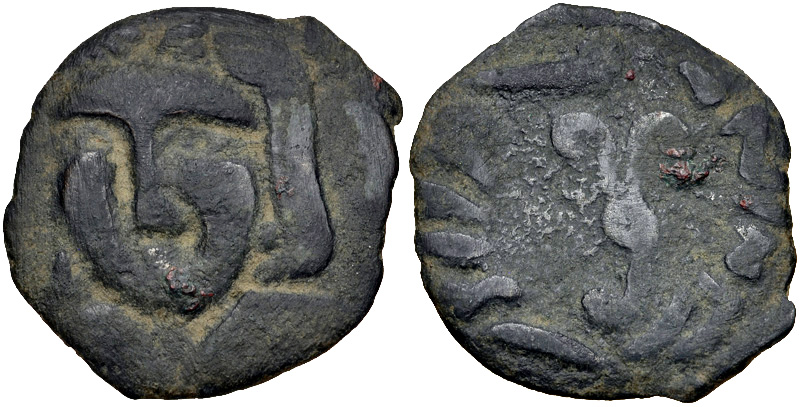
Local coinage of Samarkand, Sogdia, with the Hepthalite tamgha on the reverse.

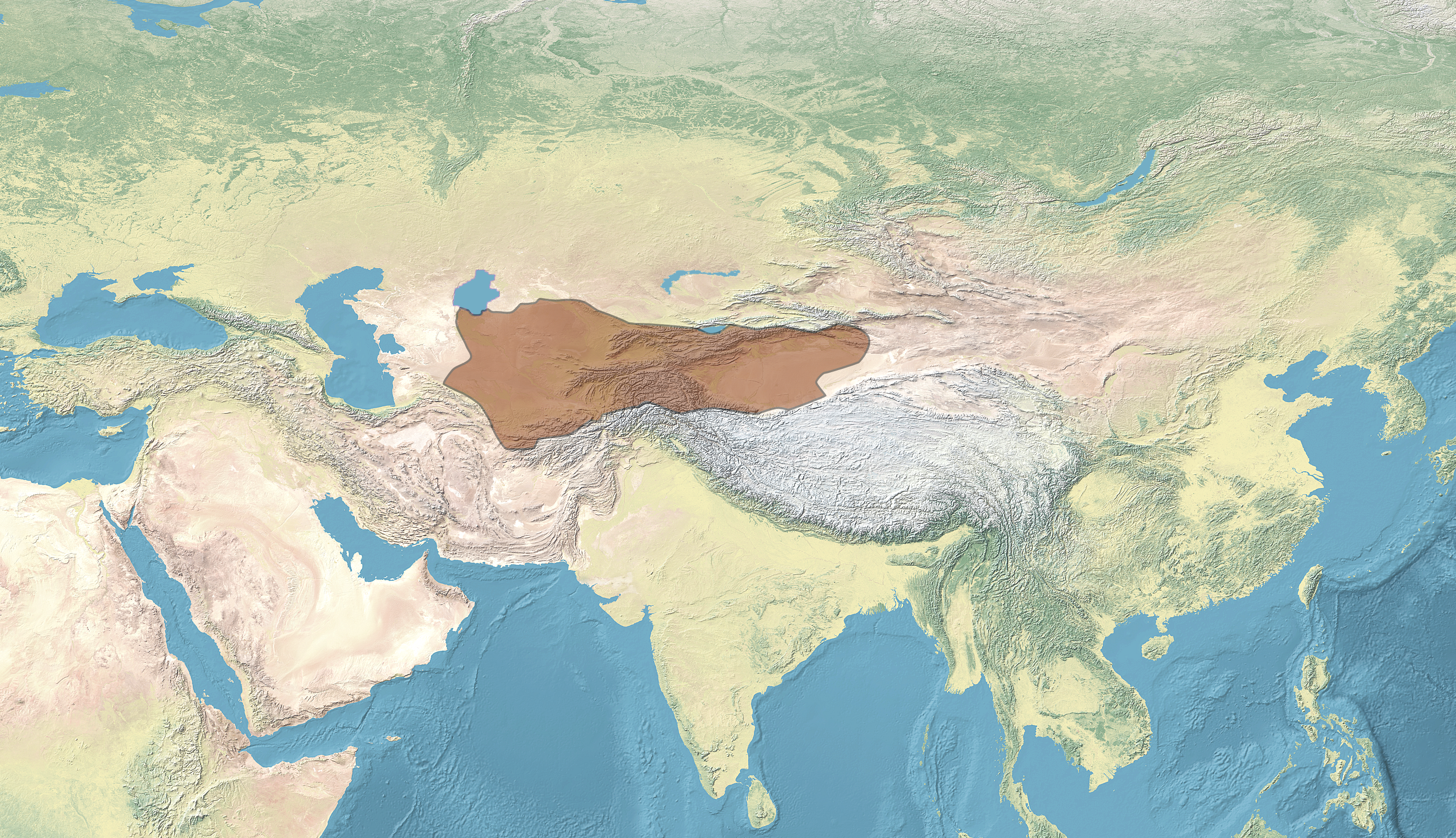
Territory of the Imperial Hephthalites and main Asian polities c. 500 CE

The Hephthalites conquered the territory of Sogdiana, beyond the Oxus, which was incorporated into their Empire. They may have conquered Sogdiana as early as 479 CE, as this is the date of the last known embassy of the Sogdians to China. The account of the Liang Zhigongtu also seems to record that from around 479 CE, the Hephthalites occupied the region of Samarkand. Alternatively, the Hephthalites may have occupied Sogdia later in 509 CE, as this is the date of the last known embassy from Samarkand to the Chinese Empire, but this might not be conclusive as several cities, such as Balkh or Kobadiyan, are known to have sent embassies to China as late as 522 CE, while under Hephthalite control. As early as 484, the famous Hephthalite ruler Akhshunwar, who defeated Peroz I, held a title that may be understood as Sogdian: "’xs’wnd’r" ("power-holder").

The Hephthalites may have built major fortified Hippodamian cities (rectangular walls with an orthogonal network of streets) in Sogdiana, such as Bukhara and Panjikent, as they had also in Herat, continuing the city-building efforts of the Kidarites. The Hephthalites probably ruled over a confederation of local rulers or governors, linked through alliance agreements. One of these vassals may have been Asbar, ruler of Vardanzi, who also minted his own coinage during the period.

The wealth of the Sasanian ransoms and tributes may have been reinvested in Sogdia, possibly explaining the prosperity of the region from that time. Sogdia, at the center of a new Silk Road between China to the Sasanian Empire and the Byzantine Empire became extremely prosperous under its nomadic elites. The Hephthalites took on the role of major intermediary on the Silk Road, after their great predecessor the Kushans, and contracted local Sogdians to carry on the trade of silk and other luxury goods between the China Empire and the Sasanian Empire.

Because of the Hephthalite occupation of Sogdia, the original coinage of Sogdia came to be flooded by the influx of Sasanian coins received as a tribute to the Hephthalites. This coinage then spread along the Silk Road. The symbol of the Hephthalites appears on the residual coinage of Samarkand, probably as a consequence of the Hephthalite control of Sogdia, and becomes prominent in Sogdian coinage from 500 to 700 CE, including in the coinage of their indigenous successors the Ikhshids (642-755 CE), ending with the Muslim conquest of Transoxiana.

=== Tarim Basin (circa 480–550 CE) ===
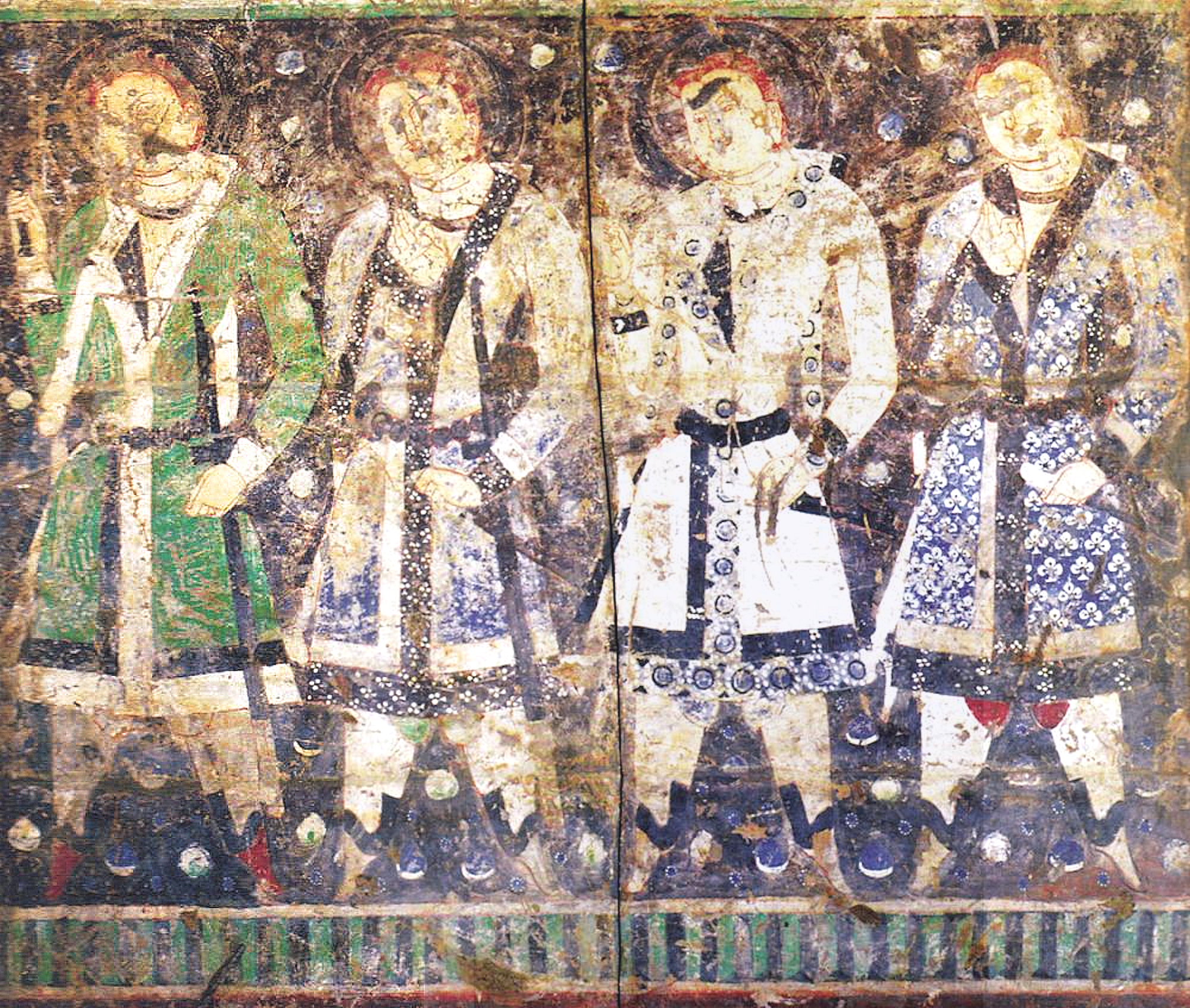
Kizil Caves swordsmen in Hephthalite style. This mural was carbon dated to 432–538 CE.

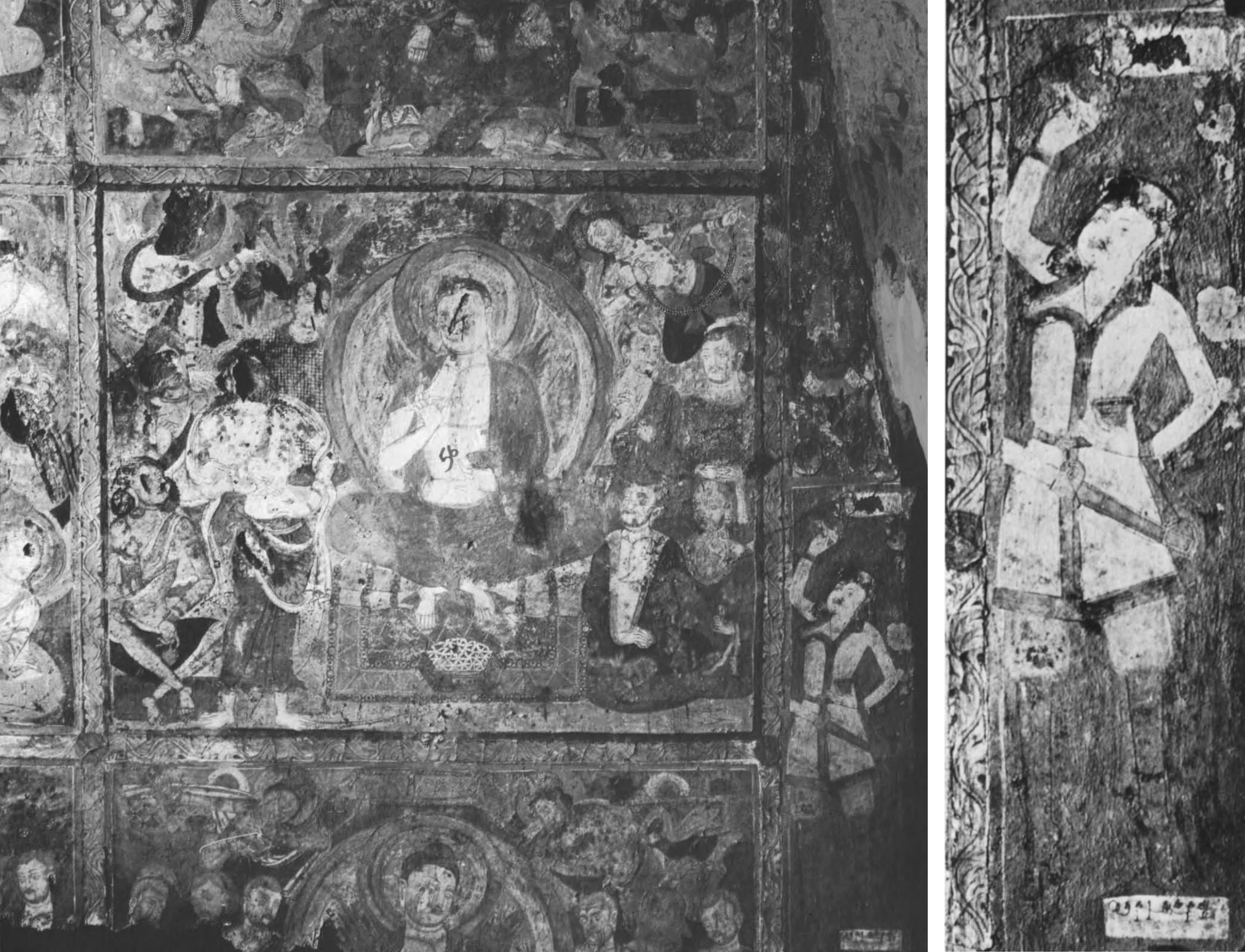
Painter in single-lapel caftan, Kizil Caves, circa 500 CE (enlarged detail). The label at his feet is in Sanskrit (Gupta script) and reads: "Painting of Tutuka" (Citrakara Tututkasya).

In the late 5th century CE they expanded eastward through the Pamir Mountains, which are comparatively easy to cross, as did the Kushans before them, due to the presence of convenient plateaus between high peaks. They occupied the western Tarim Basin (Kashgar and Khotan), taking control of the area from the Rourans, who had been collecting heavy tribute from the oasis cities, but were now weakening under the assaults of the Chinese Northern Wei dynasty. In 479 they took the east end of the Tarim Basin, around the region of Turfan. In 497–509, they pushed north of Turfan to the Urumchi region. In the early years of the 6th century, they were sending embassies from their dominions in the Tarim Basin to the Northern Wei dynasty. They were probably in contact with Li Xian, the Chinese Governor of Dunhuang, who is known for having furnished his tomb with a Western-style ewer probably made in Bactria.

The Hephthalites continued to occupy the Tarim Basin until the end of their Empire, circa 560 CE.

As the territories ruled by the Hephthalites expanded into Central Asia and the Tarim Basin, the art of the Hephthalites, characterized by the clothing and hairstyles of the figures being represented, also came to be used in the areas they ruled, such as Sogdiana, Bamyan or Kucha in the Tarim Basin (Kizil Caves, Kumtura Caves, Subashi reliquary). In these areas appear dignitaries with caftans with a triangular collar on the right side, crowns with three crescents, some crowns with wings, and a unique hairstyle. Another marker is the two-point suspension system for swords, which seems to have been an Hephthalite innovation, and was introduced by them in the territories they controlled. The paintings from the Kucha region, particularly the swordsmen in the Kizil Caves, appear to have been made during Hephthalite rule in the region, circa 480–550 CE. The influence of the art of Gandhara in some of the earliest paintings at the Kizil Caves, dated to circa 500 CE, is considered as a consequence of the political unification of the area between Bactria and Kucha under the Hephthalites. Some words of the Tocharian languages may have been adopted from the Hephthalites in the 6th century CE.

The early Turks of the First Turkic Khaganate then took control of the Turfan and Kucha areas from around 560 CE, and, in alliance with the Sasanian Empire, became instrumental in the fall of the Hepthalite Empire.

=== Hephthalite embassies to Liang China (516–526 CE) ===
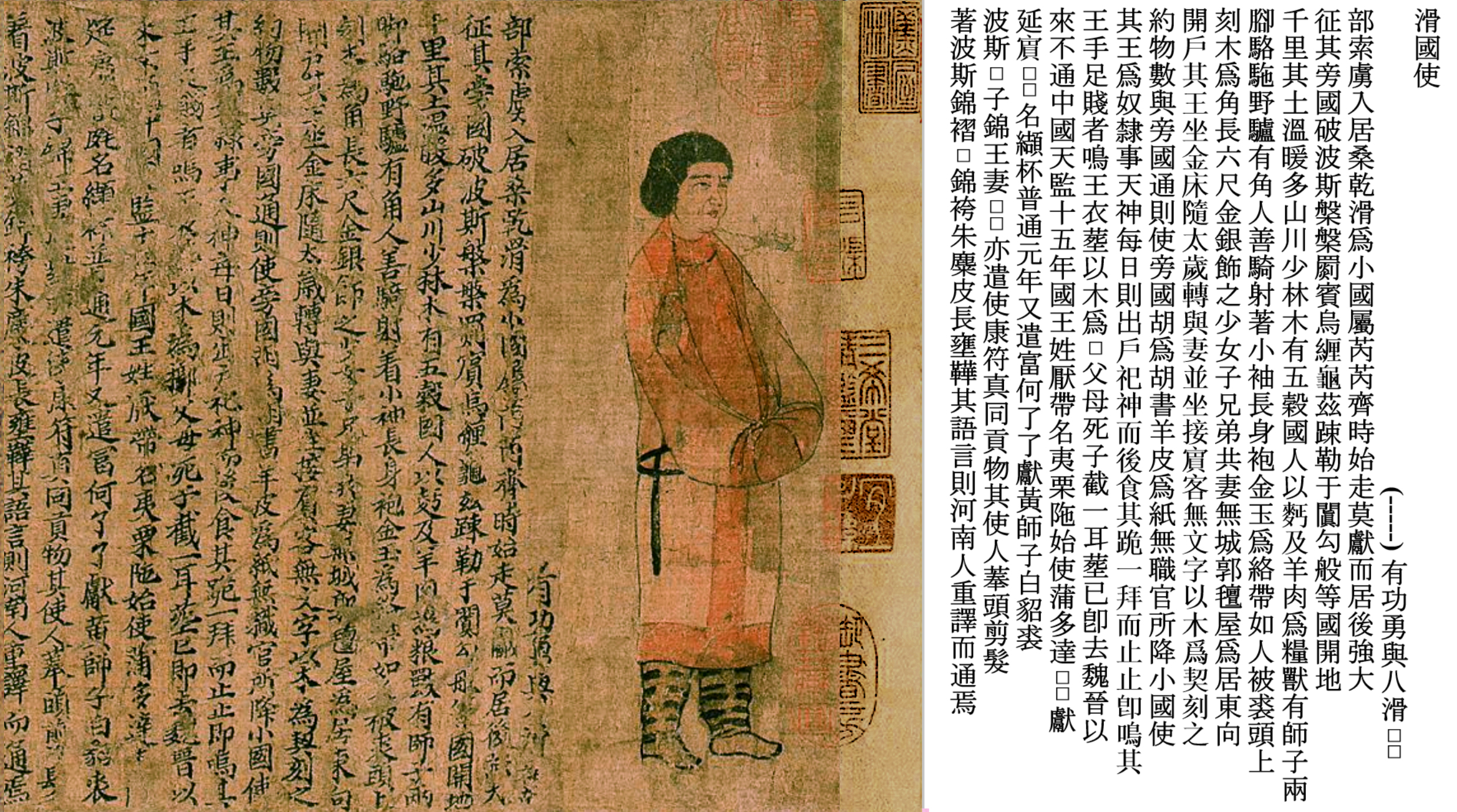
Hephthalite (滑, Hua) ambassador at the Chinese court of the Southern Liang in the capital Jingzhou in 516–526 CE, with explanatory text. Portraits of Periodical Offering of Liang, painted by Pei Ziye or the future Emperor Yuan of Liang while he was a Governor of the Province of Jingzhou as a young man between 526 and 539 CE. 11th century Song copy.

An illustrated account of a Hepthalite (滑, Hua) embassy to the Chinese court of the Southern Liang in the capital Jingzhou in 516–526 CE is given in Portraits of Periodical Offering of Liang, originally painted by Pei Ziye or the future Emperor Yuan of Liang while he was a Governor of the Province of Jingzhou as a young man between 526 and 539 CE, and of which an 11th-century Song copy is preserved. The text explains how small the country of the Hua was when they were still vassals of the Rouran Khaganate, and how they later moved to "Moxian", possibly referring to their occupation of Sogdia, and then conquered numerous neighbouring country, including the Sasanian Empire: (Note: A similar account of the rise and conquests of the Hua appears in the Liangshu (Volume 54))

When the Suolu (Northern Wei) entered (the Chinese frontier) and settled in the (valley of the river) Sanggan (i.e. in the period 398–494 CE), the Hua was still a small country and under the rule of the Ruirui. In the Qi period (479–502 CE), they left (their original area) for the first time and shifted to Moxian (possibly Samarkand), where they settled. Growing more and more powerful in the course of time, the Hua succeeded in conquering the neighbouring countries such as Bosi (Sasanid Persia), Panpan (Tashkurgan?), Jibin (Kashmir), Wuchang (Uddiyana or Khorasan), Qiuci (Kucha), Shule (Kashgar), Yutian (Khotan) and Goupan (Karghalik), and expanded their territory by a thousand li...

— "Hua" paragraph in Portraits of Periodical Offering of Liang.

The Portraits of Periodical Offering of Liang mentions that no envoys from the Hephthalites came before 516 to the southern court, and it was only in that year that a Hephthalite King named Yilituo Yandai (姓厭帶名夷栗陁) sent an ambassador named Puduoda[] (蒲多达[], possibly a Buddhist name "Buddhadatta" or "Buddhadāsa"). In 520, another ambassador named Fuheliaoliao (富何了了) visited the Liang court, bringing a yellow lion, a white marten fur coat and Persian brocade as present. Another ambassador named Kang Fuzhen (康符真), followed with presents as well (in 526 CE according to the Liangshu). Their language had to be translated by the Tuyuhun.

In Portraits of Periodical Offering of Liang, the Hepthalithes are treated as the most important foreign state, as they occupy the leading position, at the front of the column of foreign ambassadors, and have by far the largest descriptive text. The Hepthalites were, according to the Liangshu (Chap.54), accompanied in their embassy by three states: Humidan (胡蜜丹), Yarkand (周古柯, Khargalik) and Kabadiyan (呵跋檀). The envoys from right to left were: the Hephthalites (滑/嚈哒), Persia (波斯), Korea (百濟), Kucha (龜茲), Japan (倭), Malaysia (狼牙脩), Qiang (鄧至), Yarkand (周古柯, Zhouguke, "near Hua"), Kabadiyan (呵跋檀 Hebatan, "near Hua"), Kumedh (胡蜜丹, Humidan, "near Hua"), Balkh (白題, Baiti, "descendants of the Xiongnu and east of the Hua"), and finally Merv (末).

Most of the ambassadors from Central Asia are shown wearing heavy beards and relatively long hair, but, in stark contrast, the Hephthalite ambassador, as well as the ambassador from Balkh, are clean-shaven and bare-headed, and their hair is cropped short. These physical characteristics are also visible in many of the Central Asian seals of the period.

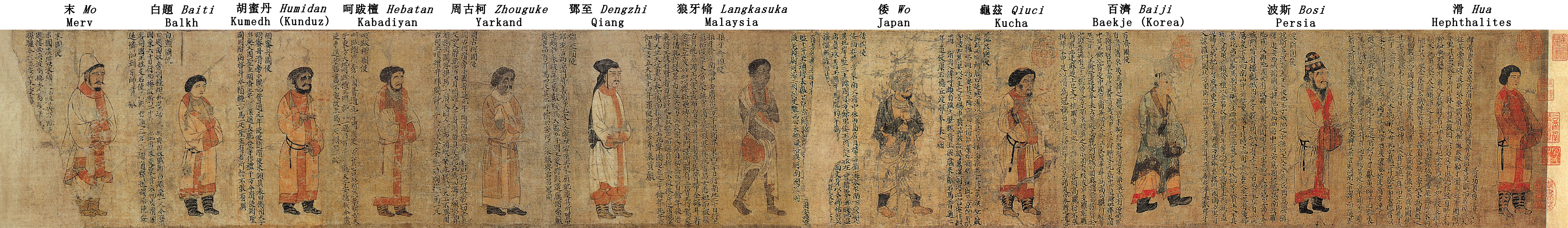
The Portraits of Periodical Offering of Liang with descriptions of each ambassador, led by the representative of the Hephthalites (far right), 526–539 CE Southern Liang painting. National Museum of China.

==== Other embassies ====
Overall, Chinese chronicles recorded twenty-four Hephthalite embassies: the first embassy in 456, and the others from 507 to 558 CE (including fifteen to the Northern Wei until the end of this dynasty in 535, and five to the Southern Liang in 516–541). The last three are mentioned in the Zhoushu, which records that the Hepththalites had conquered Anxi, Yutian (Hotan region in Xinjiang) and more than twenty other countries, and that they sent embassies to the Chinese court of the Western Wei and Northern Zhou in 546, 553 and 558 CE respectively, after what the Hepthalites were "crushed by the Turks" and embassies stopped.

The Hephthalites also requested and obtained a Christian bishop from the Patriarch of the Church of the East Mar Aba I circa 550 CE.

=== Buddhas of Bamiyan (544–644 CE) ===
Buddhas of Bamiyan

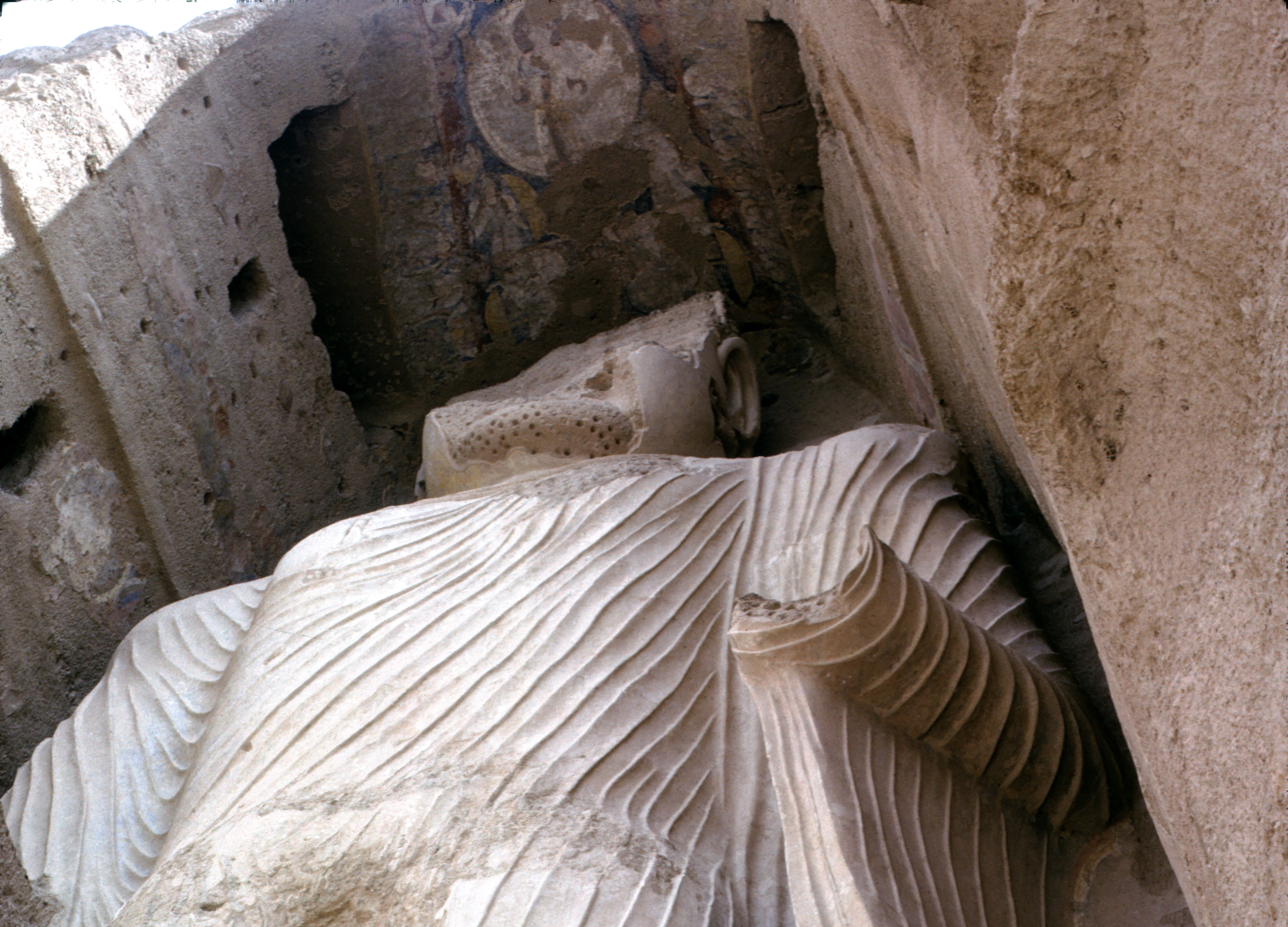
Painted ceiling over the head of the smaller 38-meter Eastern Buddha

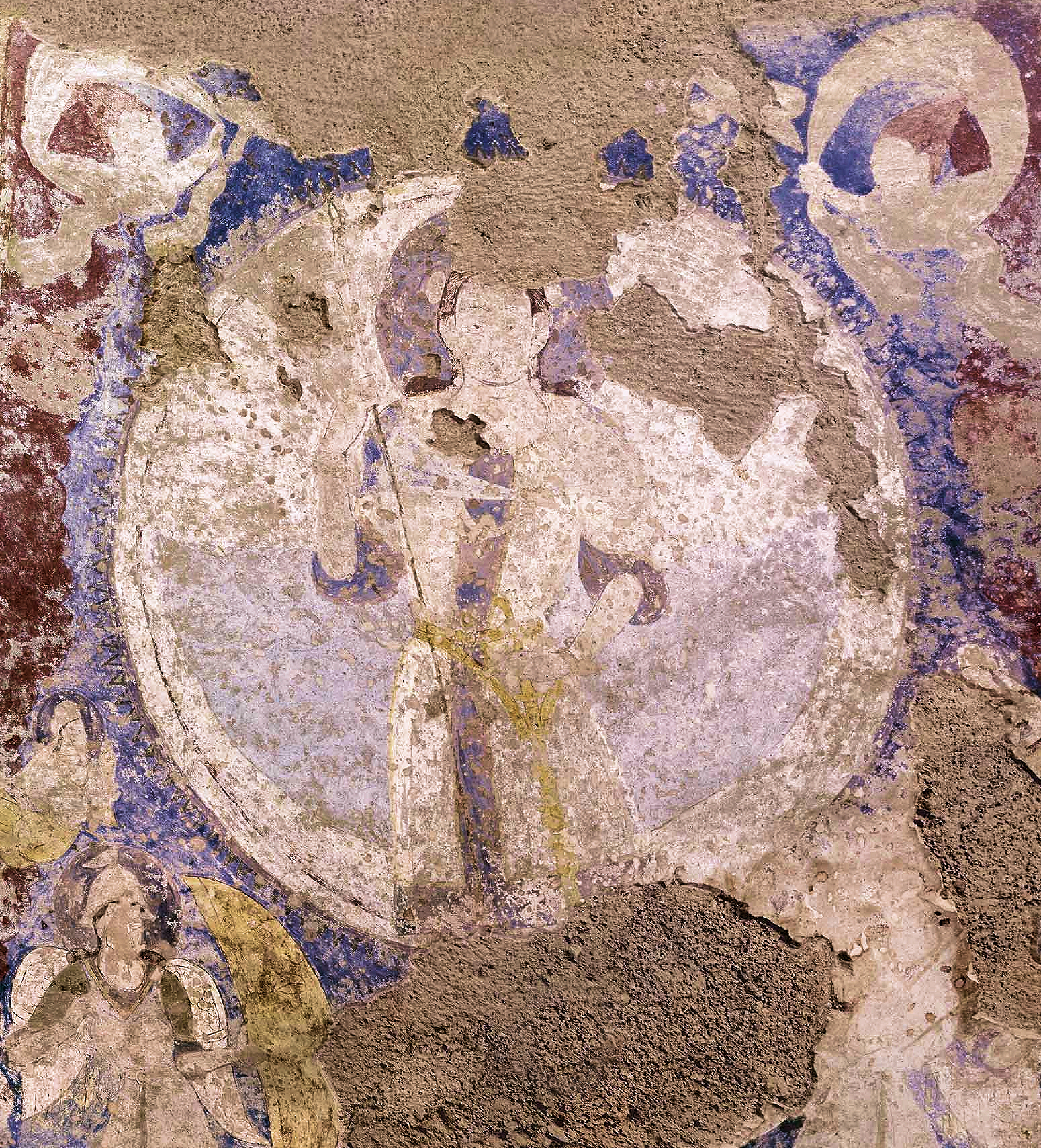
Sun God in Central Asian costume at the center of the ceiling.

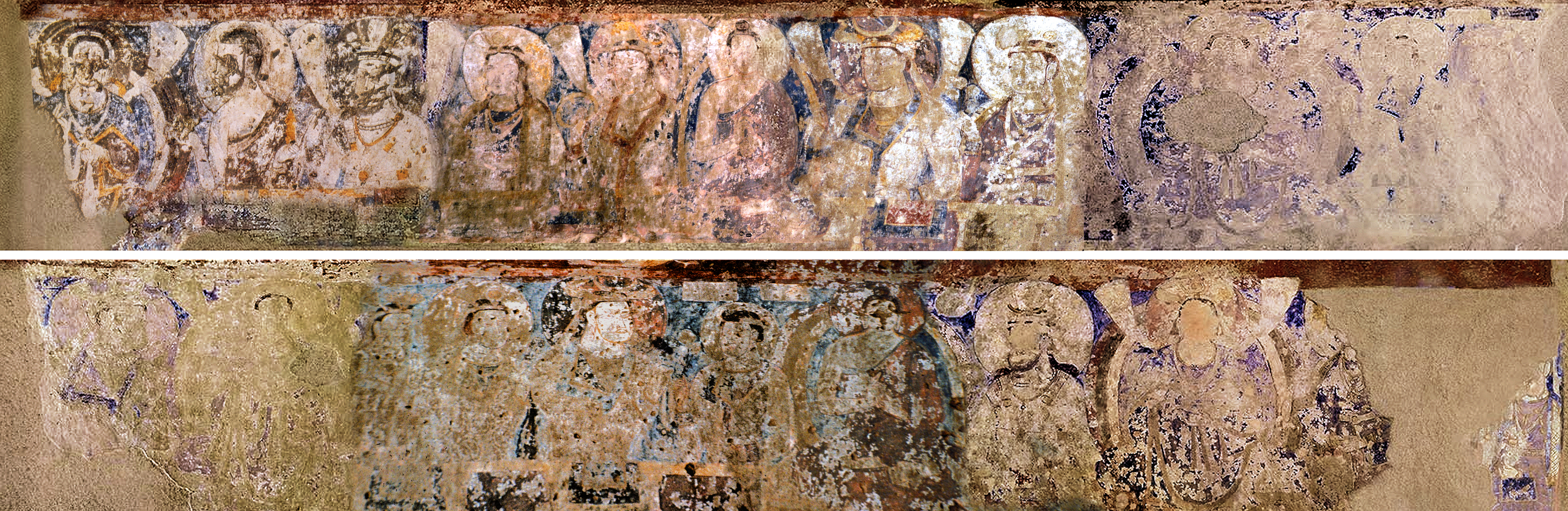
Rows of royal donors in Hephthalite costumes with sitting Buddhas, around the Sun God on the ceiling.

The Buddhas of Bamyan, carbon-dated to 544–595 CE and 591–644 CE respectively, were built under Hephthalite rule in the region. Murals of probable Hephthalite rulers as royal sponsors, around the central Sun God, appear in the paintings of the ceiling over the smaller Buddha.

Ruins of Shahr-e Zuhak, a Hephthalite fortress in Bamiyan

The complex of the Buddhas of Bamiyan was developed under Hephthalite rule. After the dissolution of their empire in 550–560, the Hephthalites continued to rule in the geographical areas corresponding to Tokharistan and today's northern Afghanistan, and particularly held a series of castles on the roads to Bamiyan. Carbon dating of the structural components of the Buddhas has determined that the smaller 38 m (125 ft) "Eastern Buddha" was built around 570 CE (544–595 CE with 95% probability), while the larger 55 m (180 ft) "Western Buddha" was built around 618 CE (591–644 CE with 95% probability). This corresponds to the period soon before or after the major defeat of the Hephthalites against the combined forces of Western Turk and Sasanian Empire (557 CE), or the following period during which they regrouped south of the Oxus as Principalities, but essentially before the Western Turks finally overran the region to form the Tokhara Yabghus (625 CE).

Among the most famous paintings of the Buddhas of Bamyan, the ceiling of the smaller Eastern Buddha represents a solar deity on a chariot pulled by horses, as well as ceremonial scenes with royal figures and devotees. The god is wearing a caftan in the style of Tokhara, boots, and is holding a lance, he is "The Sun God and a Golden Chariot Rising in Heaven". His representation is derived from the iconography of the Iranian god Mithra, as revered in Sogdia. He is riding a two-wheeled golden charriot, pulled by four horses. Two winged attendants are standing to the side of the charriot, wearing a Corinthian helmet with a feather, and holding a shield. In the top portion are wind gods, flying with a scarf held in both hands. This great composition is unique, and has no equivalent in Gandhara or India, but there are some similarities with the painting of Kizil or Dunhuang.

The central image of the Sun God on his golden chariot is framed by two lateral rows in individuals: Kings and dignitaries mingling with Buddhas and Bodhisattvas. One of the personages, standing behind a monk in profile, must be the King of Bamyan. He wears a crenelated crown with single crescent and korymbos, a round-neck tunic and a Sasanian headband. Several of the figures, either royal couples, crowned individuals or richly dressed women, have the characteristic appearance of the Hephthalites of Tokharistan, with belted jackets with a unique lapel of their tunic being folded on the right side, the cropped hair, the hair accessories, their distinctive physiognomy and their round beardless faces. These figures must represent the donors and potentates who supported the building of the monumental giant Buddha. They are gathered around the Seven Buddhas of the past and Maitreya. The individuals in this painting are very similar to the individuals depicted in Balalyk Tepe, and they may be related to the Hepthalites. They participate "to the artistic tradition of the Hephthalite ruling classes of Tukharestan".

These murals disappeared with the destruction of the statues by the Taliban in 2001.

=== Hephthalite royals on the tombs of Sogdian traders ===
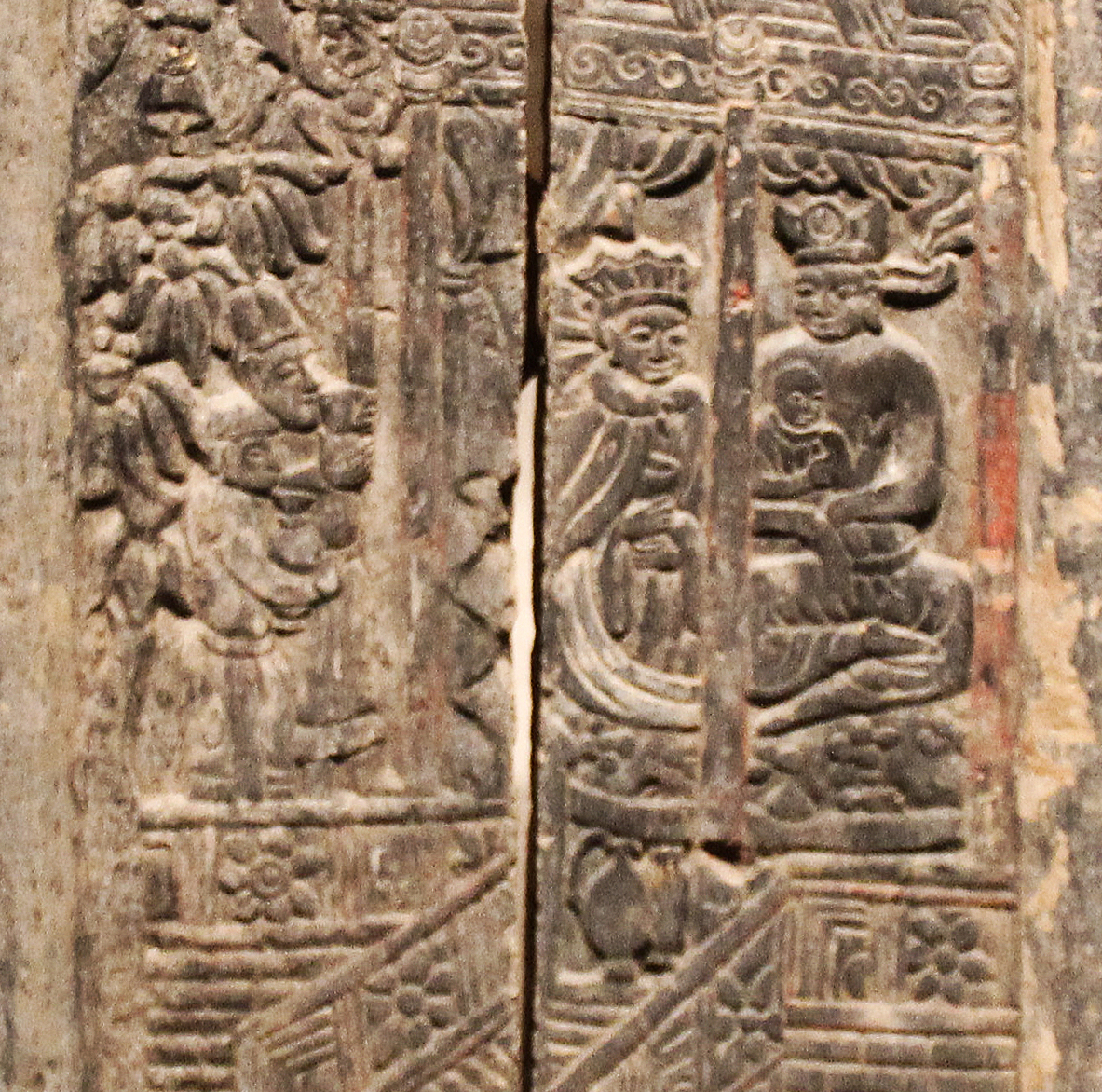
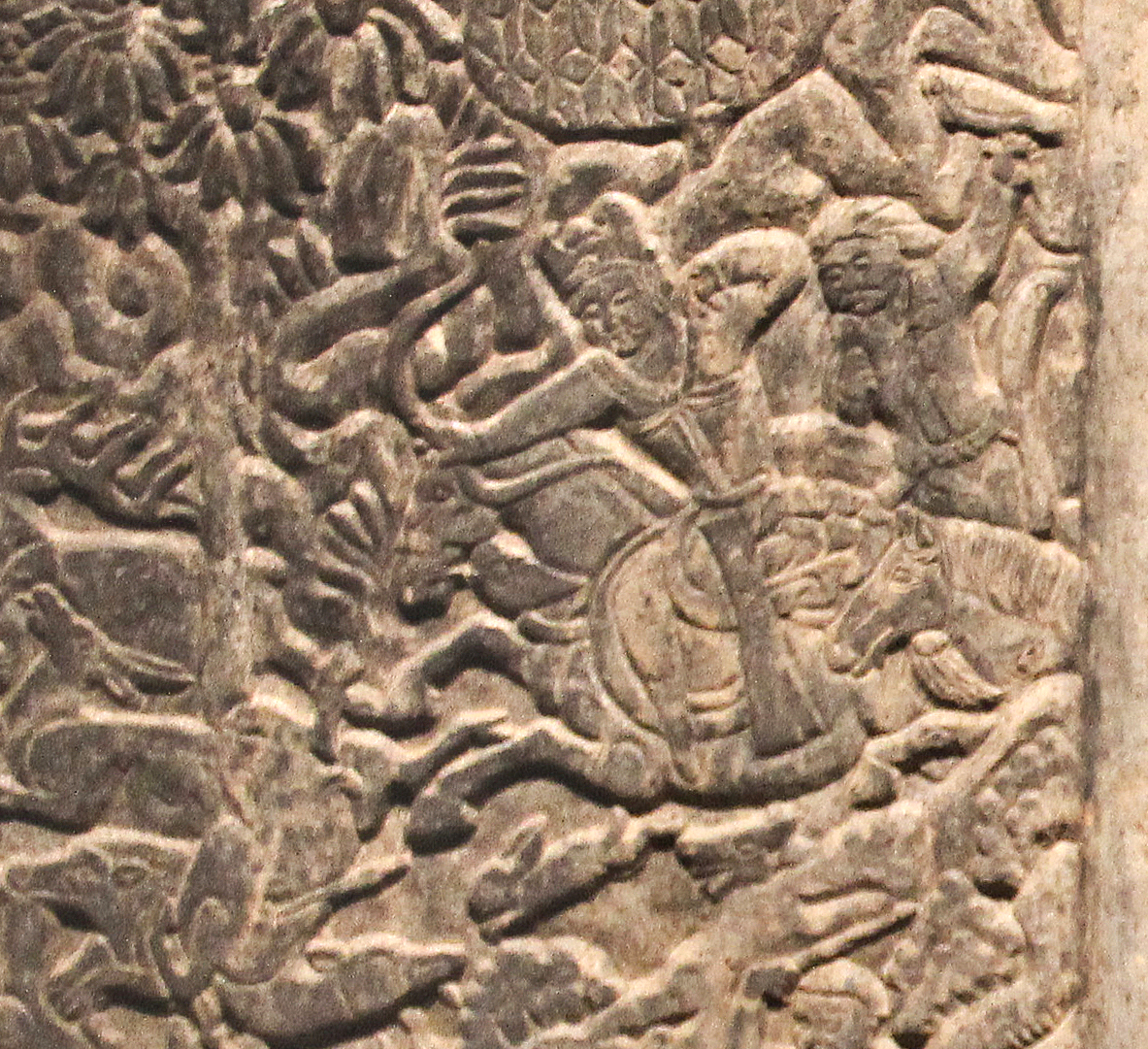
Probable Hephthalite royal figures in the Tomb of Wirkak (580 CE).

The Tomb of Wirkak is the tomb of a 6th-century Sogdian trader established in China, and discovered in Xi'an. It seems that depictions of Hephthalite rulers are omnipresent in the pictorial decorations of the tomb, as royal figures with elaborate Sasanian-type crowns appearing in their palaces, nomadic yurts or while hunting. Hephthalites rulers are shown short-haired, wearing tunics, and are often depicted together with their female consort. The Sogdian trader Wirkak may therefore have primarily dealt with the Hephthalites during his young years (he was around 60 when the Hephthalites were finally destroyed by the alliance of the Sasanians and the Turks between 556 and 560 CE). The Hephthalites also appear in four panels of the Miho funerary couch (c.570 CE) with somewhat caricatural features, and characteristics of vassals to the Turks. On the contrary, the depictions in the tombs of later Sogdian traders, such as the Tomb of An Jia (who was 24 years younger than Wirwak), already show the omnipresence of the Turks of the First Turkic Khaganate, who were probably his main trading partners during his active life.

=== End of the Empire and fragmentation into Hephthalite Principalities (560–710 CE) ===
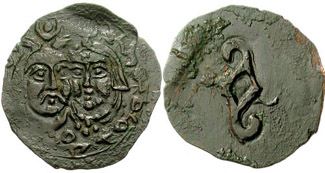
Hephthalite coin of the Principality of Chaghaniyan, after the fall of the Hephthalite Empire, with crowned King and Queen, in Byzantine fashion, circa 550–650 CE.

After Kavad I, the Hephthalites seem to have shifted their attention away from the Sasanian Empire, and Kavad's successor Khosrow I (531–579) was able to resume an expansionist policy to the east. According to al-Tabari, Khosrow I managed, through his expansionist policy, to take control of "Sind, Bust, Al-Rukkhaj, Zabulistan, Tukharistan, Dardistan, and Kabulistan" as he ultimately defeated the Hephthalites with the help of the First Turkic Khaganate.

In 552, the Göktürks took over Mongolia, formed the First Turkic Khaganate, and by 558 reached the Volga. Circa 555–567, (Note: The war is variously dated: 560–565 (Gumilyov, 1967); 555 (Stark, 2008, Altturkenzeit, 210); 557 (Iranica, "Khosrow II"); 558–561 (Bivar, "Hephthalites"); 557–563 (Baumer 2018, p. 174); 557–561 (Sinor 1990, p. 301); 560–563 (Litvinsky 1996, p. 143); 562–565 (Christian 1998, p. 252); c. 565 (Grousset 1970, p. 82); 567 (Chavannes, 1903, Documents, 236 and 229)) the Turks of the First Turkic Khaganate and the Sasanians under Khosrow I allied against the Hephthalites and defeated them after an eight-day battle near Qarshi, the Battle of Gol-Zarriun, perhaps in 557. (Note: Michael J. Decker states the battle occurred in 563.)

These events put an end to the Hephthalite Empire, which fragmented into semi-independent Principalities, paying tribute to either the Sasanians or the Turks, depending on the military situation. After the defeat, the Hephthalites withdrew to Bactria and replaced king Gatfar with Faghanish, the ruler of Chaghaniyan. Thereafter, the area around the Oxus in Bactria contained numerous Hephthalites principalities, remnants of the great Hephthalite Empire destroyed by the alliance of the Turks and the Sasanians. They are reported in the Zarafshan valley, Chaghaniyan, Khuttal, Termez, Balkh, Badghis, Herat and Kabul, in the geographical areas corresponding to Tokharistan and today's northern Afghanistan. They also held a series of castles on the roads to Bamiyan. Extensive Hephthalite kurghan necropoli have been excavated all over the region, as well as a possible one in the Bamiyan valley.

The Sasanians and Turks established a frontier for their zones of influence along the Oxus river, and the Hephthalite Principalities functioned as buffer states between two Empires. But when the Hephthalites chose Faghanish as their king in Chaganiyan, Khosrow I crossed the Oxus and put the Principalities of Chaghaniyan and Khuttal under tribute.

When Khosrow I died in 579, the Hephthalites of Tokharistan and Khotan took advantage of the situation to rebel against the Sasanians, but their efforts were obliterated by the Turks. By 581 or before, the western part of the First Turkic Khaganate separated and became the Western Turkic Khaganate. In 588, triggering the First Perso-Turkic War, the Turkic Khagan Bagha Qaghan (known as Sabeh/Saba in Persian sources), together with his Hephthalite subjects, invaded the Sasanian territories south of the Oxus, where they attacked and routed the Sasanian soldiers stationed in Balkh, and then proceeded to conquer the city along with Talaqan, Badghis, and Herat. They were finally repelled by the Sasanian general Vahram Chobin.

==== Raids into the Sasanid Empire (600–610 CE) ====
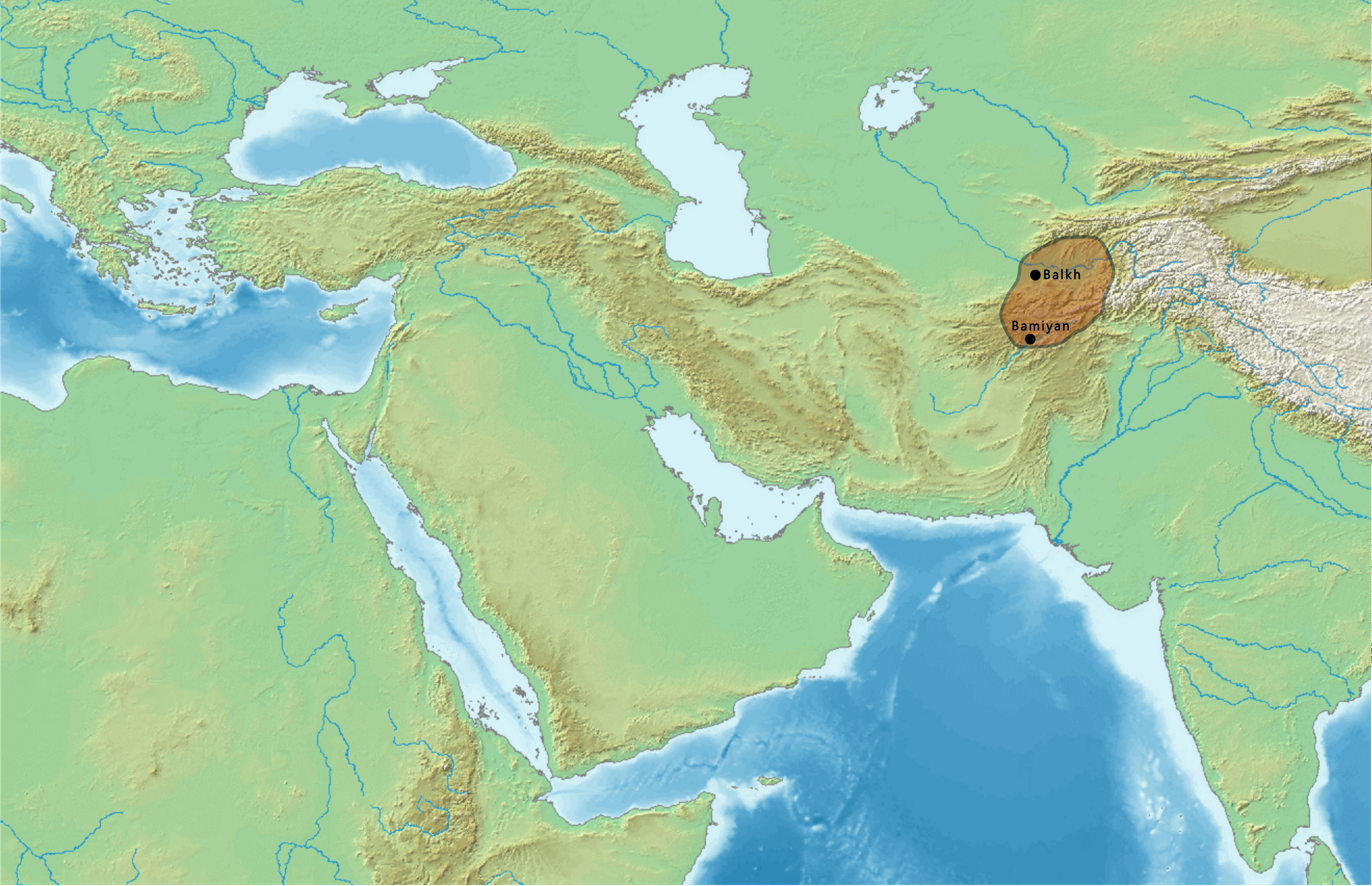
Hephthalite Principalities c. 557–710 CE

Circa 600, the Hephthalites were raiding the Sasanian Empire as far as Ispahan (Spahan) in central Iran. The Hephthalites issued numerous coins imitating the coinage of Khosrow II, adding on the obverse a Hephthalite signature in Sogdian and a Tamgha symbol.

Circa 616/617 CE the Göktürks and Hephthalites raided the Sasanian Empire, reaching the province of Isfahan. Khosrow recalled Smbat IV Bagratuni from Persian Armenia and sent him to Iran to repel the invaders. Smbat, with the aid of a Persian prince named Datoyean, repelled the Hephthalites from Persia, and plundered their domains in eastern Khorasan, where Smbat is said to have killed their king in single combat. Khosrow then gave Smbat the honorific title Khosrow Shun ("the Joy or Satisfaction of Khosrow"), while his son Varaztirots II Bagratuni received the honorific name Javitean Khosrow ("Eternal Khosrow").

==== Western Turk takeover (625 CE) ====
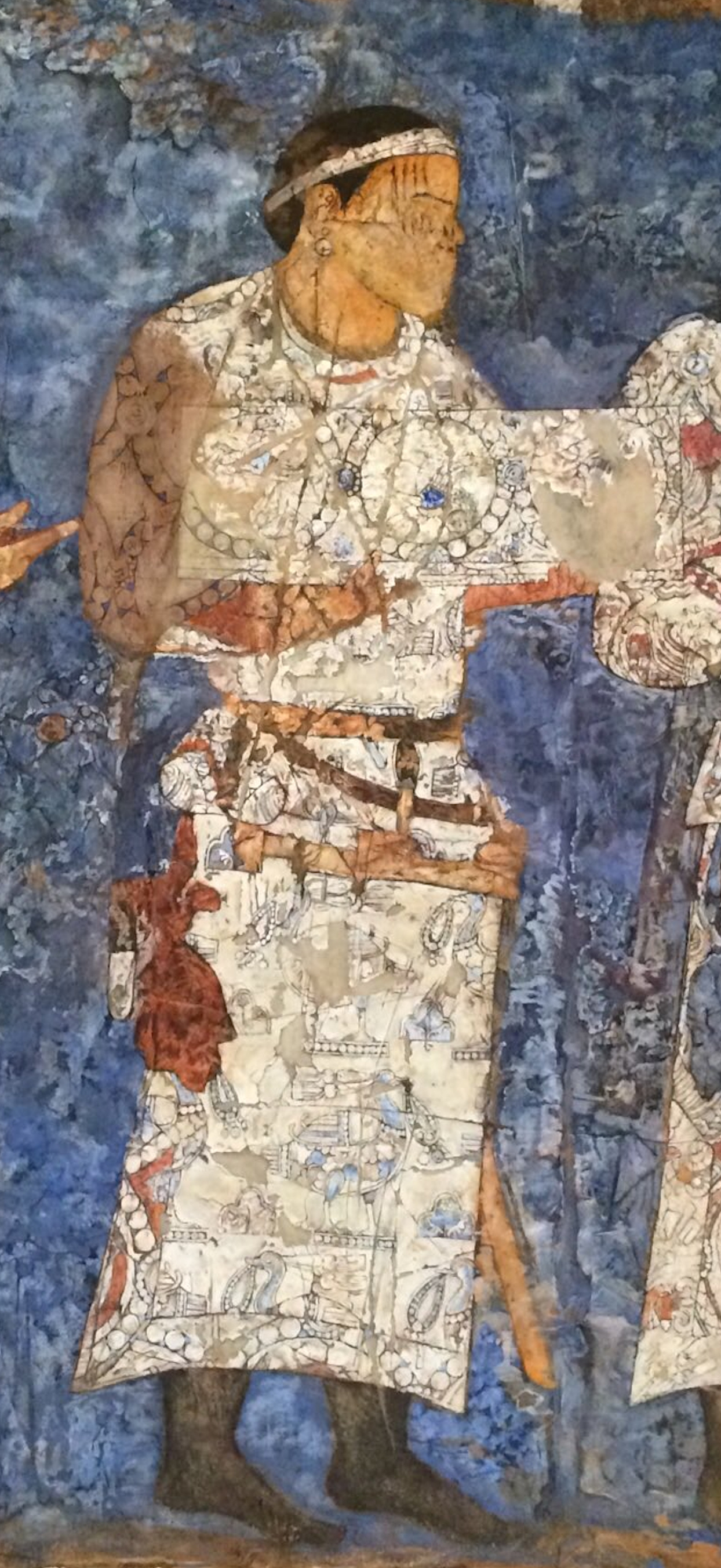
Ambassador from Chaganian visiting king Varkhuman of Samarkand 648–651 CE. Afrasiyab murals, Samarkand. Chaganian was an "Hephthalite buffer principality" between Denov and Termez.

From 625 CE, the territory of the Hephthalites from Tokharistan to Kabulistan was taken over by the Western Turks, forming an entity ruled by Western Turk nobles, the Tokhara Yabghus. The Tokhara Yabghus or "Yabghus of Tokharistan" (Chinese: 吐火羅葉護; pinyin: Tǔhuǒluó Yèhù), were a dynasty of Western Turk sub-kings, with the title "Yabghus", who ruled from 625 CE south of the Oxus river, in the area of Tokharistan and beyond, with some smaller polities surviving in the area of Badakhshan until 758 CE. Their legacy was extended to the southeast until the 9th century CE, with the Turk Shahis and the Zunbils.

==== Arab invasion (c.651 CE) ====
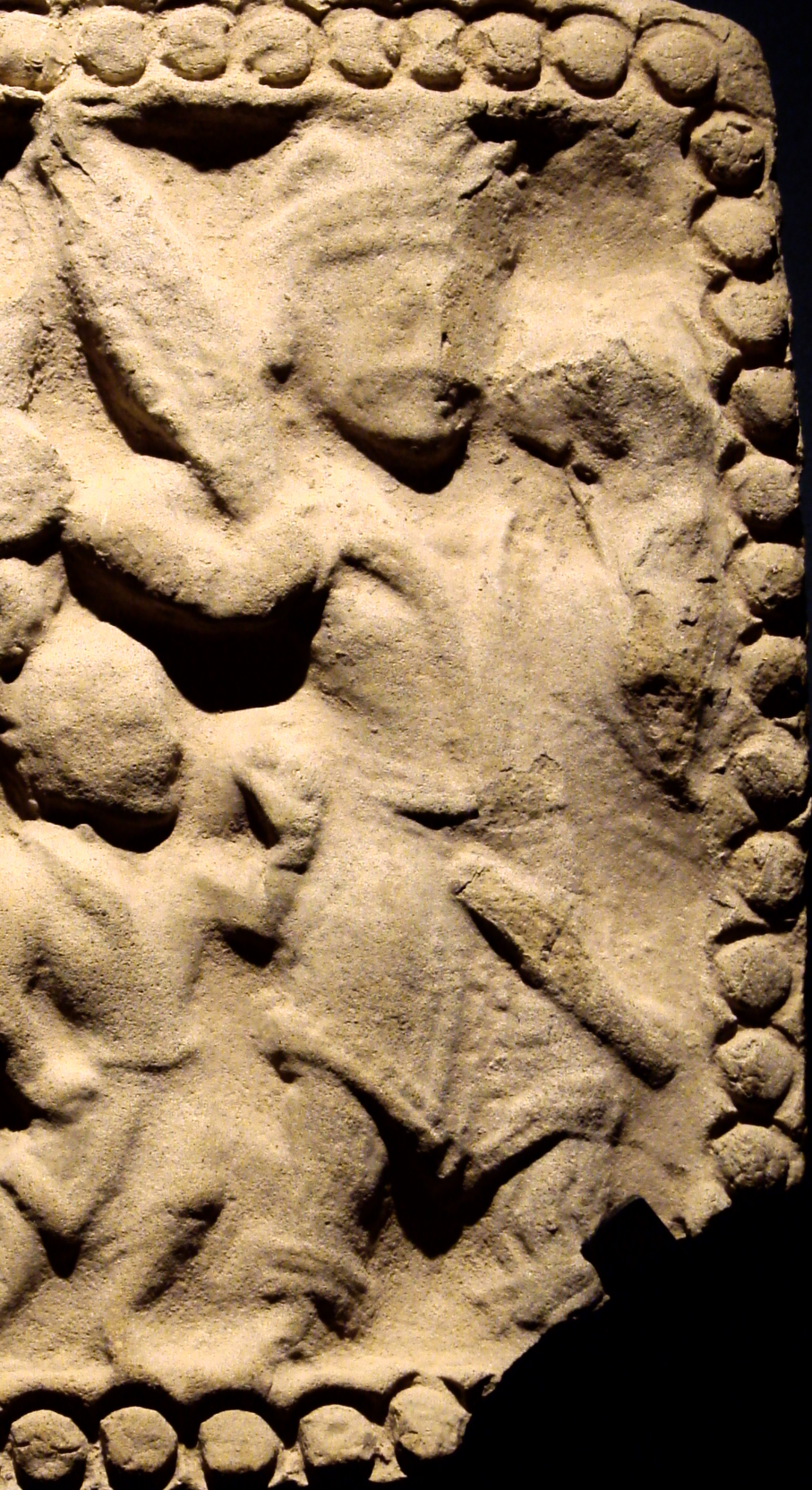
King wearing a caftan, with crescented crown, in a Buddhist donation scene. Kafyr Kala, Tajikistan, 7th century CE.

Circa 650 CE, during the Arab conquest of the Sasanian Empire, the Sasanian Empire ruler Yazdegerd III was trying to regroup and gather forces around Tokharistan and was hoping to obtain the help of the Turks, after his defeat to the Arabs in the Battle of Nihâvand (642 CE). Yazdegerd was initially supported by the Hephthalite Principality of Chaghaniyan, which sent him troops to aid him against the Arabs. But when Yazdegerd arrived in Merv (in what is today's Turkmenistan) he demanded tax from the Marzban of Marw, losing his support and making him ally with the Hephthalite ruler of Badghis, Nezak Tarkan. The Hepthalite ruler of Badghis allied with the Marzban of Merv attack Yazdegerd and defeated him in 651. Yazdegerd III barely escaped with his life but was murdered in the vicinity of Merv soon after, and the Arabs managed to capture the city of Merv the same year.

In 652 CE, following the Siege of Herat (652) to which the Hephthalites participated, the Arabs captured the cities of northern Tokharistan, Balkh included, and the Hepthalites principalities were forced to pay tribute and accept Arab garrisons. The Hephthalites again rebelled in 654 CE, leading to the Battle of Badghis.

In 659, Chinese chronicles still mentioned the "Hephtalite Tarkans" (悒達太汗 Yida Taihan, probably related to "Nezak Tarkan"), as some of the rulers in Tokharistan who remained theoretically subjects to the Chinese Empire, and whose main city was Huolu 活路 (modern Mazār-e Sherif, Afghanistan).

The city of Merv became the base of the Arabs for their Central Asian operations. The Arabs weakened during the 4-year civil war leading to the establishment of the Umayyad Caliphate in 661, but they were able to continue their expansion after that.

===== Hephthalite revolts against the Ummayad Caliphate (689–710 CE) =====
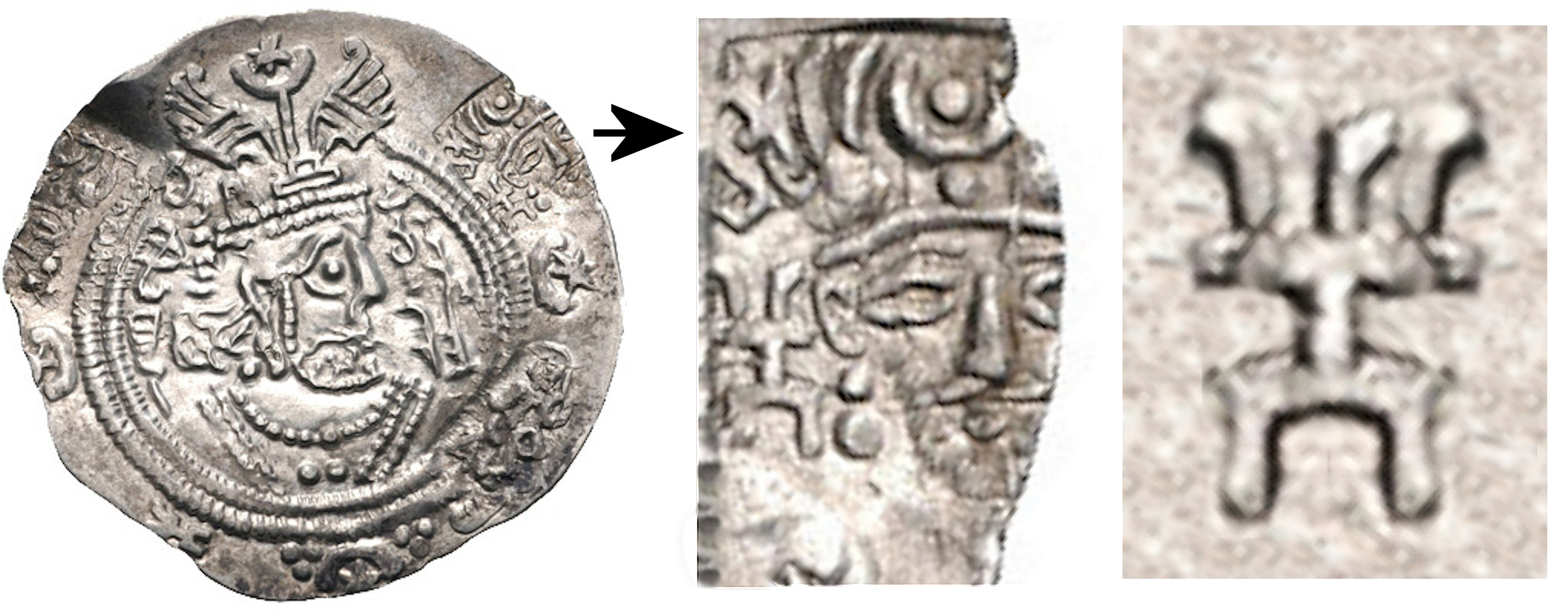
Hephthalite copy of a Sasano-Arab coin of Abd Allah ibn Khazim with AH 69 (688 CE) date. In the margin: a Hephthalite countermark with crowned facing head and a late tamgha. Circa 700 CE.

Circa 689 CE, the Hephthalite ruler of Badghis and the Arab rebel Musa ibn Abd Allah ibn Khazim, son of the Zubayrid governor of Khurasan Abd Allah ibn Khazim al-Sulami, allied against the forces of the Umayyad Caliphate. The Hepthalites and their allies captured Termez in 689, repelled the Arabs, and occupied the whole region of Khorasan for a brief period, with Termez as the capital, described by the Arabs as "the headquarters of the Hephthalites" (dār mamlakat al-Hayāṭela). The Arabs of the Umayyad Caliphate under Yazid ibn al-Muhallab re-captured Termez in 704. Nezak Tarkan, the ruler of the Hephthalites of Badghis, led a new revolt in 709 with the support of other principalities as well as his nominal ruler, the Yabghu of Tokharistan. In 710, Qutaiba ibn Muslim was able to re-establish Muslim control over Tokharistan and captured Nezak Tarkan who was executed on al-Hajjaj's orders, despite promises of pardon, while the Yabghu was exiled to Damascus and kept there as a hostage.

In 718 CE, Chinese chronicles still mention the Hephthalites (悒達 Yida) as one of the polities under the suzerainty of the Turkic Tokhara Yabghus, capable of providing 50,000 soldiers at the service of its overlord. Some remnants, not necessarily dynastic, of the Hephthalite confederation would be incorporated into the Göktürks, as an Old Tibetan document, dated to the 8th century, mentioned the tribe Heb-dal among 12 Dru-gu tribes ruled by Eastern Turkic khagan Bug-chor, i.e. Qapaghan Qaghan Chinese chronicles report embassies from the "Hephtalite kingdom" as late as 748 CE.

== Military and weapons ==
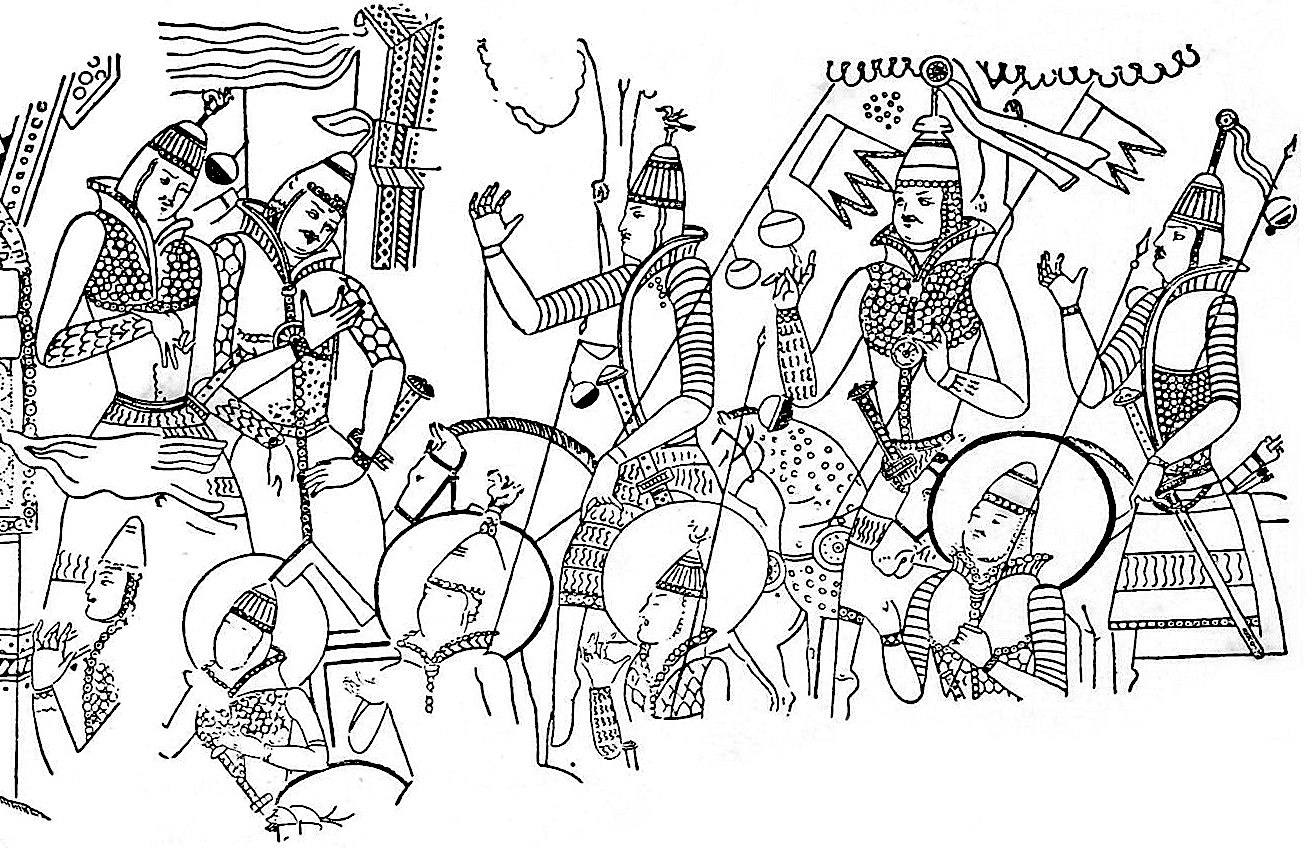
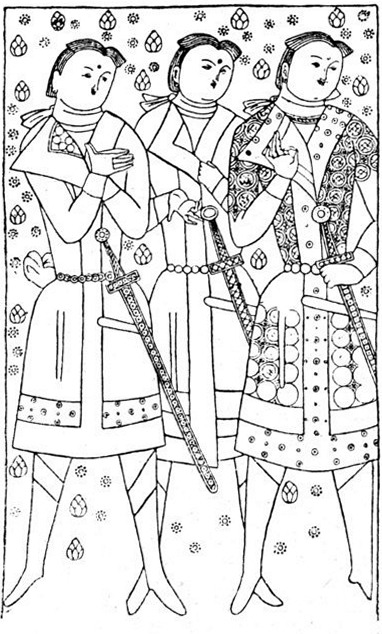
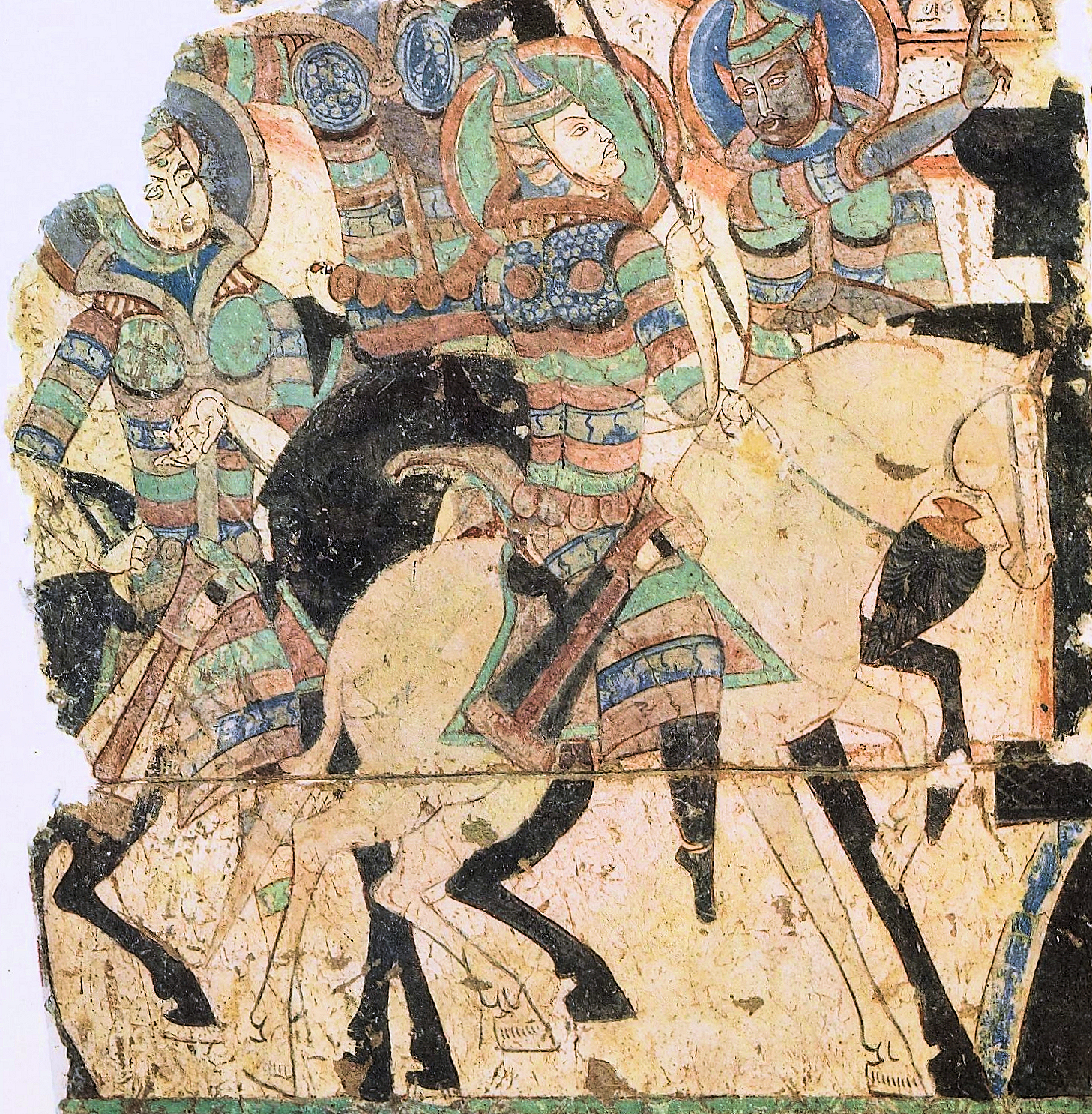
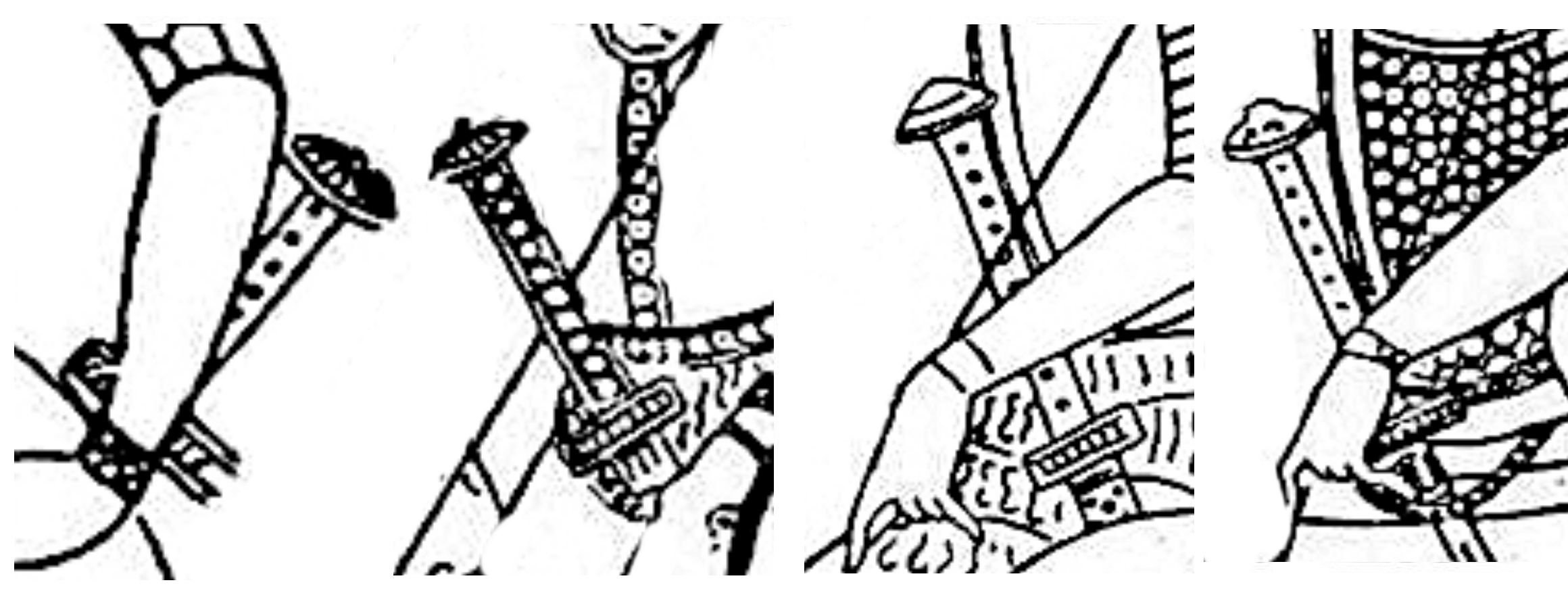
Swords with ornate cloisonné designs, found in the paintings of the Kizil Caves, may be versions of daggers produced under Hephthalite influence. The sword guards of the knights ( ) depicted in the "Cave of the Painters" at Kizil have typical Hunnish designs of rectangle or oval shapes with cloisonné ornamentation, and are dated to the 5th century CE.

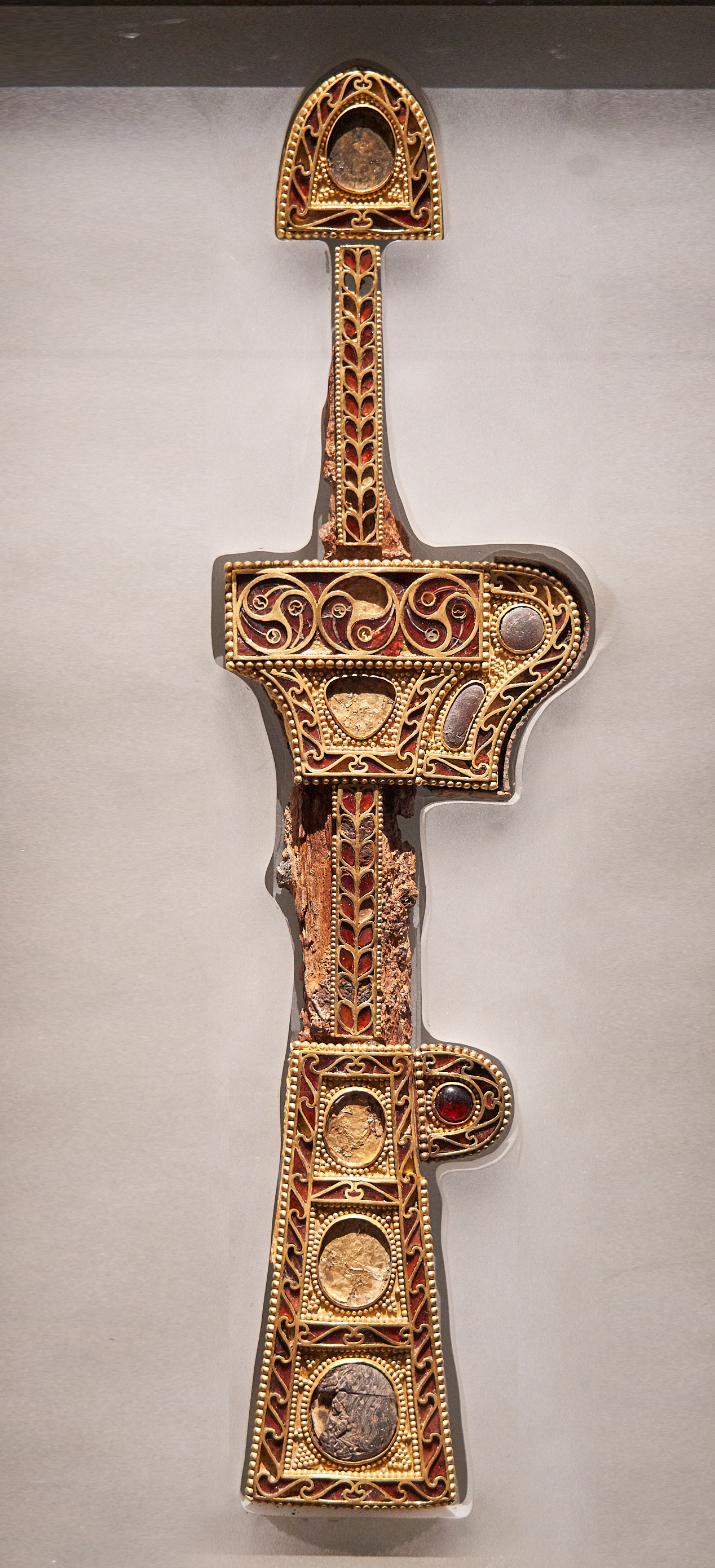
Gyerim-ro dagger

The Hephthalites were considered to be a powerful military force. Depending on sources, their main weapon was the bow, the mace or the sword. The Chinese considered them excellent archers. Judging from their military achievements, they probably had a strong cavalry. In Persia, according to the 6th-century Armenian chronicler Lazar Parpetsi:

Even in time of peace the mere sight or mention of a Hephthalite terrified everybody, and there was no question of going to war openly against one, for everybody remembered all too clearly the calamities and defeats inflicted by the Hephthalites on the king of the Aryans and on the Persians.

"Hunnic" designs in weaponry are known to have influenced Sasanian designs during the 6th–7th century CE, just before the Islamic invasions. The Sasanians adopted Hunnish nomadic designs for straight iron swords and their gold-covered scabbards. This is particularly the case of two-straps suspension design, in which straps of different lengths were attached to a P-shaped projection on the scabbard, so that the sword could be held sideways, making it easier to draw, especially when on horseback. The two-point suspension system for swords is considered to have been introduced by the Hephthalites in Central Asia and in the Sasanian Empire and is a marker of their influence, and the design was generally introduced by them in the territories they controlled. The first example of two-suspension sword in Sasanian art occurs in a relief of Taq-i Bustan dated to the time of Khusro II (590–628 CE), and is thought to have been adopted from the Hepthalites.

Swords with ornate cloisonné designs and two-straps suspensions, as found in the paintings of Penjikent and Kizil and in archaeological excavations, may be versions of the daggers produced under Hephthalite influence. Weapons with Hunnic designs are depicted in the "Cave of the Painters" in the Kizil Caves, in a mural showing armoured warriors and dated to the 5th century CE. Their sword guards have typical Hunnish designs of rectangle or oval shapes with cloisonné ornamentation. The Gyerim-ro dagger, found in a tomb in Korea, is a 5-6th century highly decorated dagger and scabbard of "Hunnic" two-straps suspension design, introduced by the Hephthalites in Central Asia. The Gyerim-ro dagger is thought to have reached Korea either through trade or as a diplomatic gift.

Lamellar helmets were also popularized by the steppe nomads, and were adopted by the Sasanian Empire when they took control of former Hephthalite territory. This type of helmet appears in sculptures on pillar capitals at Ṭāq-e Bostān and Behistun, and on the Anahita coinage of Khosrow II (r. 590–628 CE).

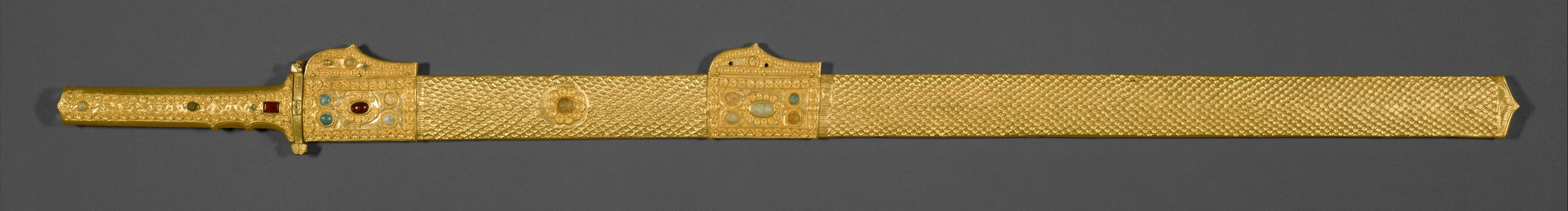
Sasanian sword and scabbard derived from "Hunnic" two-straps suspension designs, Sasanian Empire, 7th century CE.

== Religion and culture ==
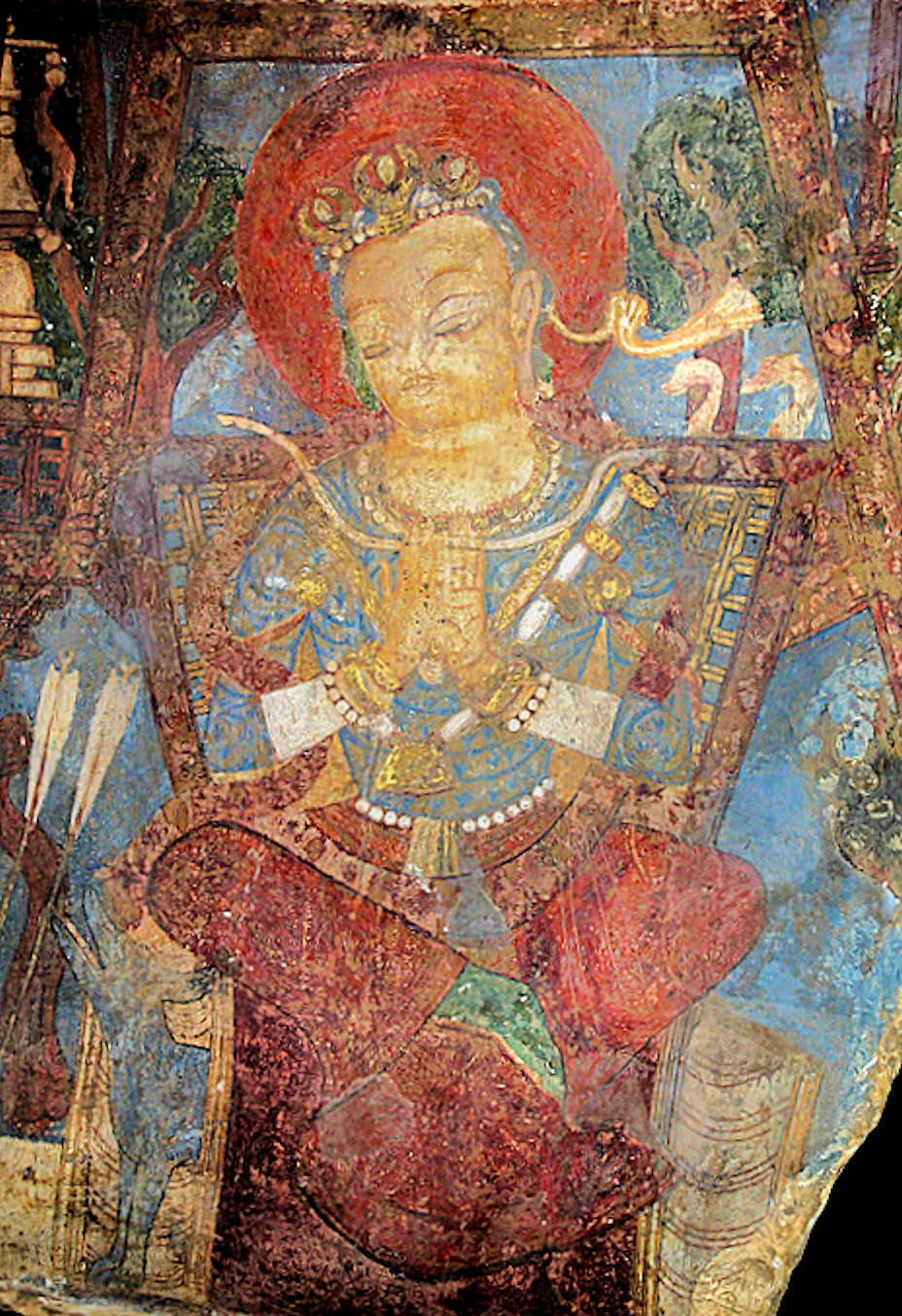
The Buddhist "Hunter King" from Kakrak, a valley next to Bamyan is often presented as a result of Hephthalite influence, especially in reference to the "triple-crescent crown". Wall paintings from the 7th–8th century, Kabul Museum.

Polyandry was the Hephthalites most noteworthy social custom. Brothers had one wife in common and the children were considered as belonging to the oldest brother. The number of ‘horns’ on a married woman’s headdress corresponded to the number of her husbands. They were also said to practice artificial cranial deformation. Chinese sources said they worshiped 'foreign gods', 'demons', the 'heaven god' or the 'fire god'. The Gokturks told the Byzantines that they had walled cities. Some Chinese sources said that they had no cities and lived in tents. Litvinsky tries to resolve this by saying that they were nomads who moved into the cities they had conquered. There were some government officials but central control was weak and local dynasties paid tribute.

According to Song Yun, the Chinese Buddhist monk who visited the Hephthalite territory in 540 and "provides accurate accounts of the people, their clothing, the empresses and court procedures and traditions of the people and he states the Hephthalites did not recognize the Buddhist religion and they preached pseudo gods, and killed animals for their meat." It is reported that some Hephthalites often destroyed Buddhist monasteries but these were rebuilt by others. According to Xuanzang, the third Chinese pilgrim who visited the same areas as Song Yun about 100 years later, the capital of Chaghaniyan had five monasteries.

Although Song Yun states that the Hephthalites did not believe in Buddhism, Buddhist religious establishments flourished in Tokharistan and other areas. In India, however, the Hephthalites showed intolerance towards Buddhist religious establishments.

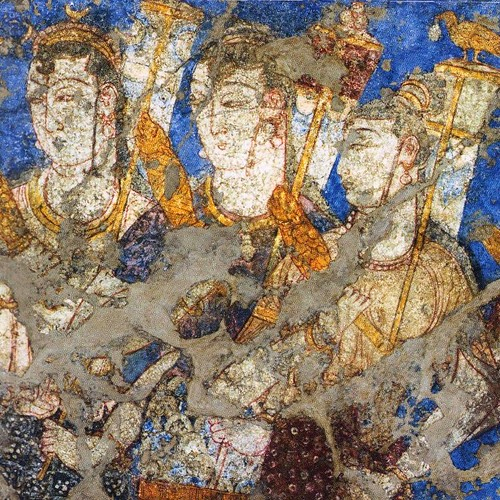
The triple-crescent crown in this Penjikent mural (top left corner), is considered as a Hephthalite marker. 7th-early 8th century.

According to historian André Wink, "...in the Hephthalite dominion Buddhism was predominant but there was also a religious sediment of Zoroastrianism and Manichaeism." Balkh had some 100 Buddhist monasteries and 30,000 monks. Outside the town was a large Buddhist monastery, later known as Naubahar. There were also many adherents of Hindu beliefs in Afghanistan and in Tokharistan.

There were Christians among the Hephthalites by the mid-6th century, although nothing is known of how they were converted. In 549, they sent a delegation to Aba I, the patriarch of the Church of the East, asking him to consecrate a priest chosen by them as their bishop, which the patriarch did. The new bishop then performed obeisance to both the patriarch and the Sasanian king, Khosrow I. The seat of the bishopric is not known, but it may have been Badghis–Qadištan, the bishop of which, Gabriel, sent a delegate to the synod of Patriarch Ishoyahb I in 585. It was probably placed under the metropolitan of Herat. The church's presence among the Hephthalites enabled them to expand their missionary work across the Oxus. In 591, some Hephthalites serving in the army of the rebel Bahram Chobin were captured by Khosrow II and sent to the Roman emperor Maurice as a diplomatic gift. They had Nestorian crosses tattooed on their foreheads.

== Hephthalite seals ==
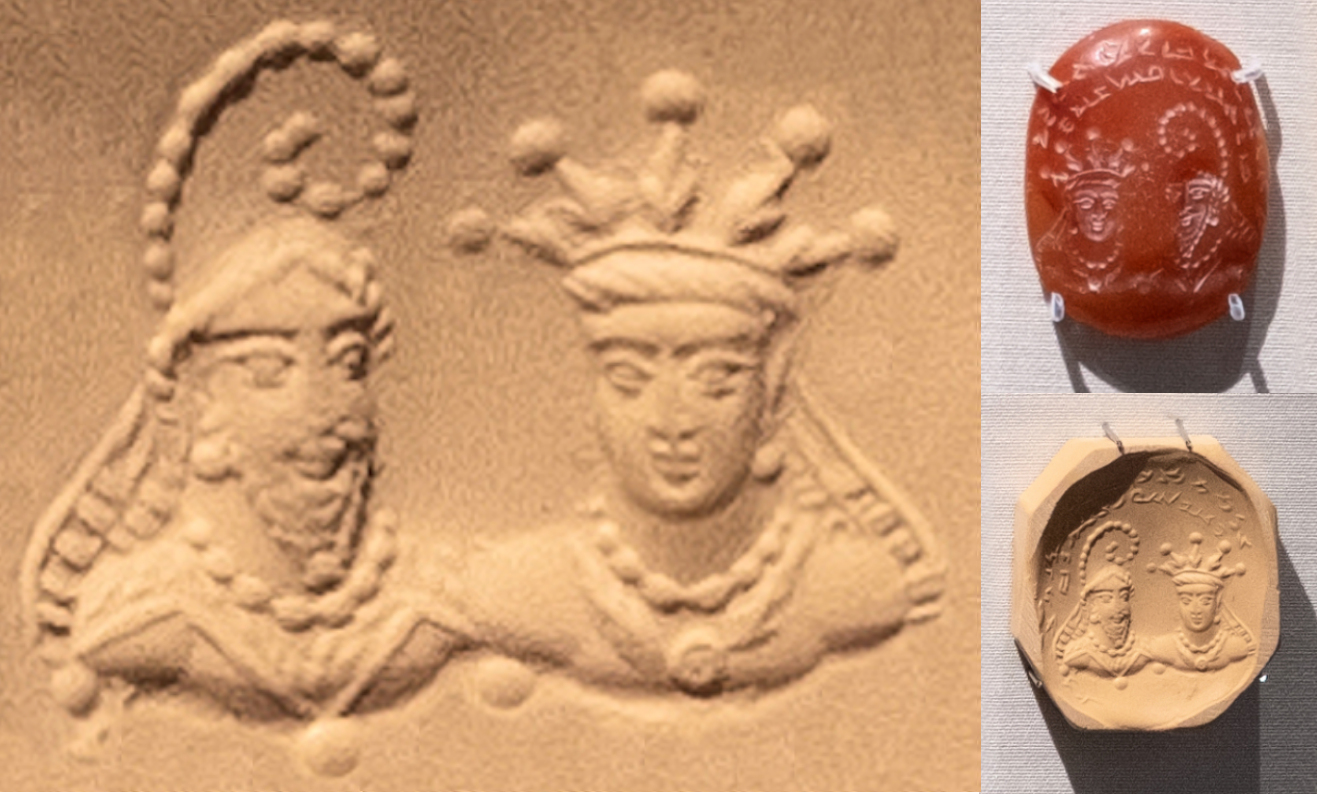
Stamp seal with a bearded figure in Sasanian dress, wearing the kulāf denoting nobility and officials; and a figure with radiate crown, (Note: The radiate crown is comparable to the crown of the king on the "Yabghu of the Hephthalites" seal.) both with royal ribbons. Attributed to the Hephthalites, and recently dated to the 5th–6th century CE. According to earlier sources, Bivar (1969) and Livshits (1969), repeated by the British Museum, the seal was dated to the 300–350 CE. Stamp seal (BM 119999), British Museum.

Several seals found in Bactria and Sogdia have been attributed to the Hephthalites.

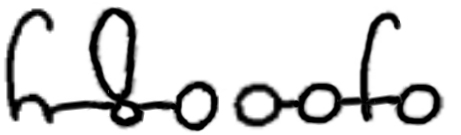
- The "Hephthalite Yabghu seal" shows a Hephthalite ruler with a radiate crown, royal ribbons and a beardless face, with the Bactrian script title "Ebodalo Yabghu" (^{} ηβοδαλο ββγο, "The Lord of the Hephthalites"), and has been dated to the end of the 5th century-early 6th century CE. This important seal was published by Judith A. Lerner and Nicholas Sims-Williams in 2011.
- Stamp seal (BM 119999) in the British Museum shows two facing figures, one bearded and wearing the Sasanian dress, and the other without facial hair and wearing a radiate crown, both being adorned with royal ribbons. This seal was initially dated to 300–350 CE and attributed to the Kushano-Sasanians, but has been more recently attributed to the Hephthalites, and dated to the 5th–6th century CE. Paleographically, the seal can be attributed to the 4th century or first half of the 5th century.
- The "Seal of Khingila" shows a beardless ruler with radiate crown and royal ribbons, wearing a single-lapel caftan, in the name of Eškiŋgil (εϸχιγγιλο), which could correspond to one of the rulers named Khingila (χιγγιλο), or may be a Hunnic title meaning "Companion of the Sword", or even "Companion of the God of War".

=== Other inscriptions ===
Besides coin and seal legends, a few Hephthalite inscriptions, using their alphabet derived from the Greek alphabet, are also known from Buddhist texts, handwritten documents from Mount Mug, as well as inscriptions in Zang-Tepe near Termez, Kara-Tepe in the north-west of the settlement of Old Termez, Afrasiab (near Samarkand), the Buddhist monastery of Kafir-kala and Dalverzin-tepe, or rock inscriptions in Uruz-gan (northwest of Kandahar), and stone inscriptions of the Tochi river valley (northwestern Pakistan).

== Local populations under the Hephthalites ==
The Hephthalites governed a confederation of various people, many of whom were probably of Iranian descent, speaking an Iranian language. Several cities, such as Balkh, Kobadiyan and possibly Samarkand, were allowed to send regional embassies to China while under Hephthalite control. Several portraits of regional ambassadors from the territories occupied by the Hephthalites (Tokharistan, Tarim Basin) are known from Chinese paintings such as the Portraits of Periodical Offering of Liang, originally painted in 526–539 CE. They were at that time under the overlordship of the Hephthalites, who led the embassies to the Southern Liang court in the early 6th century CE. A century later, under the Tang dynasty, portraits of the local people of Tokharistan were again illustrated in The Gathering of Kings, circa 650 CE. Etienne de la Vaissière has estimated the local population of each major oasis in Tokharistan and Western Turkestan during the period to around several hundreds of thousands each, while the major oasis of the Tarim Basin are more likely to have had populations ranging in the tens of thousands each.

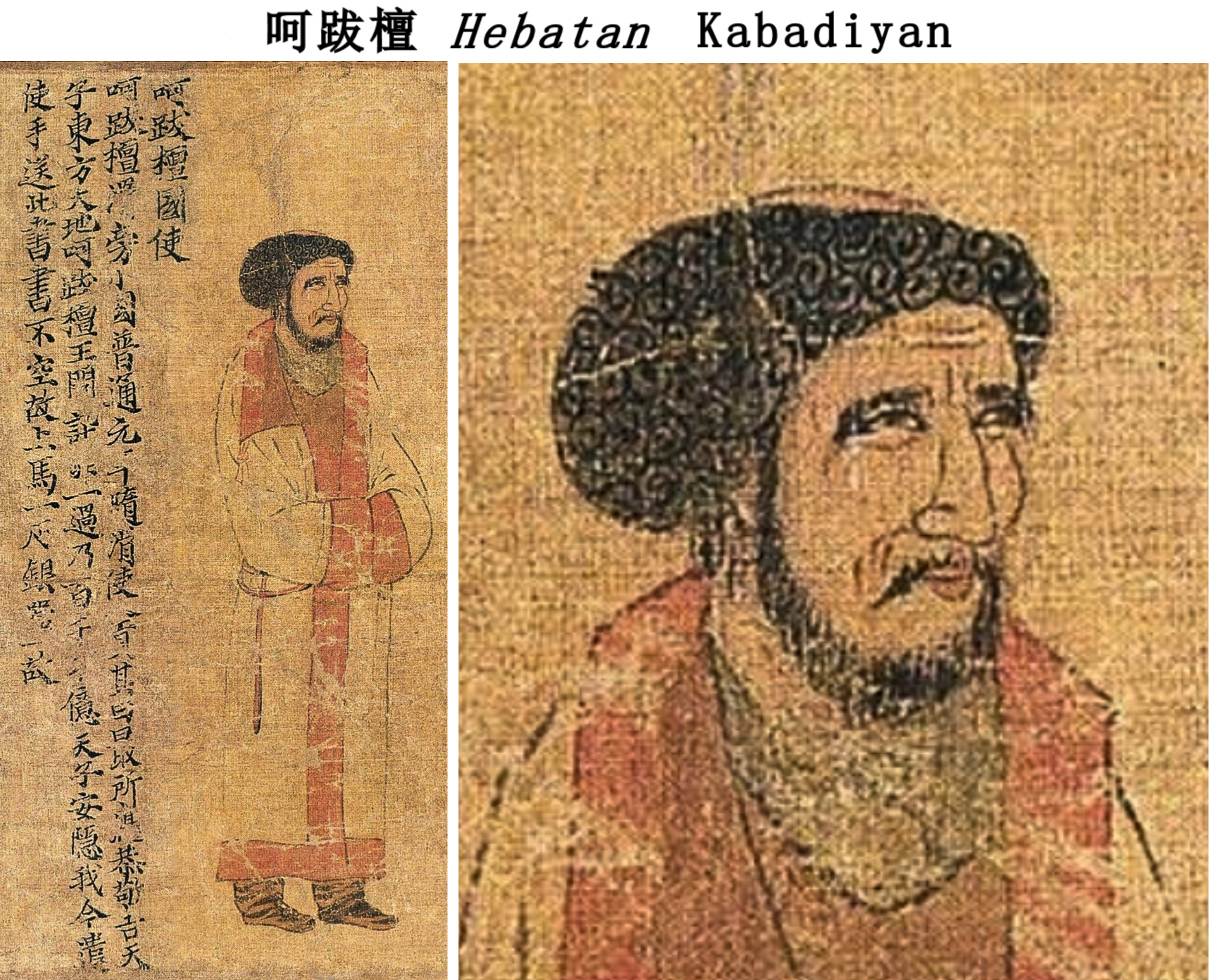
Kabadiyan ambassador to the Chinese court of Emperor Yuan of Liang in his capital Jingzhou in 516–520 CE. Portraits of Periodical Offering of Liang, 11th century Song copy. He accompanied the Hephthalite ambassador to China.

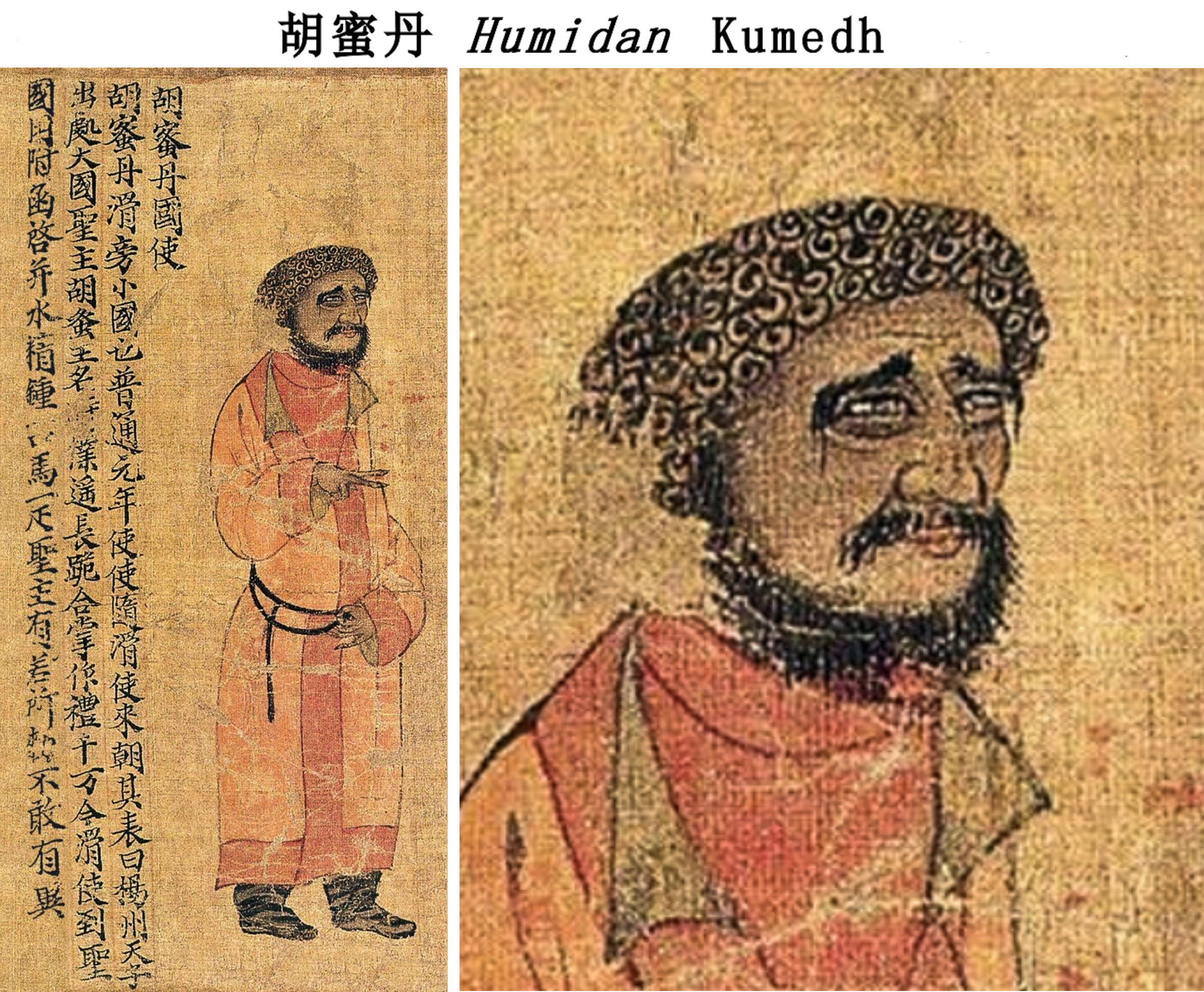
Kumedh ambassador to the Chinese court of Emperor Yuan of Liang in his capital Jingzhou in 516–520 CE. Portraits of Periodical Offering of Liang, 11th century Song copy.

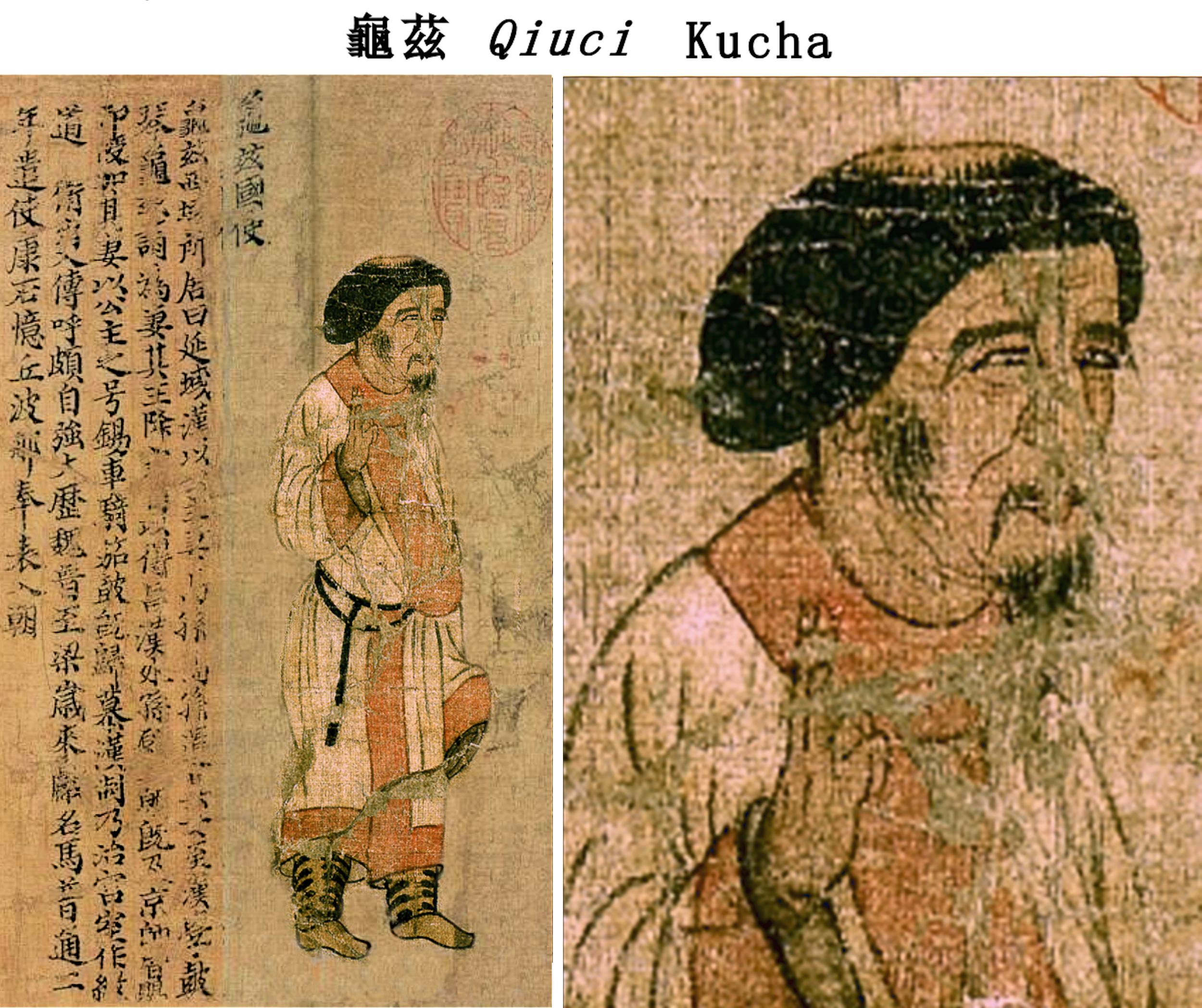
Ambassador from Kucha (龜茲國 Qiuci-guo), one of the main Tocharian cities in the Tarim Basin, visiting the Chinese Southern Liang court in Jingzhou circa 516–520 CE. Portraits of Periodical Offering of Liang, 11th century Song copy.

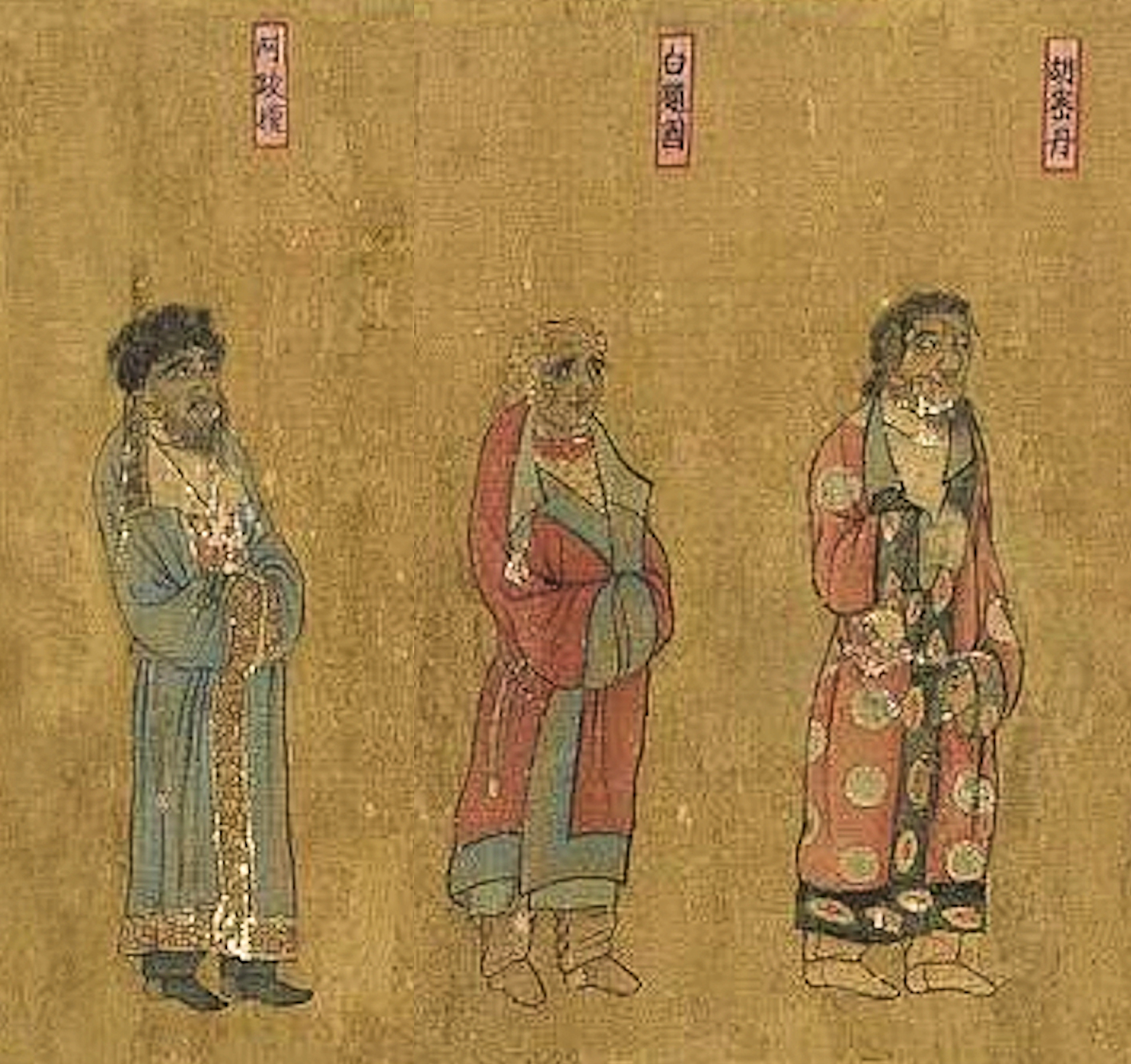
Ambassadors from Kabadiyan (阿跋檀), Balkh (白題國) and Kumedh (胡密丹), visiting the court of the Tang dynasty. The Gathering of Kings (王会图), circa 650 CE

== Alchon Huns ==
Find spots of epigraphic inscriptions (red dots) indicating local control by the Alchon Huns in India between 500–530 CE.

The Alchon Huns, who invaded northern India and were known there as "Hūṇas", have long been considered as a part or a sub-division of the Hephthalites, or as their eastern branch, but now tend to be considered as a separate entity, who may have been displaced by the settlement of the Hephthalites in Bactria. Historians such as Beckwith, referring to Étienne de la Vaissière, say that the Hephthalites were not necessarily one and the same as the Hunas (Sveta Huna). According to de la Vaissiere, the Hephthalites are not directly identified in classical sources alongside that of the Hunas. They were initially based in the Oxus basin in Central Asia and established their control over Gandhara in the northwestern part of the Indian subcontinent by about 465 CE. From there, they fanned out into various parts of northern, western, and central India.

In India, these invading people were called Hunas, or "Sveta Huna" (White Huns) in Sanskrit. The Hūṇas are mentioned in several ancient texts such as the Rāmāyaṇa, Mahābhārata, Purāṇas, and Kalidasa's Raghuvaṃśa. The first Hunas, probably Kidarites, were initially defeated by Emperor Skandagupta of the Gupta Empire in the 5th century CE. In the early 6th century CE, the Alchon Hun Hunas in turn overran the part of the Gupta Empire that was to their southeast and had conquered Central and North India. Gupta Emperor Bhanugupta defeated the Hunas under Toramana in 510, and his son Mihirakula was repulsed by Yashodharman in 528 CE. The Hunas were driven out of India by the kings Yasodharman and Narasimhagupta, during the early 6th century.

== Possible descendants ==
A number of groups may have descended from the Hephthalites.

- Avars: suggestions have been made that the Pannonian Avars were Hepthalites who went to Europe after their collapse in 557 CE, but this is not adequately supported by archaeological or written sources.
- Rajputs: A number of early historians associated the emergence of Rajput polities with the political realignments that followed the decline of Gupta authority and the incursions of groups identified in Indian sources as Hunas, often linked to the Hephthalites or White Huns. James Tod connected several Rajput clans with peoples who entered northwestern India during this period, emphasizing continuity in martial leadership and ruling lineages rather than sudden population replacement. Vincent A. Smith similarly noted that Huna groups were gradually assimilated into the ruling elites of early medieval north India, contributing to the formation of Rajput dynasties in the post-Gupta period. Later scholarship has treated many Rajput genealogical traditions with caution, noting that several clan origin narratives were systematized relatively late and often served to legitimize political authority. Historians such as Romila Thapar and B. D. Chattopadhyaya have emphasized that Rajput identities crystallized through processes of social mobility, elite consolidation, and the incorporation of diverse lineages into a shared kshatriya framework rather than through a single, continuous ethnic descent. Within this context, some historians have discussed clans such as the Tomaras, Chauhans, Guhilots, Parmaras, Varahas, Pratiharas, and related lineages in connection with early medieval power formations in regions affected by Huna activity, while stressing that their recorded genealogies are often late, schematic, and shaped by retrospective legitimation rather than contemporary documentation.
- Chauhans:One of the major Rajput clan, Several historians and genetic findings have suggested that the Chauhans (Chahamanas) may descend from the Huns, particularly the Hephthalites (White Huns), who established political dominance in north-western India during the 5th–6th centuries CE.James Tod regarded the Chauhans as one of the Rajput clans that emerged from foreign warrior groups assimilated into the Indian Kshatriya fold following the decline of Hunnic power. He explicitly classified the Chauhans among the Scythic–Hunnic races that settled in Rajasthan after the collapse of the Huna confederacy. Vincent A. Smith similarly noted that several Rajput dynasties, including the Chauhans, rose to prominence only after the Hunnic invasions, inheriting military territories and political structures formerly controlled by the Huns. He considered the Rajputs to be, at least in part, descendants of Hunnic and Central Asian warrior elites absorbed into Indian society. The Chauhans’ traditional association with solar and warrior deities has also been interpreted as consistent with Hunnic religious traditions, which emphasized celestial worship and martial divinities. The clan name itself has been compared with Central Asian and European ethnonyms, including the medieval Hungarian family name Csóhán, which some Hungarian historians have linked to Hunnic ancestry, suggesting a possible shared onomastic origin.

Genetic studies further support a potential Hunnic contribution to Chauhan ancestry. Y-chromosome haplogroup Q1b, commonly associated with Central Asian and Hunnic populations, has been reported in Rajput groups traditionally identified as Chauhan, Parmar, and Varaha. Additionally, Sengupta et al. documented the presence of haplogroup O3e in an unidentified Rajasthan Rajput sample, a lineage otherwise rare in Indo-Aryan populations but observed among Inner Asian groups historically linked with the Huns. Taken together, historical testimony, clan traditions, name correspondences, and genetic evidence indicate that the Chauhans are among the strongest candidates for partial descent from the Huns, particularly the Hephthalites, who left a significant paternal legacy among Rajput lineages.

More recent genetic studies have occasionally identified Central and Inner Asian-associated Y-chromosomal haplogroups among individuals from Rajput-designated samples, findings that some researchers consider broadly compatible with historical models of elite-level assimilation rather than large-scale population replacement.

- Pashtuns: Though they may not be as compatible as their Rajput counterparts for being descent of the Hephthalites, The Hephthalites may have contributed to the ethnogenesis of Pashtuns. Yu. V. Gankovsky, a Soviet historian on Afghanistan, stated: "Pashtun began as a union of largely East Iranian tribes, which became the initial ethnic stratum of the Pashtun ethnogenesis dating from the middle of the first millennium CE, and is connected with the dissolution of the Hephthalite confederacy." According to The Cambridge History of Iran the descendants of Hephthalites are Pashtuns.
- Khalaj: The Khalaj people are first mentioned in the 7th–9th centuries in the area of Ghazni, Qalati Ghilji, and Zabulistan in present-day Afghanistan. They spoke Khalaj Turkic. Al-Khwarizmi mentioned them as a remnant tribe of the Hephthalites. However, according to linguist Sims-Williams, archaeological documents do not support the suggestion that the Khalaj were the Hephthalites' successors, while according to historian V. Minorsky, the Khalaj were "perhaps only politically associated with the Hephthalites." Some of the Khalaj were later Pashtunized, after which they transformed into the Pashtun Ghilji tribe.
- Kanjina: a Saka tribe linked to the Indo-Iranian Kumijis and incorporated into the Hephthalites. Kanjinas were possibly Turkicized later, as al-Khwarizmi called them "Kanjina Turks". However, Bosworth and Clauson contended that al-Khwarizmi was simply using "Turks" "in the vague and inaccurate sense".
- Karluks: (or Qarlughids) were reported as settled in Ghazni and Zabulistan, present-day Afghanistan, in the thirteenth century. Many Muslim geographers identified "Karluks" Khallukh ~ Kharlukh with "Khalajes" Khalaj from confusion, as the two names were similar and these two groups dwelt near each other.
- Abdal is a name associated with the Hephthalites. It is an alternate name for the Äynu people.
  - According to Orhan Köprülü, Abdal of Turkey might be descended from the Hepthalites. Albert von Le Coq mentions the relation between Abdals of Adana and Äynus of East Turkestan, by them having some common words, and by both referring to themselves as Abdals and speaking an exclusive language among themselves. Some Abdal elements can also be found in the composition of Azerbaijanis, Turkmen (Ata, Chowdur, Ersary, Saryk), Kazakhs, Uzbek-Lokays, Turks and Volga Bulgars (Savirs).

== Hephthalite rulers ==
- Akhshunwar, circa 458 CE
- Kun-khi, circa 484 CE
- Yandai Yilituo, circa 516 CE (only known from his Chinese name 厭帶夷栗陁)
- Hwade-gang (only known from the archives of the Kingdom of Rob).
- Ghadfar/Ghatifar, circa 567–568 CE.
- Faghanish (568-) (ruling in Chaghaniyan)
- Nezak Tarkan (circa 650–710)

== See also ==
- History of Afghanistan
- Huna people
- Kidarites (Red Huns)
- Alchon Huns
- Kushan Empire
- Xionites
- Nezak Huns
- Iranian Huns
- Rajput
- Pratihara dynasty
- Chauhan

== Sources ==
- Adylov, Šuhrat T.; Mirzaahmedov, Jamal K. (2006). On the History of the Ancient Town of Vardāna and the Objavija Feud in Ērān ud Anērān. Studies Presented to B. I. Maršak (1st part). Libreria Editrice Cafoscarina.
- Alram, Michael (2008). "Ein Schatzfund Hephthalitischer Drachmen Aus Baktrien" [A treasure discovery of Hephthalite Drachms from Bactria] (PDF). Numismatische Zeitschrift (in German). Vol. 116/117. pp. 253–268.
- Alram, Michael (2014). "From the Sasanians to the Huns New Numismatic Evidence from the Hindu Kush". The Numismatic Chronicle. 174: 261–291. ISSN 0078-2696. JSTOR 44710198.
- Alram, Michael; Filigenzi, Anna; Kinberger, Michaela; Nell, Daniel; Pfisterer, Matthias; Vondrovec, Klaus (2012–2013). "The Countenance of the other (The Coins of the Huns and Western Turks in Central Asia and India)". Pro.geo.univie.ac.at. Kunsthistorisches Museum Vienna. Archived from the original on 18 August 2021.
- Balogh, Dániel (12 March 2020). Hunnic Peoples in Central and South Asia: Sources for their Origin and History. Barkhuis. ISBN 978-94-93194-01-4.
- Baumer, Christoph (18 April 2018). The History of Central Asia. Bloomsbury Publishing. ISBN 978-1-83860-868-2.. 4-volume set.
- Beckwith, Christopher (2009). Empires of the Silk Road. Princeton University Press.
- Chegini, N.N.; Nikitin, A.V. "Sasanian Iran – Economy, Society, Arts and Crafts". In Litvinsky, Guang-da & Samghabadi (1996), pp. 35–78.
- Dani, A.H.; Litvinsky, B.A.; Zamir Safi, M.H. "Eastern Kushans, Kidarites in Gandhara and Kashmir, and Later Hephthalites". In Litvinsky, Guang-da & Samghabadi (1996), pp. 163–184.
- Decker, Michael J. (2022). The Sasanian Empire at War: Persia, Rome, and the Rise of Islam, 224–651. Westholme Publishing.
- de la Vaissière, Etienne (2012). "5: Central Asia and the Silk Road". In S. F. Johnson (ed.). Oxford Handbook of Late Antiquity. Oxford University Press. pp. 142–169. ISBN 978-0-19-533693-1.
- de la Vaissière, Etienne (2003). "Is There a "Nationality of the Hephtalites"?". Bulletin of the Asia Institute. 17: 119–132. ISSN 0890-4464. JSTOR 24049310.
- Enoki, K. (1959). "On the Nationality of Ephthalites". Memoirs of the Research Department of the Toyo Bunko (PDF). Vol. 18. Tokyo. pp. 1–58. Archived from the original (PDF) on 26 February 2007. Internet Archive copy
- Frye, Richard N. (2002). "Pre-Islamic and early Islamic cultures". In Canfield, Robert L. (ed.). Turko-Persia in Historical Perspective. Cambridge University Press. ISBN 978-0-521-52291-5.
- Gibb, H. A. R. (1923). The Arab Conquests in Central Asia. London: The Royal Asiatic Society.
- Golden, Peter B. (1992). An Introduction to the History of the Turkic People. Turcologica. Vol. 9. Wiesbaden: Otto Harrassowitz.
- Harmatta, J.; Litvinsky, B.A. "Tokharistan and Gandhara Under Western Türk Rule (650–750)". In Litvinsky, Guang-da & Samghabadi (1996), pp. 368–422.
- Härtel, Herbert; Yaldiz, Marianne (1982). Laing, M. E. D. (ed.). Along the Ancient Silk Routes: Central Asian Art from the West Berlin State Museums. Metropolitan Museum of Art. ISBN 978-0-87099-300-8. Internet Archive Google Books
- Ilyasov, Jangar (2001). "The Hephthalite Terracotta". Silk Road Art and Archaeology. 7. Kamakura: 187–200.
- Kageyama, Etsuko (2007). "The Winged Crown and the Triple-crescent Crown in the Sogdian Funerary Monuments from China: Their Relation to the Hephthalite Occupation of Central Asia" (PDF). Journal of Inner Asian Art and Archaeology. 2: 11–22. doi:10.1484/J.JIAAA.2.302540. S2CID 130640638. Archived from the original (PDF) on 11 November 2020.
- Kageyama, Etsuko (2016). "Change of suspension systems of daggers and swords in eastern Eurasia: Its relation to the Hephthalite occupation of Central Asia" (PDF). ZINBUN. 46: 199–212. doi:10.14989/209942. S2CID 130594467.
- Kennedy, Hugh (2007). The Great Arab Conquests: How the Spread of Islam Changed the World We Live In. Philadelphia, Pennsylvania: Da Capo Press. ISBN 978-0-306-81740-3.
- Kurbanov, Aydogdy (2010). The Hephthalites: Archaeological and Historical Analysis (PDF) (PhD). Berlin: Berlin Freie Universität – via Freie Universitat Berlin Repository.
- Kurbanov, Aydogdy (2013). "The Hephthalite Numismatics" (PDF). Tyragetia. 7 (1): 369–380.
- Kurbanov, Aydogdy (2014). "The Hephthalites: Iconographical Materials" (PDF). Tyragetia. 8 (1): 317–334.
- Lerner, Judith A. (2010). Observations on the Typology and Style of Seals and Sealings from Bactria and the Indo-Iranian Borderlands, in Coins, Art and Chronology II. The First Millennium CE in the Indo-Iranian Borderlands. Vienna: ÖAW.
- Lerner, Judith A.; Sims-Williams, Nicholas (2011). Seals, sealings and tokens from Bactria to Gandhara : 4th to 8th century CE. Wien: Verlag der Österreichischen Akademie der Wissenschaften. ISBN 978-3-7001-6897-3.
- Litvinsky, B.A. "The Hephthalite Empire". In Litvinsky, Guang-da & Samghabadi (1996), pp. 135–162.
- Litvinsky, B.A.; Guang-da, Zhang; Samghabadi, R. Shabani, eds. (1996). History of Civilizations of Central Asia. Volume III: The crossroads of civilizations: A.D. 250 to 750. Paris: UNESCO. ISBN 978-92-3-103211-0. Alternate PDF Archived 13 May 2021 at the Wayback Machine
- Maas, Michael (2015). The Cambridge Companion to the Age of Attila. Cambridge University Press. ISBN 978-1-107-02175-4.
- Margottini, Claudio (2013). After the Destruction of Giant Buddha Statues in Bamiyan (Afghanistan) in 2001: A UNESCO's Emergency Activity for the Recovering and Rehabilitation of Cliff and Niches. Springer Science & Business Media. ISBN 978-3-642-30051-6.
- Millward, James A. (2007). Eurasian Crossroads: A History of Xinjiang. Columbia University Press. ISBN 978-0-231-13924-3.
- Naymark, Aleksandr (August 2001). Sogdiana, its Christians, and Byzantium: a Study of Artistic and Cultural Connections in Late Antiquity and Early Middle Ages (Ph.D. Dissertation). Bloomington: Department of Central Eurasian Studies and Department of Art History, Indiana University.
- Rezakhani, Khodadad (2017). ReOrienting the Sasanians: East Iran in Late Antiquity. Edinburgh University Press. ISBN 978-1-4744-0030-5.
- Rezakhani, Khodadad (2017a). "From the Kushans to the Western Turks". In Touraj Daryaee (ed.). King of the Seven Climes: A History of the Ancient Iranian World (3000 BCE - 651 CE). Ancient Iran Series. Vol. IV. ISBN 978-0-692-86440-1.
- Rowland, Benjamin (1974). The Art of Central Asia. New York: Crown. Archived from the original on 15 January 2023. Internet Archive
- Sundermann, Werner; Hintze, Almut; de Blois, François (2009). Exegisti Monumenta: Festschrift in Honour of Nicholas Sims-Williams. Otto Harrassowitz Verlag. ISBN 978-3-447-05937-4.
- Shaban, M. A. (1970). The ʿAbbāsid Revolution. Cambridge: Cambridge University Press. ISBN 0-521-29534-3.
- West, Barbara A. (2009). Encyclopedia of the Peoples of Asia and Oceania. Infobase Publishing. ISBN 978-1-4381-1913-7.
- Yu Taishan (2018). "The Illustration of Envoys Presenting Tribute at the Liang Court". Eurasian Studies. VI: 68–122.
- Zeimal, E.V. (1994). "The Circulation of Coins in Central Asia during the Early Medieval Period (Fifth–Eighth Centuries A.D.)". Bulletin of the Asia Institute. 8: 245–267. ISSN 0890-4464. JSTOR 24048777.
- Zeimal, E.V. "The Kidarite kingdom in Central Asia". In Litvinsky, Guang-da & Samghabadi (1996), pp. 119–134.
