= Archaeological Museum of Termez =

Museum in Termez, Uzbekistan

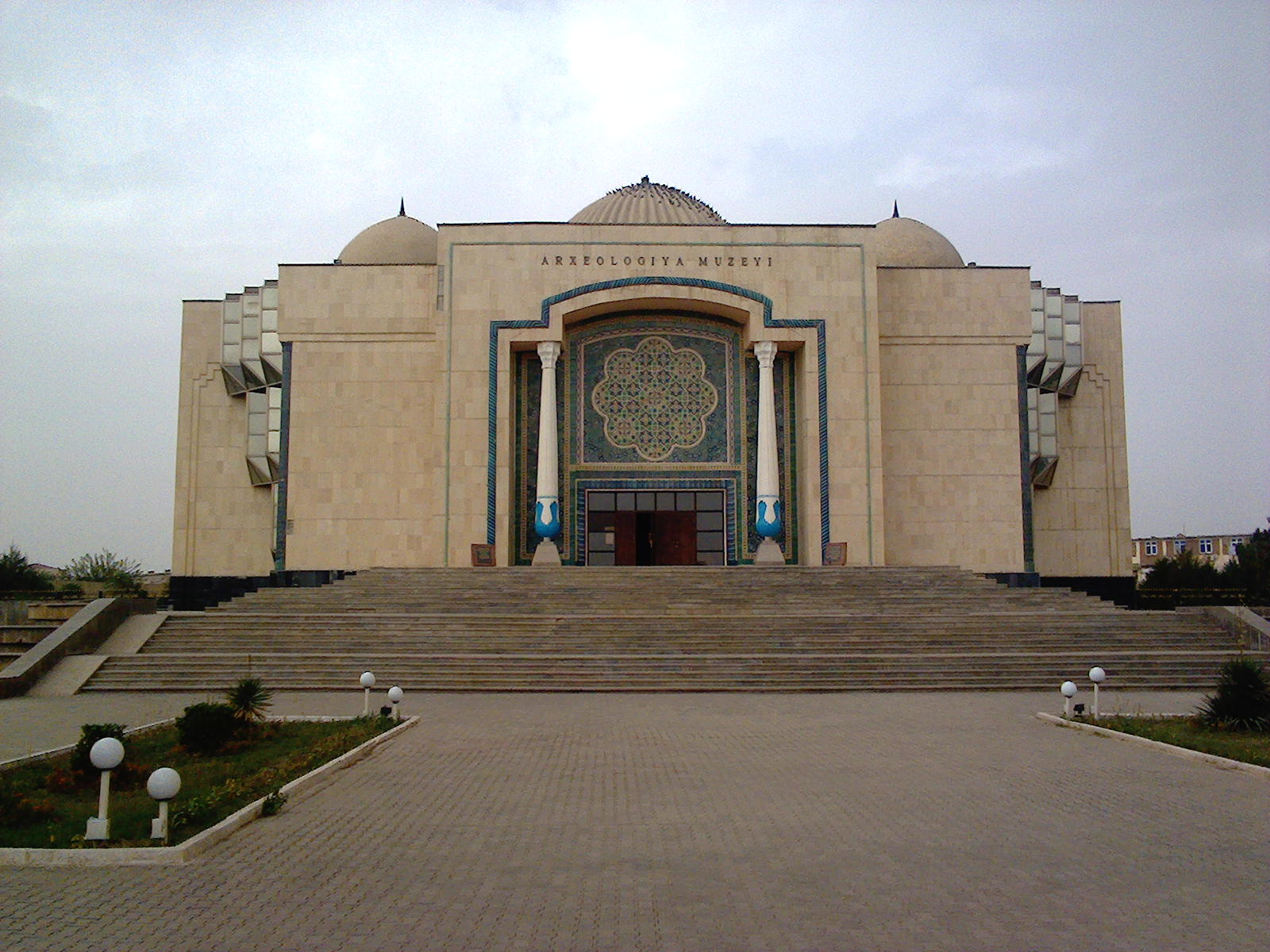

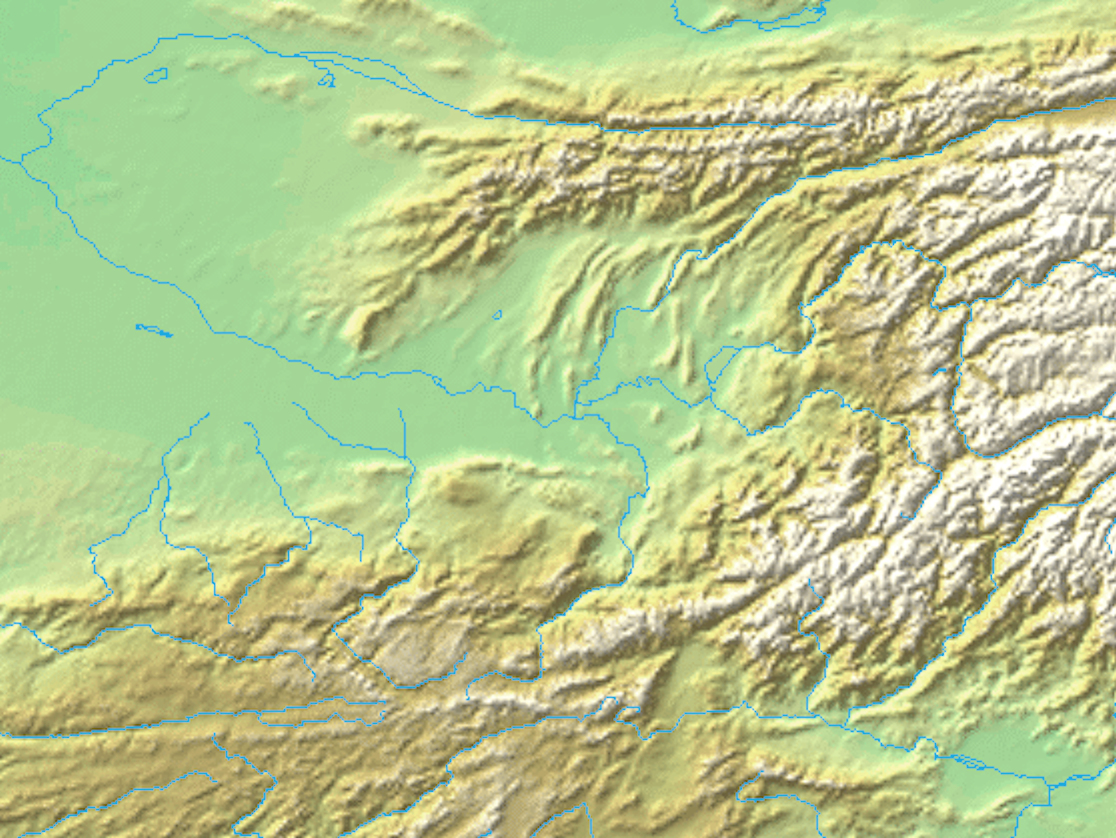
- Location in Bactria Location in West Asia Location in Uzbekistan
- Location: At-Termeziy 29A, Termez, Uzbekistan
- Coordinates: 37.2442°N 67.2828°E

The Archaeological Museum of Termez is a museum in the city of Termez, modern Uzbekistan. The artifacts contained in the museum are mainly linked to the Graeco-Bactrian and Kushan periods. Some artifacts, such as the seated Buddha under the Bodhi tree or head of the Kushan prince are actually copies, the original of which are located in the History Museum of Tashkent and in the Hermitage Museum in Saint-Petersburg.

There are also scale models of the archaeological sites of Salalli Tepe, Kampyr Tepe, Khalchayan, Balalyk Tepe and Fayaz Tepe.

A famous mural, the so-called "Princess of Tokharistan", was found at Tavka Kurgan in Shirabad.

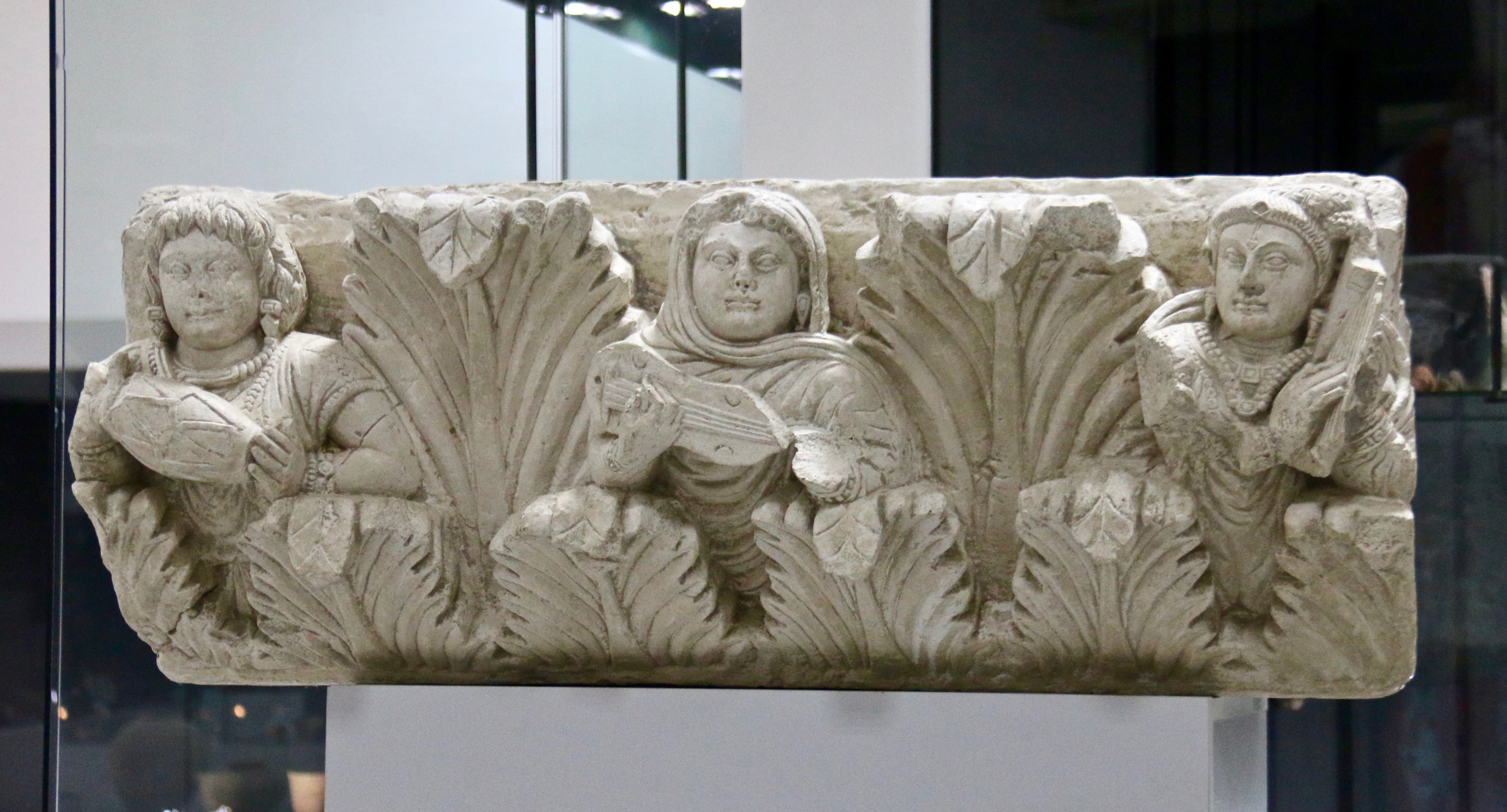
Greco-Buddhist frieze showing musicians, in the style of Gandhara.

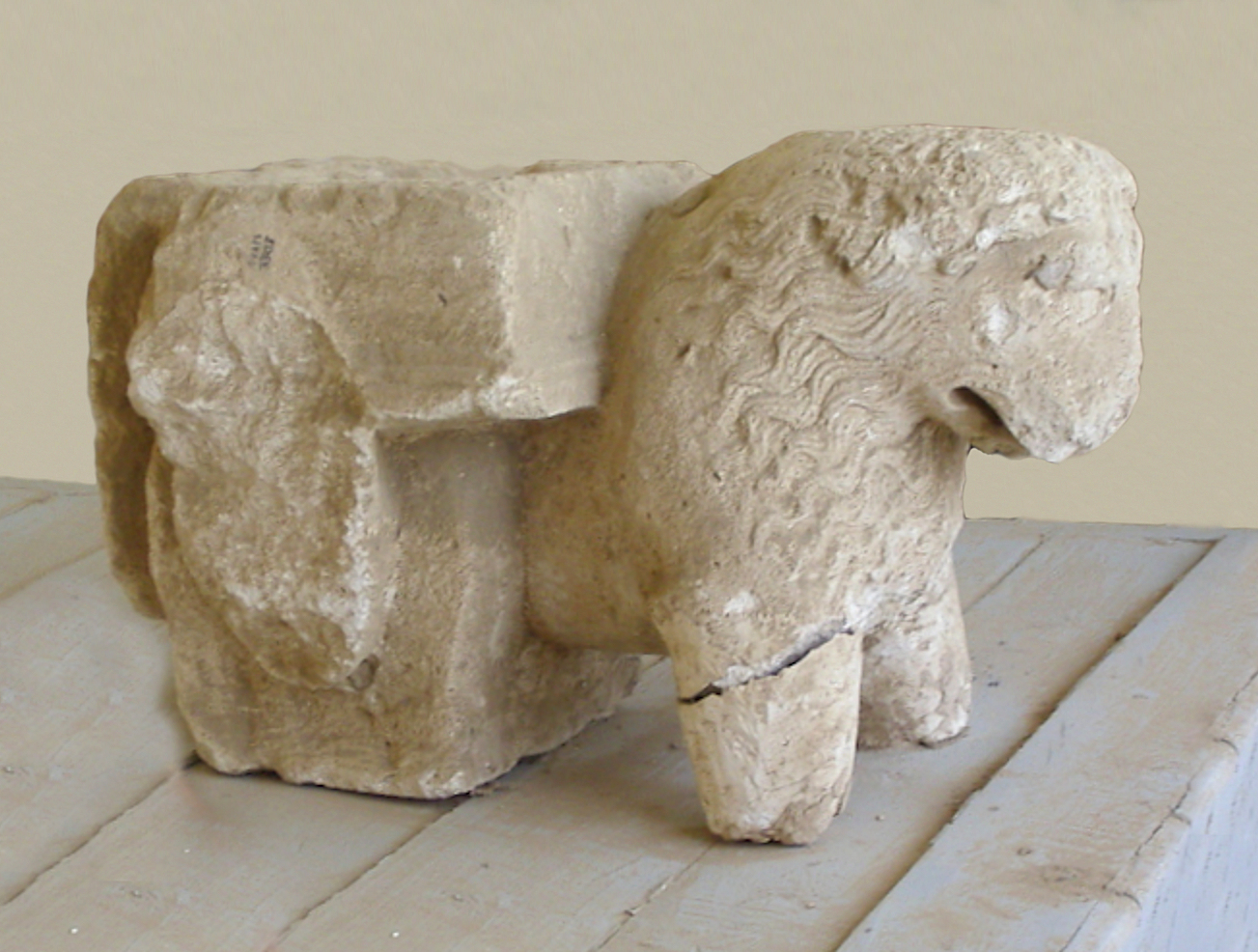
Lion capital

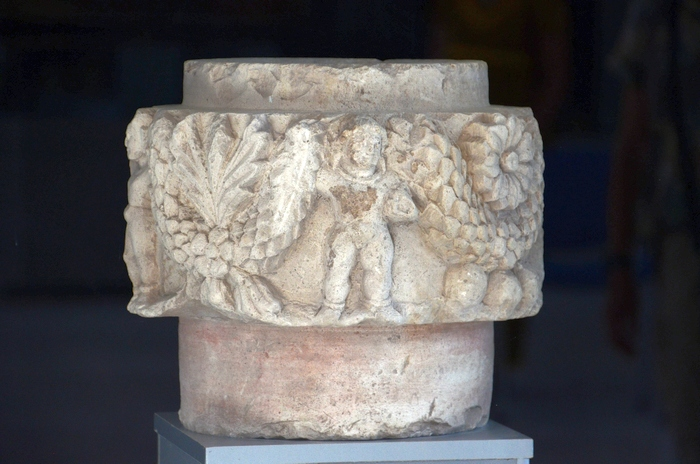
Capital with Classical Garland bearers, 100-200 CE.

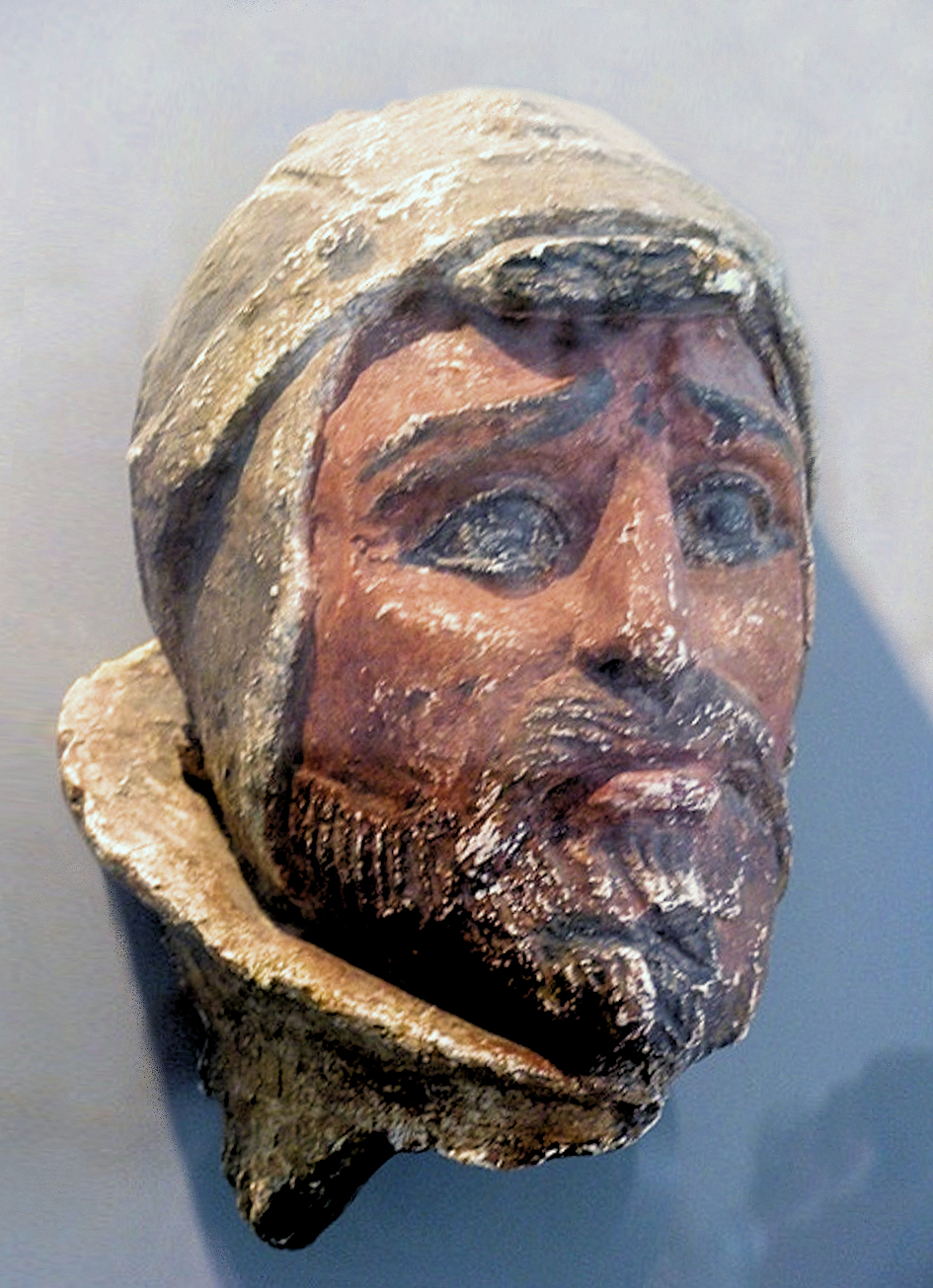
Saka warrior from the site of Khalchayan. Art of the Yuezhi.

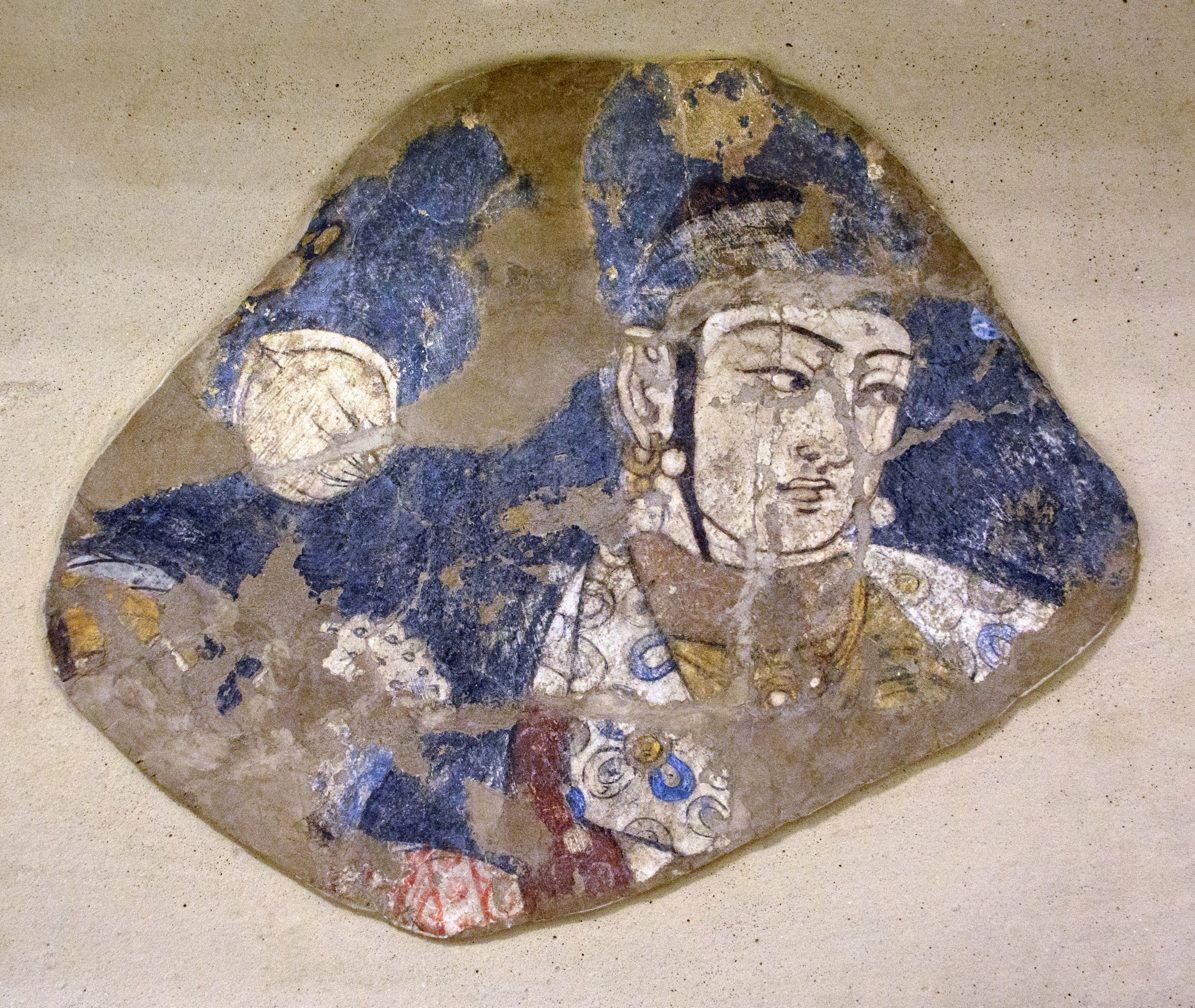
Tavka Kurgan wall painting. 5th-6th century CE.

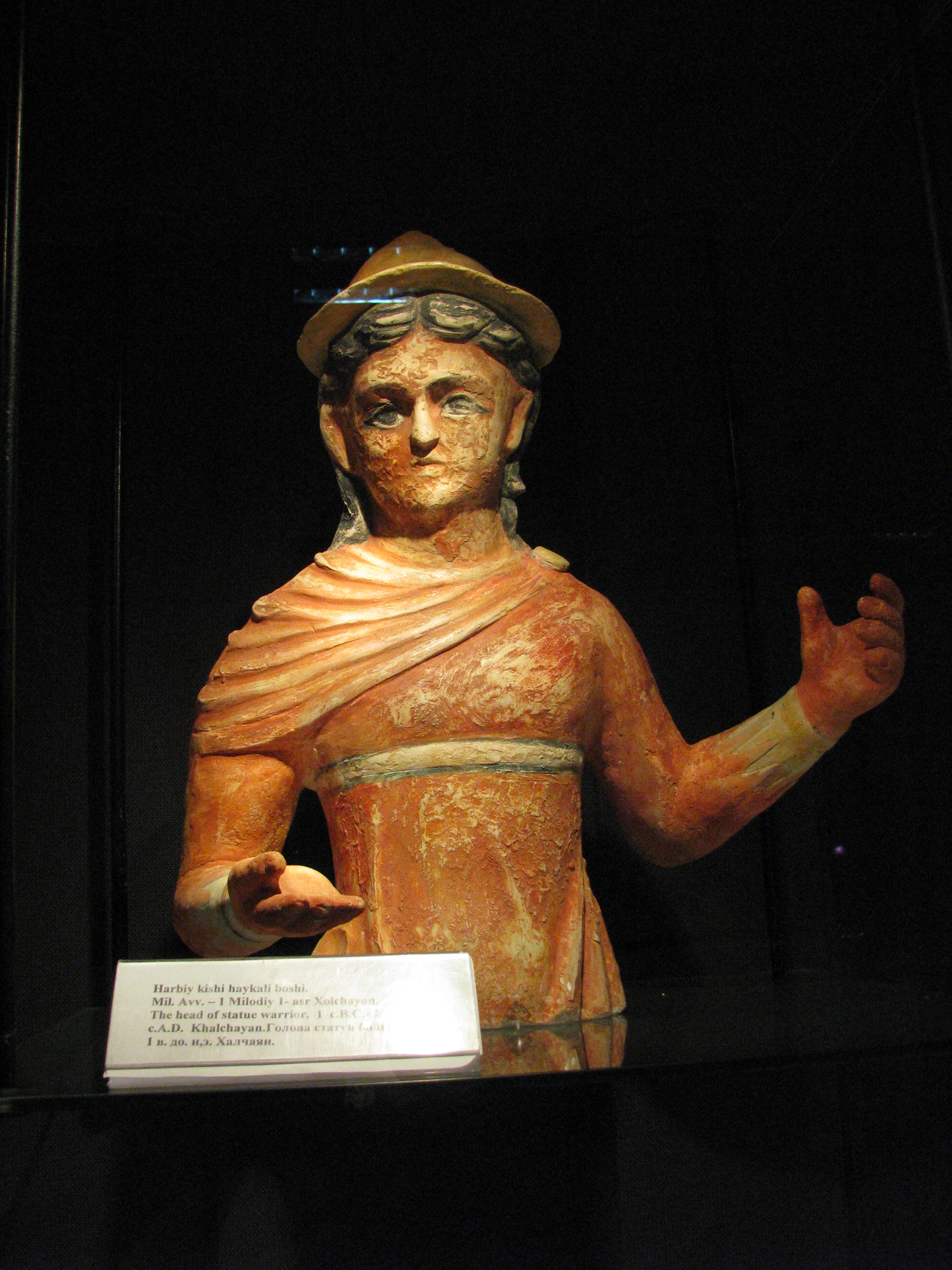
Khalchayan terracotta statue.
