= Kulāf =

Sasanian Empire

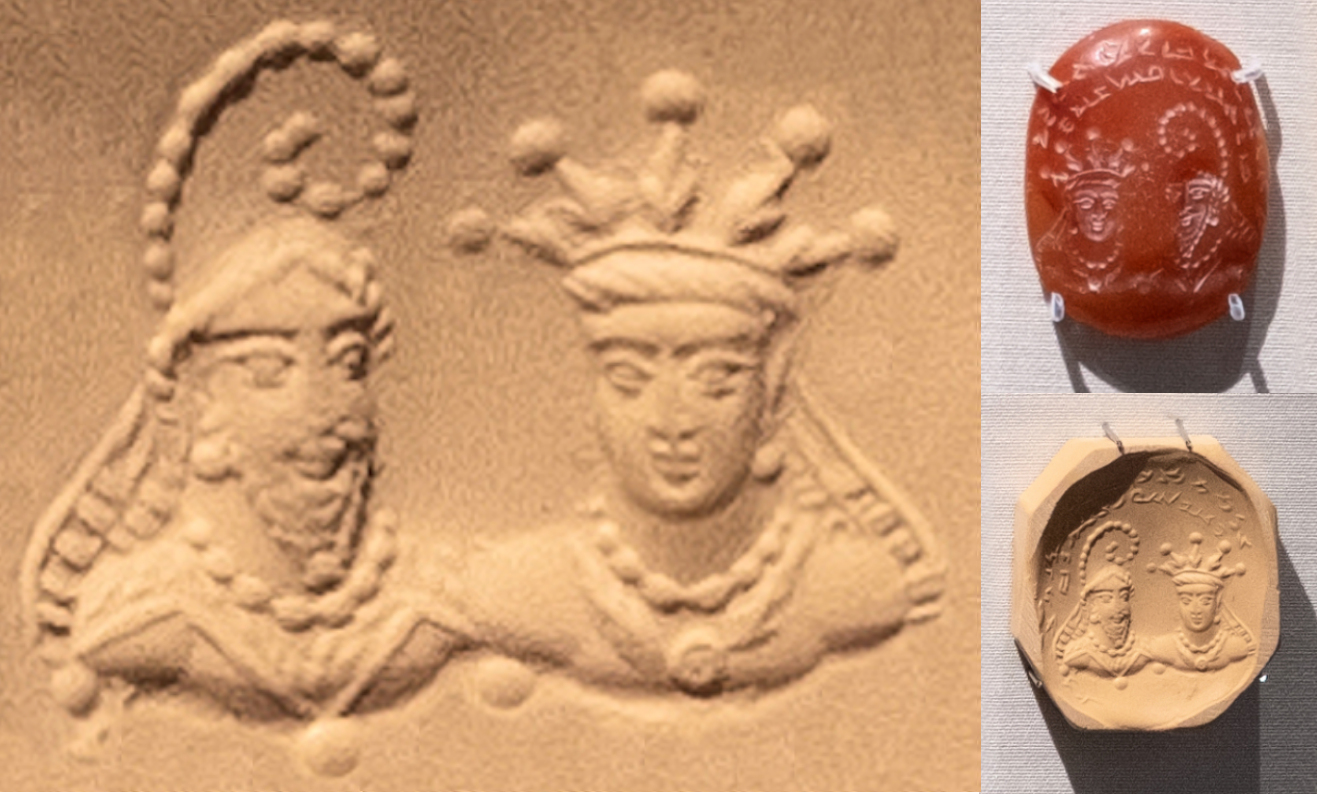
Stamp seal with a bearded figure in Sasanian dress, wearing the kulāf denoting nobility and officials; and a figure with radiate crown, both with royal ribbons. Attributed to the Hephthalites, and recently dated to the 5th-6th century CE. Stamp seal (BM 119999), British Museum.

A kulāf, or kolāh, is a type of cap that designated Sasanian nobility and official. It appears on numerous reliefs and seals of the Sasanian Empire period.

The kulāf is often decorated with pearls, on the edge and on the surface of the cap. It may also be shown with an emblem or tamgha on the surface.

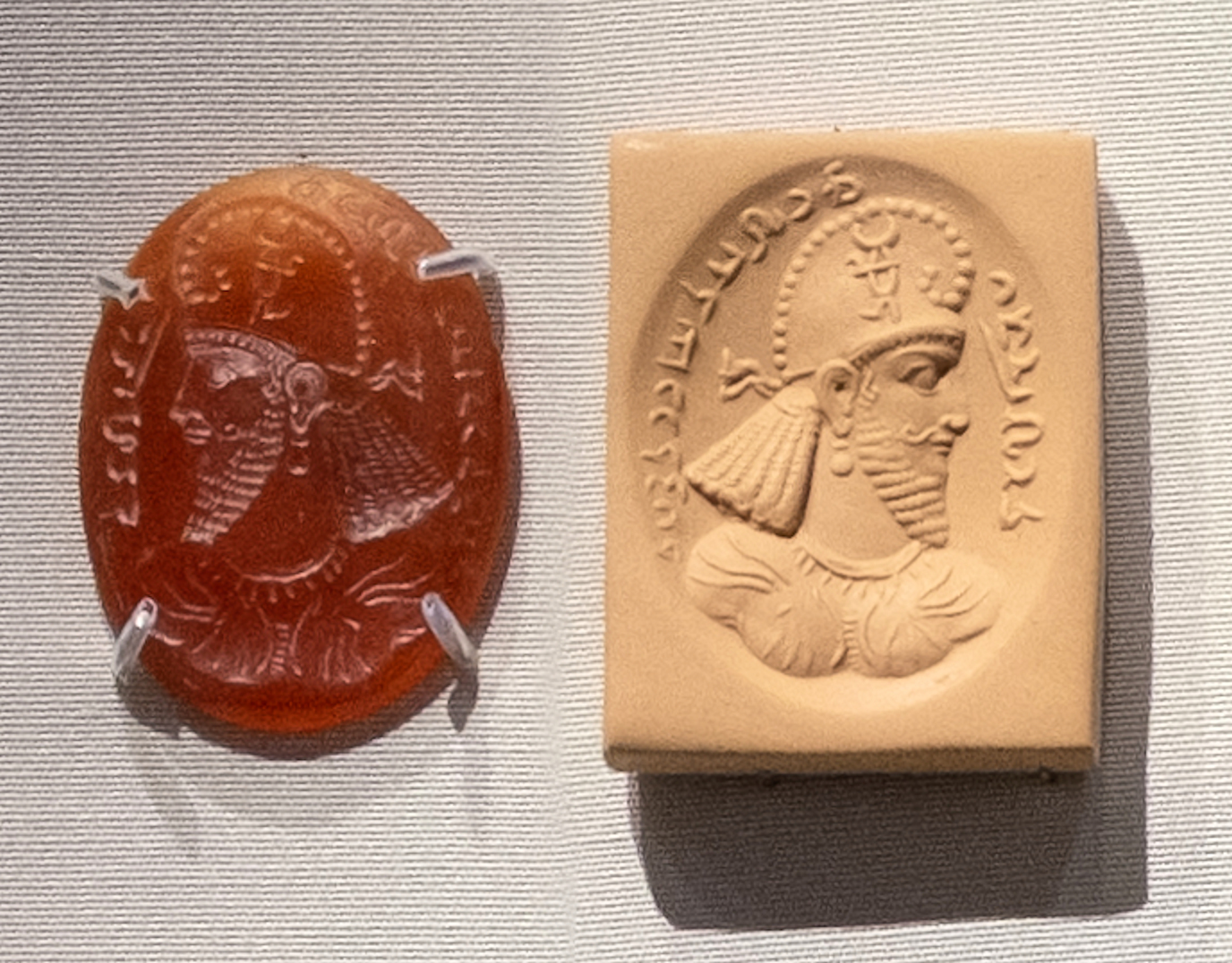
Sasanian seal of an official wearing the kulāf, with Pahlavi inscription "Roz-bud, chief wine-purchaser" (disputed), excavated in Northern Syria. 5th century CE, British Museum, 135071

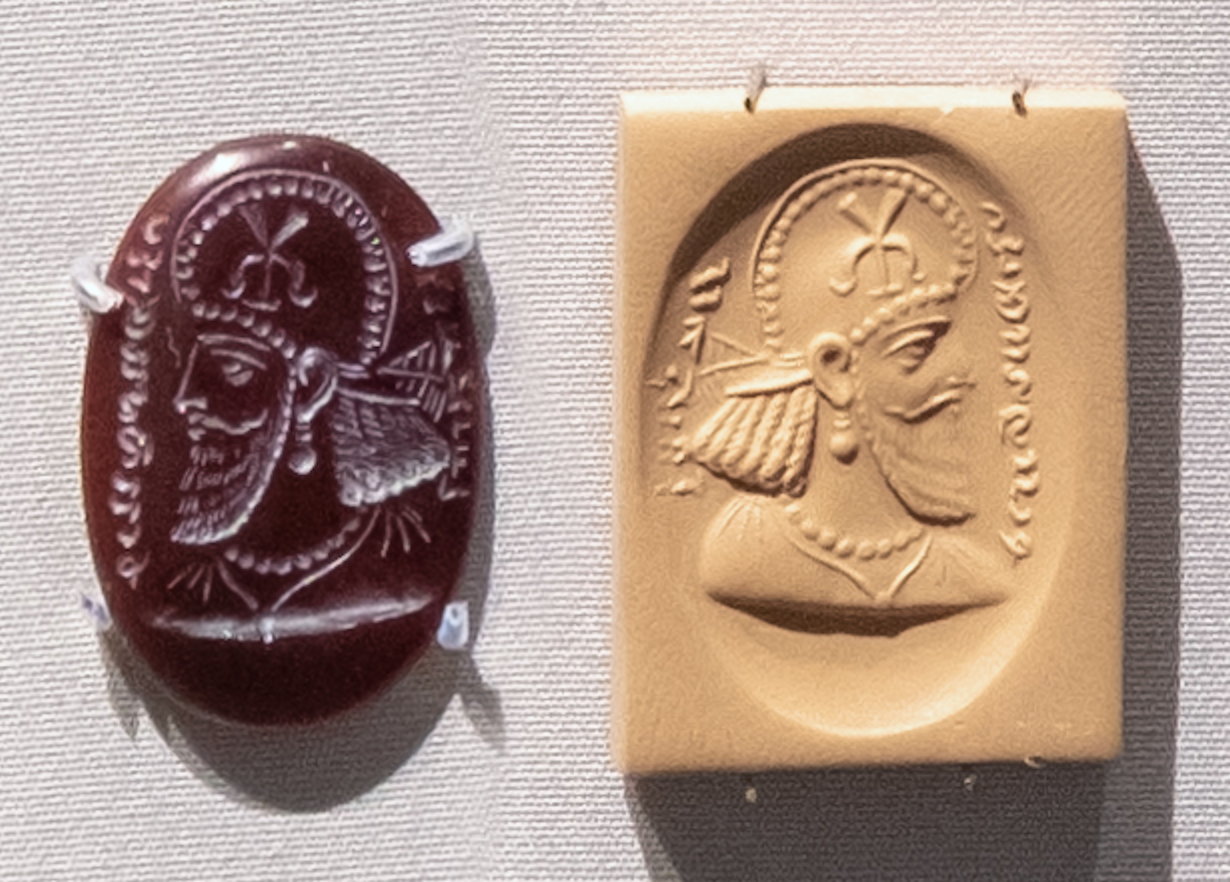
Sasanian seal with portrait of an official wearing the kulāf, inscription in Pahlavi "Perozhormizd, son of the Kanarang". 5th century CE, British Museum, 134847.
