= Tavka Kurgan =

Archaeological site in Uzbekistan

- Tavka Kurgan
- Tavka Kurgan
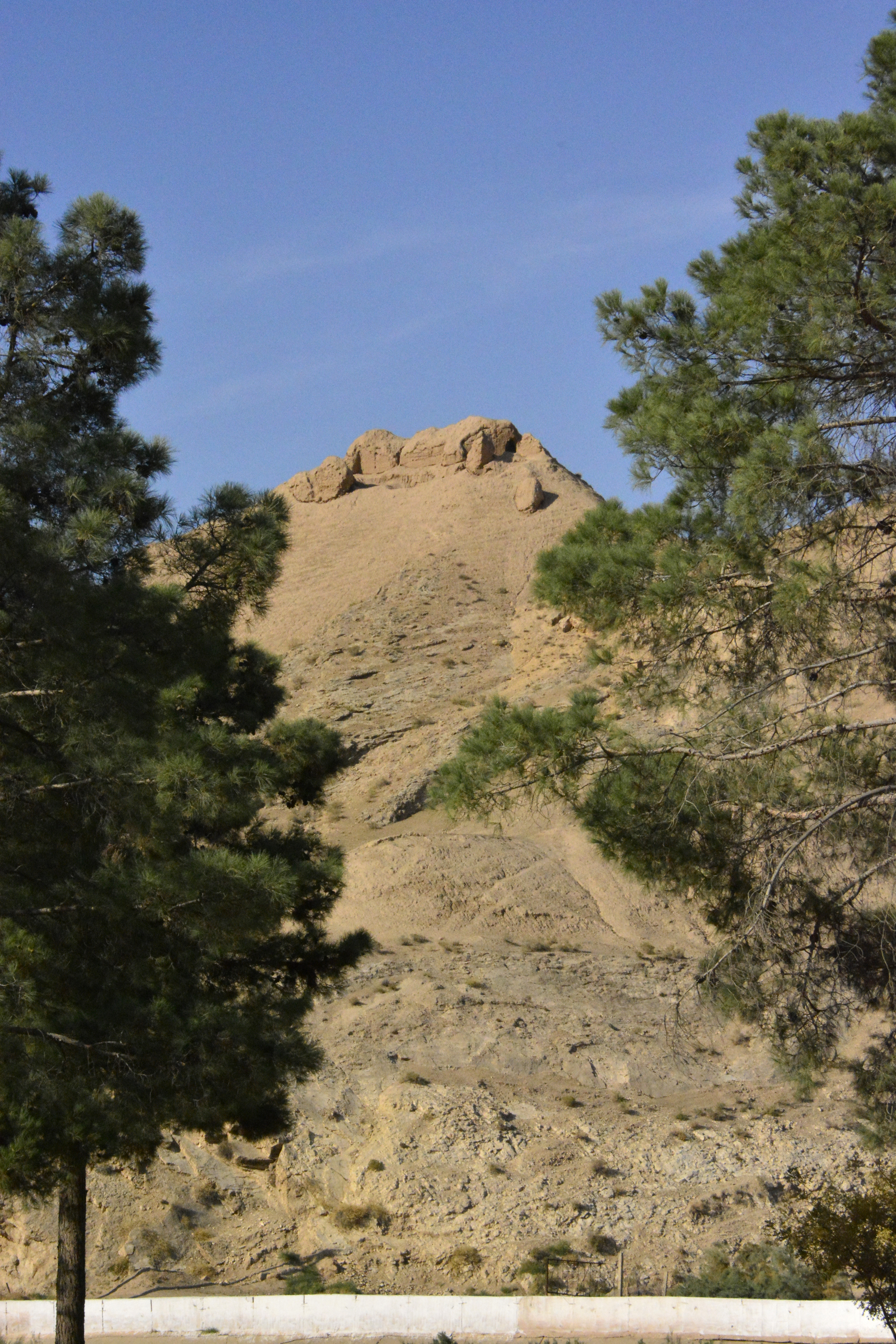
- Fortress of Tavka Kurgan, near Shirabad, Termez. 5th-6th century CE

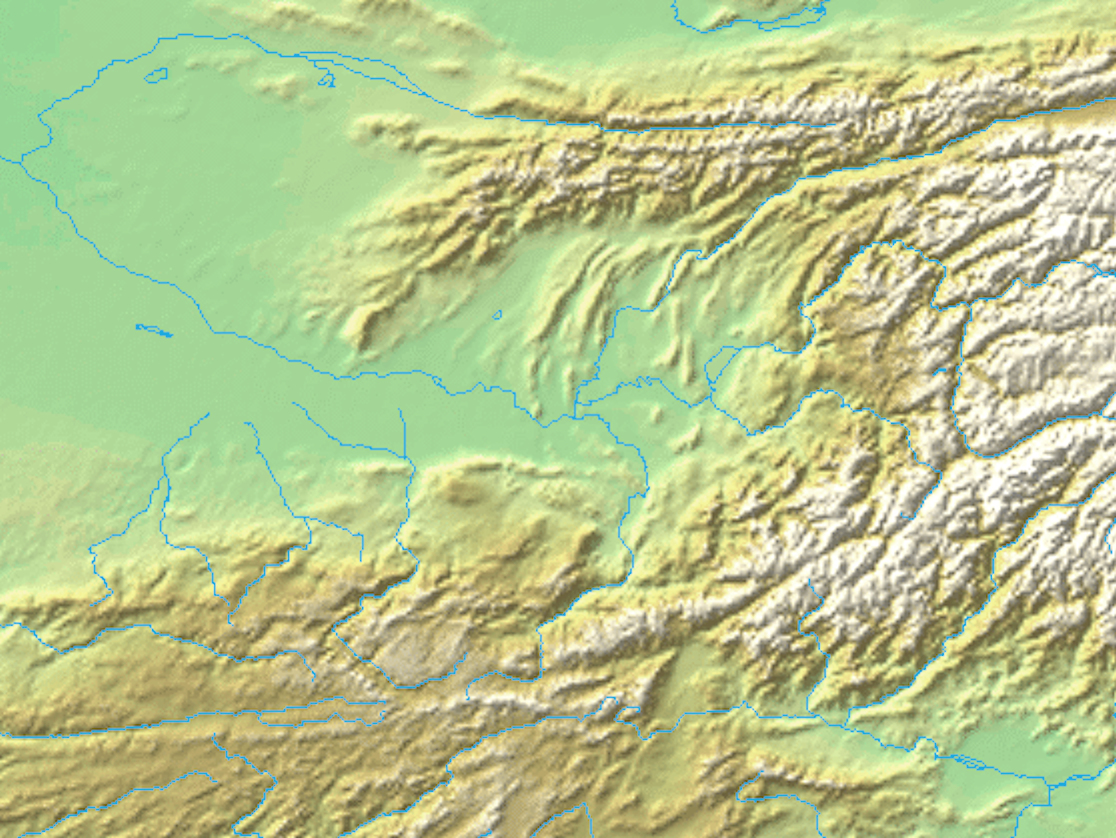
- Location within West and Central Asia Location within Uzbekistan Location within Bactria
- 37°43′01″N 66°59′47″E
- Type: Settlement
- Location: Uzbekistan

Site notes
- Condition: Ruined

Tavka Kurgan is an ancient fortress and archaeological site near Shirabad, Uzbekistan. It is especially famous for some frescoes dated to the 5th-6th century CE, several of them located in the Archaeological Museum of Termez. One of these paintings, the so-called "Princess of Tokharistan", is actually thought to represent a hunter.

The paintings of Tavka Kurgan were excavated by the Uzek archaeologist Šojmardon Raxmanov. They are of very high quality, and are closely related to other paintings of the Tokharistan school such as Balalyk tepe, Adžina-tepe and Kala-i Kafirnigan, in the depiction of clothes, and especially in the treatment of the faces.

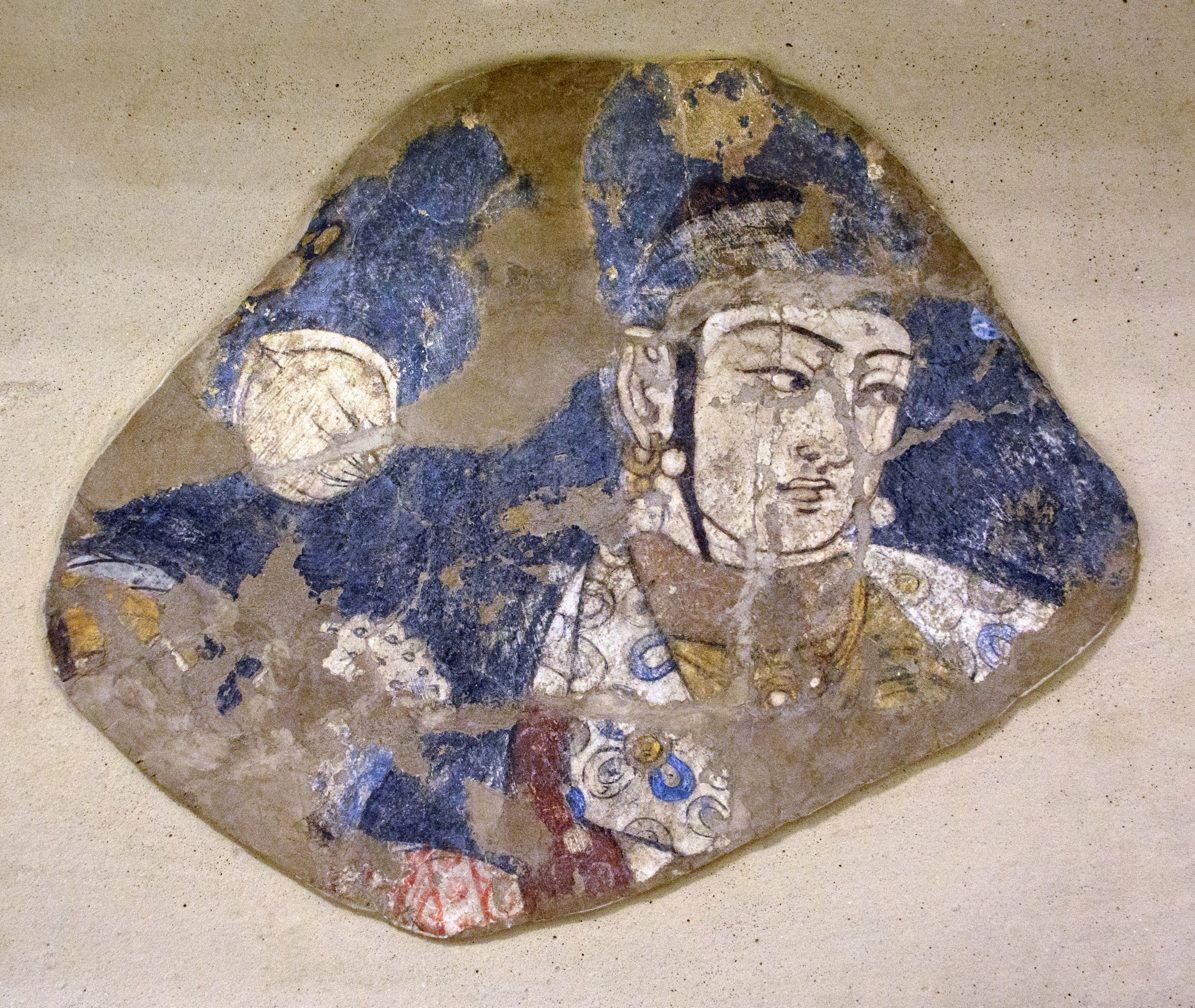
Tavka Kurgan wall painting. 5th-6th century CE. Archaeological Museum of Termez

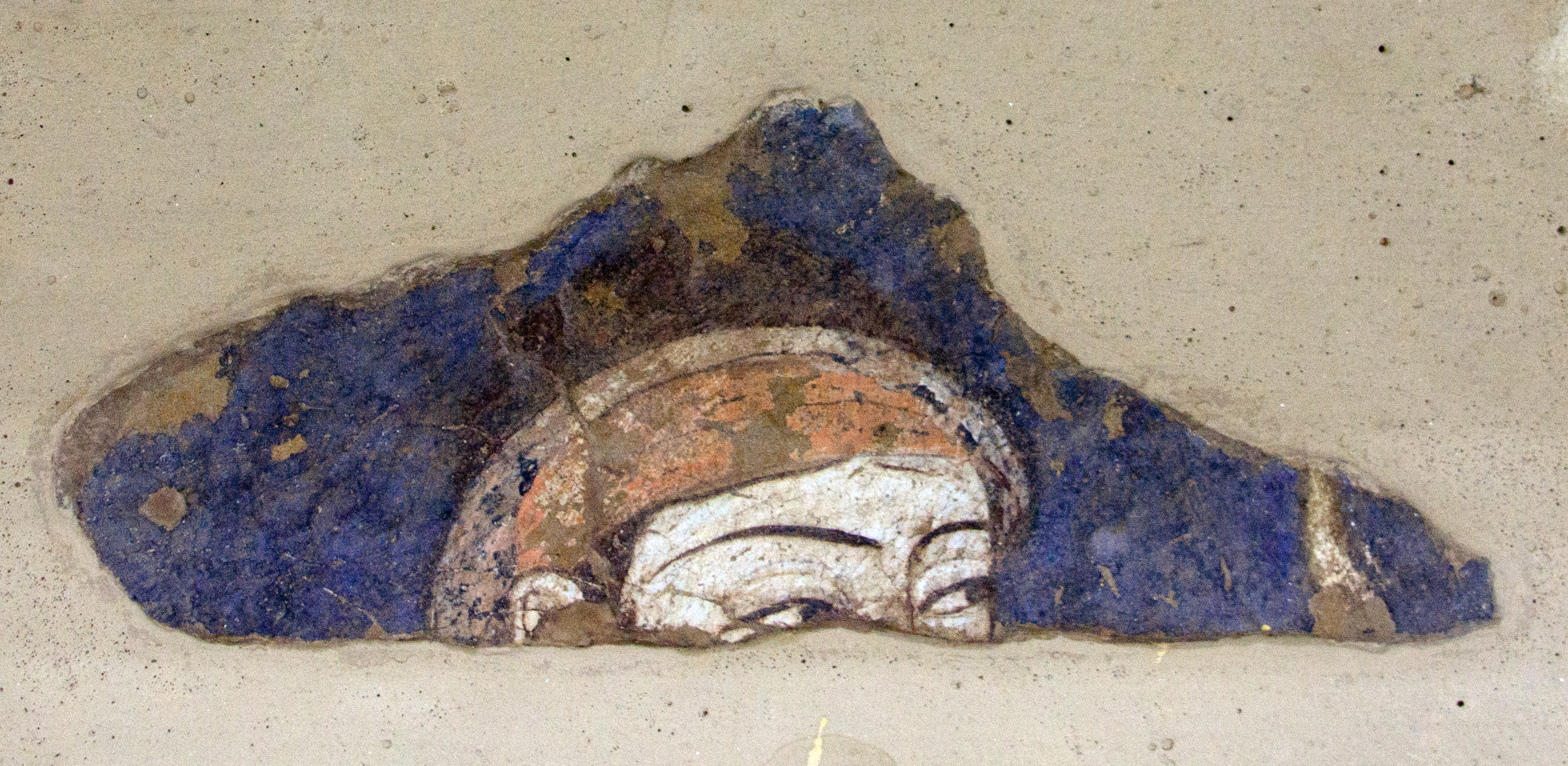
Tavka Kurgan wall painting. 5th-6th century CE. Archaeological Museum of Termez

== See also ==
- Dilberjin Tepe

== Sources ==
- Rakhmanov, Shaymardankul A. (19 May 2017). "Wall Paintings from Tavka, Uzbekistan". Journal of Inner Asian Art and Archaeology. 7: 31–54. doi:10.1484/J.JIAAA.4.2017003.
