= Stamp seal (BM 119999) =

Iranian stamp seal

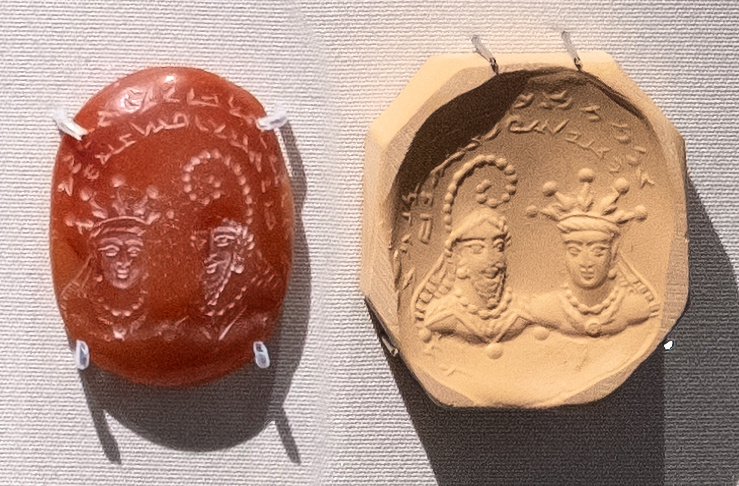
- The stamp seal with two facing busts and Sogdian inscription. Room 52, British Museum.
- Material: Carnelian
- Size: Length: 3.30 centimetres Width: 2.60 centimetres
- Created: 4th-6th century CE
- Present location: Room 52, British Museum, London
- Registration: 1870, 1210.3

Location
- Location of the region of Sogdia, to which the stamp seal belongs.

Stamp seal (BM 119999), is a historical stamp seal from the British Museum, with reference number BM 119999, located in Room 52 of the museum. The stamp seal was procured by Sir Alexander Cunningham, who sold it to the British Museum in 1870. Another, nearly identical, seal, is located in the Calcutta Museum.

== Description ==
The seal is made of carnelian, a precious stone, and rather hard to engrave. It is considered as "a Sogdian double portrait". It shows two facing busts. One is a bearded male, wearing a forward-projecting cap bordered with pearls, as well as a diadem, ear-rings and a necklace. The other wears a radiate crown with royal ribbons. Above is an inscription in two lines, in the Sogdian language.

=== Other examples ===
The design with two facing busts is also visible in some of the coinage of the period, although the small space of the coins seems to have forced to two busts to come closer together. It has been suggested that this design was influenced by some Byzantine coins, but this may not be necessarily so.

== Kushano-Sasanian period (c.230 – c.365 CE) ==
The stamp seal is dated by the British Museum to 300-350 CE, during the Kushano-Sasanian period, and belongs to the area of Sogdia, north of the Oxus. In this, the museum follows the conclusions of Bivar (1969), and Livshits (1969), according to which the seal should be dated to the 4th century CE. Livshits (1969) also offered a reading for the Sogdian inscription, which is the one still used by the British Museum:

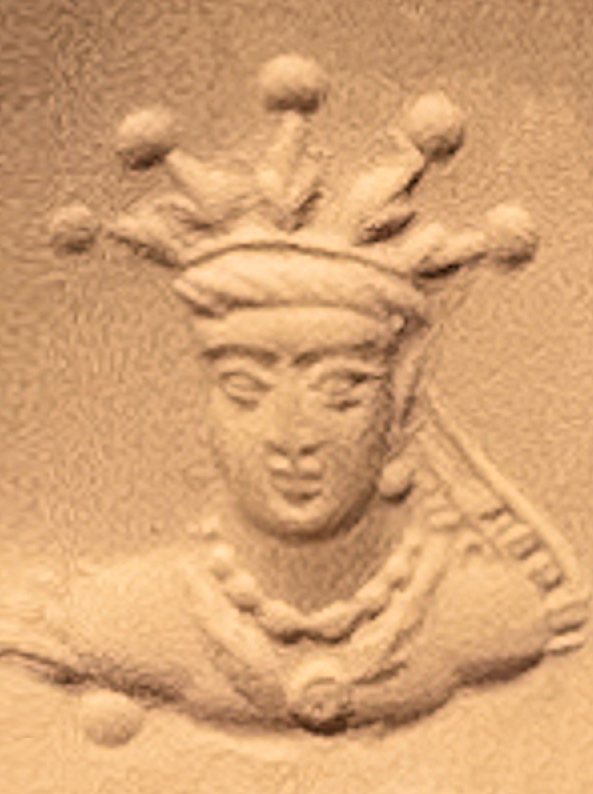
The ruler with radiate crown, royal ribbons and necklace with pearls (detail of the seal).

(1) 'yt mydrh cwn ’yn/ztmyc
(2) (p) ’nbsn z ’ ’ntyh (or zc ’ntyh, n ’cztyh)
This seal is from (of) Indamic
Queen of Zacanta

— Seal inscription, according to Livshits (1969).

Paleographical comparisons also suggests a "rough date" of the 4th century CE, and at any rate before the second half of the 5th century CE. Stylistically, the stamp seal is said to share the artistic characteristics of other known Kushano-Sasanians seals, but also Hephthalites seals.

== Hephthalite period (c.440 – c.560 CE) ==
Livshits (2000) has since reappraised the datation of the stamp seal as well as the translation of the Sogdian legend. In his latest analysis, he thought that the seal should be dated to the 5th-6th century CE, and should read:

Inscription of the Stamp seal (BM 119999)^{According to Livshits (2000).}
Line	Original (Sogdian alphabet)	Transliteration	English translation
1	𐼀𐼊𐼛 𐼍𐼊𐼘𐼘𐼆 𐼕𐼇𐼏 𐼀𐼊𐼎𐼚𐼇𐼍𐼊𐼖	ʾyt myẟrh cwn ʾyntwmyc	This gem is from the Indian
2	𐼔𐼀𐼎𐼂𐼙𐼏 𐼎𐼀𐼎𐼚𐼊𐼆	pʾnꞵšn nʾntyh	Lady, Nandi

Kurbanov (2010) considers that the seal is characteristic of Hephthalite seals.

== Related artifacts ==
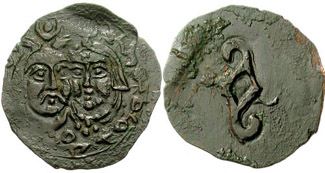
Hephthalite coin of the Principality of Chaghaniyan, with the two busts of a crowned King and Queen, in Byzantine fashion, circa 550-650 CE.

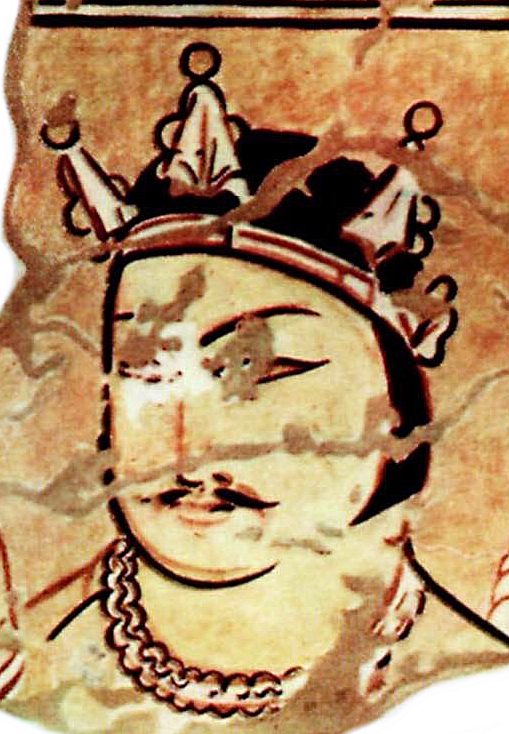
Ruler with radiate crown from Dilberjin Tepe

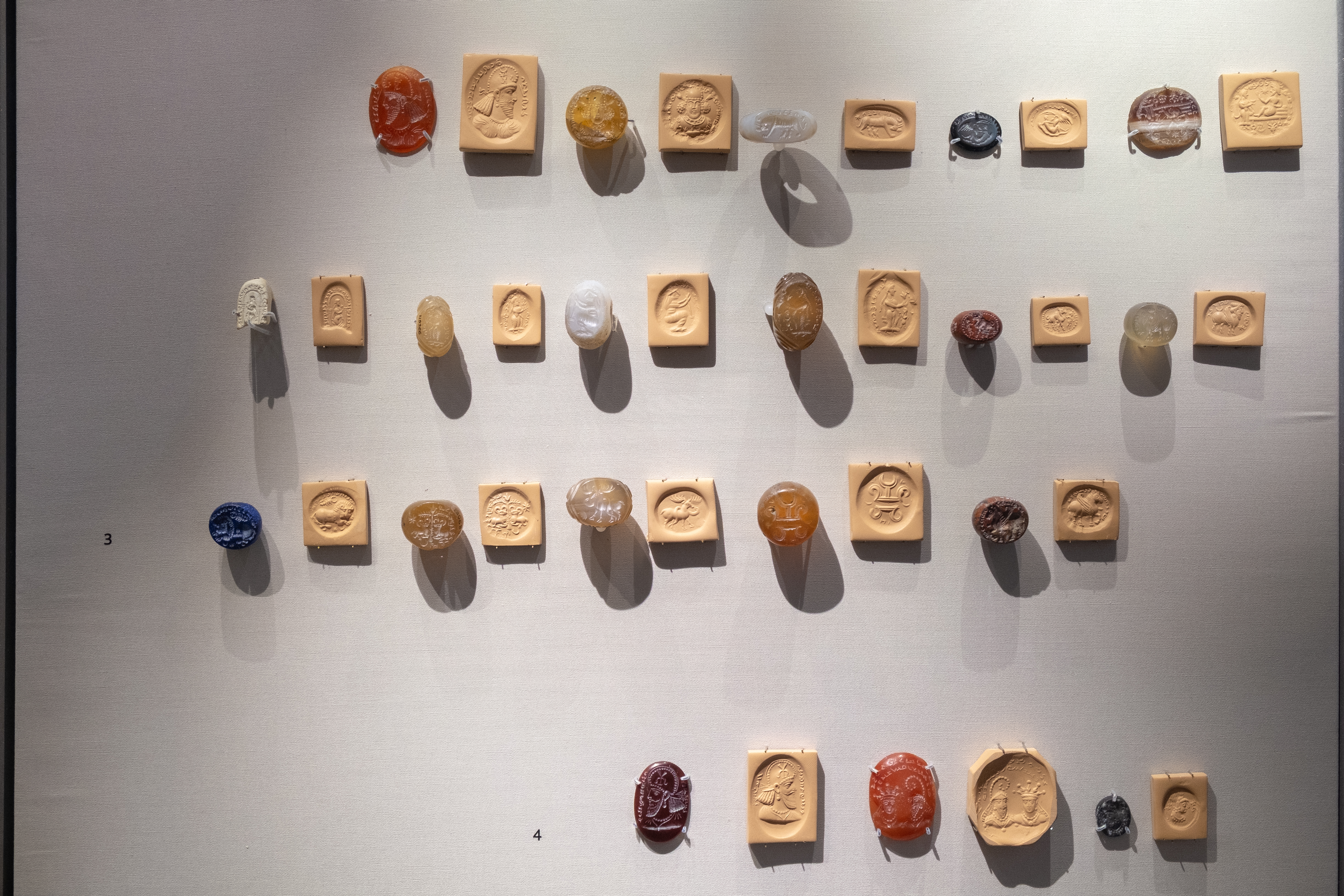
Other similar seals in the British Museum (Room 52)

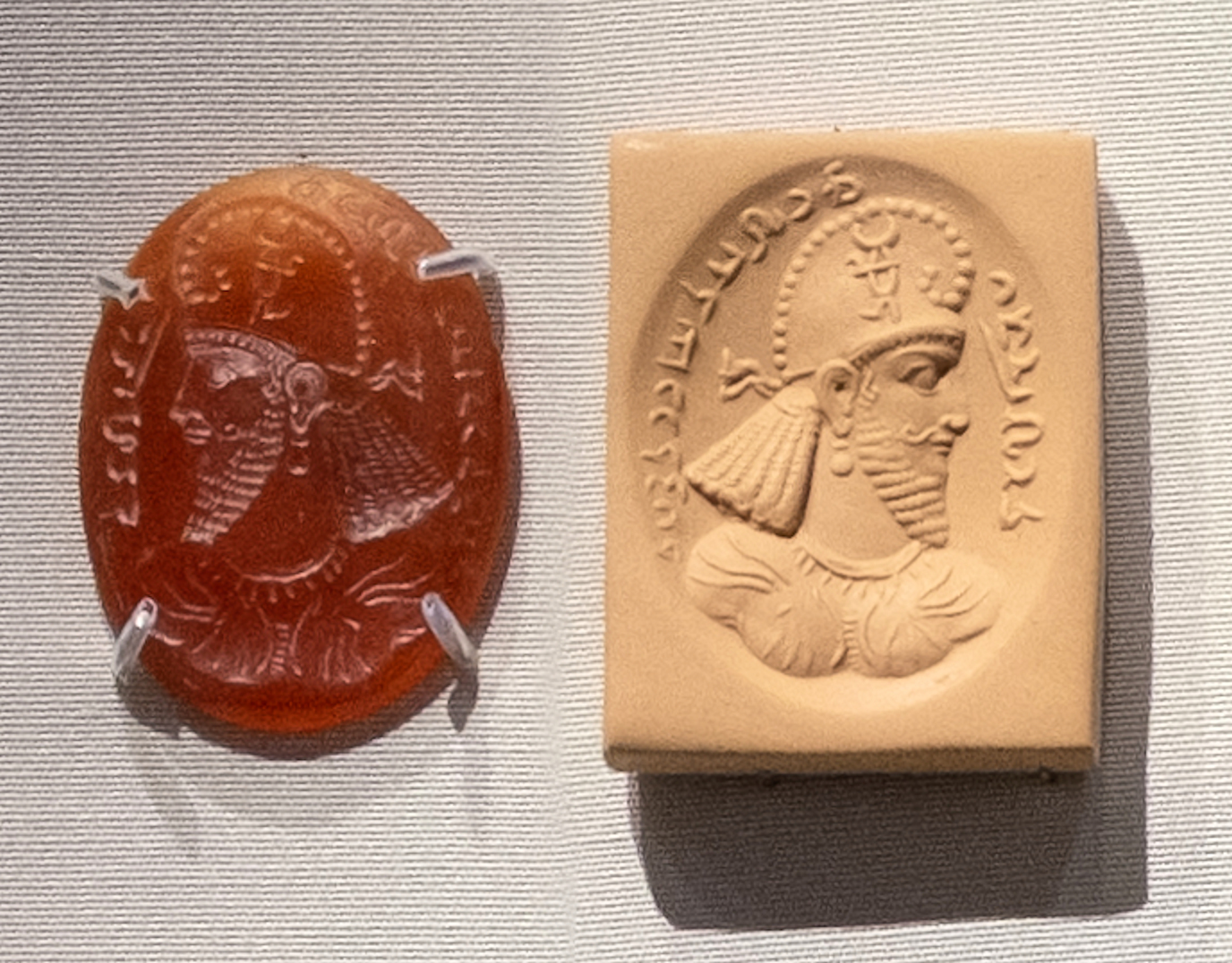
Sasanian official with broadly similar crown, Northern Syria, 5th century CE

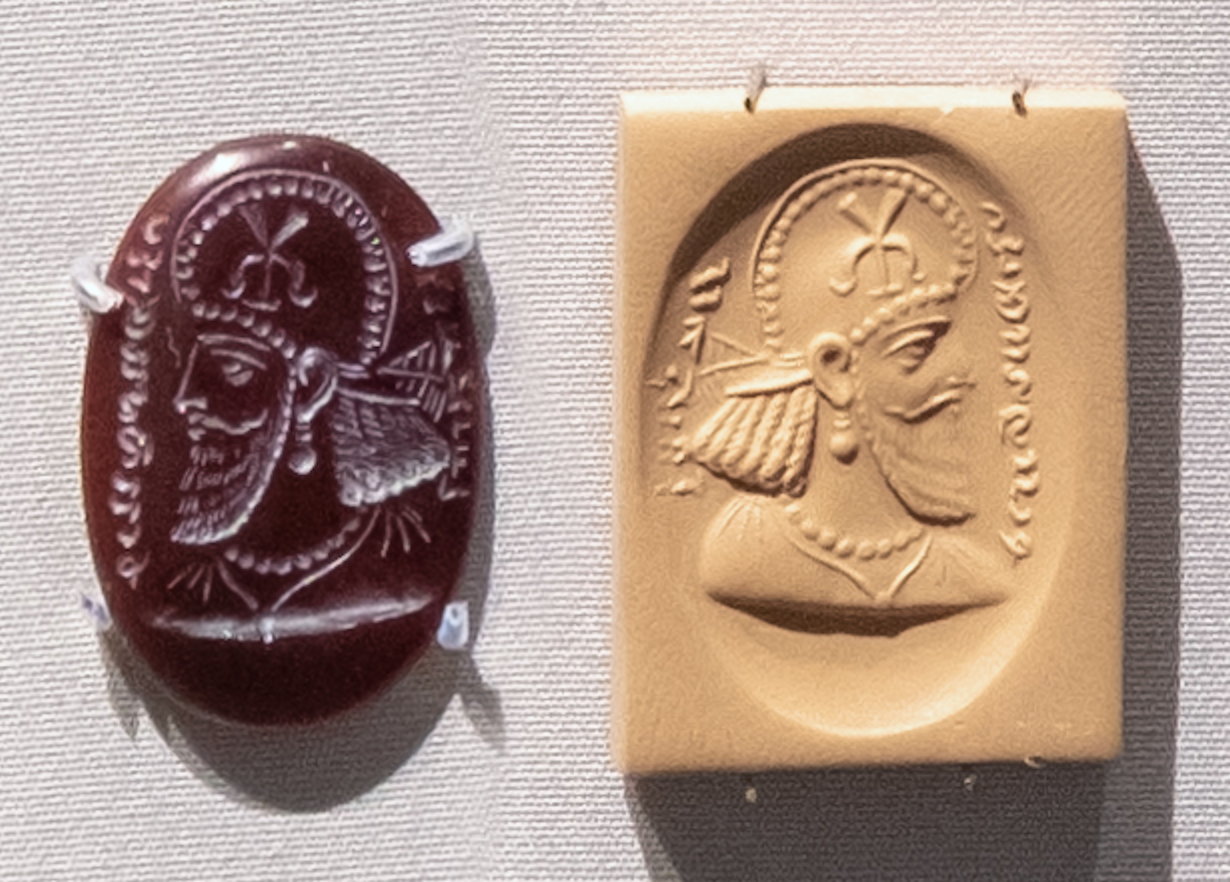
Sasanian seal with inscription Pahlavi "Perozhormizd, son of the Kanarang" (a Governor of easternmost Sasanian territory, Abarshahr, a title first attested in the 5th century CE). British Museum 134847.
