= Balalyk Tepe =

Archaeological site in Uzbekistan

Coordinates: 37.535384°N 67.115405°E

Balalyk tepe

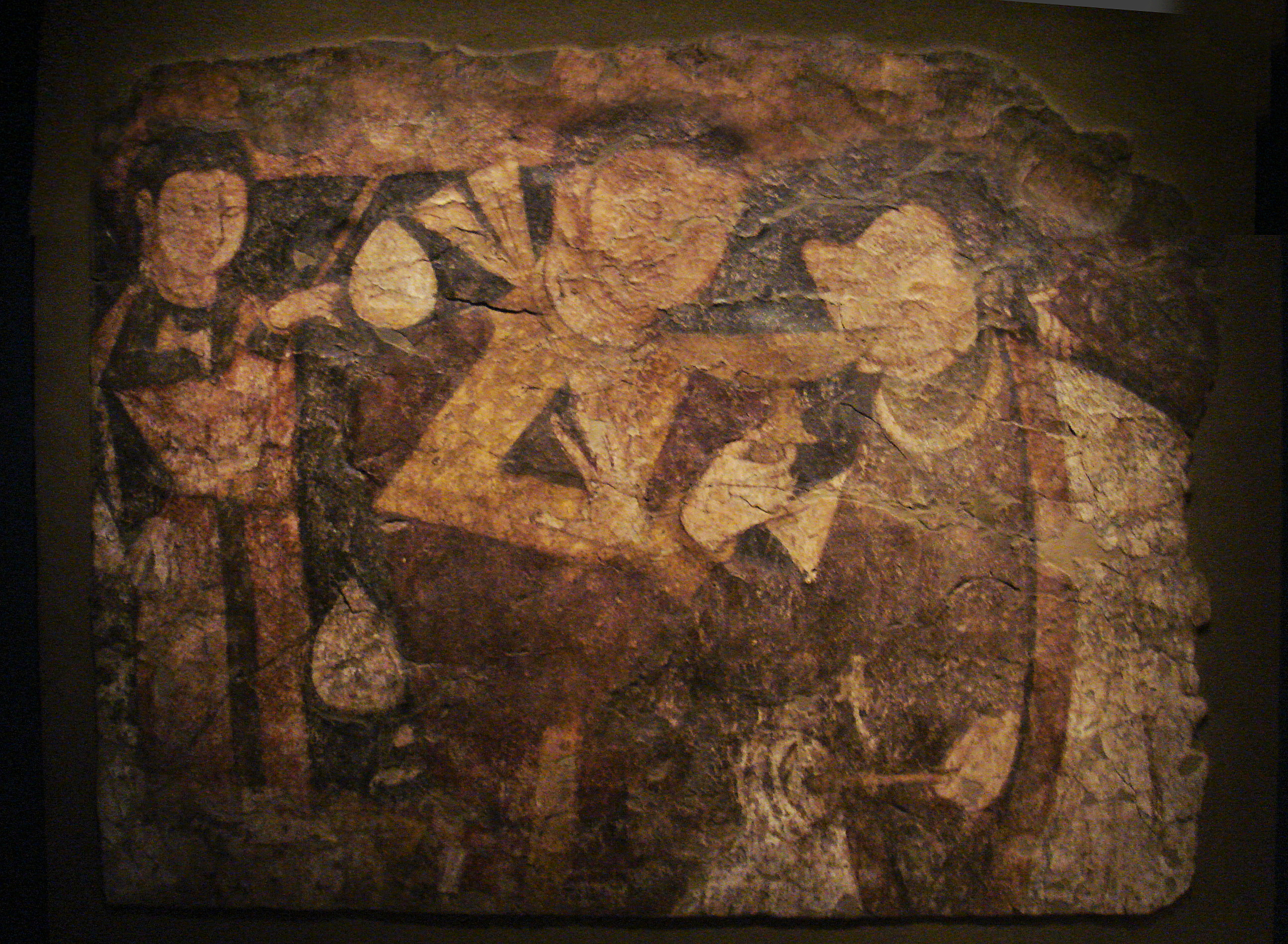
Mural detail, Balalyk Tepe, late 5th-7th century CE

Location of Balalyk tepe
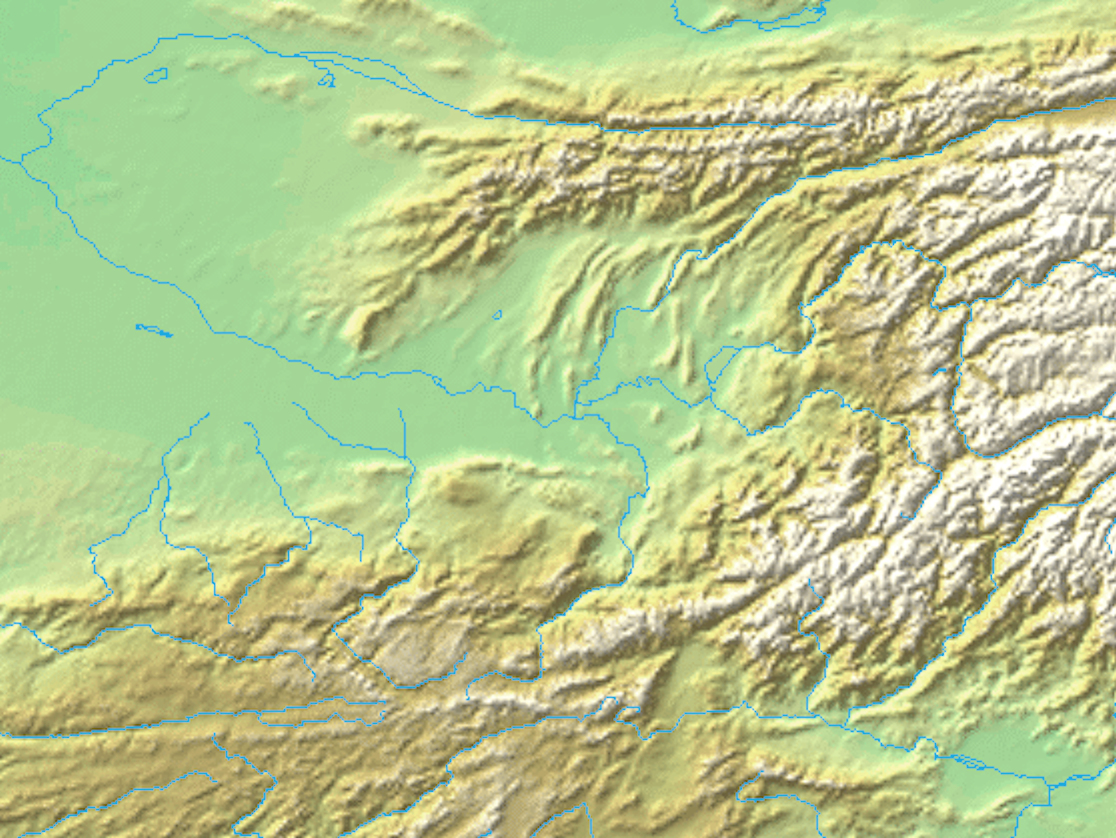
Balalyk tepe (Bactria)
Balalyk tepe (Uzbekistan)

Balalyk tepe, in former Bactria, modern Uzbekistan, is a Central Asian archaeological site with many mural paintings. It was the site of a small fortified manor belonging to a princely Hephthalite clan. It is generally dated a bit later than the painting at Dilberjin, from the late 5th century to the early 7th century CE, or from the end of the 6th century to the early 7th century CE. The paintings of Balalyk Tepe are part of a "Tokharistan school", which also includes Adzhina-tepe and Kafyr-kala. They are succeeded chronologically by the Sogdian art of Penjikent.

== Murals ==
The theme of the Balalyk-tepe is uniformly related to feasting. The style of the painting is quite different from the native style of Penjikent, Afrasiab or Varakhsha. Although the pervasive theme of the banquet is different from the religious theme of the Buddhist murals of Tokharistan, and the painting do not have a Buddhist character despite the presence of a few elements, some similarities can be found in style and iconography.

The men in the paintings are beardless and the women have rounded features. They are adorned with splendid costumes and beautiful jewelry.

The paintings seem to depict the Hepthalites in the early 6th century CE, before the arrival of the Turks of the First Turkic Khaganate and the consolidation of the Oxus as their southern border in 571 CE, encompassing Balalyk Tepe. Most of the wall paintings were destroyed in the second half of the 6th century (550-600 CE). Very similar Hephthalite types are seen in the paintings of the donors of the Buddhas of Bamiyan, on the ceiling of the 35 meter Buddha.

The paintings of Balalyk Tepe are very similar to those of Dilberjin Tepe, and some from Bamiyan, which both belong about a century earlier to the 5th-6th century CE, or even as early as the 4th century according to some authorities, based on numismatic evidence. The paintings of Balalyk Tepe are also sometimes considered as the oldest of "the large pictorial cycles" in Central Asia.

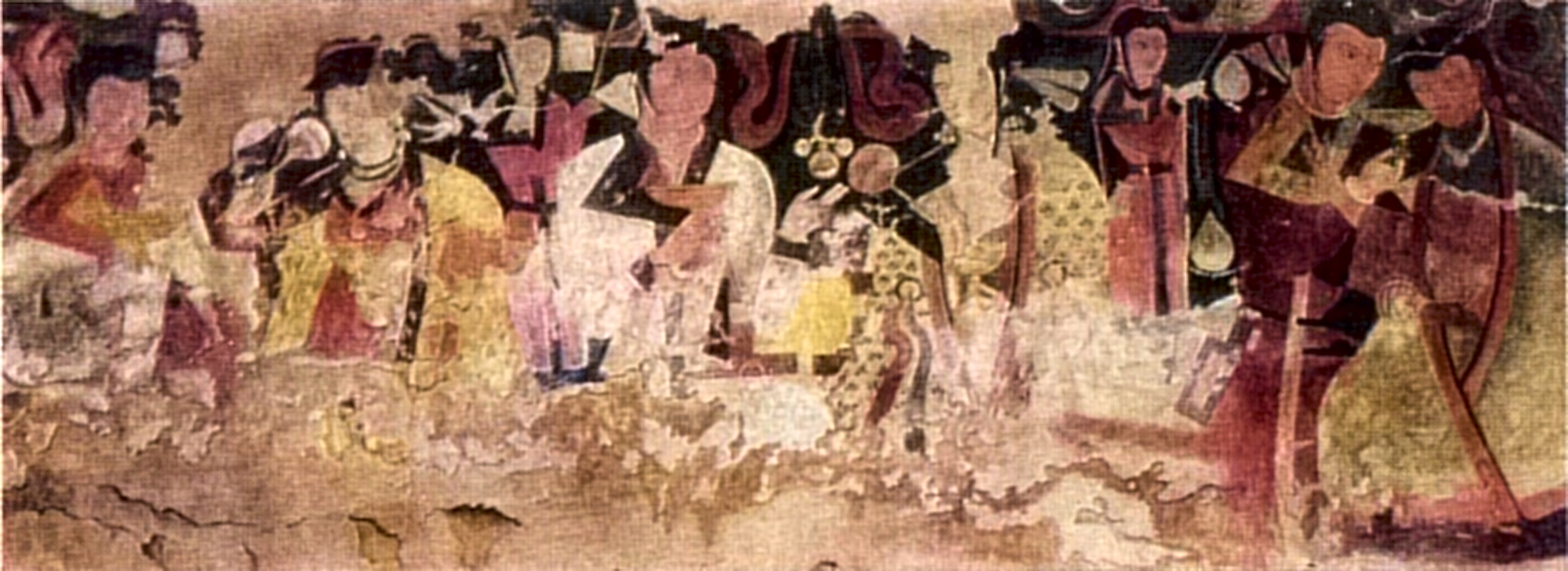
Balalyk Tepe mural

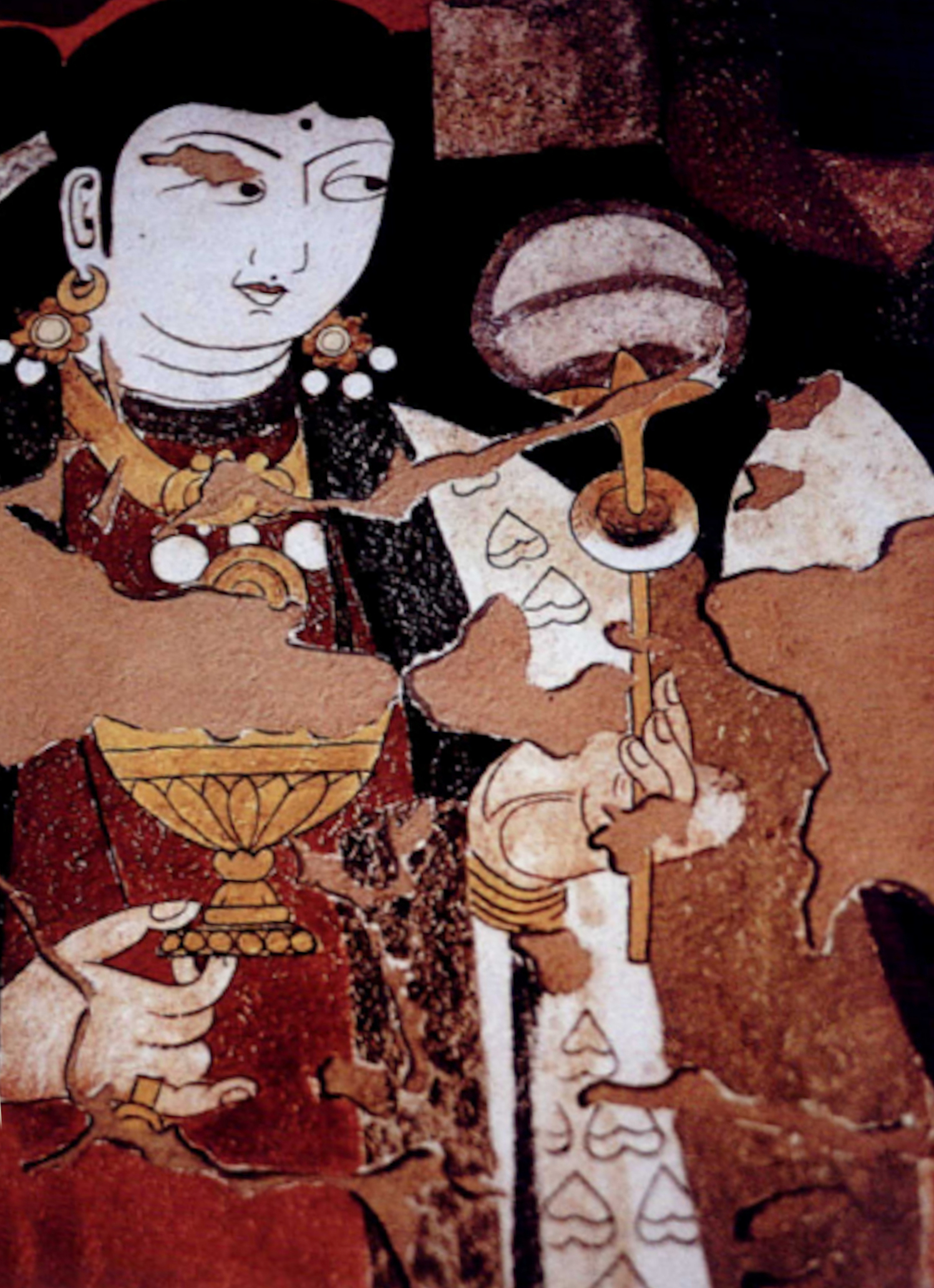
Figure of a banquet, Balalyk Tepe, 6th-7th century CE

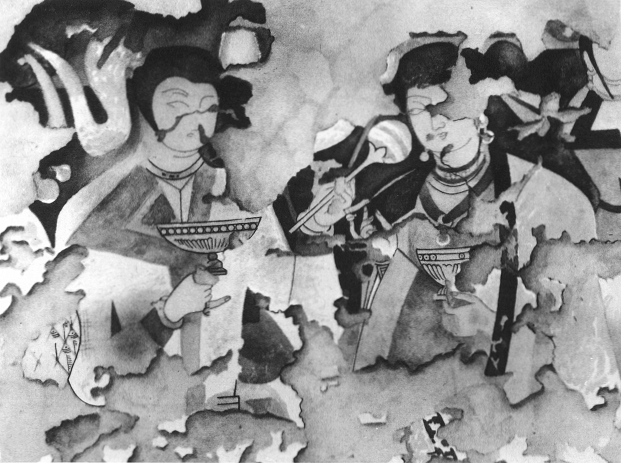
Balalyk tepe Banquet scene, 6-7th century CE

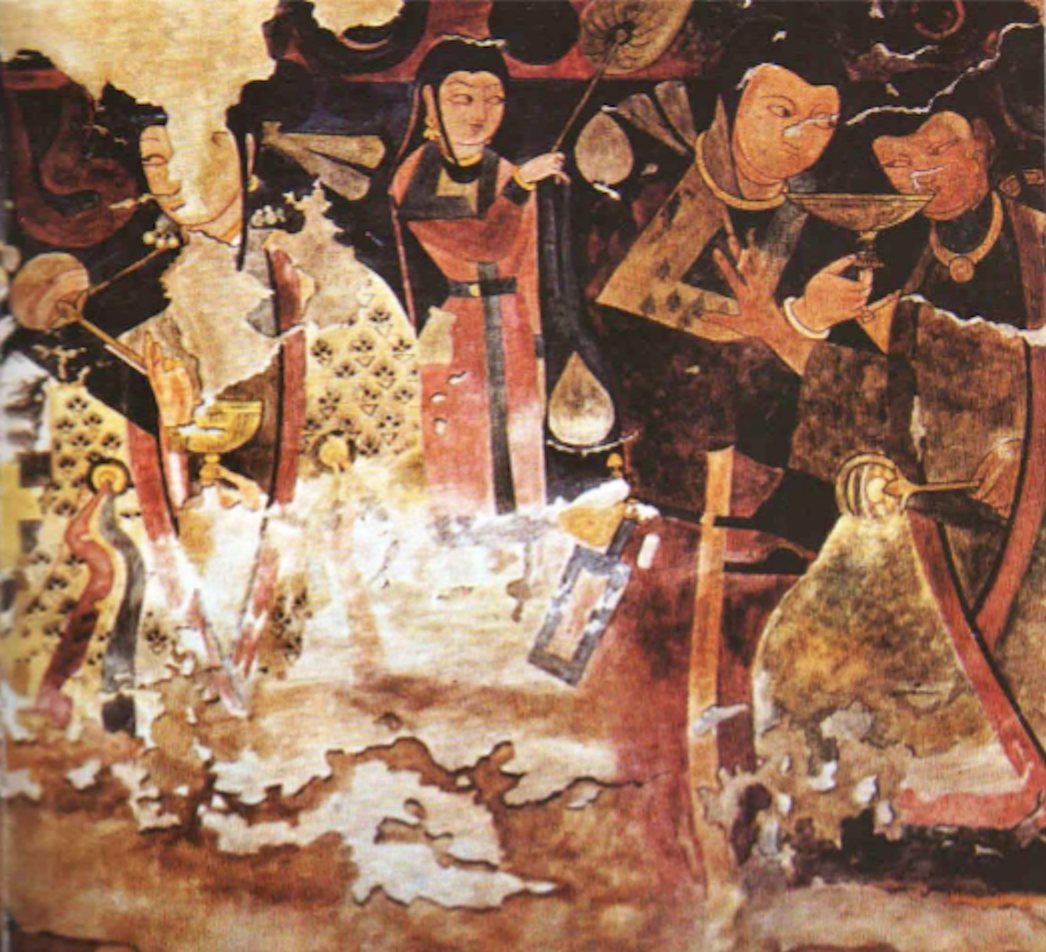
Balalyk tepe Banquet scene, 6-7th century CE

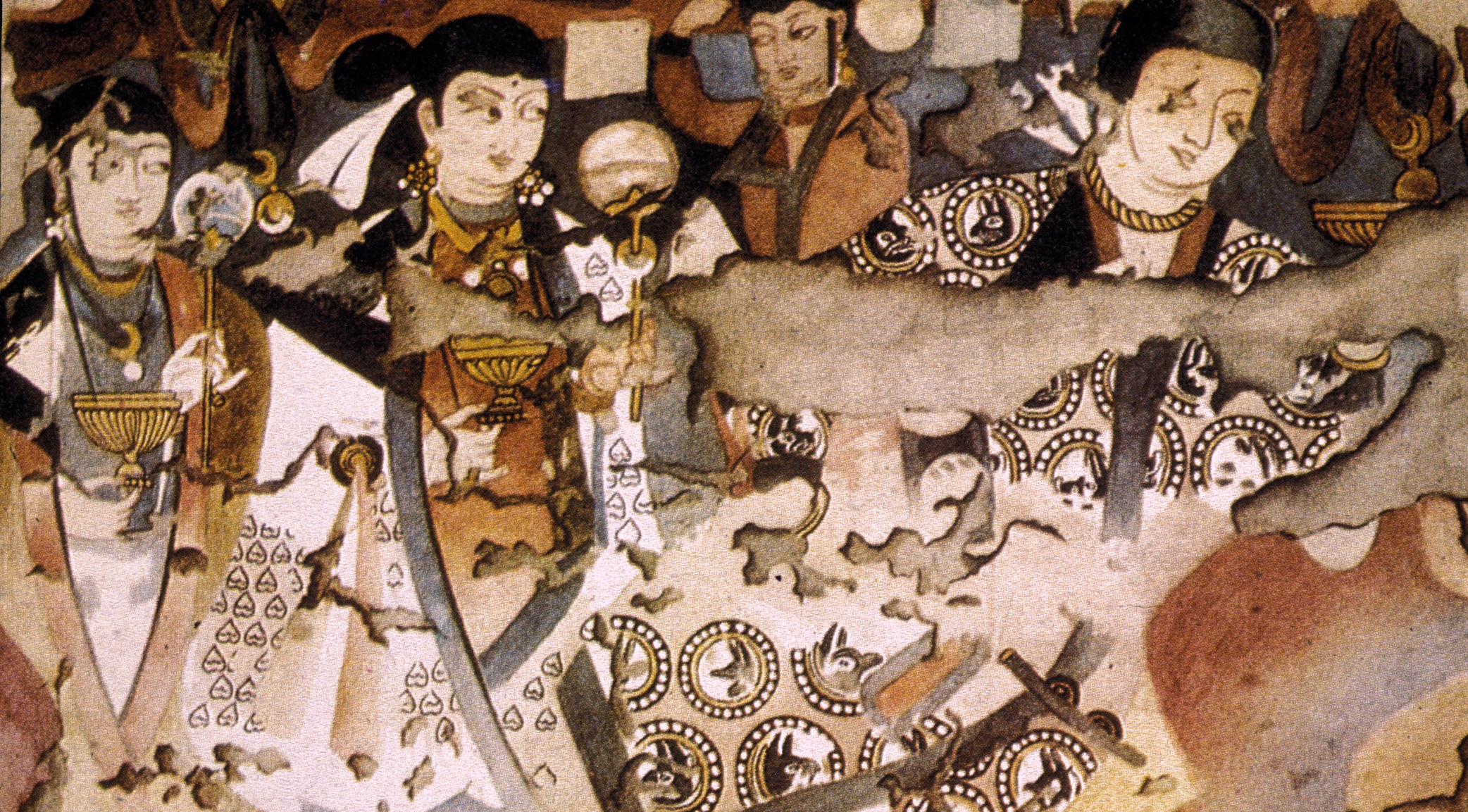
Balalyk tepe Banquet scene, 6-7th century CE

== Attribution ==
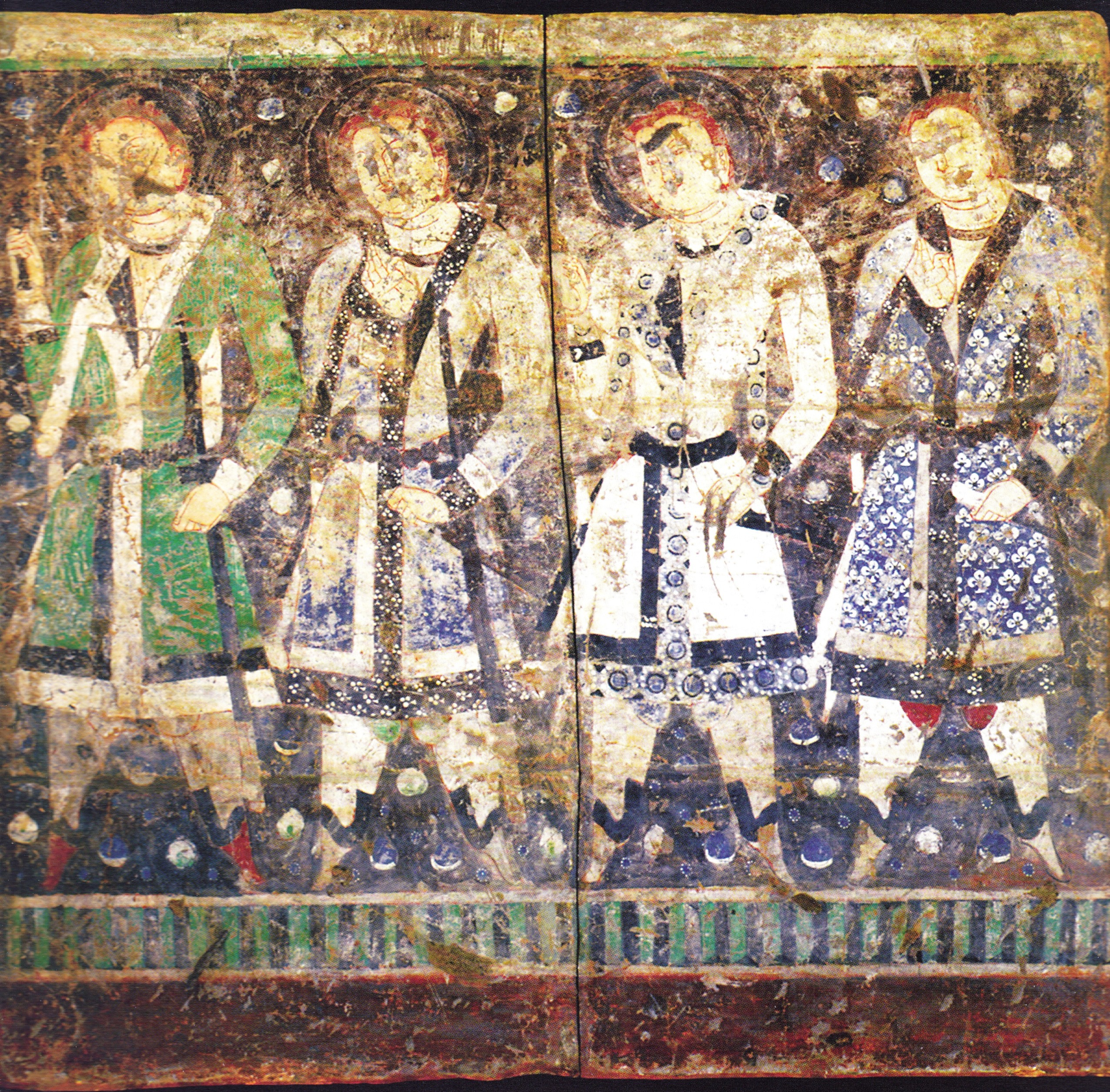
Swordmen in Kizil Caves

Many authors have suggested that the figures in the Balalyk Tepe paintings are characteristic of the Hephthalites (450-570 CE). In this context, parallels have been drawn with the figures from Kizil Caves in Chinese Turkestan, which seem to wear broadly similar clothing. The paintings of Balalyk Tepe would be characteristic of the court life of the Hephthalites in the first half of the 6th century CE, before the arrival of the Turks.

The paintings of Balalyk Tepe are also sometimes attributed to the time after the arrival of the First Turkic Khaganate and the Western Turks (571-720 CE), who occupied the region north of the Oxus, including Balalyk Tepe, after 571 CE, while the Sasanians remained to the south. The attribution to the Turks has also been suggested for other sites further south, such as Dokhtar-i-Noshirwan.

=== Numismatic parallels ===
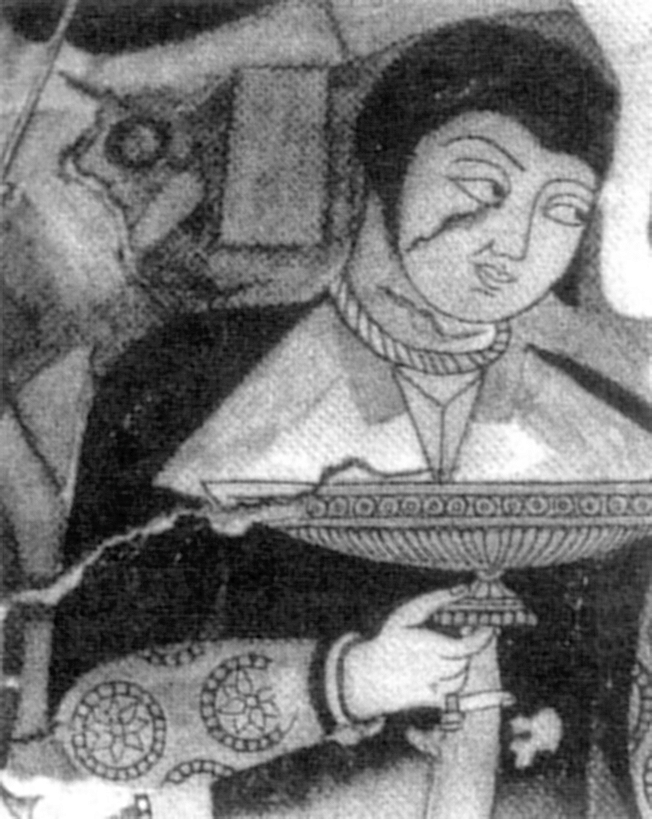
Mural of a man, from Balalyk Tepe, with an appearance similar to that on some of the coinage of Chach. 5th-7th century CE.

Some attempts have been made at identifying similarities between the types of Balalyk Tepe and the portraits on coins of the region. In some coins from Chach, modern Tashkent, rulers appear in portrait, facing right, with a tamgha in the shape of an X, and a circular Sogdian legend. They also often appear with a crescent over the head. It has been suggested that the facial characteristics and the hairstyle of these rulers as they appear on their coinage (round faces, almost plump, with almond-shaped eyes and straight hair cut above the shoulders), are similar to those appearing on the murals of Balalyk Tepe further south.

Michael Fedorov attributed this type of coinage to the Chionites (Hephthalites), who are known to have ruled in Chach (modern Tashkent), at the foot of the Altai Range, between the middle of the 4th century CE to the 6th century CE. The Chionites of Chach disappeared in the 7th century, when the invading Western Turks killed the last Chionite ruler circa 605 CE, to replace him by a Turkish Tegin from the Ashina tribe.

Other authors have attributed these coins to the next period, between 625 and 725 CE, corresponding to the control of the area of Chach by the Western Turks.

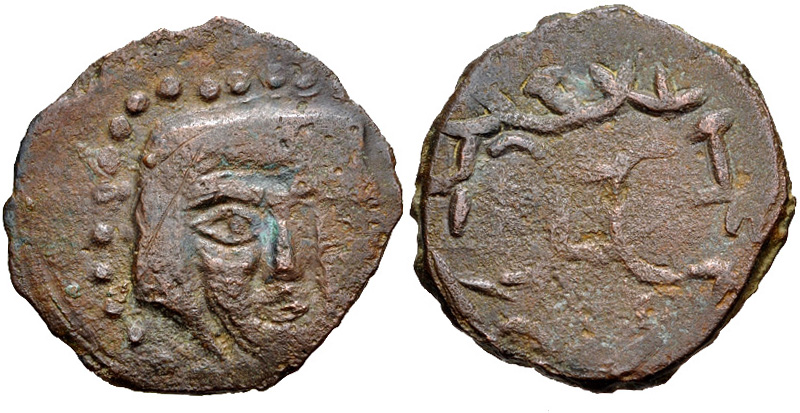
Coinage of Chach

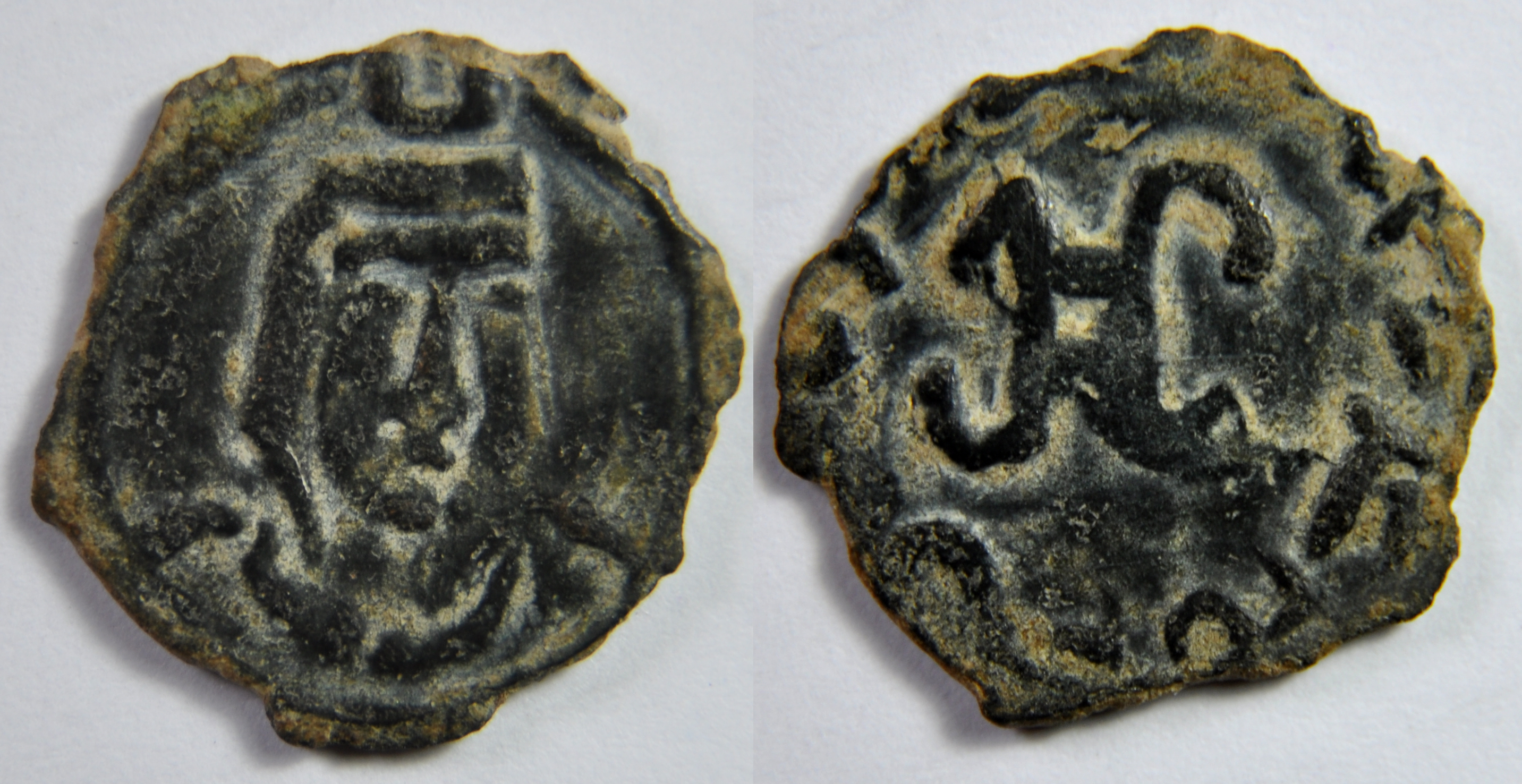
Coinage of Chach

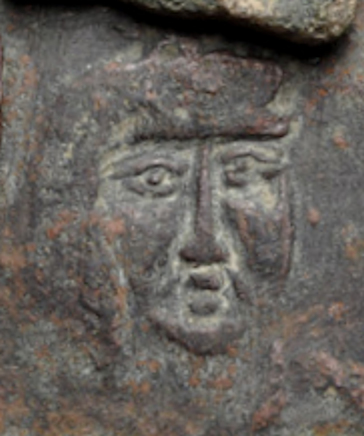
Portrait on a coin of Chach.

== See also ==
- Tavka Kurgan
- Penjikent
- Dalverzin Tepe
- Kara Tepe
- Fayaz Tepe
