= Dilberjin Tepe =

Ancient town in Afghanistan

Coordinates: 37°01′21″N 66°31′35″E

Dilberjin Tepe

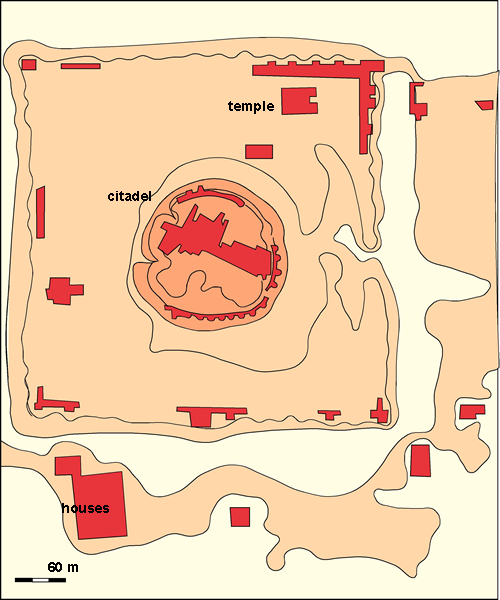
Map of Dilberjin

Location of Dilberjin
Dilberjin (South Asia)
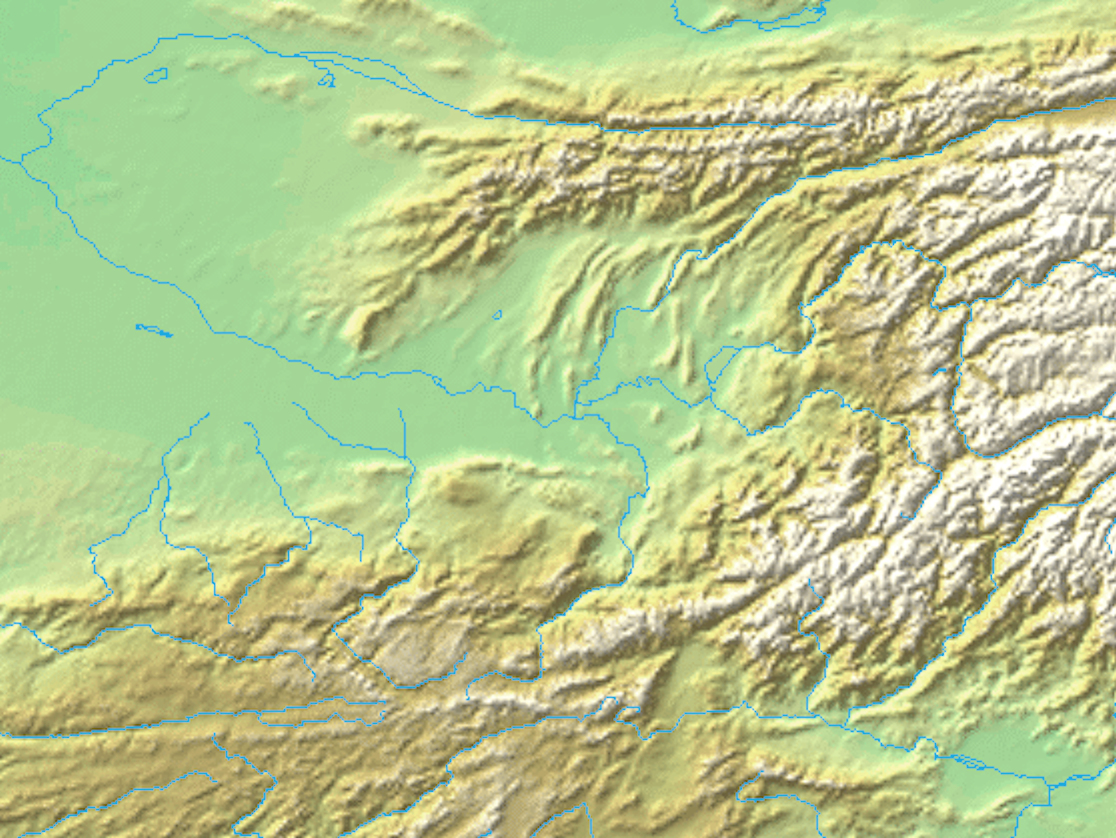
Dilberjin (Bactria)
Dilberjin (Afghanistan)

Dilberjin Tepe, also Dilberjin or Delbarjin (Persian: دلبَرجین), is the modern name for the remains of an ancient town in modern (northern) Afghanistan. The town was perhaps founded in the time of the Achaemenid Empire. Under the Kushan Empire it became a major local centre. After the Kushano-Sassanids the town was abandoned.

== Archaeological remains ==
The town proper was about 390 m × 390 m (1,280 ft × 1,280 ft) in size. Dilbarjin had a city wall built under the Kushan rule. In the middle of the town there was a round citadel, built at about the same time. In the north-east corner of the town was excavated a temple complex. Here were found many wall paintings, some in a purely Hellenistic style. Originally the temple was perhaps dedicated to the Dioscuri, of which a mural in Hellenistic style has been recovered. A long inscription in the kushan language was also discovered, dated to the early great Kushans, around the period of Kanishka I, on paleographic grounds, as it seems slightly younger than the inscription of Surkh Kotal. Outside the city walls there were still substantial buildings. Finds include inscriptions in Bactrian, most of them too destroyed to provide any historical information. There were fragments of sculpture and many coins.

=== Wall paintings ===
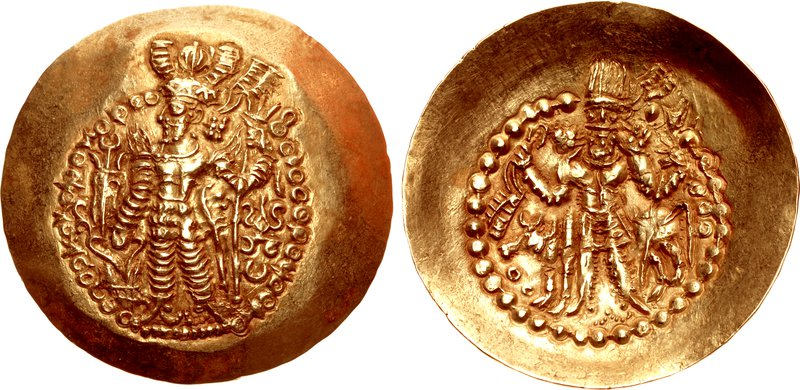
A coin of Kidara on the model of Varahran, of the type found in Dilberjin. Circa CE 350–365, Balkh mint.

The paintings of Dilberjin Tepe belong to the 5th-6th century CE, or even as early as the 4th century CE according to some authorities, based on numismatic evidence. The paintings have some similarity with those of Balalyk Tepe, and some from Bamiyan. A comparison with the swordsmen at Kizil Caves would also suggest a date from the 5th century to the early 6th century CE. The same authors consider that the paintings at Balalyk Tepe are about a century older than the paintings at Dilberjin, dating from the end of the 6th century to the early 7th century CE.

These murals are general thought to represent Hephthalites, with their characteristic tunics with a single lapel folded to the right, cropped hair and ornaments.

A famous mural shows a row of warriors in kaftan, relatively similar to the mural from Kyzyl.

A much later fresco showing an Indian scene, with Shiva and Parvati on the bull Nandi, has been dated to the 8th century CE.

=== Coinage ===
Coins of many periods were found at the site, including Hephthalite coins, but those of the Kushano-Sasanians and the Kidarites were the most numerous from the early Sasanian period to have been found on the site. About 72 such coins were found, belonging to Ardashir I, Peroz I, Hormiz I, as well as each type of the Varahran I, that is, the coins first struck under Varahran, and then those struck on the model of Varahran by the Kidarite rulers Kirada, Peroz and Kidara I. These coins suggest that the murals themselves should be dated to the late 4th century CE or early 5th century CE at the latest.

=== Pillaging and damage ===
In 2023, Iconem reported the detection of massive damage that had occurred to the site.

=== Paintings ===
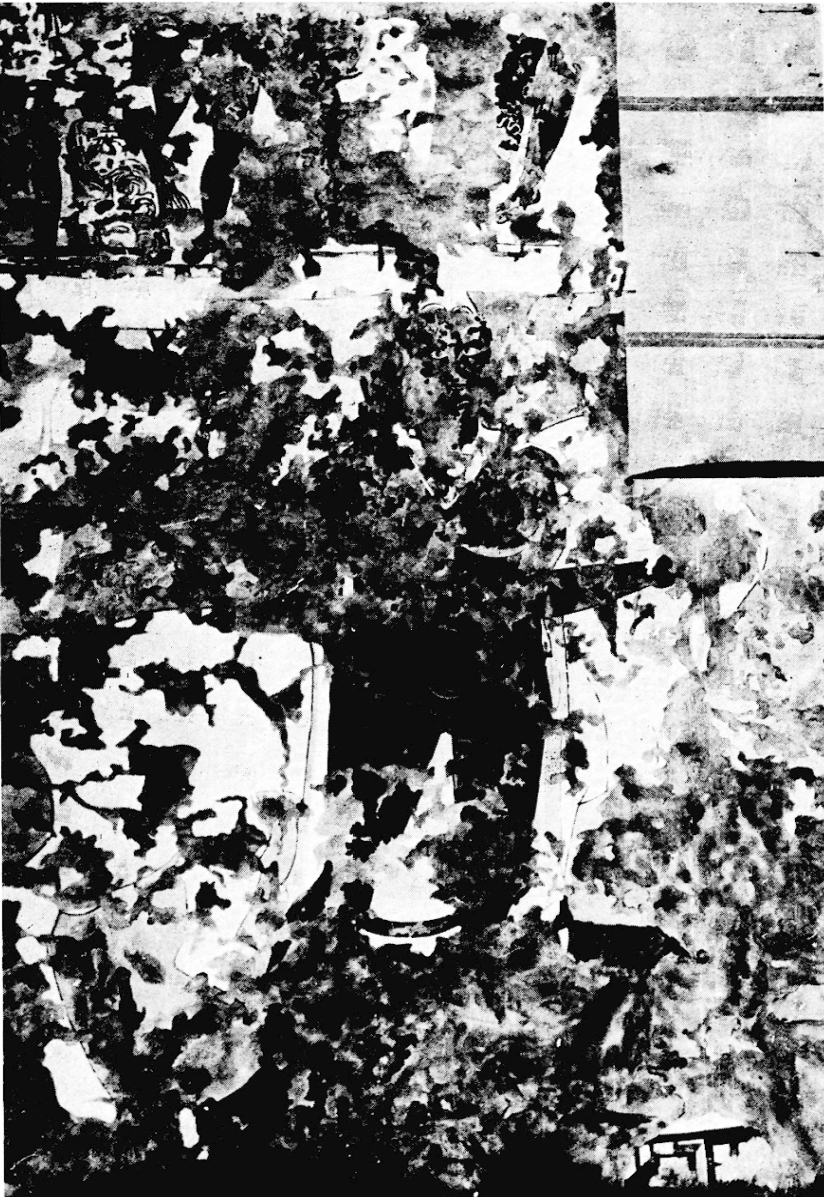
Remains of the Dioscuri mural at the entrance (left side of the mural).

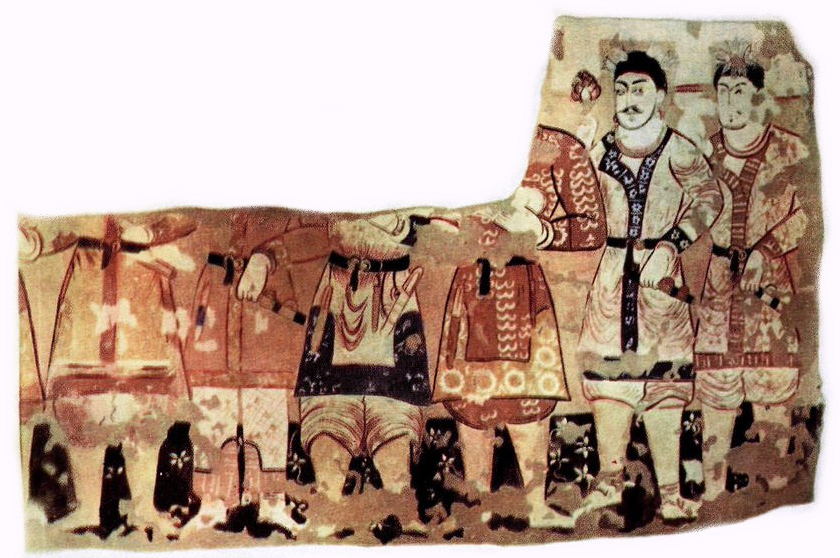
Dilberjin fresco, 5th-6th century.

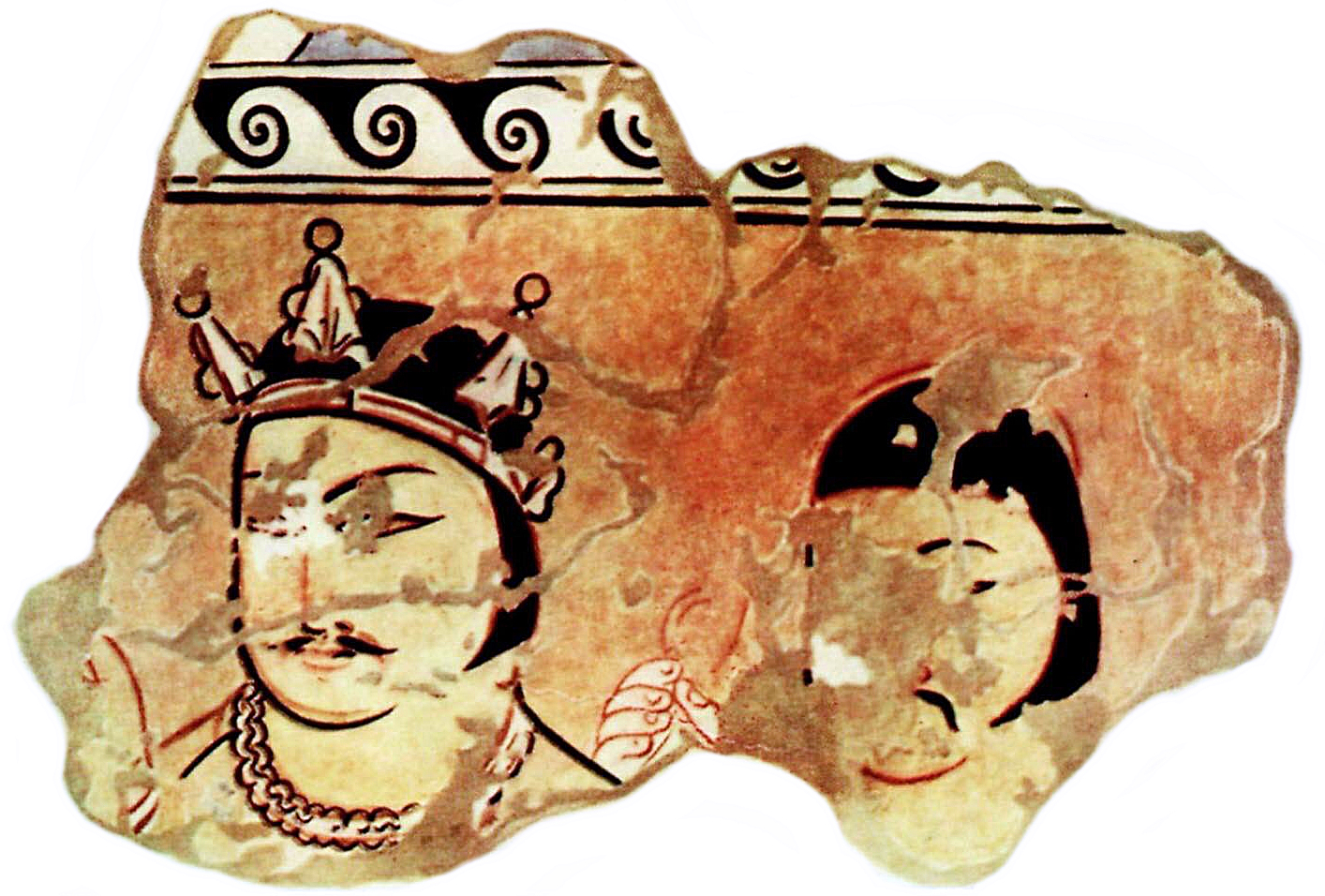
Dilberjin fresco fragment.

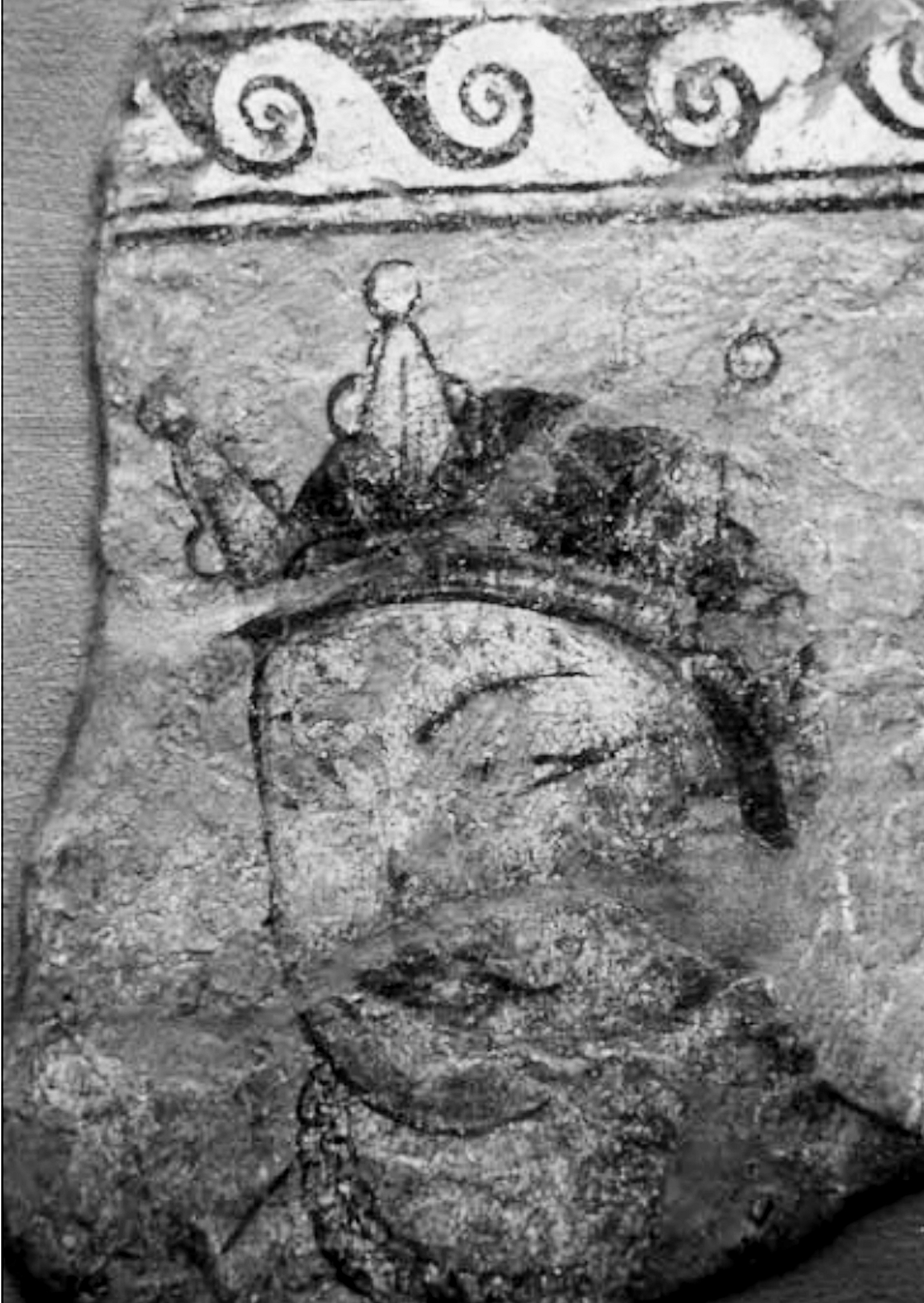
Dilbergin fresco royal figure

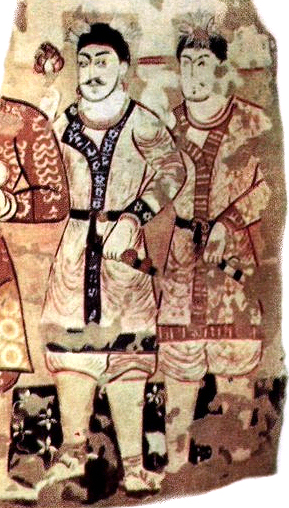
Dilberjin attendants

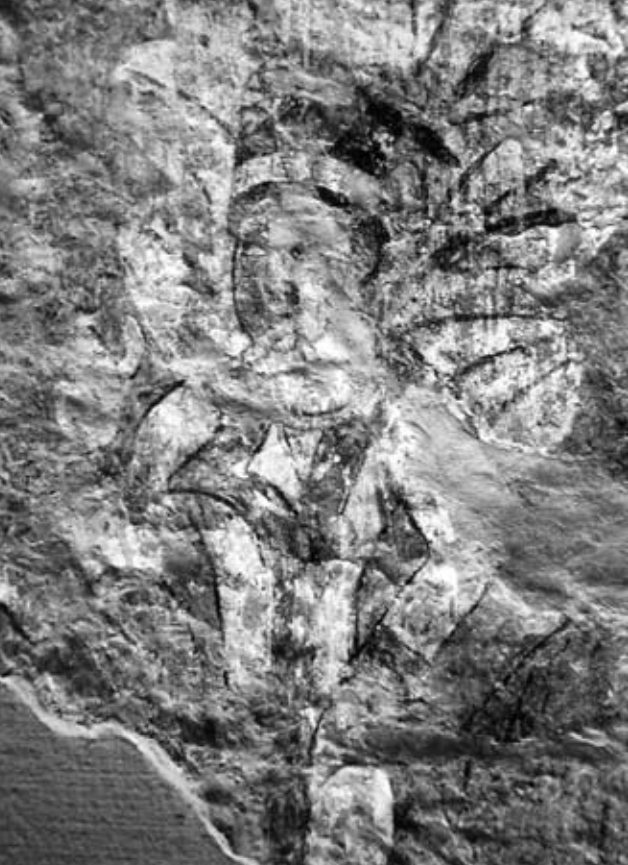
Man in white caftan coming out of a tree

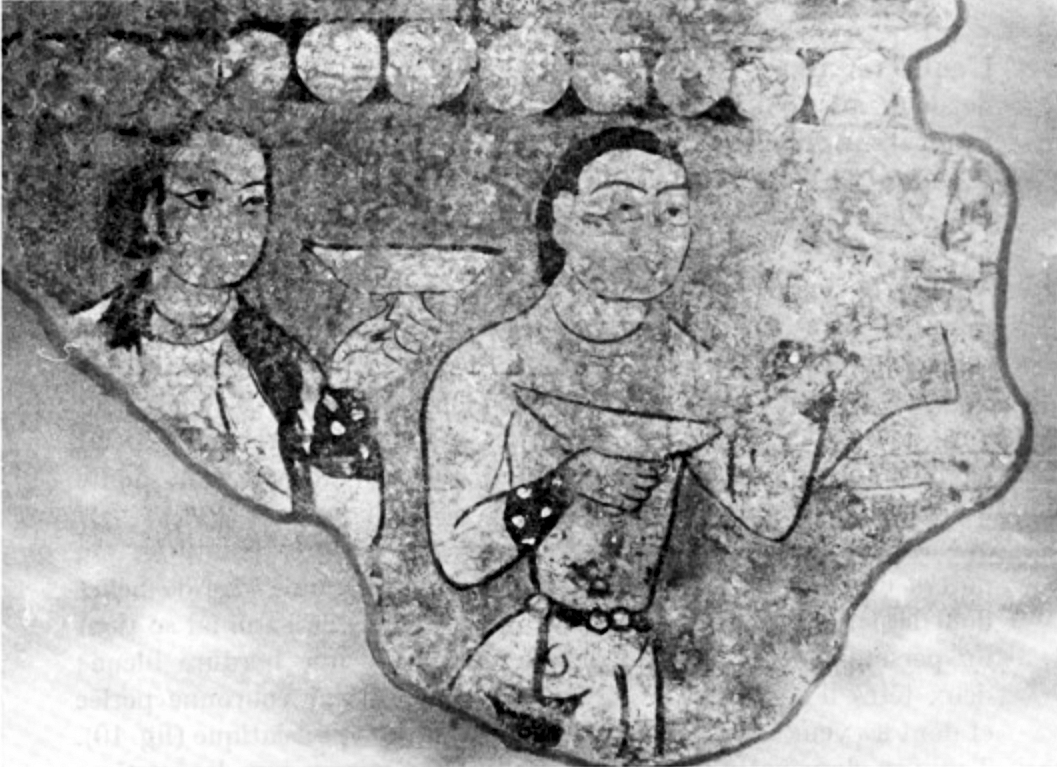
Cup bearers.

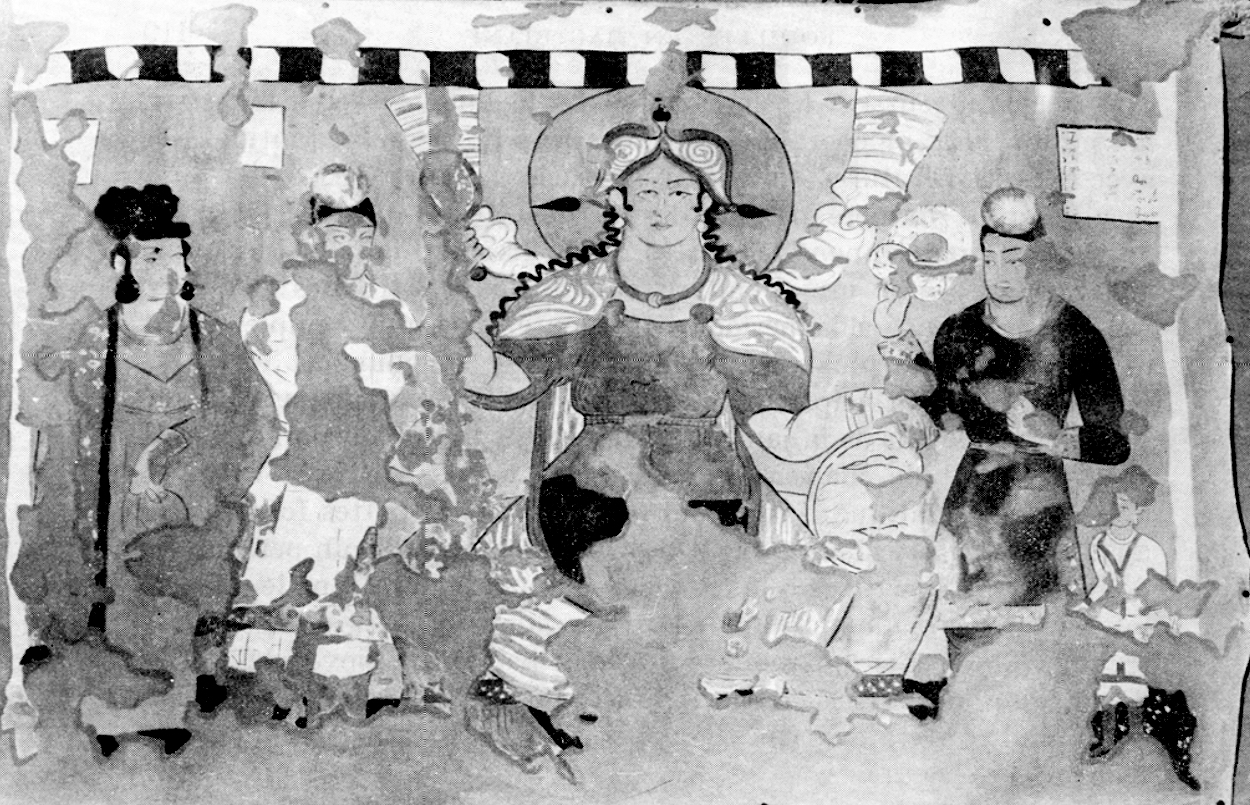
Athena Anahita.

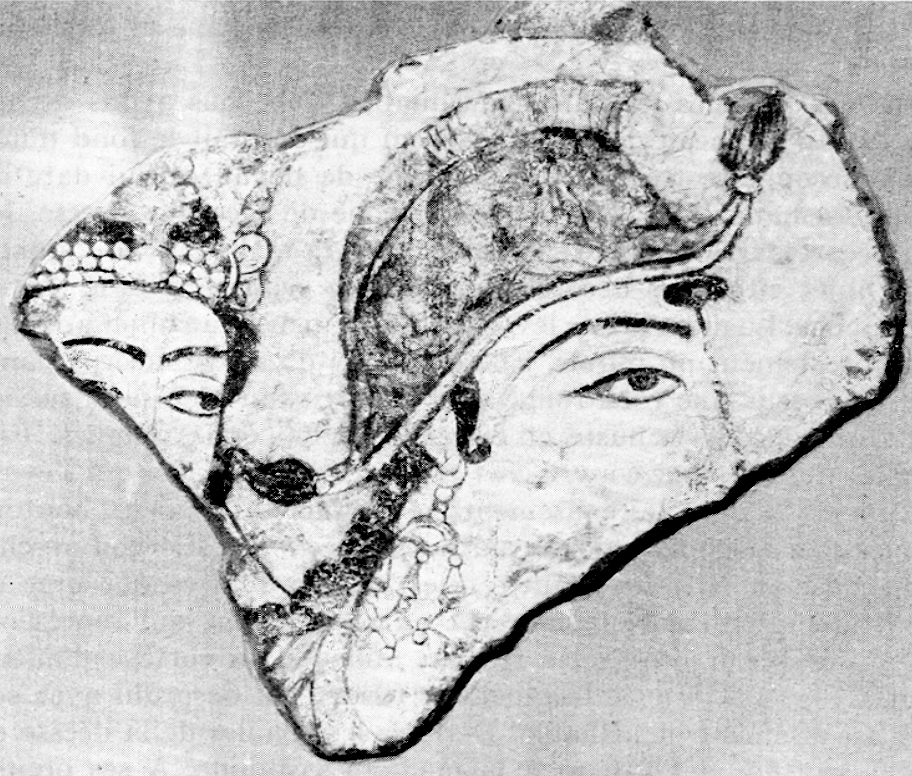
Athena Anahita in profile.

== See also ==
- Tavka Kurgan
- Penjikent
- Dalverzin Tepe
- Kara Tepe
- Fayaz Tepe
- Balalyk tepe
