= Dokhtar-i-Noshirwan =

- Dokhtar-i-Noshirwan
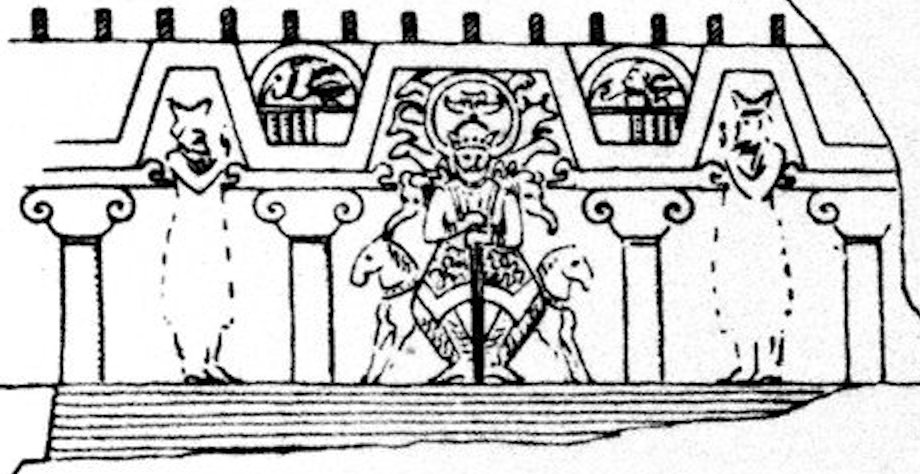
- Royal enthronement scene at Dokhtar i-Noshirwan.

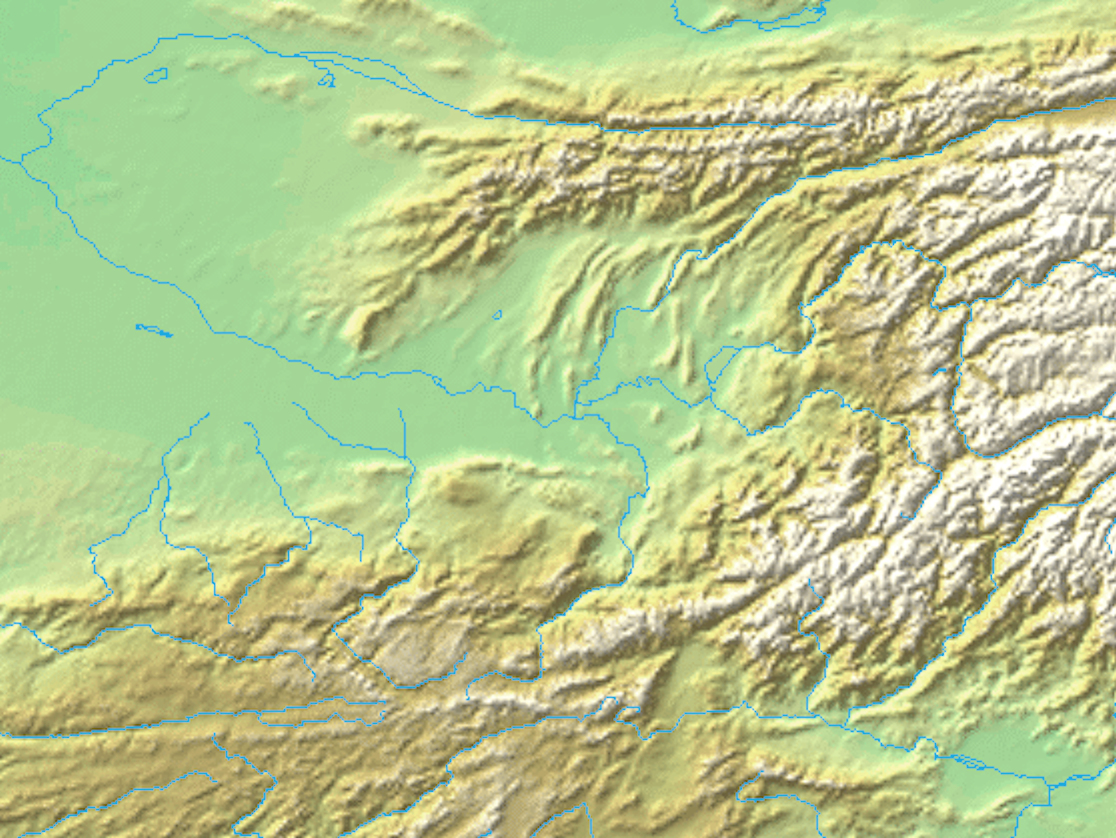
- Location within Afghanistan Location within Bactria Location within West and Central Asia Location within South Asia
- 35.759179°N 67.876073°E
- Type: Settlement
- Location: Samangan, Afghanistan

Site notes
- Excavation dates: 1928
- Condition: Ruined

Dokhtar-i-Noshirwan, also Nigar, is an archaeological site in the Ḵolm valley in northern Afghanistan. It is located 100 kilometers north of Bamiyan and has the largest non-Buddhist mural in Afghanistan.

The mural represent a local ruler, possibly Hephthalite, in an attitude similar to that of Khosrau II on one of his silver plates: seated frontally with legs spread out and his hands on a large swords standing between his knees. The crown is formed by the head of a beast, framed by two wings, similar to a design known from the coins of Shahi Tegin.

The artists of Dokhtar i-Noshirwan for may have come from Bamiyan or Kakrak.

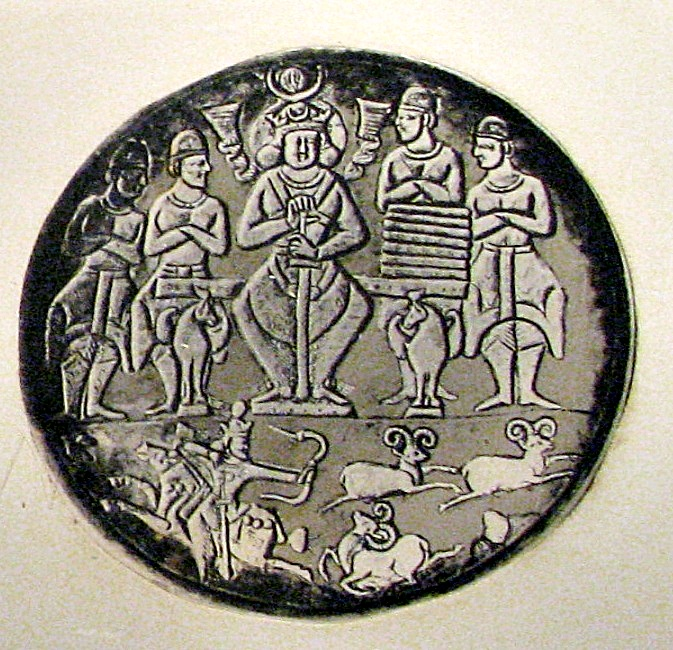
Silver plate of Khosrau I (531 to 579 CE).

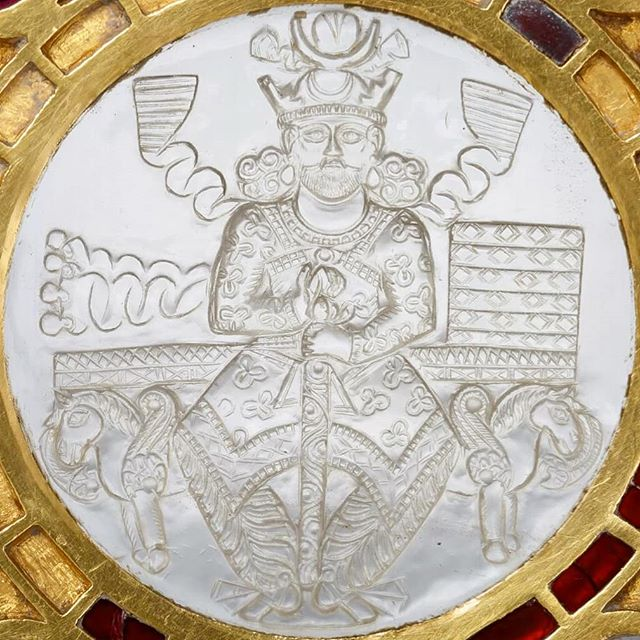
Plate depicting the Sasanian king Khosrow I (531 to 579 CE).

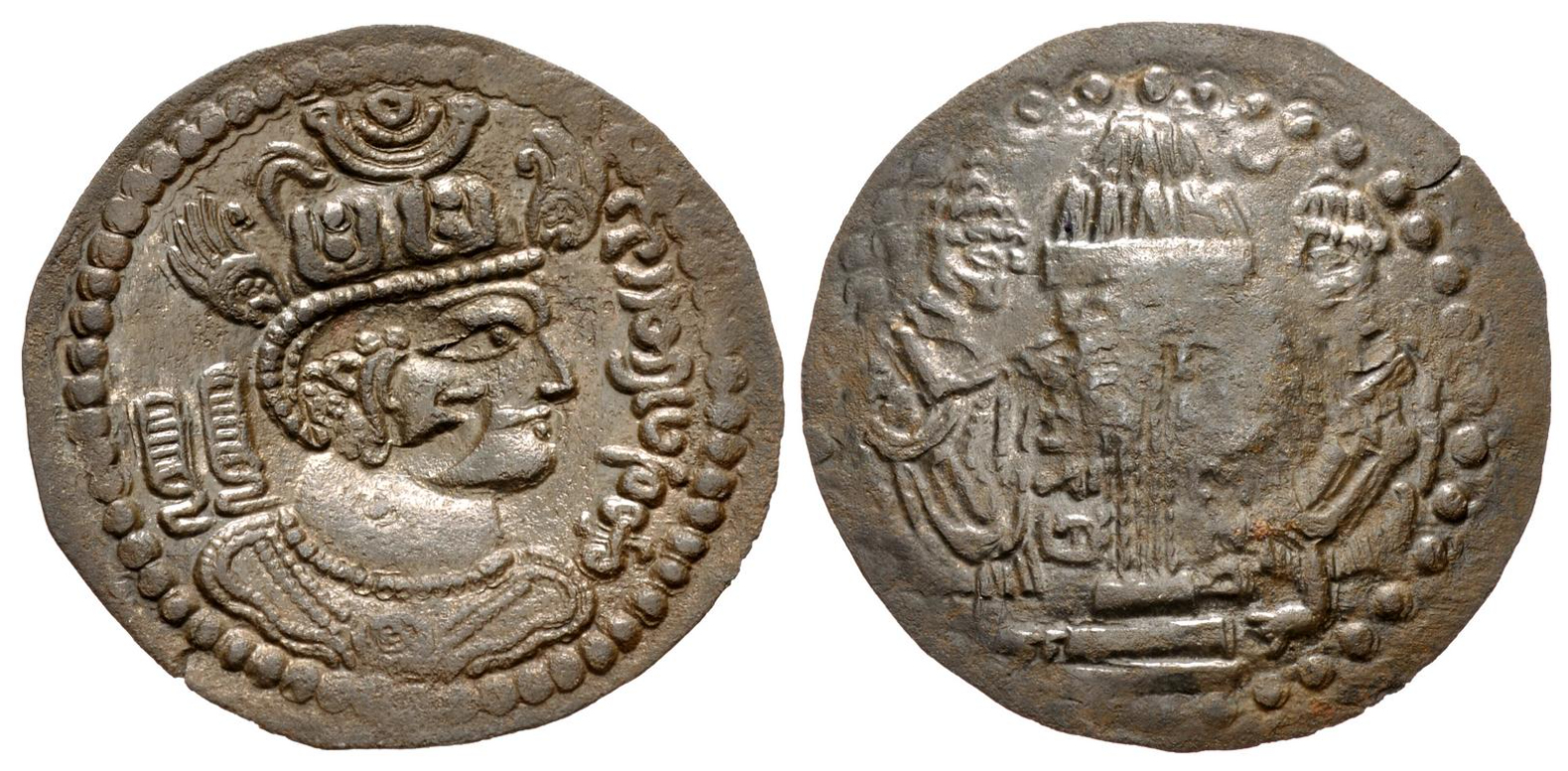
A coin of Shahi Tegin.
