= Denov =

City in Surxondaryo Region, Uzbekistan

Denov Uzbek: Denov
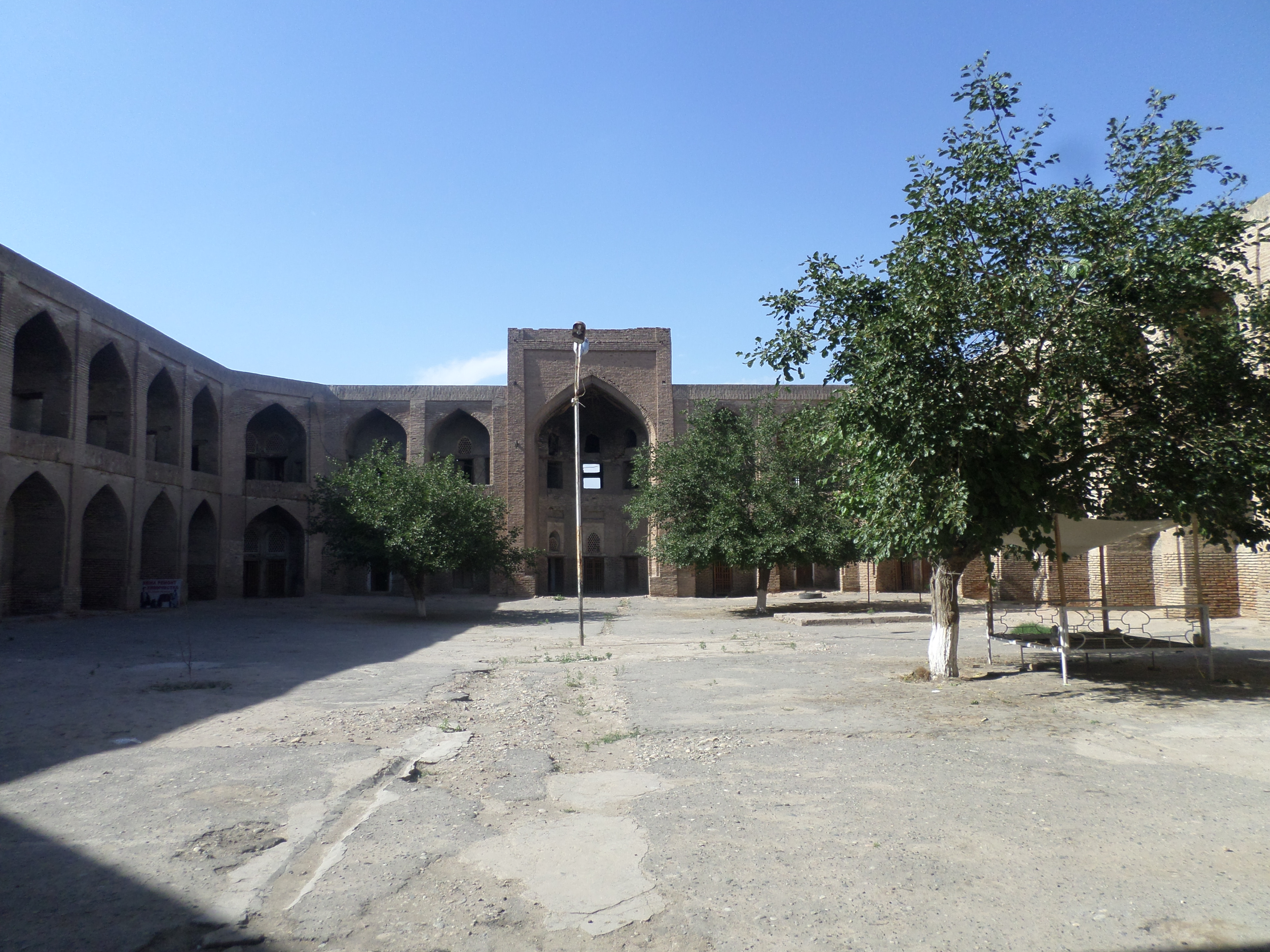

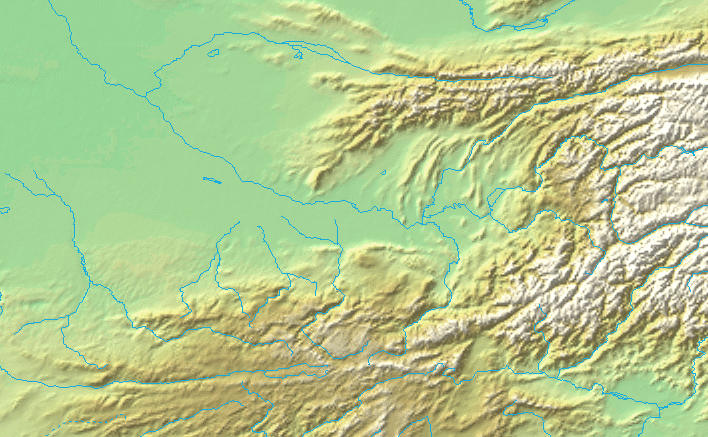
- Location in Uzbekistan Denov (West and Central Asia) Denov (Tokharistan)
- Coordinates: 38°16′N 67°54′E
- Country: Uzbekistan
- Region: Surxondaryo Region
- District: Denov District
- Town status: 1958

Population (2016)
  - Total: 78,300
- Time zone: UTC+5 (UZT)

Denov (Uzbek: Denov) is a city in Surxondaryo Region of southeast Uzbekistan, the administrative centre of Denov District. It is in the Hissar Range close to the border with Tajikistan, and is the closest major town to the Kalchayan and Dalverzin Tepe archaeological sites. Denov is believed to be the site of ancient city of Chaghaniyan.

== Etymology ==
The Uzbek name of the city comes from the Persian word "ده نو" 'Deh-e No' (in Tajik alphabet: “деҳнав”) meaning “new village”.

== Geography ==
Denov is located in a subtropical valley in a mountainous part of Uzbekistan's Surxondaryo Region with the Hissar Range to the north and east and the Chulbair Range to the west. It is close to the border with Tajikistan, on the main road to the international border crossing, and thus functions as a regional transport hub.

=== Climate ===
Denov has a semi-arid climate (Köppen: BSk) with mild winters and very hot summers.

Climate data for Denov (1991–2020)
Month	Jan	Feb	Mar	Apr	May	Jun	Jul	Aug	Sep	Oct	Nov	Dec	Year
Mean daily maximum °C (°F)	10.3 (50.5)	12.6 (54.7)	18.7 (65.7)	24.9 (76.8)	30.3 (86.5)	35.7 (96.3)	37.3 (99.1)	35.5 (95.9)	31.4 (88.5)	25.3 (77.5)	17.7 (63.9)	12.2 (54.0)	24.3 (75.7)
Daily mean °C (°F)	5.1 (41.2)	7.1 (44.8)	12.4 (54.3)	18.2 (64.8)	23.5 (74.3)	28.5 (83.3)	29.8 (85.6)	27.7 (81.9)	23.2 (73.8)	17.1 (62.8)	11.0 (51.8)	6.8 (44.2)	17.5 (63.5)
Mean daily minimum °C (°F)	1.6 (34.9)	3.0 (37.4)	7.7 (45.9)	12.9 (55.2)	17.9 (64.2)	22.5 (72.5)	23.7 (74.7)	21.6 (70.9)	17.0 (62.6)	11.4 (52.5)	6.4 (43.5)	3.1 (37.6)	12.4 (54.3)
Average precipitation mm (inches)	44.7 (1.76)	59.3 (2.33)	66.2 (2.61)	51.3 (2.02)	28.5 (1.12)	4.7 (0.19)	0.4 (0.02)	0.1 (0.00)	1.0 (0.04)	11.1 (0.44)	34.4 (1.35)	44.5 (1.75)	346.2 (13.63)
Average precipitation days (≥ 1.0 mm)	10	11	11	9	6	2	1	0	1	3	7	9	70
Source: NOAA

== Population ==
In 2011 the city population was 68,994 persons, and 78,300 in 2016. Denov is the second most populous city in Surxondaryo Region after Termiz and the 15th in Uzbekistan. It is among the largest districts of the Republic.The city is mainly inhabited by Uzbeks. There is a large minority of Tajiks, Sogutarosh (one of the groups of Tajik-speaking Romani people), Russians, Tatars, Koreans, Uyghurs and representatives of other nationalities.

Historical population
Year	Pop.	±% p.a.
1970	25,000	—
1989	46,881	+3.36%
2000	63,000	+2.72%
2011	68,994	+0.83%
2016	78,300	+2.56%

== Economy ==
Denov's economy revolves around cross-border trade with Tajikistan and agriculture from the surrounding hinterland.

The climate in the valley is mild, and so the land around Denov is used successfully for producing wine, as well as growing a variety of other agricultural plants. Cross border trade with Tajikistan is another important part of the local economy.

The town has a cotton ginning, oil extraction, brick, auto repair, and distillery plants, as well as an oil terminal.

The only place in the former Soviet Union where sugarcane was grown and rum was produced. The city has the largest bazaar in Surxondaryo Region.

Developed service sector, including catering establishments, individual tailoring, shoe repair, etc.

An inter-district newspaper Chaganiyon is published in Denov. There is a local television station.

There is a bus station with departure of buses around the district, to district centers of Surxondaryo Region, to the nearest regional centers, including Tashkent.

The station building is located on the line connecting the capital of Tajikistan, Dushanbe, with other cities, including Russia.

And since February 2011 the Denov - Tashkent flight was opened, passing through the new railway track Qumqoʻrgʻon - Boysun - Tashguzar. There are 2 hotels, including "Hotel Eurasia".

Recently, tourists from different countries transit through Denov every year, traveling through Uzbekistan, continuing on their way to neighboring Tajikistan. The flow of transit tourists is growing every year.

== Main sites ==
=== Sayyid Atalik Madrasa ===
Dating from the 16th century, the Sayyid Atalik Madrasa is one of the largest madrasas in Central Asia. It was described a century later by the Balkh historian Mahmund ibn-Vali in his geographical encyclopedia. From this account we know that the madrasa was initially part of a larger architectural ensemble, but the other buildings have not survived.

In the centre of the madrassa is a large building on the north–south axis, and there are arches surrounding the courtyard. The niche in the portal is unusual in that it is built on a semi-octahedron plan. There are also a series of low cupolas and some attractive ghanch decoration inside.

The Sayyid Atalik Madrasa operated as a religious school until 1935, when it was closed by the Soviets. It reopened briefly from 1991 to 1997, then closed for renovation. It is now classed as a historic monument rather than a religious building, and it is therefore possible for the public (including non-Muslims) to visit.

=== R Shreder Dendrarium ===
Located just south of Denov's centre is the R Shreder Dendrarium, an arboretum housing more than 1,000 species of native and non-native plants. The plants were collected by scientists, and also received as gifts from official visitors. As well as common trees, herbs, and flowers indigenous to Uzbekistan, the non-native species grown here range from kauchuk (natural rubber) and bamboo, to sequoia and a notable collection of persimmons.

=== Fortress of Yurchi ===
Dating from the 10th century, the ruined Fortress of Yurchi is located 8 km from Denov on the road towards Termez. The fortress was made from mud bricks and once had an impressive tower, though not much now remains.

=== Kalchayan ===
Kalchayan was a Graeco-Bactrian city, and it was first settled in the 4th century BC. It is 10 km northeast of the modern settlement of Denov and was excavated in the mid 20th century by Soviet archaeologist Professor Galina Pugachenkova. Pugachenkova and her colleagues found large quantities of Kushan-era sculptures with lifelike features: the hairstyles, dress, and ethnic features of Kalchayan's ancient inhabitants are clearly depicted. These sculptures and other important archaeological finds from Kalchayan are on display at the Termez Archaeological Museum and the State Fine Art Museum in Tashkent.

=== Dalverzin Tepe ===
Dalverzin Tepe is a major archeological site between Denov and Termez. It was founded as a fortress in a Hellenistic style, and by the 1st century BC had grown into a substantial city. Dalverzin Tepe flourished under the Kushan Empire, and some superb examples of Kushan art have been excavated from the site, including wall paintings, gold decorations, and statues.

There are also the remains of a Buddhist temple.

== See also ==
- Surxondaryo Region
- Uzbekistan
- Denov District
- Hissar Range
- Tajikistan
- Khalchayan
- Dalverzin Tepe
- Said Otaliq Madrasa
