= Dalverzin Tepe =

Bactrian archaeological site

Coordinates: 38°06′04″N 67°51′38″E

Dalverzin Tepe

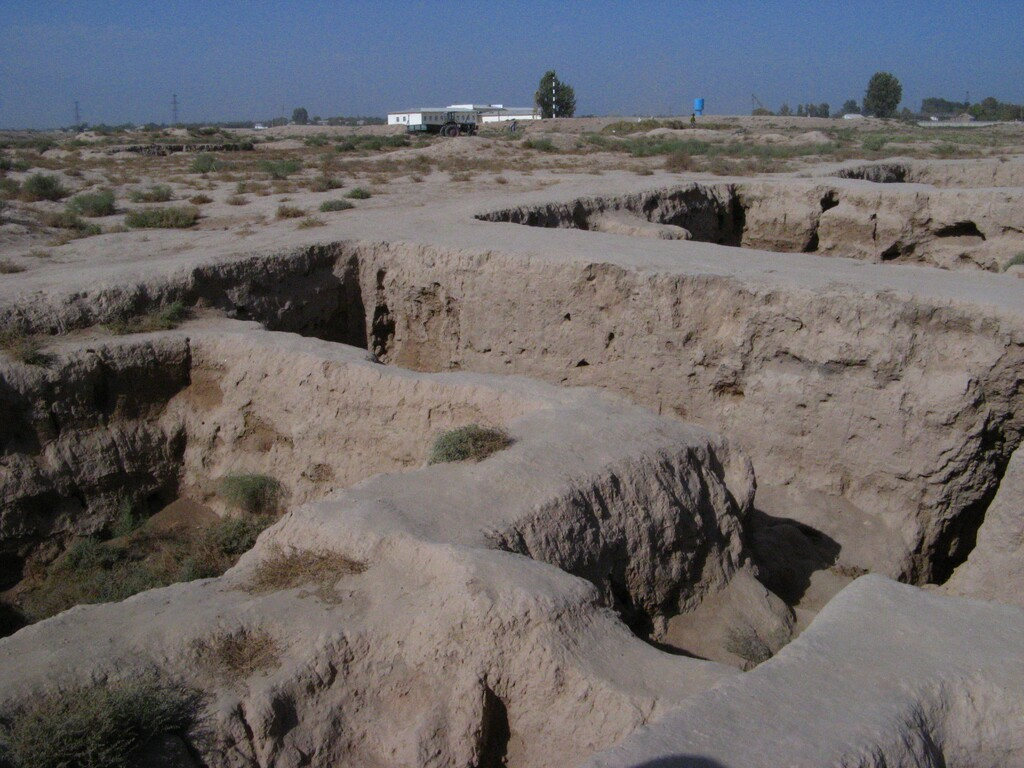
Archaeological site of Dalverzin Tepe.

Location of Dalverzin Tepe
Dalverzin Tepe (Uzbekistan)
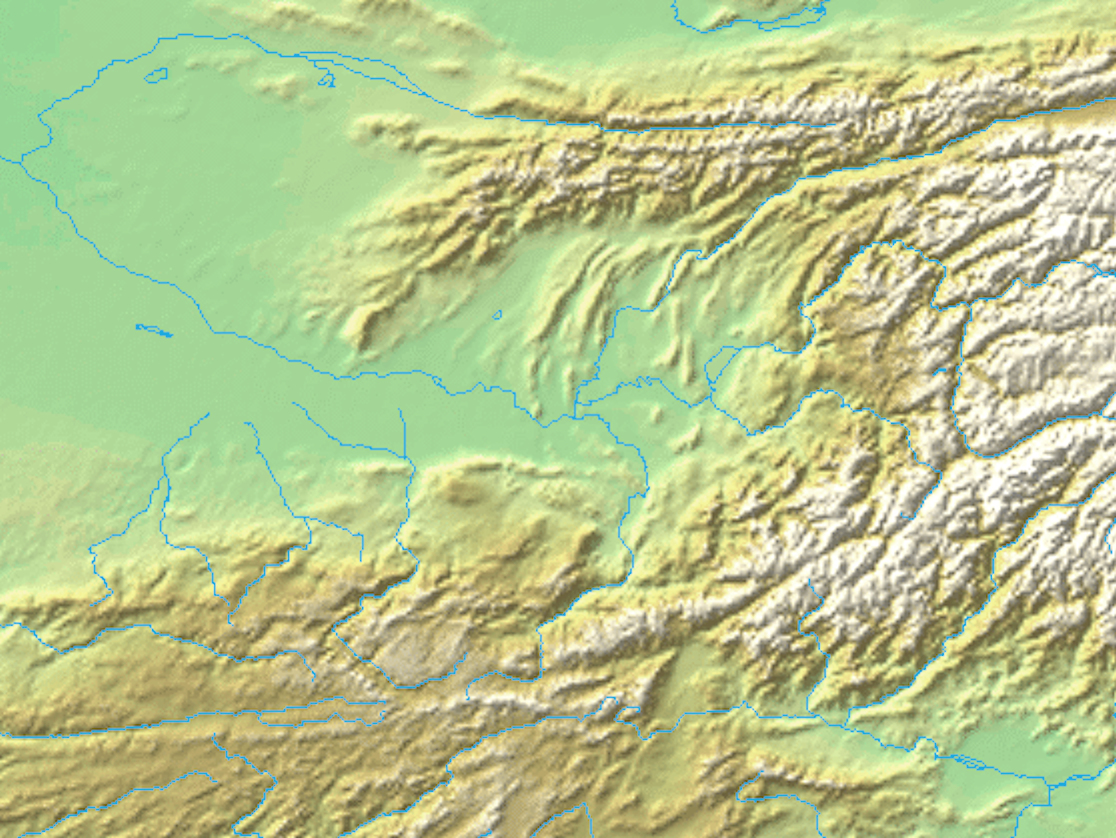
Dalverzin Tepe (Bactria)

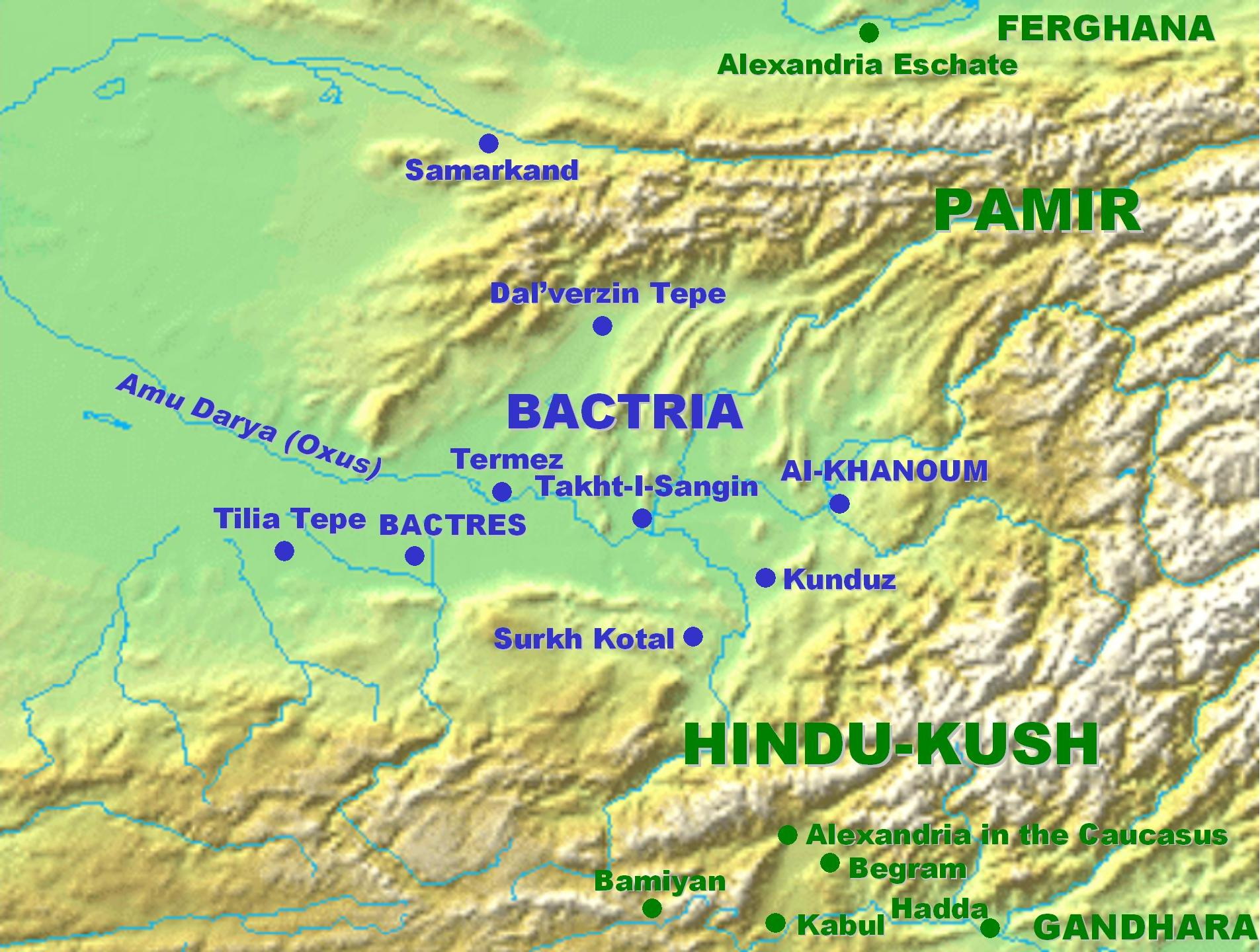
Dalverzin Tepa is located in the northern portion of Bactria.

Dalverzin Tepe is an ancient archaeological site founded by the Graeco-Bactrian Kingdom and located near to the modern city of Denau in the Surxondaryo Region of Uzbekistan. The city was founded in the 3rd century BC and rose to prominence in the Kushan period when two important Buddhist temples were built here. Dalverzin Tepe was excavated by the famed Soviet archeologist Galina Pugachenkova.

== History ==
Delverzin Tepe was a Hellenistic settlement founded by the Graeco-Bactrians in the 3rd century BC. Built on the northern bank of the Amu Darya, it was originally a small, fortified town constructed around a central citadel.

In the Kushan period (1st - 3rd centuries AD), Delverzin Tepe grew and flourished under the Kushans. Galina Pugachenkova believes that Delverzin Tepe was the original capital of the Kushan Empire. The original citadel was rebuilt and the walls were strengthened, making the fortifications twice as thick. Key features from this time include large houses built around a central hall; two Buddhist temples decorated with terracotta sculptures; two more temples dedicated to local goddesses; and a potters’ quarter with workshops and kilns.

Delverzin Tepe came under the control of the Hephthalites in the 5th and 6th centuries. However, the city and its temples were already in decline, the thick city walls were mostly used for burials. After the Muslim conquest in the 8th century, the site was completely abandoned.

== Site layout ==
Delverzin Tepe was a rectangular city with a citadel at its center and buildings laid out around that in parallel rows. In the early Kushan period, it covered an area of 650 m x 500 m. The city had different zones, each with a different purpose, including administrative-military, residential, religious, and manufacturing zones. Buildings were typically made of unbaked clay bricks, with wooden beams to support the ceilings. Grander houses would have had a columned entrance, a vestibule, living and working quarters, and a domestic sanctuary. A system of underground aqueducts supplied each house with water. On the outskirts of the city was a potters’ quarter.

== Archaeological excavations ==
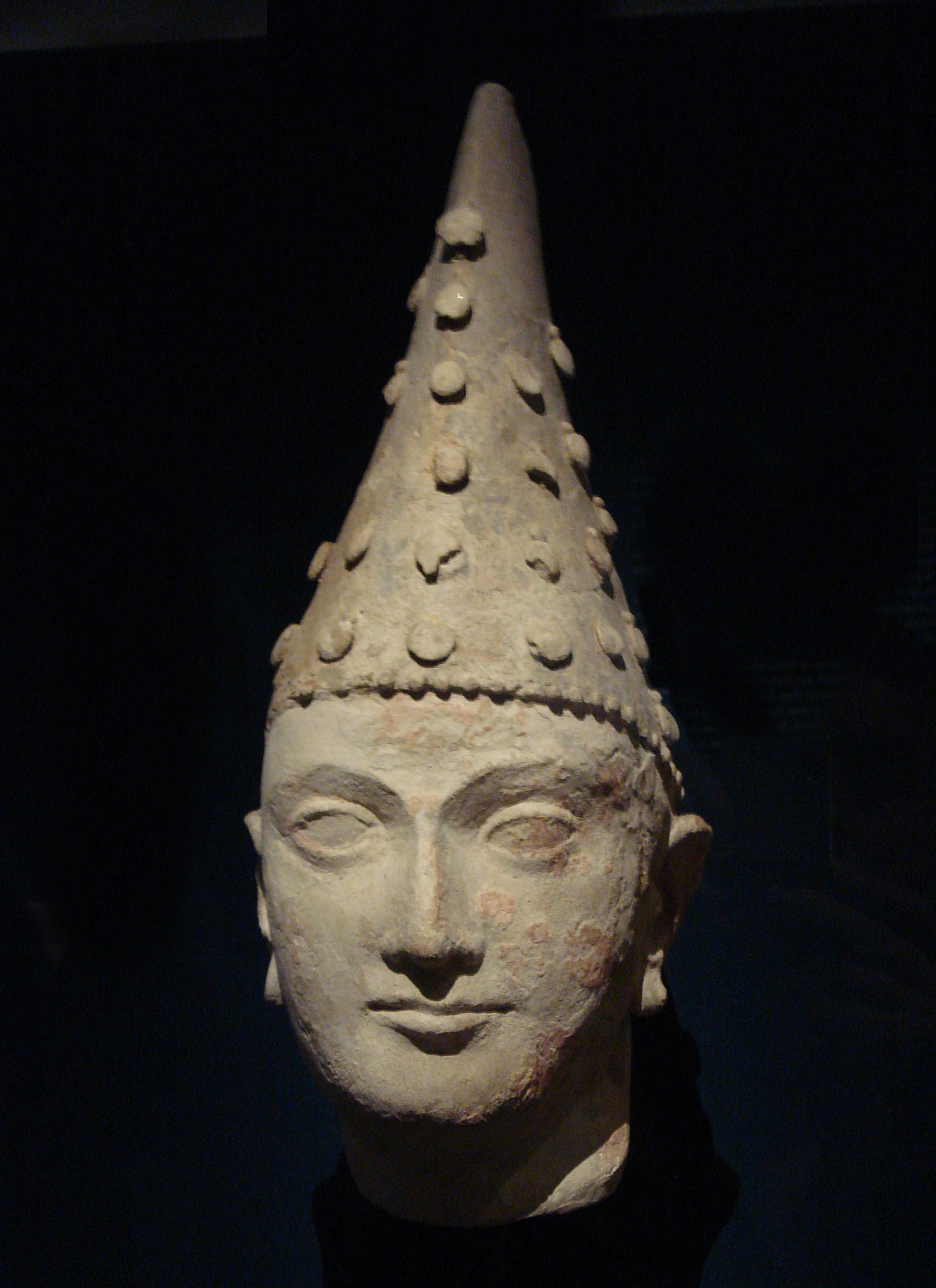
Head of a Kushan Prince, 1st-2nd century CE.

Delverzin Tepe was discovered by the Soviet archaeologist LI Al’baum in 1949. It was then excavated by Galina Pugachenkova in the 1960s and 1970s, and by BA Turgunov in the 1980s.

The first Buddhist complex was excavated in 1967-68. It included a large platform which might have been the base of a stupa, surrounded by a corridor and multiple rooms with fragmentary sculptures of Boddhisatvas and secondary deities. A second Buddhist complex was discovered by Turgunov. Samples taken from the floor date this second temple to 320-410 AD, but its structure is not clear.

=== Gold treasure (1st century CE) ===
A gold treasure was discovered in 1972 in one of the buildings of Dalverzin Tepe. It is the largest gold treasure ever discovered in Central Asia, with 115 objects weighing 36 kilograms in total. The treasure is dated to the 1st century CE, and was buried in the early 2nd century CE. The main objects are circular and parallelepipedic ingots, followed by various decorative objects and jewelry items. Many of the ingots bear inscriptions in Kharoshthi mentioning their weight and the god Mitra (protector of contractuel relations), and are related to the monetary system of the Kushan Empire. The jewelry too is related to the Kushan Empire, and mainly reflect the styles seen in Gandharan art. Both locally and imported gems were found, as well as full sets of Kushan ceramics.

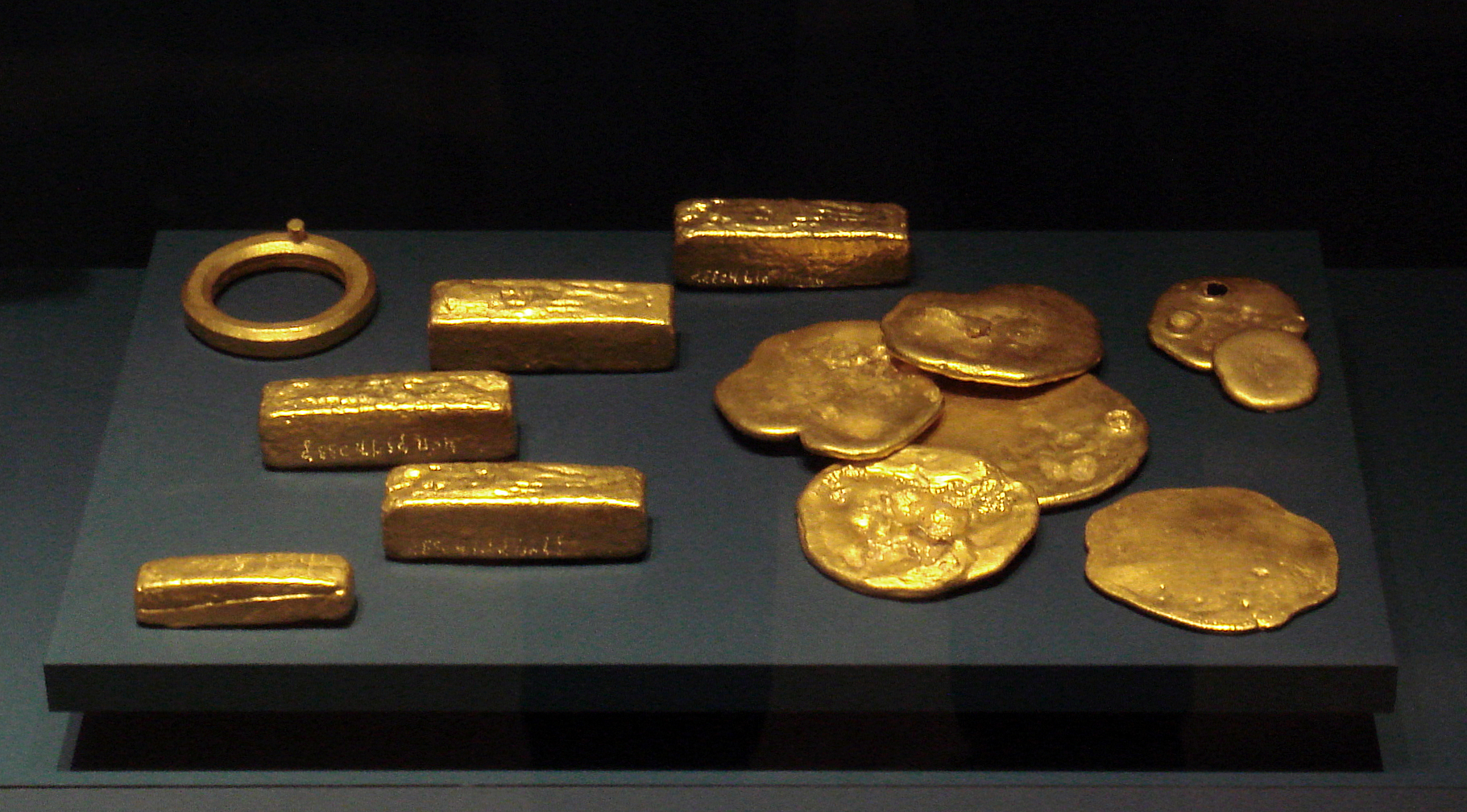
Dalverzin-Tepe treasure, 1st century CE

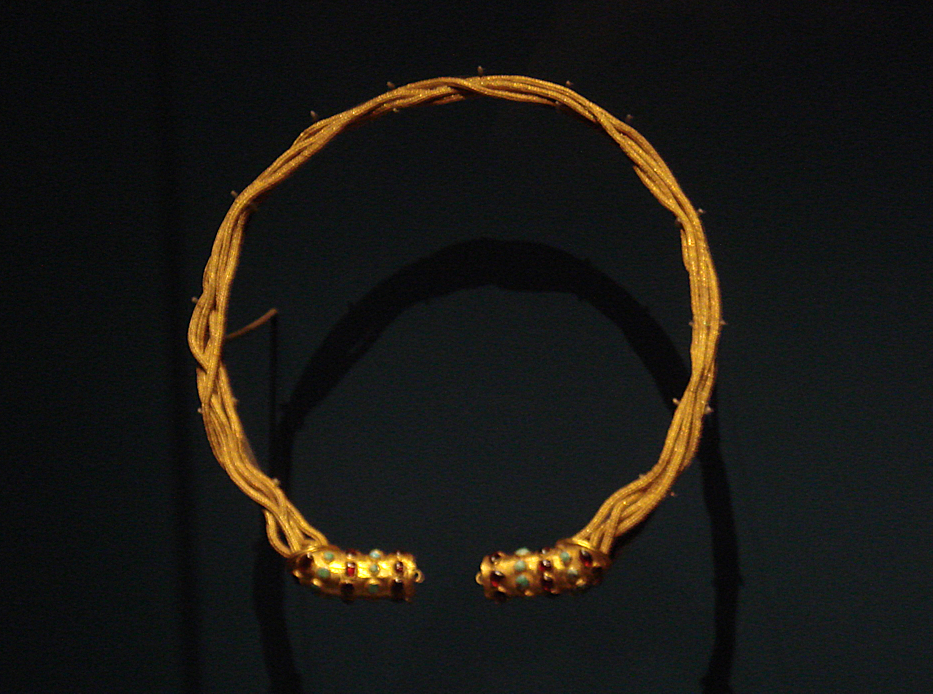
Dalverzin-Tepe treasure (torque), 1st century CE

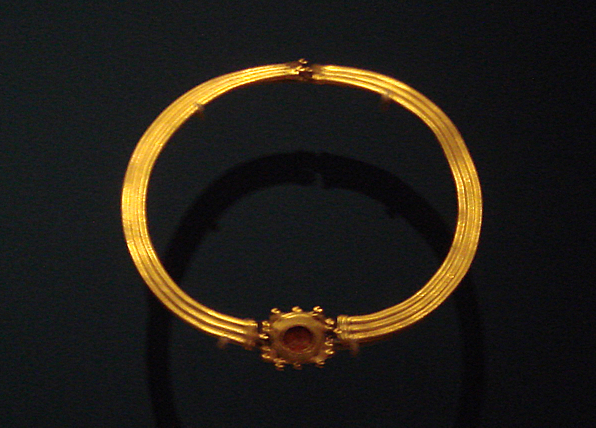
Dalverzin-Tepe treasure (necklace), 1st century CE

Archeologists at Delverzin Tepe also excavated numerous copper and gold coins with images of deities and bearded kings. Inscriptions are mostly in Greek and Indian languages, but some are inscribed with an unknown language written in the Greek script. The coins date from the 1st to 7th century AD.

=== Buddhist works of art ===
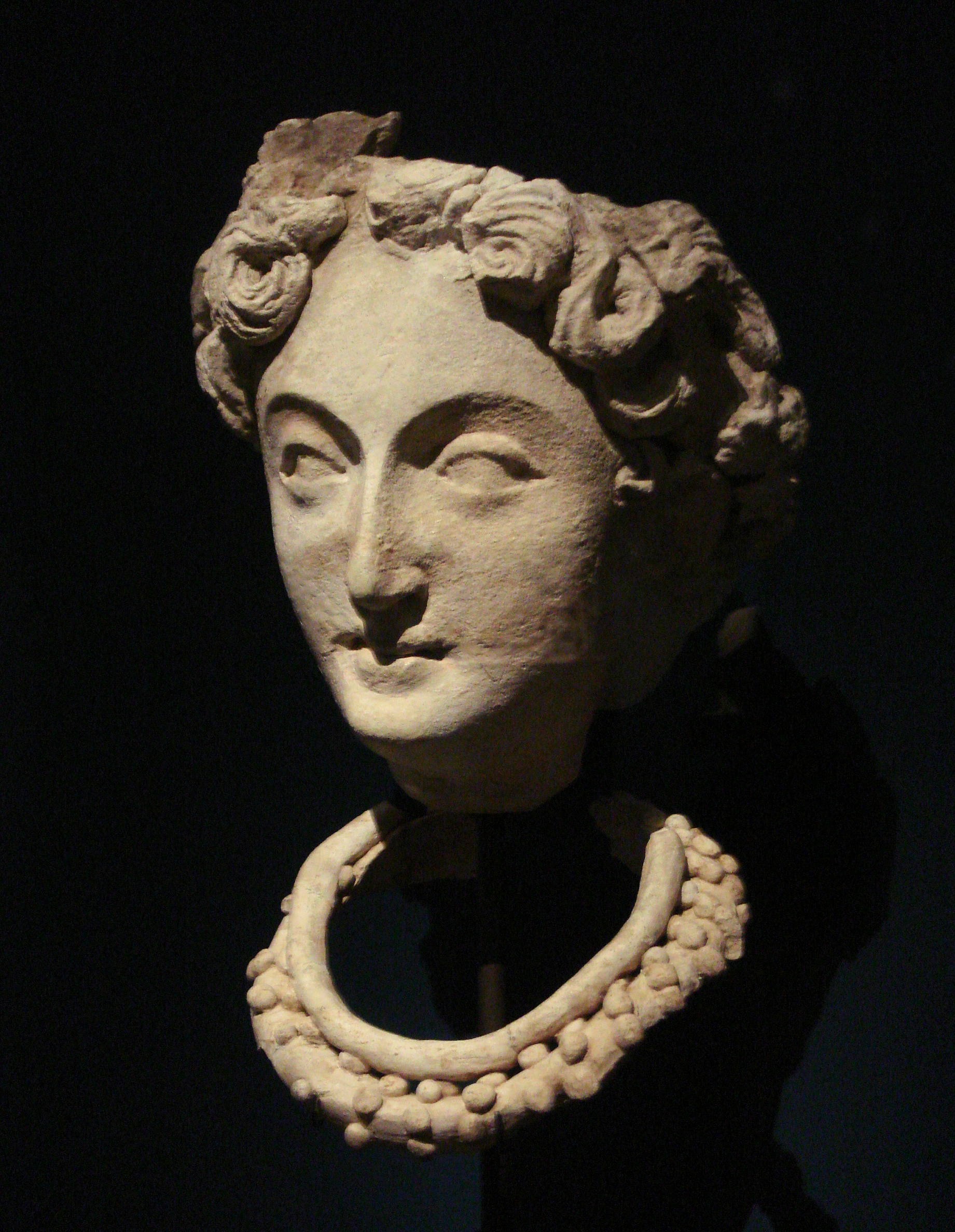
Buddhist devata, Dalverzin Tepe, 1st-2nd century CE

Numerous Buddhist sculptures were discovered in these two temple complexes. They were made from unbaked clay, which was plastered and then painted. Many of the figures are similarly dressed to those found at Khalchayan and they show two distinct stylistic influences, from Gandhara and other from the more local Graeco-Iranian tradition. Two small figurines, an elephant and a bull, date from the 1st or 2nd century AD. It has been hypothesised that these are chess pieces: if that is indeed the case, they are roughly 400 years older than the previously assumed date for the invention of chess.

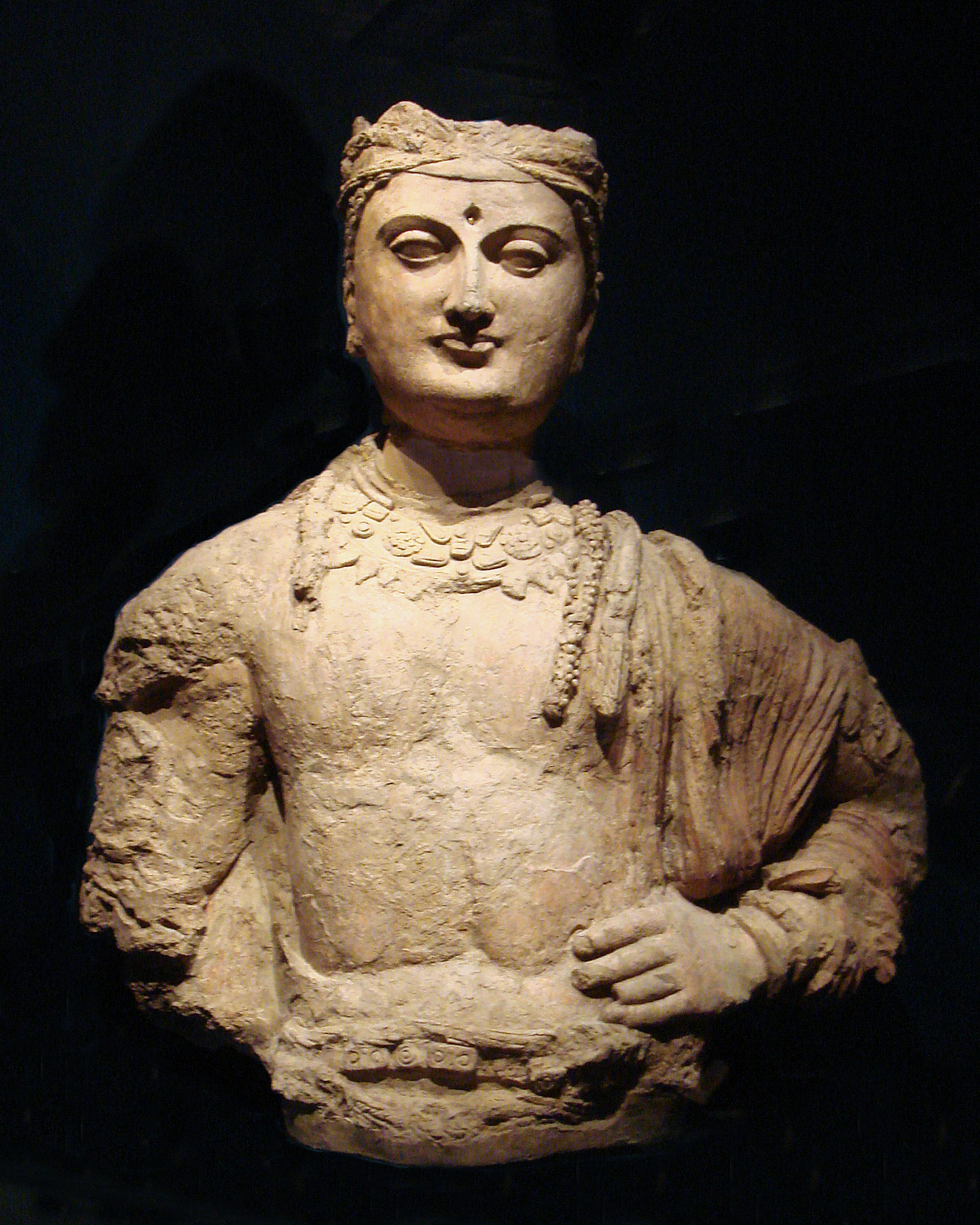
Monumental Bodhisattava, from Dalverzin tepe, 2nd-3rd century CE

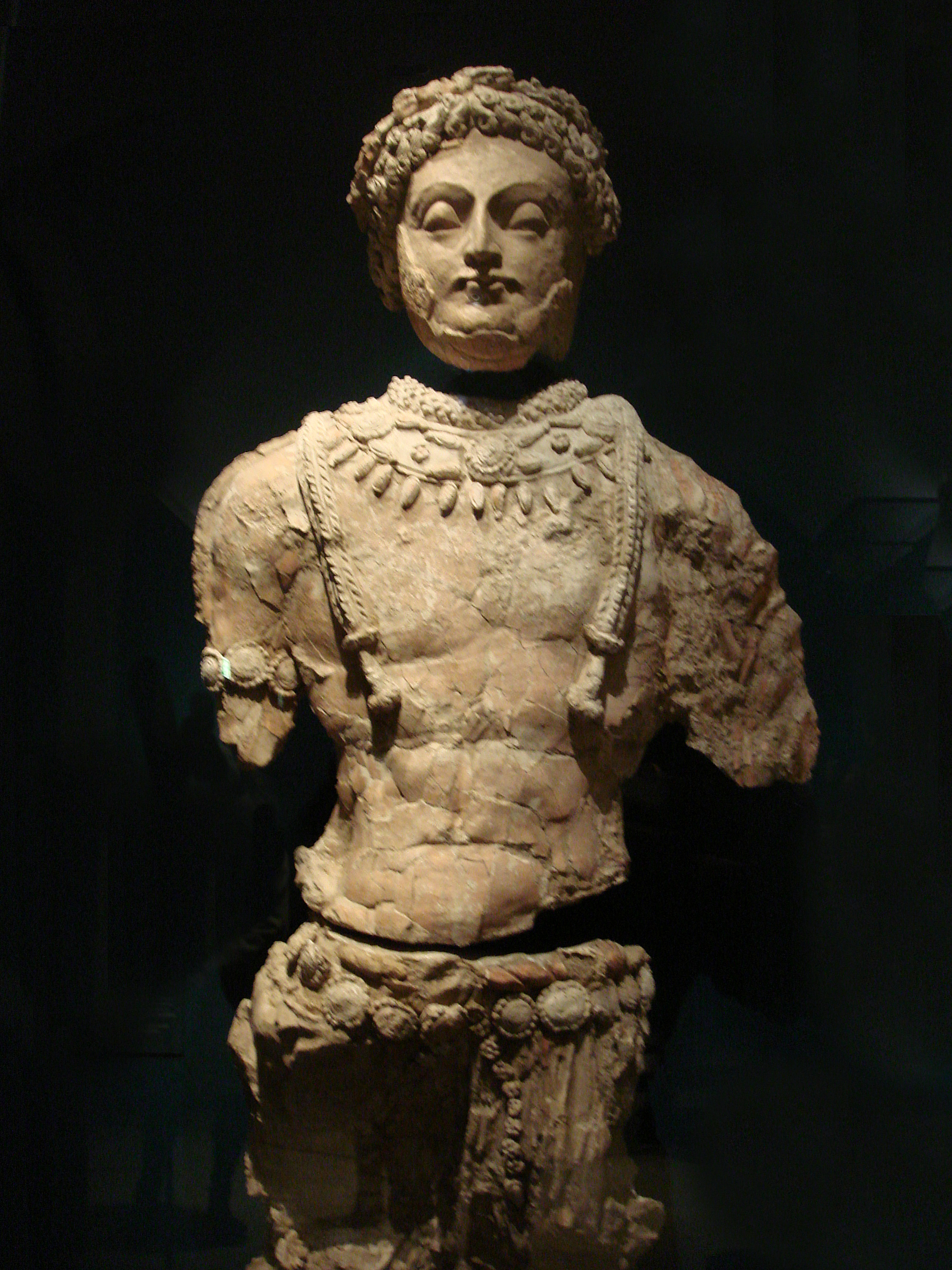
Monumental Bodhisattava, Dalverzin tepe, 2nd-3rd century CE

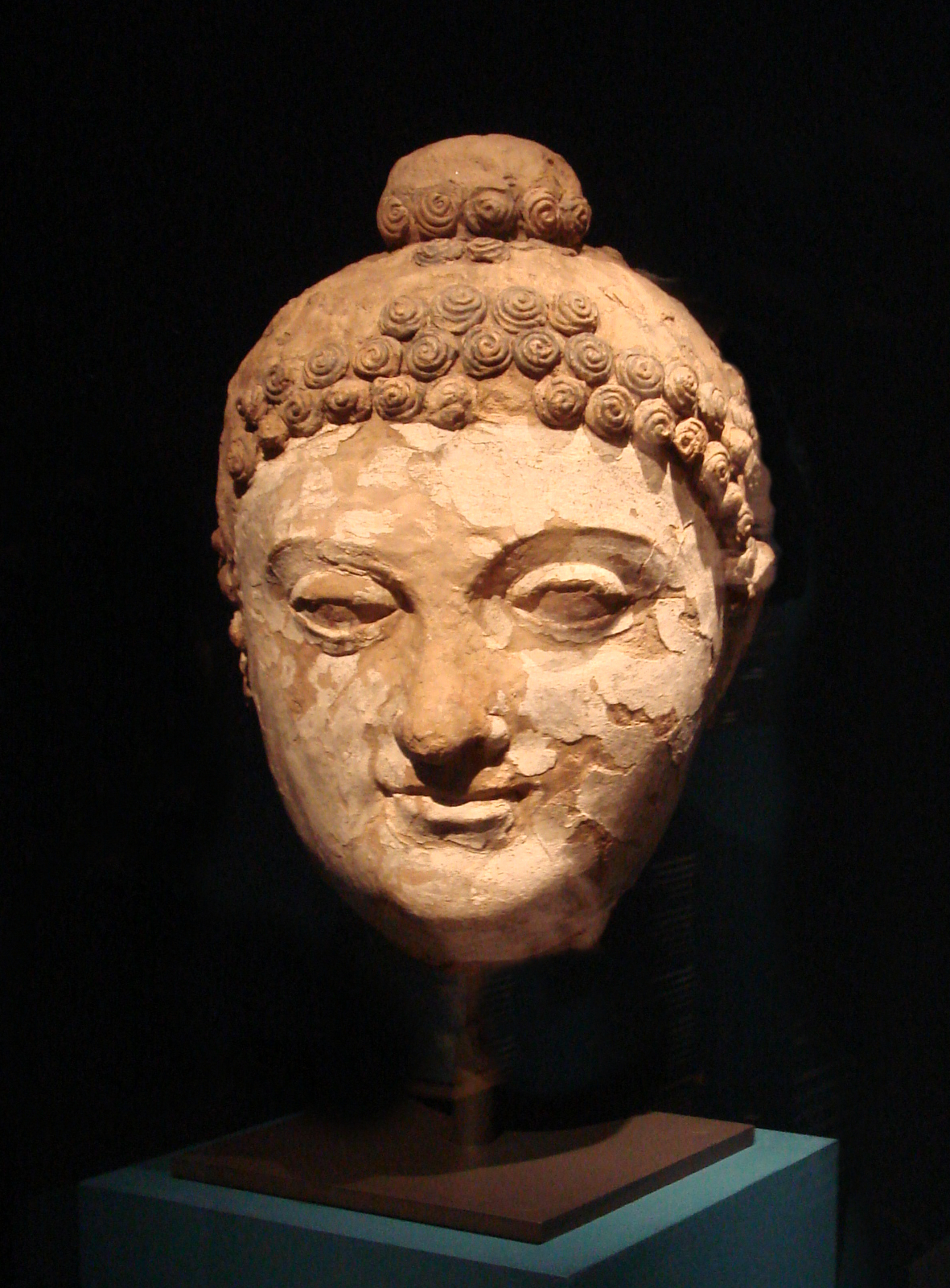
Buddha, Dalverzin Tepe.

=== Other works of art ===
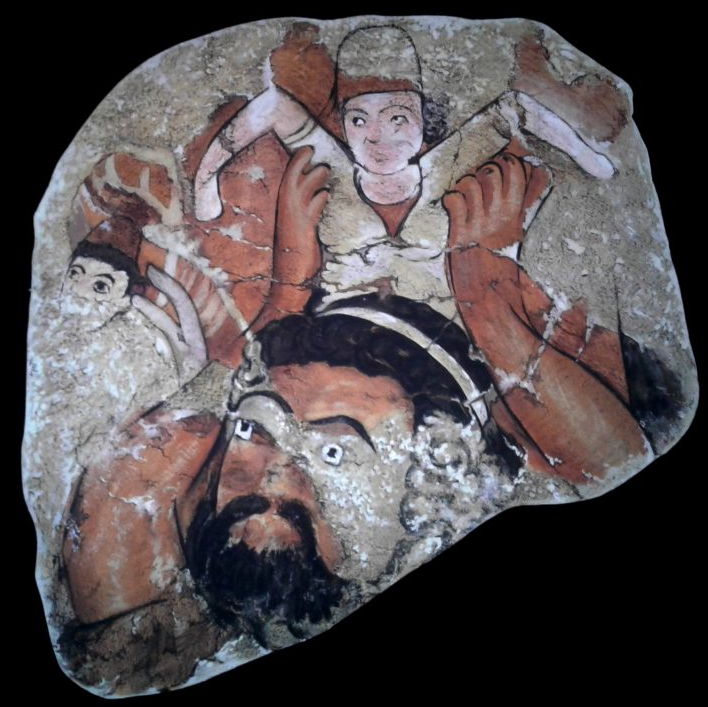
Fresco with ritual scene.

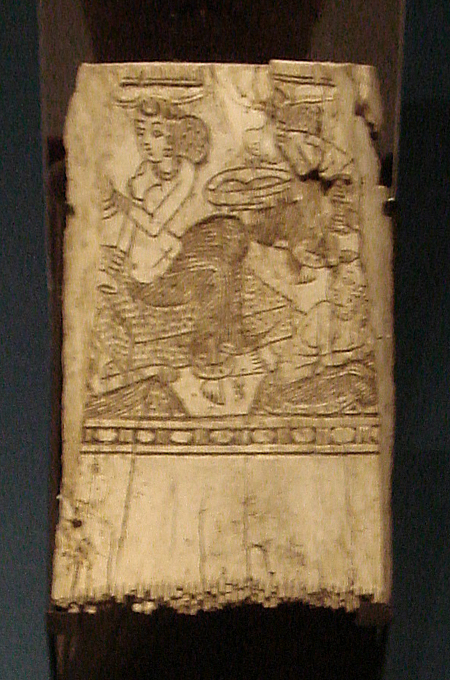
Indian ivory comb, Dalverzin tepe, 2nd-3rd century CE
