= Denov District =

Coordinates: 38.2667°N 67.8833°E

Denov
- District
- Denov tumani
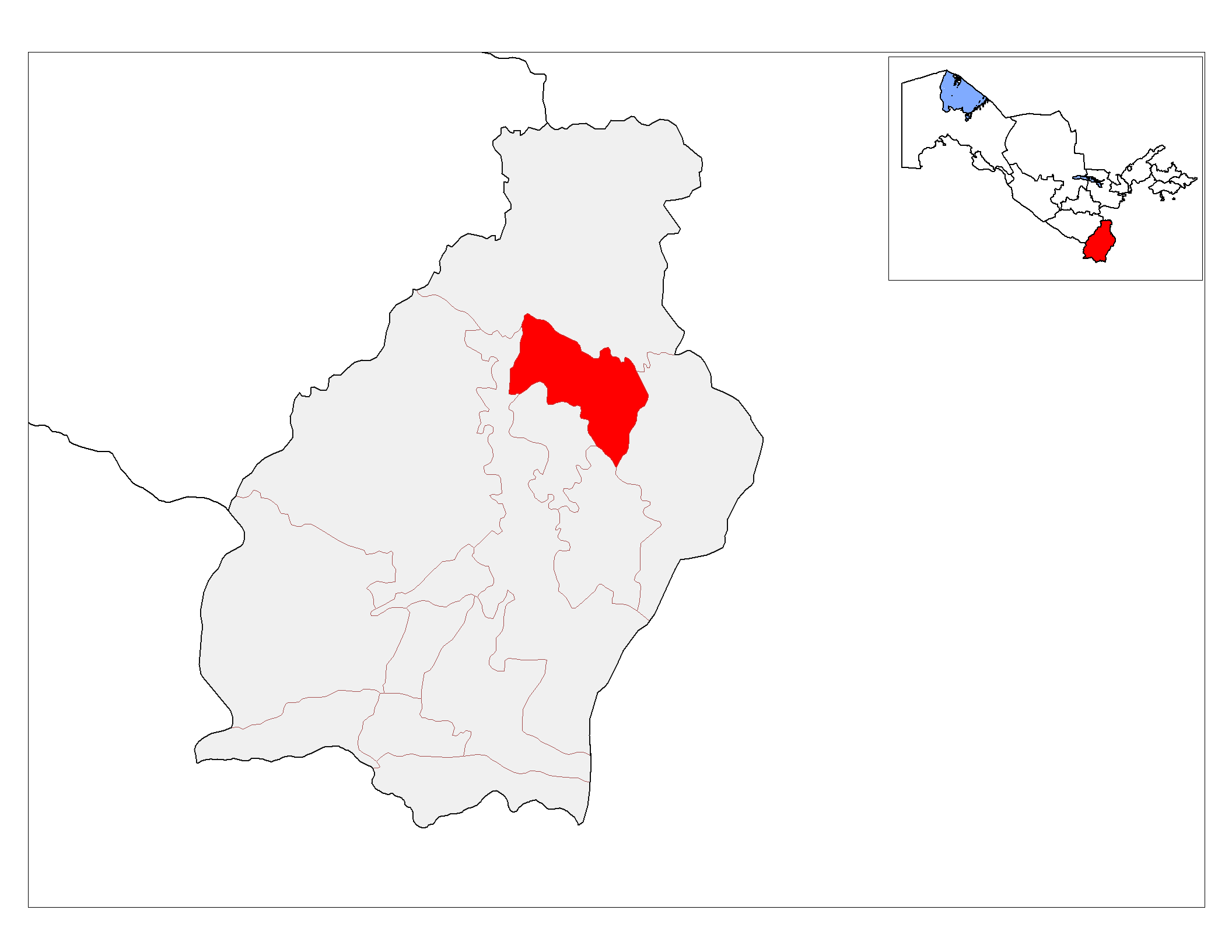
- Country: Uzbekistan
- Region: Surxondaryo Region
- Capital: Denov
- Established: 1926

Area
  - Total: 760 km^{2} (290 sq mi)

Population (2021)
  - Total: 392,200
  - Density: 520/km^{2} (1,300/sq mi)
- Time zone: UTC+5 (UZT)

Denov is a district of Surxondaryo Region in Uzbekistan. The capital lies at the city Denov. It has an area of 760 km^{2} (290 sq mi) and ts population is 392,200 (2021 est.).

The district consists of one city (Denov), 12 urban-type settlements (Doʻstlik, Yurchi, Qiziljar, Xolchayon, Xitoyan, Paxtakurash, Namozgoh, Jamatak, Yangi Hazorbogʻ, Yangibogʻ, Dahana, Yangiobod) and 17 rural communities (Anbarsoy, Denov, Kenagas, Qiziljar, Fargʻona, Tortuvli, Pistamozor, Sina, Xayrabot, Hazarbogʻ, Xolchayon, Yangibogʻ, Yangizamon, Yurchi, Yangiobod, Binokor, Dahana).

== Education ==
There is one institutions of higher education:

- Denau Institute of Entrepreneurship and Pedagogy
