= Said Otaliq Madrasa =

Madrasa in Denov, Surxondaryo, Uzbekistan

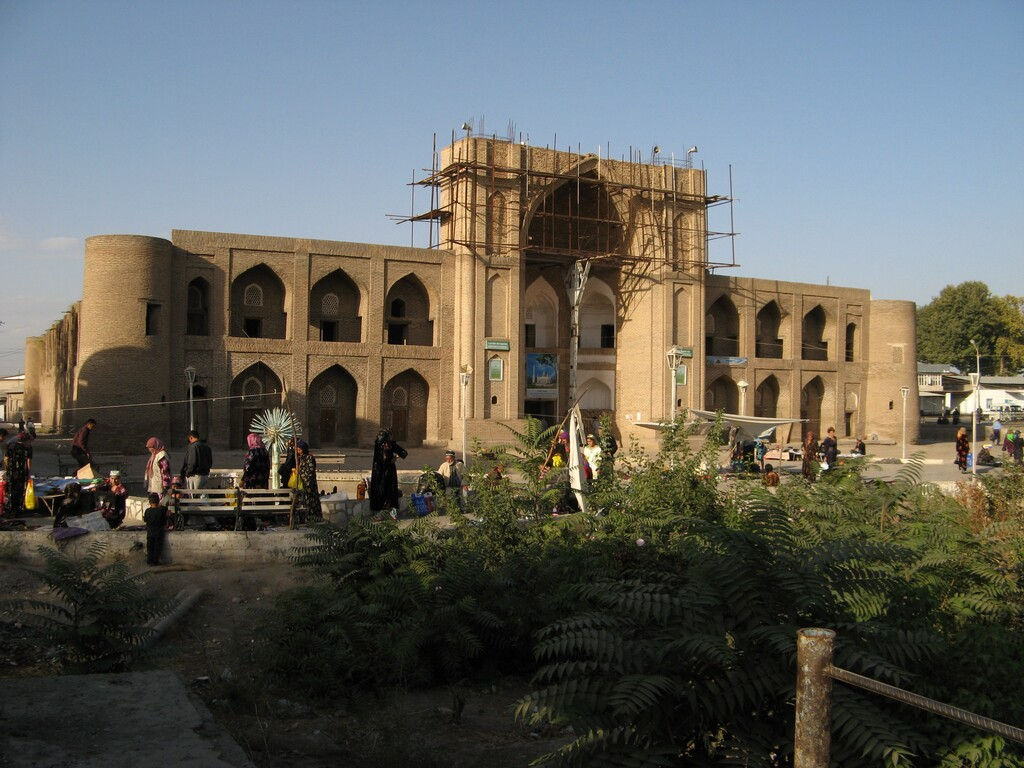

Religion
- Affiliation: Islam
- District: Denov
- Region: Surxondaryo Region
- Ecclesiastical or organizational status: Under state protection
- Ownership: State property, operated and managed by the cultural heritage department of the Surxondarya Region

Location
- Location: Mustaqillik Street
- Country: Uzbekistan
- Interactive map of Said Otaliq Madrasa

Architecture
- Architect: Ahmad Mamat Buxoriy
- Style: Central Asian architecture
- Creator: Said Otaliq (or Sayyid Atalik)
- Funded by: Said Otaliq
- Materials: Brick

Said Otaliq Madrasa (Note: Alternatively transliterated into English as Sayid Atalik Madrasah or other variants thereof. The Uzbek government lists the building's Uzbek name as 'Said Otaliq madrasasi'.) is a two-story madrasa (Islamic school) located on Mustaqillik Street in the center of Denov, a city in Uzbekistan's Surxondaryo Region.

The building's architecture is similar to other large Bukhara-style madrasas such as Kukeldash Madrasah, but is unique among madrasas in the Surxondaryo Region. It is included on Uzbekistan's national list of sites with significant cultural heritage value. Currently, however, the madrasa is in poor condition and may be on the verge of structural collapse.

== History ==
The details and dates surrounding Said Otaliq Madrasa's original construction appear to be disputed. Some sources, citing the historical text Fathnomayi sultoniy by Mir Olim Buxoriy, state that the madrasa was built in the 19th century and was designed by master architect Ahmad Mamat Buxoriy. The madrasa was supposedly constructed under the patronage of Said Otaliq, the father-in-law of the then-Emir of Bukhara, Haydar bin Shahmurad. Said Otaliq also served as governor of Denov for several years. Other sources, however, claim that the madrasa is named after the late Naqshbandi Sheikh Hazrat Xoja Alouddin Attor, who died in Denov in 1400 AD. The official Uzbek government's heritage list describes Said Otaliq Madrasa as being built in the "16th century," which aligns with various other claims that the school was originally built by descendants of Alouddin Attor between the 15th and 17th centuries.

Before the Bukharan Revolution, about 400 students attended the madrasa, taught by 33 instructors. The madrasa was closed during the Soviet era. In 1956–1960 and 1972–1973, it was studied by scientists of the Uzbekistan SSR. Sometime after 1991, under the initiative of Hoji Luqmonxon Haydarxon oʻgʻli, 4–year education of students at the madrasa was restarted, but today, the madrasa is clearly no longer functioning as an Islamic educational institution. Local investigations done in 2018–2020, found that the madrasa building was on the verge of collapse, with significant visible cracks and some rooms already partly-caved in. The madrasa was included on the 2019 national list of "Real Estate Objects of Tangible Cultural Heritage", and constructing a craft center there has been proposed. In 2020, the Uzbek government made plans to preserve the madrasa, add utilities and communication services to the building, and repair nearby roads. The repair work's projected completion date was March–April 2021.

== Architecture ==
The madrasa's architectural style reflects the traditions of its time. Its courtyard consists of large and small rooms on both the first and second floors. Behind the façade is a main room, and the building also contains a mosque and several classrooms, all underneath a vaulted roof. The corners of the madrasa were decorated with bouquets. Two 40 by 29.5-meter terraces sit in the yard. The building's foundation is 5.5 metres (18 ft) deep. Many of the decorative patterns on the windows, arches, and façades were made using ganch carving, a plaster-like art style that has a strong cultural legacy in Uzbekistan.
