= Doʻstlik, Surxondaryo Region =

Doʻstlik
- urban-type settlement
- Location in Uzbekistan
- Coordinates: 38°10′34″N 67°53′26″E
- Country: Uzbekistan
- Region: Surxondaryo Region
- District: Denov District
- Urban-type settlement: 1992

Population (1999)
  - Total: 3,400
- Time zone: UTC+5 (UZT)

Doʻstlik (Uzbek: Doʻstlik, Russian: Дустлик) is an urban-type settlement in Surxondaryo Region, Uzbekistan. It is part of Denov District. The town population in 1999 was 3,400 people.
