= Khalchayan =

Archaeological site near Denov, Uzbekistan

Coordinates: 38°17′37″N 67°58′44″E

Khalchayan

Reconstruction of the outside of the Khalchayan hall, by Stawisky, 1976.

Reconstruction of Khalchayan, by Pugachenkova, 1994. The in-the-round sculptures of Yuezhi dignitaries ligned the topmost part of the wall of the main hall.

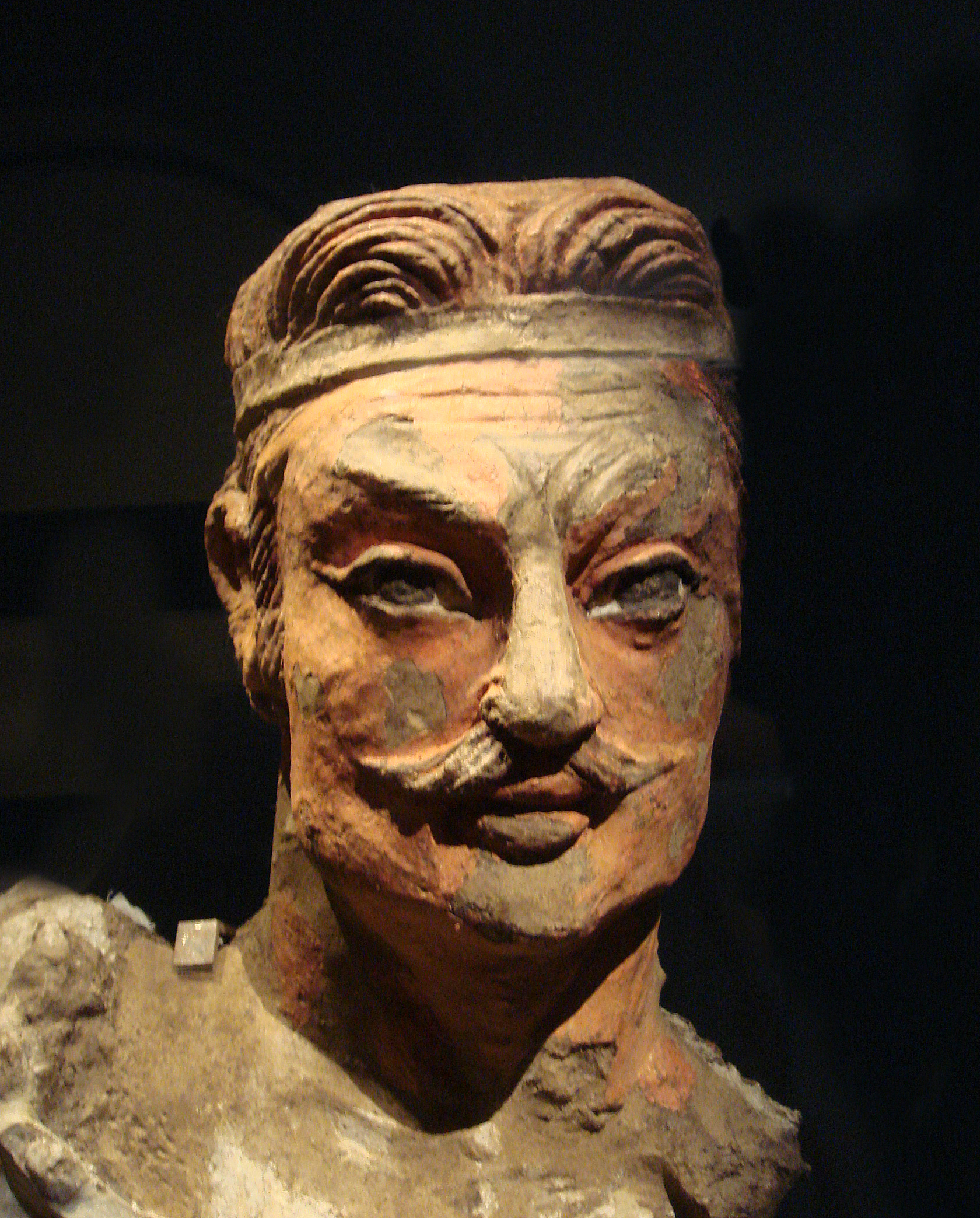
Head of a Yuezhi prince (Khalchayan palace, Uzbekistan). 1st century BCE

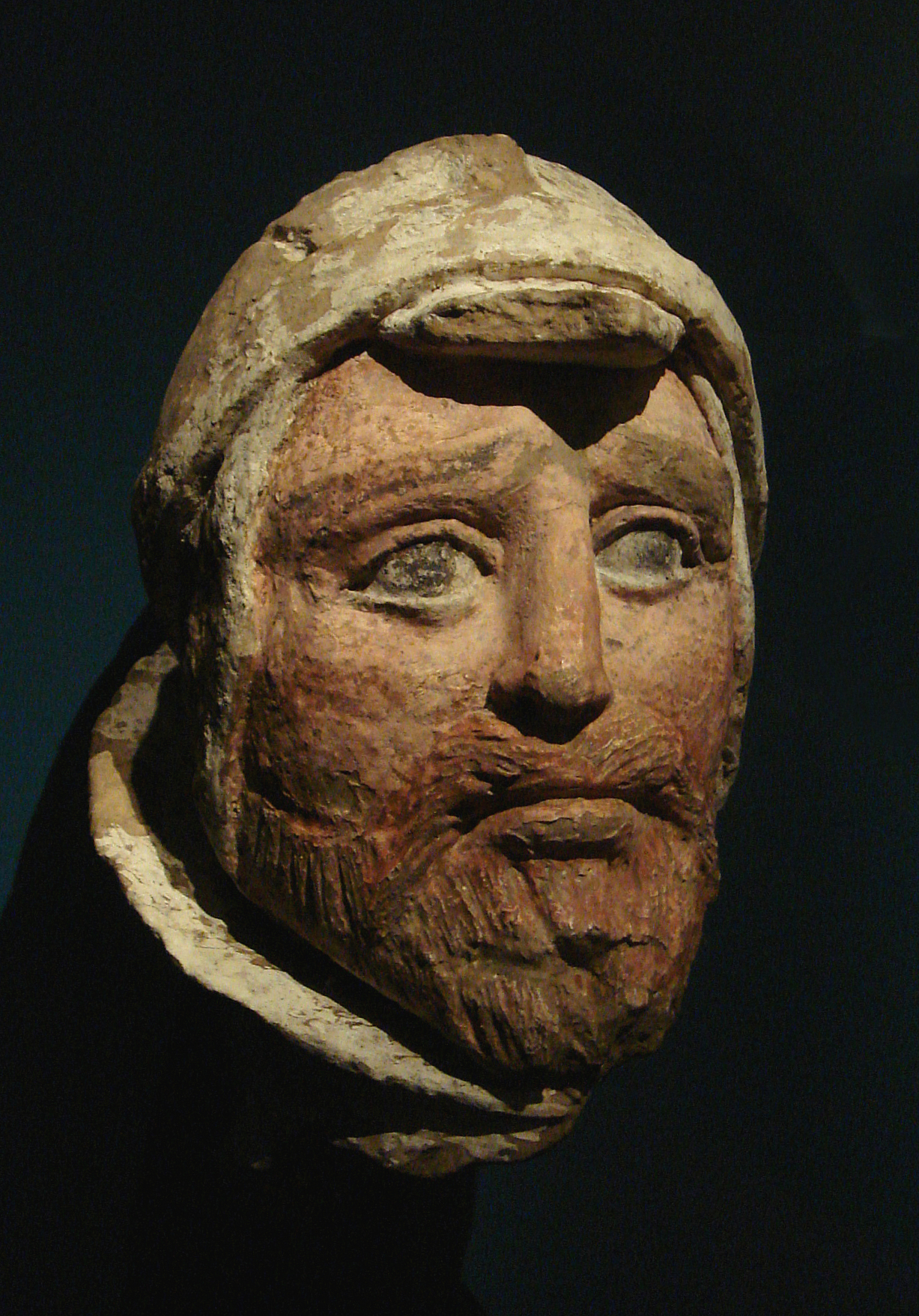
A Saka warrior, as a defeated enemy of the Yuezhi, Khalchayan. 1st century BCE

Location of Khalchayan in Central Asia.
Khalchayan (South Asia)
Khalchayan (Uzbekistan)
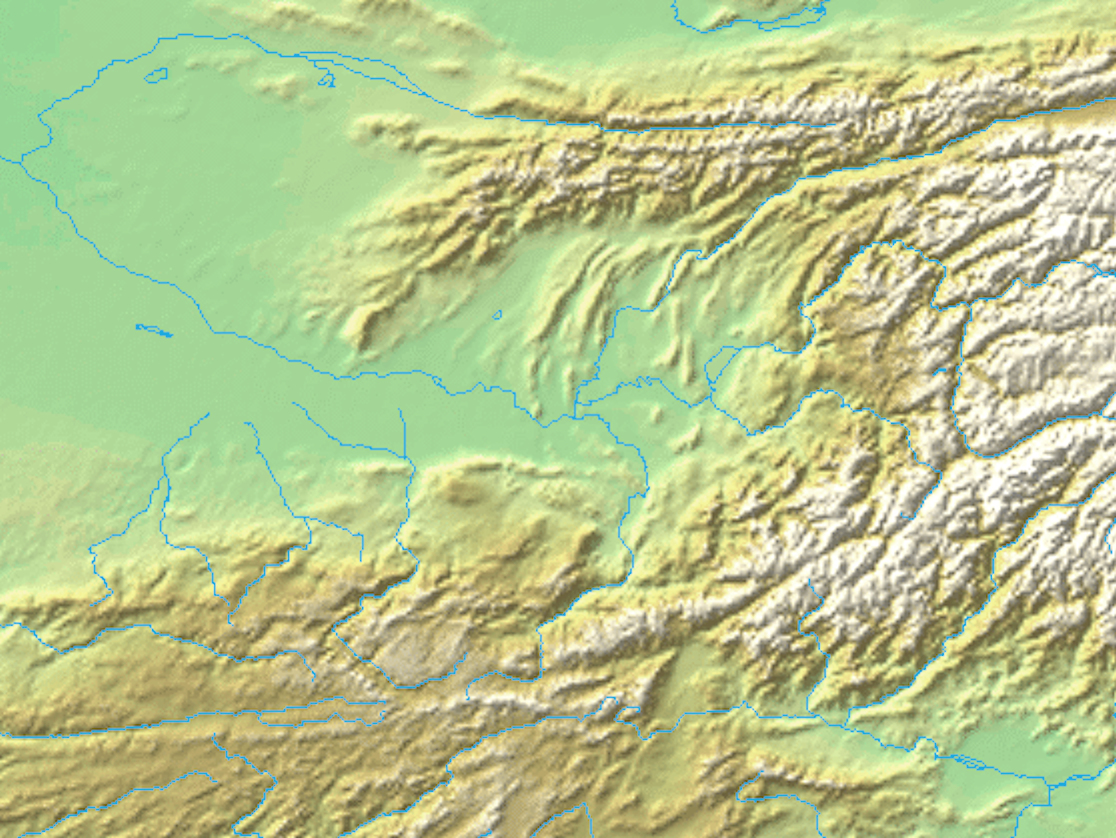
Khalchayan (Bactria)

Khalchayan (also Khaltchaïan) is an archaeological site, thought to be a small palace or a reception hall, located near the modern town of Denov in Surxondaryo Region of southern Uzbekistan. It is located in the valley of the Surkhan Darya, a northern tributary of the Oxus (modern Amu Darya).

== Terracotta statues ==
The site is usually attributed to the early Kushans, or their ancestors the Yuezhi/Tocharians. It was excavated by Galina Pugachenkova between 1959 and 1963. The interior walls are decorated with clay sculptures and paintings dated to the mid-1st century BCE, but they are thought to represent events as early as the 2nd century BCE. Various panels depict scenes of Kushan life: battles, feasts, portraits of rulers.

Some of the Khalchayan sculptural scenes are thought to depict the Kushans fighting against a Saka tribe. The Yuezhis are shown with a majestic demeanour, whereas the Sakas are typically represented with side-whiskers, and in more or less grotesque attitudes.

=== Portrait of a Parthian king ===
The bust of a Parthian king was discovered among the sculptures at Khalchayan, and the time period and resemblance from numismatics suggest that this may represent Vardanes I as he sought refuge, and possibly an alliance, in Bactria at the Yuezhi court. Tacitus related that Vardanes "took refuge among the Bactrians", after his failure at the siege of Seleucia circa 35 CE. These events might give a terminus post quem of around 45-47 CE for the Khalchayan portrait of the Parthian king, a period when the contemporary Kushan ruler may have been Kujula Kadphises.

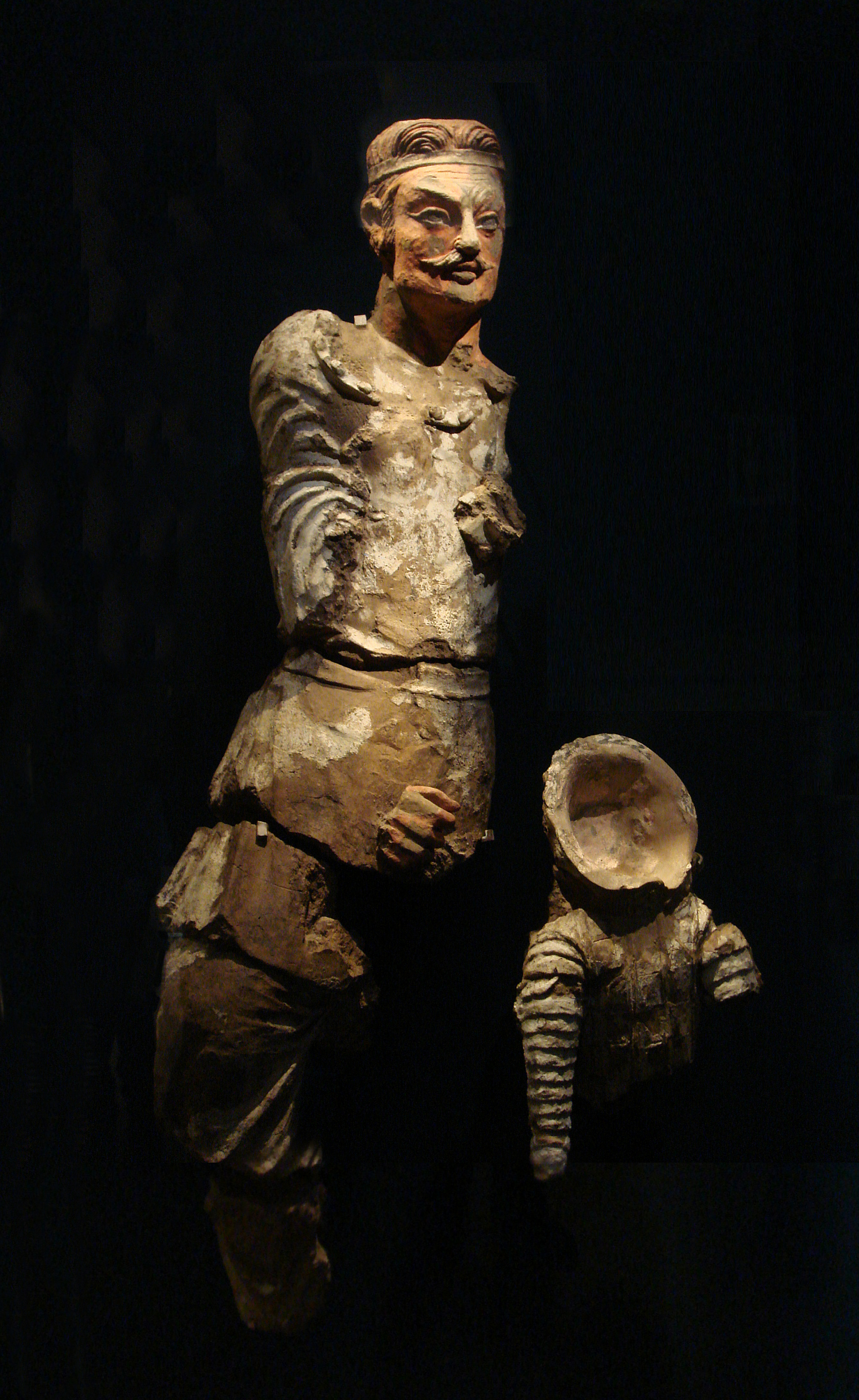
Yuezhi Prince from Khalchayan. At his feet, the trophy of a Saka cataphract armour with neck-guard. 1st century BCE. Museum of Arts of Uzbekistan, nb 40.

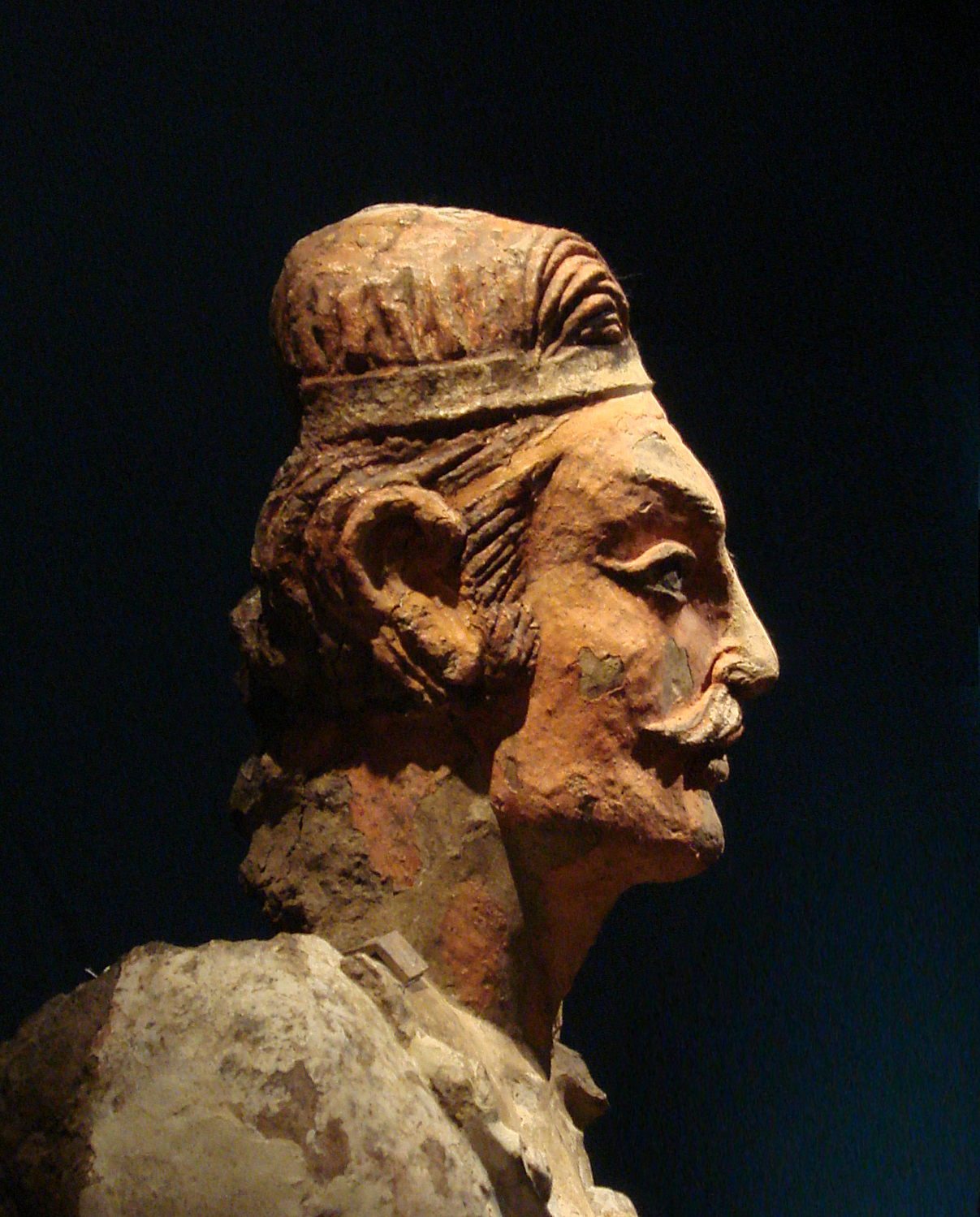
The Prince displays artificial cranial deformation.

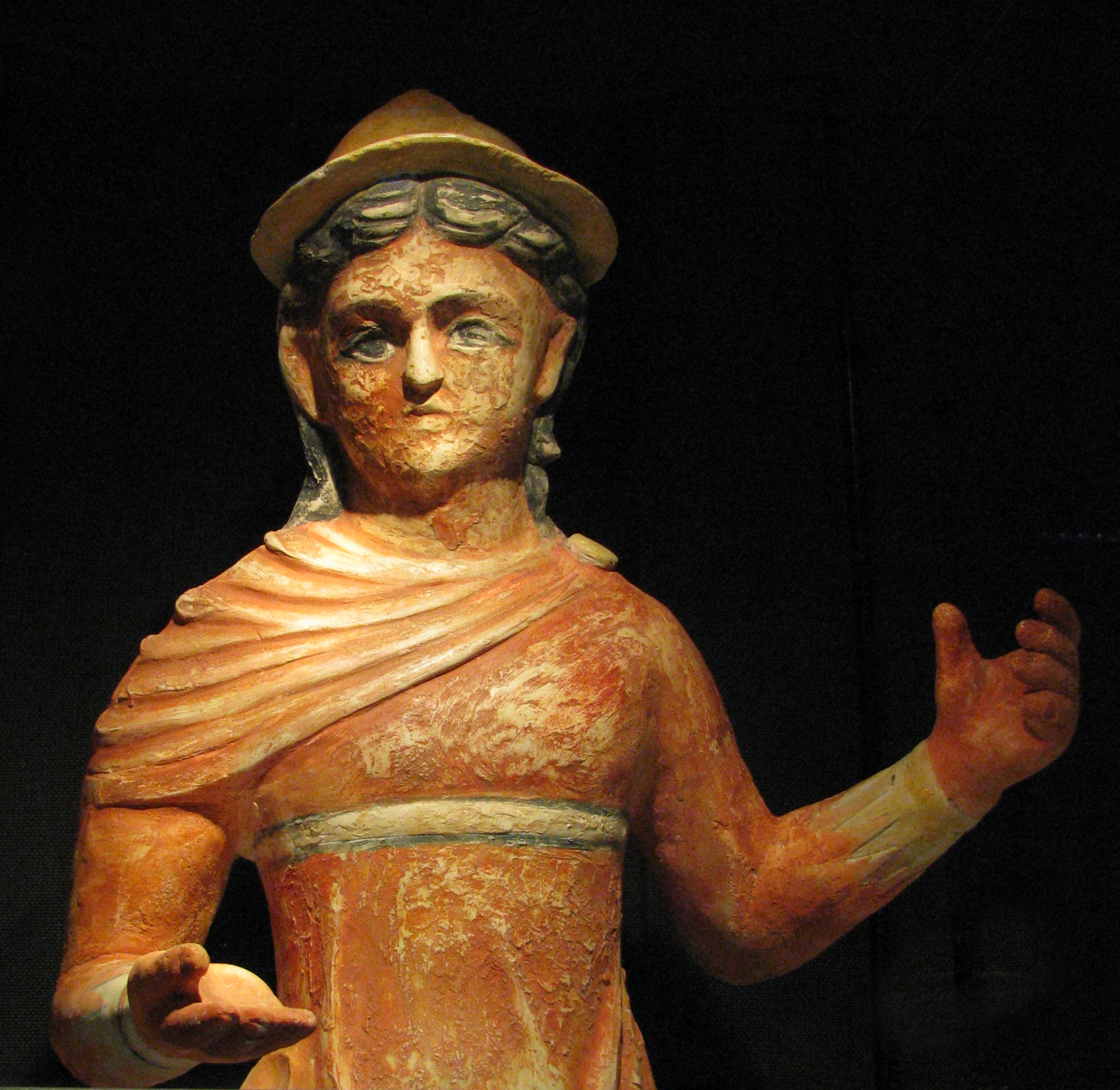
Another terracotta statue from Khalchayan, 1st century BCE-1st century CE. Termez Archaeological Museum.

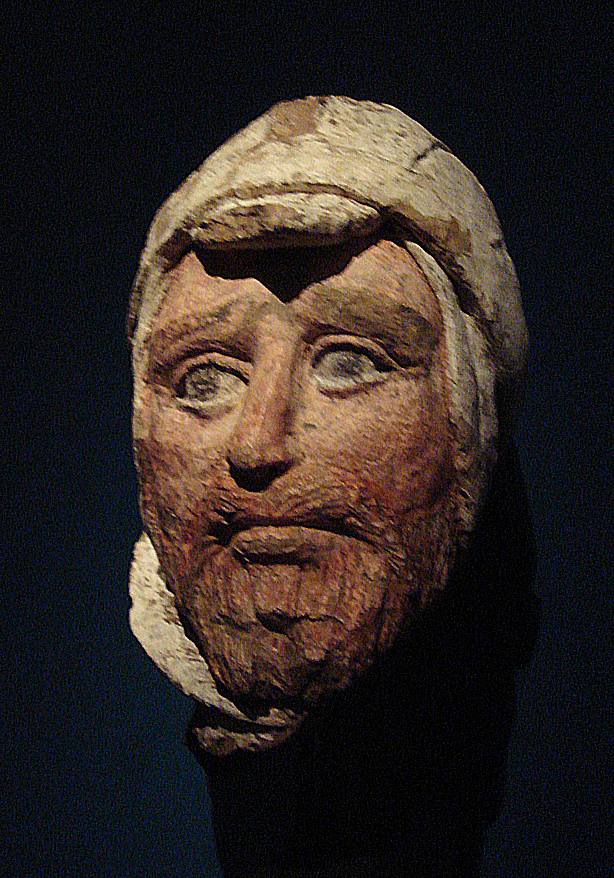
Saka soldier, Kalchayan

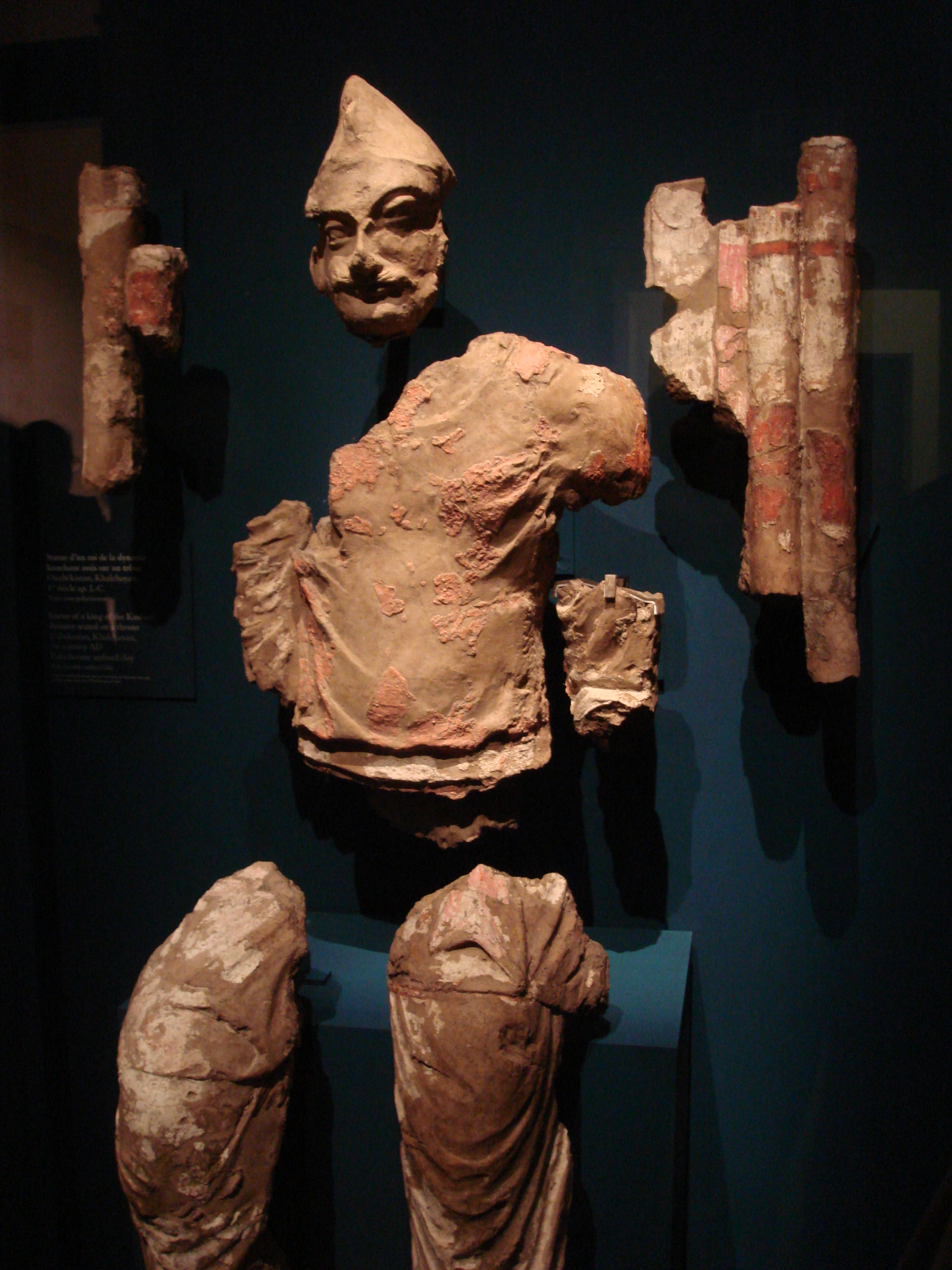
Kalchayan, King on a throne

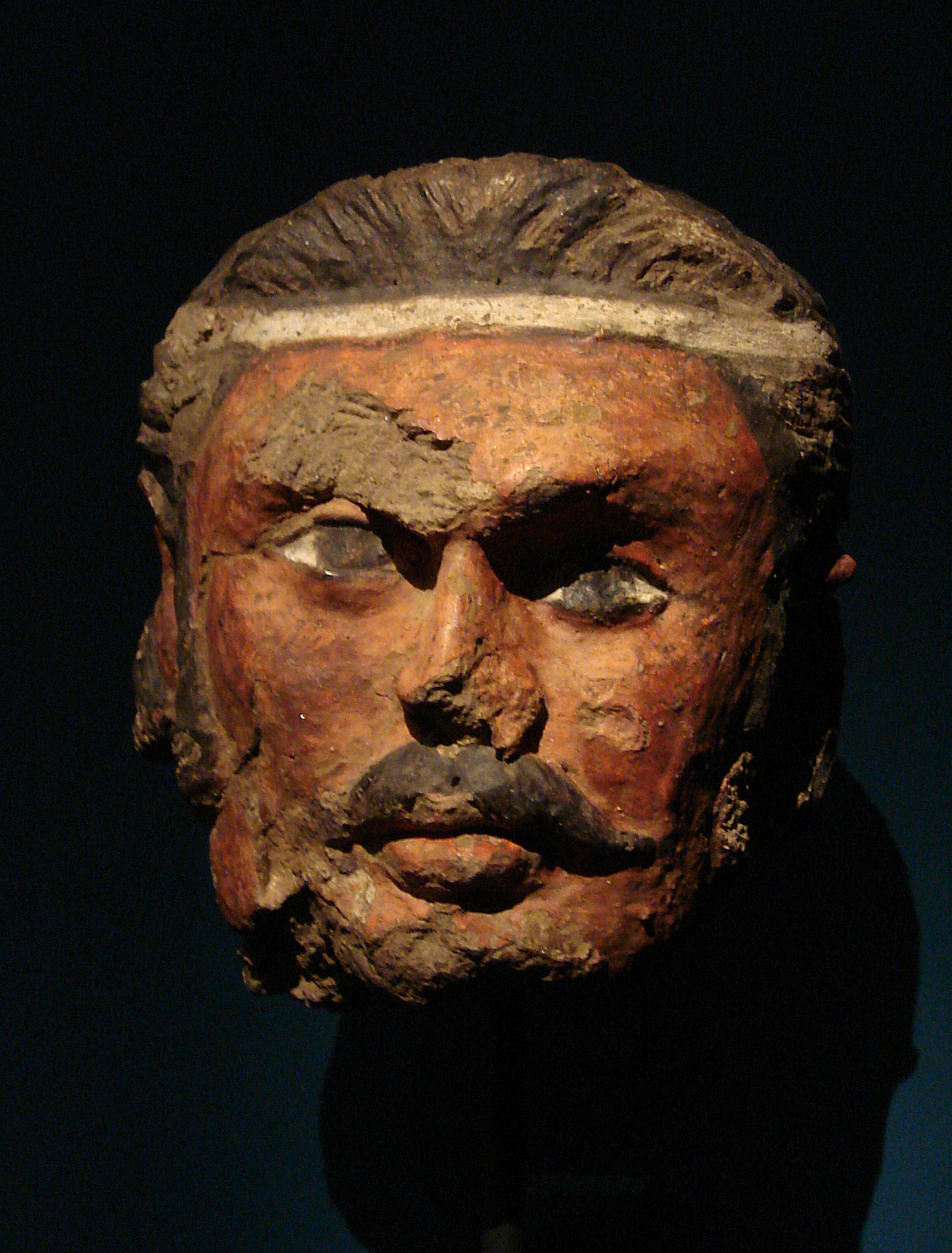
Kalchayan portrait. Museum of Arts of Uzbekistan

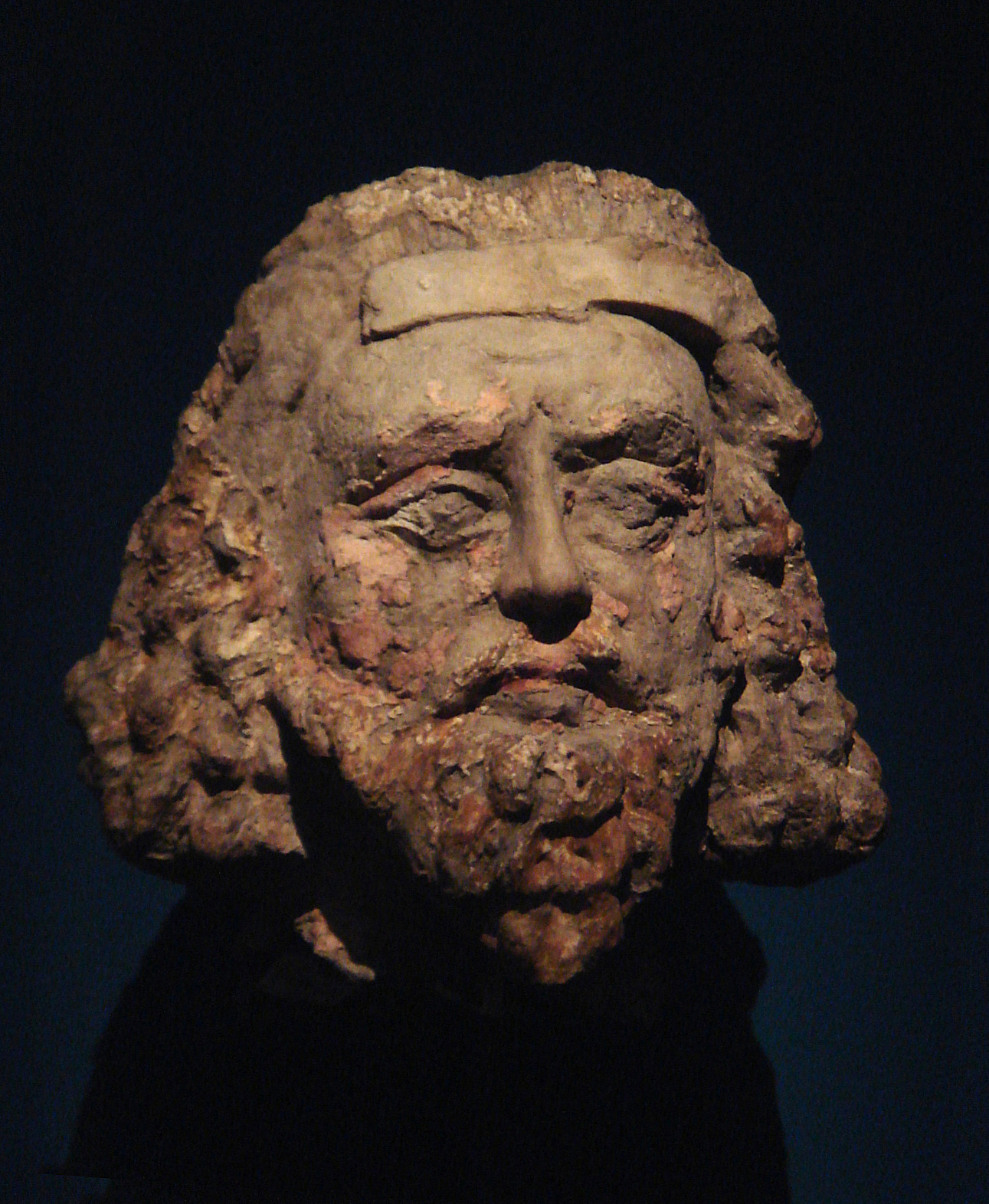
Portrait of a Parthian king, possibly Vardanes I.

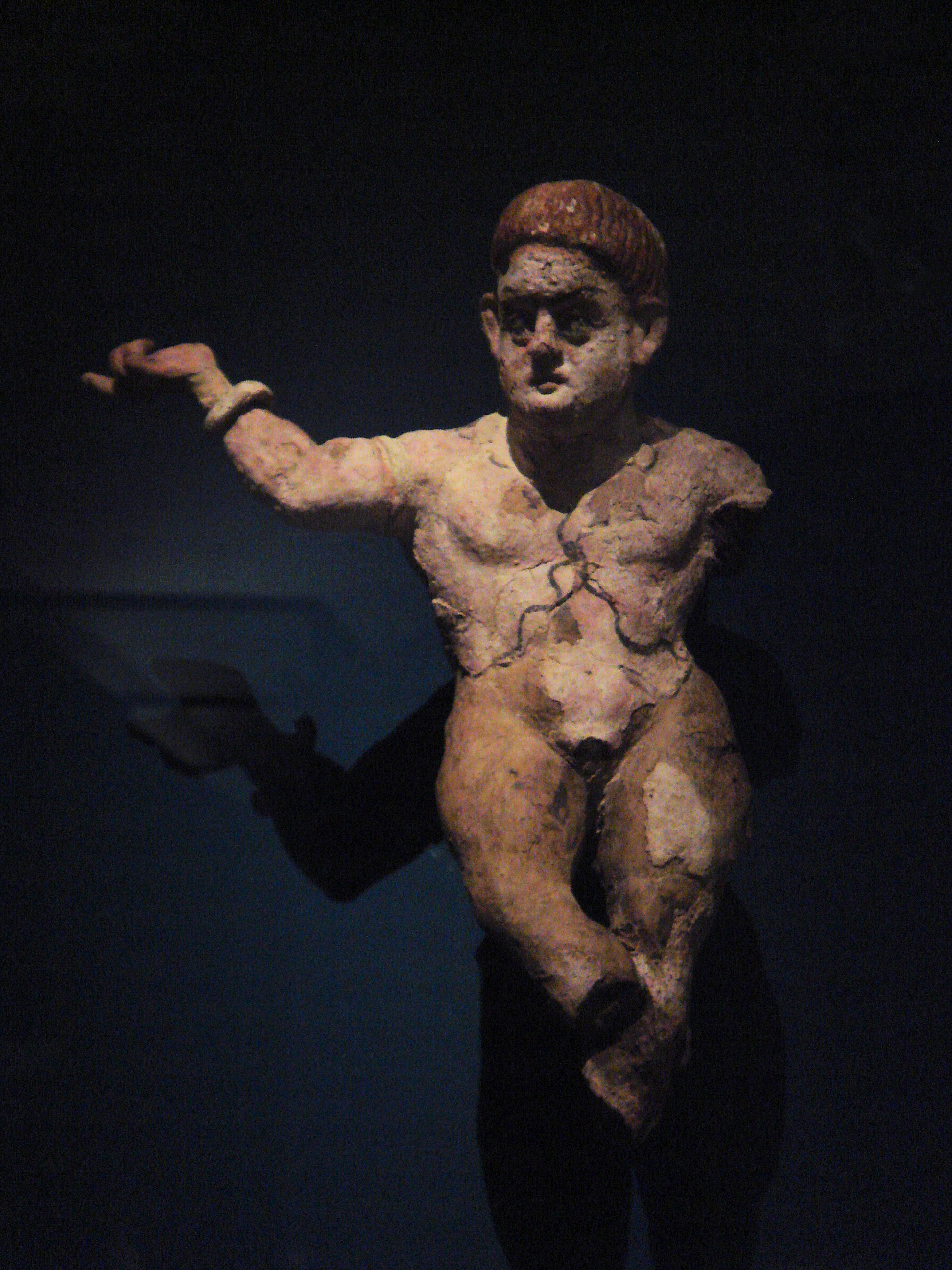
Khalchayan cherub.

== Influences ==
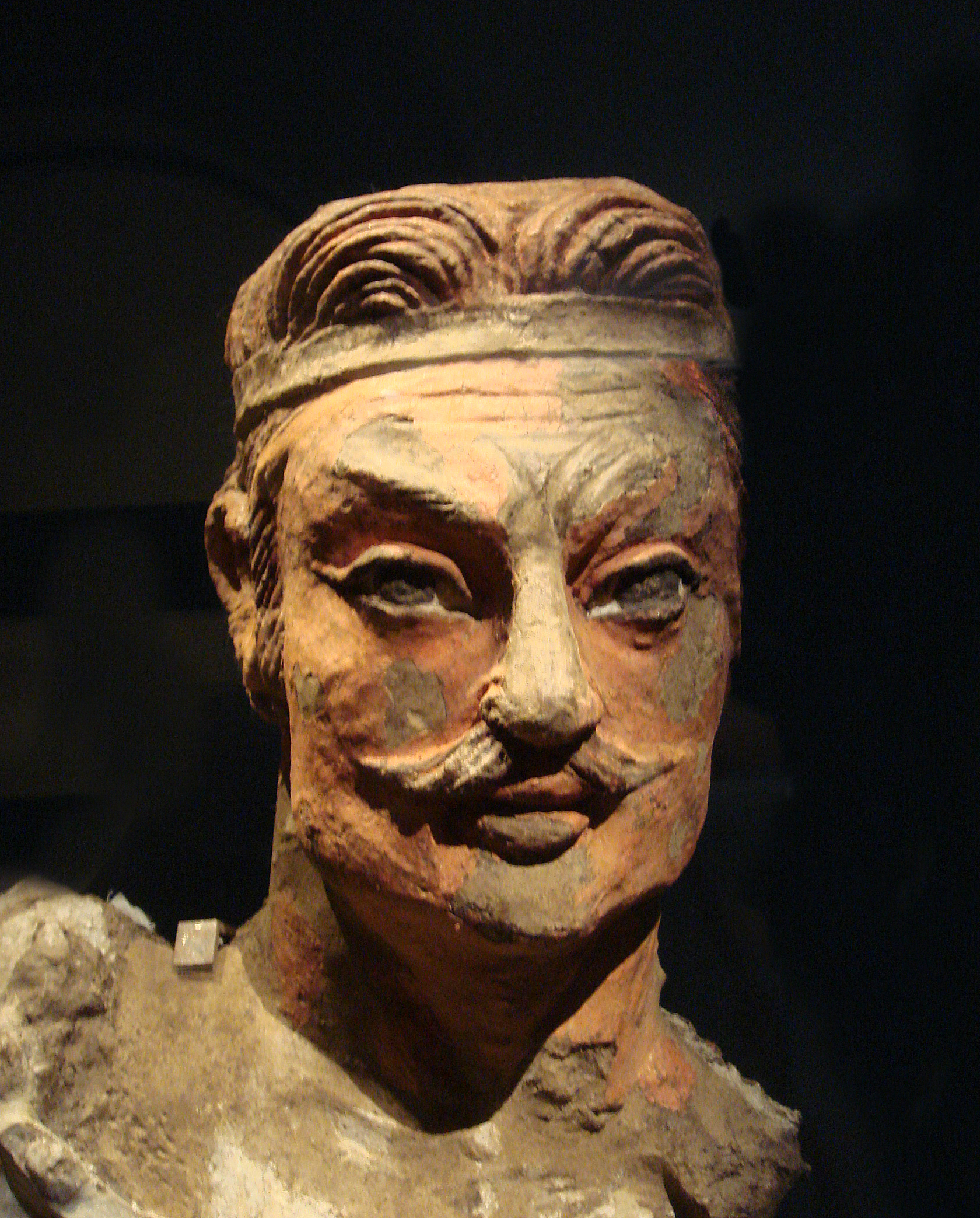
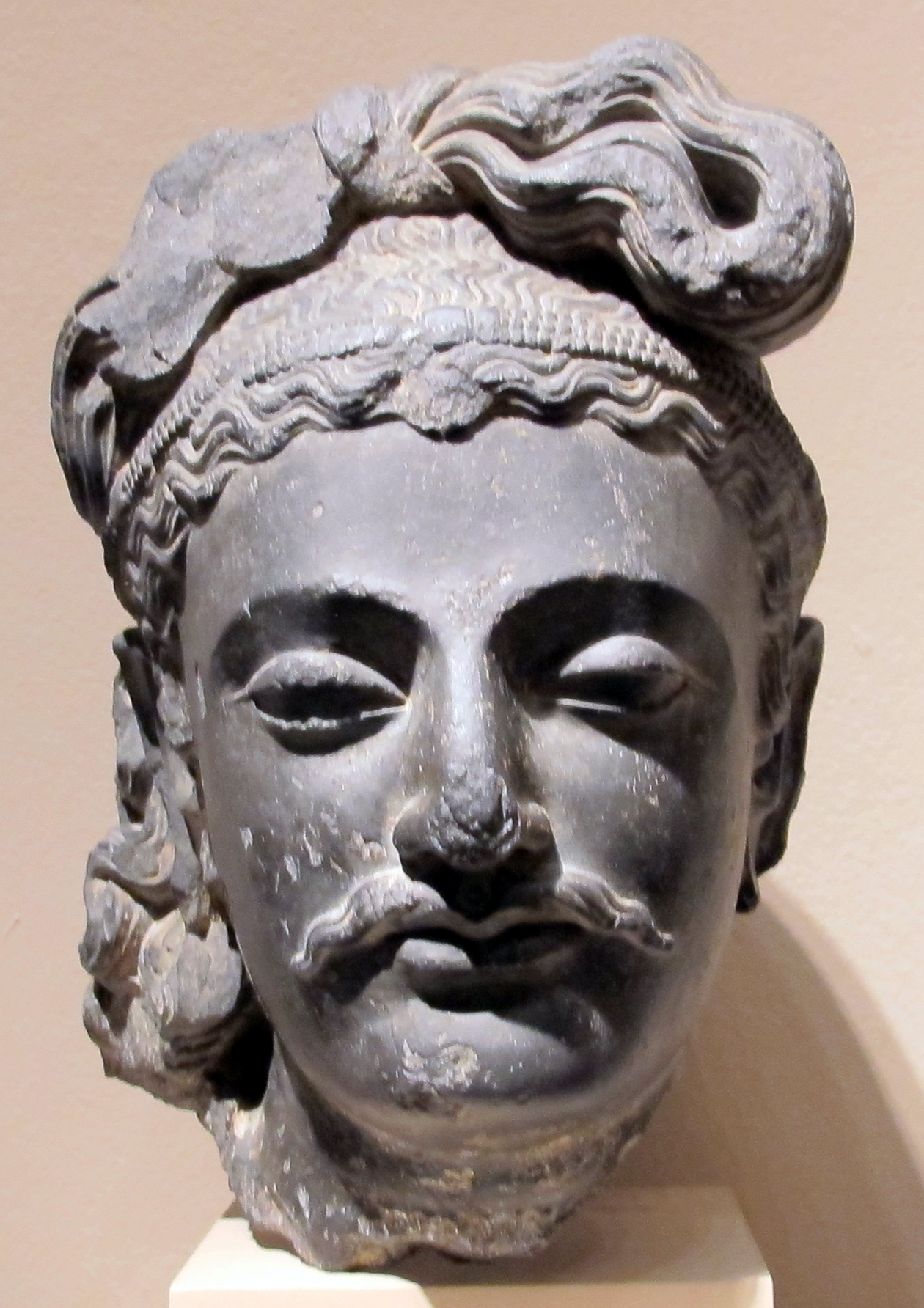
Portrait of a Kushan prince from Khalchayan (left), and head of a Gandhara Bodhisattava (right), said to have similar characteristics (Philadelphia Museum of Art).

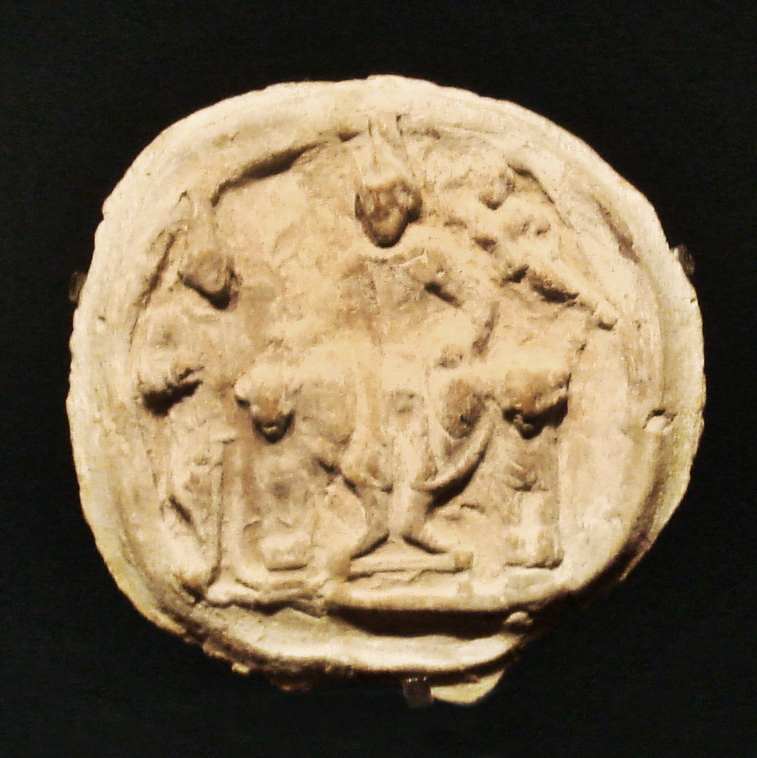
Medallion with Kushan king on a throne, Kalchayan, 1st century CE

According to Benjamin Rowland, the art of Kalchayan of the end of the 2nd century BCE is ultimately derived from Hellenistic art, and possibly from the art of the cities of Ai-Khanoum and Nysa, but it also has similarities with the later Art of Gandhara and may even have been at the origin of its development.

Rowland particularly draws attention to the similarity of the ethnic types represented at Khalchayan and in the art of Gandhara, and also in the style of portraiture itself. For example, Rowland find a great proximity between the famous head of a Yuezhi prince from Khalchayan, and the head of Gandharan Bodhisattvas, giving the example of the Gandharan head of a Bodhisattva in the Philadelphia Museum of Art. The similarity of the Gandhara Bodhisattva with the portrait of the Kushan ruler Heraios is also striking. According to Rowland the Bactrian art of Khalchayan thus survived for several centuries through its influence in the art of Gandhara, thanks to the patronage of the Kushans.

According to Chinese researcher Duan Qingbo, the style and construction techniques of the Khalchayan statues closely resembles those of the earlier Terracotta Army, which may suggest some form of artistic influence.

== Sources ==
- "Les Saces", Iaroslav Lebedynsky
