= Galina Pugachenkova =

Soviet archeologist and art historian (1915–2007)

- A portrait photograph of Pugachenkova
- Born: 7 February 1915; Verniy, Russian Empire
- Died: 18 February 2007 (aged 92); Tashkent, Uzbekistan
- Citizenship: Soviet Union → Uzbekistan
- Education: Central Asian Industrial Institute
- Scientific career
- Notable students: Edvard Rtveladze

Galina Anatolyevna Pugachenkova (Russian: Галина Анатольевна Пугаченкова; 7 February 1915 – 18 February 2007) was a Soviet archaeologist and art historian, regarded as a founder of Uzbek archaeology and central to the progression of archaeology and art history under the Soviet regime. Her work has contributed greatly to the register of surviving buildings in Central Asia and in many cases was the first register of traditional surviving buildings. Pugachenkova directed a branch of the archaeological expedition of southern Turkmenistan from 1946 to 1961, and of the Uzbek historical-artistic expedition from 1959 to 1984.

== Education and career ==
Pugachenkova published over 700 works in six languages, on the fine and applied art of antique and medieval central Asia. Her career began in 1937 when she graduated from the Central Asian Industrial Institute. This led to a long career studying the development of ancient Asia, including monuments such as exploring places such as Holchayon, Dalvarzintepa and Bactria.

Pugachenkova began writing her first scientific works in 1958, characterised by her interest in the evolution of Central Asian architecture in the history of architecture, with a particular focus on 14th and 15th century. The study of the architectural material collected during the excavation campaigns of Khalchayan and Dalverzintepa allowed her to develop theories on the genetic origins of Kushan art and the various influences of Bactrian and Parthian culture on the artistic culture of Gandhara.

She developed a great interest in numismatics, which allowed her to refine her study of the different ancestral sculptural styles and her lively interest in the coroplastics of Margiana and Northern Bactria, led her to study the bas-reliefs of Samarkand as a relative material for details and small architectural patterns.

G.A. Pugachenkova has left a number of monographs on the concept of the evolution of Central Asian art, including "The Art of Uzbekistan from the Most Ancient Times to the middle of the 19th Century", awarded by the Khamza Uzbek SSR State Prize. (co-author with L.I. Rempel), "The Art of Turkmenistan", "The Art of Afghanistan", "The Art of Bactria of the Kushan era", "From the artistic treasure of the Middle East".

Pugachenkova held the following positions over the course of her career:

- Associate Professor of Archaeology Department of History Faculty, Central Asian University (Tashkent State University) (1942–60), then Professor (1962)
- Head of the Department of History of Art and Architecture (1960–84)
- Head of Scientific Expedition and Head of Art History of Uzbekistan (1959–84)
- Academy of Sciences of Uzbekistan Academician-Secretary of the Department of History, Linguistics and Literary Studies (1984–87)
- Academic Advisor at the Institute of History of the Academy of Sciences of Uzbekistan (1987)

She was critical of the dispersal of Uzbek treasures into foreign museums and called in the 1970s for their repatriation. This has begun with extensive publications of catalogues to draw the material together.

Galina Pugachenkova was married to Mikhail Masson, who was also a well-known central Asian archaeologist. After her death, mourners were able to see her a final time in her coffin in the Central Exhibition Hall of the Uzbek Academy of Arts. She was buried on 19 February 2007, following Christian rites.

== Art history ==
As an art historian she wrote on a wide variety of central Asian art-forms, including miniature painting. On miniature painting, she said that when artists illustrated literature in the form, they showed "their time and their place" not that of the literary work. Pugachenkova came up with original interpretations of art historical questions, including a study of the dragon totem seen on the Sheikh Jemaliddin Mosque in Turkmenistan. She also studied illuminated manuscripts in Uzbekistan.

== Archaeology ==
Pugachenkova had her first contact with the world of archaeology thanks to her participation in the YuTAKE (Southern Turkmen Archaeological Complex Expedition) project from 1936 to 1938, led by Mikhail Masson, who later became her husband. The project, which for the first time brought a systematic approach to archaeology in Central Asia, developed in Pugachenkova the awareness that the architectural artifacts kept in museums are not sufficient to reconstruct the development of Middle Eastern architecture and art, but it is essential to seek history in the artifacts preserved in situ and under the ground. The experience at YuTAKE, the following years spent in Uzbekistan, Turkmenistan, Tajikistan, Kyrgyzstan, Afghanistan and Iran, and the collaboration with Masson, resulted in Pugachenkova applying archaeological methods in the research and study of architectural monuments leading to the creation of unique expeditions to explore the historical-artistic heritage of Uzbekistan. Her work has opened the doors of the Central Asian and Afghan art to the world's scientific community and to the entire world.

As an archaeologist, Pugachenkova excavated widely and published both on art and architecture, including Buddhist architecture in the fourth-century. She also worked extensively on Sogdian archaeology with Vladimir Karasev. She studied the archaeology of the Silk Road through Turkmenistan as part of a team from the Academy of Science. She was the first person to study in detail the eleventh century ruins of Akcha-kala. Another research project led her to research the fifteenth century Timurid gardens, proposing they followed established plans and held many symbolic meanings in their layout. Materials, such as gold were central to her research, as she studied the wealth from a wide variety of sites. She also had a keen research interest in burial practices from Sogdia.

=== Field research ===
- Early 1980s: Pugachenkova led the Uzbek Art-Historical Expedition to carry out excavations at the burial-ground of Orlat, 50 km north-west of Samarkand.
- 1974–6: she led the excavation of the site Jiga Tepe, which dated from the Hellenistic to the Sassanian eras.
- 1973: she led excavations in Afghanistan exploring the Kushan military camp at Zadian.
- 1972: she led the excavations at Dalverzin Tepe, uncovering extraordinary elephant figurines from India.
- 1967–9: she led the surveys of Islamic monuments around Herat, this led to extensive excavation.
- 1960: architectural investigation of the mausoleum at Arab Ata.
- 1959–63: she led the excavations at Khalchayan.
- 1947: excavation and recording of the Seyit Jamal-ad-Din Mosque. The mosque was destroyed by an earthquake the following year and Pugachenkova's photographs are the only record today.

== Honours and awards ==
- Medal "For Valorous Labor in the Great Patriotic War of 1941-1945" (1946)
- Honoured Art Worker of Uzbekistan (1964)
- State Hamza Prize for his scientific research "History of the Arts of Uzbekistan from ancient times to the XIX century" (together with Lazar Rempel) (1966)
- Medal "For Valorous Labor. In commemoration of the 100th anniversary of the birth of V. I. Lenin" (1970)
- Order of the Red Banner of Labour (1975)
- Academician of the Academy of Sciences of Uzbekistan (1984)
- Laureate of the Biruni State Prize of Uzbekistan (1992)
- Was elected Academician of the Academy of Arts of Uzbekistan (1993)
- Order "Doʻstlik" (1995)
- Palme d'Or, Académie française (1995)
- Gold medal of the Academy of Arts of Uzbekistan (2000)
- Order of Outstanding Merit (23 August 2002)

G. A. Pugachenkova was elected corresponding member of the German Archaeological Institute, Italian Institute of Middle and Far East, honorary doctor of Strasbourg University, honorary academician of the International Academy of Oriental Architecture, many other authoritative scientific institutions.

== Selected publications ==
- Pugachenkova, G. A. The Antiquities of Transoxiana in the Light of Investigations in Uzbekistan (1985-1990) (Brill, 1990)
- Pugachenkova, G. A. The Sculpture of Khalchayan. Moscow, 1970.
- Pugachenkova, G. A. Khalchayan. Tashkent
- Pugachenkova, G A, 1979. Iskusstvo Baktrii epokhi Kushan. Moskva: Izdatel’stvo Iskusstvo.
- Pugachenkova, G A and Usmanova, Z I, 1995. Buddhist monuments in Merv. In In the land of the Gryphons. Papers on Central Asian archaeology in antiquity, ed. A. Invernizzi, 51–81. Firenze: Casa Editrice Le Lettere.
- Pugachenkova, G. A. (1961), 'Bronzovoe zerkalo iz Termeza [A bronze mirror from Tirmidh]', SE, 1.
- Pugachenkova, G. A. (1963), 'K istorii antichnoi stroitel'noi tekhniki Baktrii-Tokharistana [Contribution to the History of Ancient Construction Technology in Bactria-Tokharistan]', SA, 4, 73–85.
- Pugachenkova, G. A. (1963), 'K istoricheskoi topografii Chaganiana [Contribution to the Historical Topography of Chaganian]', Trudy TashGU [Works of Tashkent State University], 200.
- Pugachenkova, G. A. (1965), 'Ob odnoi gruppe terrakotovykh satuetok Tokharistana [On one group of terracotta figurines from Tokharistan]', Novoe v Sovetskoi Arkheologii [New Developments in Soviet Archaeology] (Moscow).
- Pugachenkova, G. A. (1967), 'Dve stupa na iuge Uzbekistana [Two Stupas in the South of Uzbekistan]', SA, 3, 257–64.
- Pugachenkova, G. A. (1967), 'K stratigrafii novykh monetnykh nakhodok v Severnoi Baktrii [Contribution to the Stratification of New Coin Finds from Northern Bactria]', VDI, 3.
- Pugachenkova, G. A. (1971), 'Novoe v izuchenii Dal'verzin-Tepe (K istorii baktriisko-kushanskoi gorodskoi kul'tury) [New developments in the investigation of Dal'verzin-Tepe (Contribution to the history of Bactrian-Kushan urban culture)]', SA, 4, 186–203.
- Pugachenkova, G. A. (1971), Skul'ptura Khalchaiana [The Sculpture of Khalchaian] (Moscow).
- Pugachenkova, G. A. (1971), 'Novoe v izuchenii Dal'verzin-Tepe (K istorii baktriisko-kushanskoi gorodskoi kul'tury) [New developments in the investigation of Dal'verzin-Tepe (Contribution to the history of Bactrian-Kushan urban culture)]', SA, 4, 186–203.
- Pugachenkova, G. A., Rtveladze, E. V. (1971), 'Novye monetnye nakhodki iz pravoberezhnoi Baktrii [New coin finds from right-bank Bactria]', VDI, 4.
- Pugachenkova, G. A. (1973), 'K arkhitekturnoi tipologii v zodchestve Baktrii i vostochnoi Parfii [Contribution to the Architectural Typology of Bactria and Eastern Parthia]', VDI, 1.
- Pugachenkova, G. A. (1973), 'Novye dannye o khudozhestvennoi kul'ture Baktrii [New data on the artistic culture of Bactria]', Iz istorii antichnoi kul'tury Uzbekistana [From the History of the Antique Culture of Uzbekistan] (Tashkent).
- Pugachenkova, G. A. (1976), 'K otkrytiiu nadpisei kkharoshtkhi na zolotykh predmetakh Dal'verzinskogo klada [On the Discovery of Kharoshti inscriptions on golden objects from Dalverzin Tepe]', VDI, 1.
- Pugachenkova, G. A. (1976), 'Baktriiskii zhiloi dom (k voprosu ob arkhitekturnoi tipologii) [The Bactrian House (A Contribution to the Question of Architectural Typology)]', Istoriia i kul'tura Srednei Azii [The History and Culture of Middle Asia] (Moscow).
- Pugachenkova, G. A., Rtveladze, E. V., et al. (ed.), (1978), Dal'verzin-tepe, Kushanskii gorod na iuge Uzbekistana [Dalverzin-Tepe: a Kushan town in south Uzbekistan] (Tashkent).
- Pugachenkova, G. A. (1979), Iskusstvo Baktrii epokhi Kushan [Bactrian art of the Kushan period] (Moscow).
- Pugachenkova, G. A. (1981), 'Unikal'naia gruppa monet chaganianskogo chekana VI v. [A unique group of coins from sixth-century Chaganian]', Kul'tura i isuksstvo drevnego Khorezma [The culture and art of ancient Khwarezm] (Moscow).
- Pugachenkova, G. A., Rtveladze, E. V. (1983), 'Ob obrashchenii greko-baktriiskikh monet v Severnoi Baktrii [On the circulation of Greco-Bactrian coins in northern Bactria]', ONU, 5.
- Pugachenkova, G. A. (1984), 'Pozdneantichnaia zhivopis' Baktrii-Tokharistana. Tendentsii i stil' [Late antique paintings of Bactria-Tokharistan – Tendencies and style]', Iz istorii zhivopisi Srednei Azii, traditsii i novatorstvo[From the history of the paintings of Middle Asia: traditions and innovations] (Tashkent).
- Pugachenkova, G. A., Rempel', L. I. (1986), 'O zolote "bezymiannykh tsarei" iz Tillia-tepe (k probleme stilia i sviazei) [On the gold of 'unknown kings' from Tilya Tepe (Problems of style and connections)]', Iz istorii kul'turnykh sviazei narodov Srednei Azii i Indii [From the history of the cultural connections of the peoples of Middle Asia and India] (Tashkent).
- Pugachenkova, G. A. (1987), 'Shor-tepe', IMKU, 21.
- Pugachenkova, G. A., Rtveladze, E. V. (1990), Severnaia Baktriia-Tokharistan. Ocherki istorii i kul'tury. Drevnost' i srednevkov'e [North Bactria-Toharistan. Outlines of its history and culture. Antiquity and the Middle Ages.] (Tashkent).
