= Tardu (given name) =

- Gender: Male

Origin
- Language: Turkish
- Meaning: "a Light Coming from Darkness"

Tardu is a common masculine Turkish given name. In Turkish, "Tardu" means "a Light Coming from Darkness".

== Real People ==
- Tardu, the second yabgu and the first khagan of the Western Turkic Khaganate.
- Tardush Shad, first yabgu of Tokhara Yabghus.
- Tardu Flordun, a Turkish actor appearing in Binbir Gece (see also Turkish Wikipedia article).
