= Kohistan =

Kohistan (Persian: کوهستان, Tajik: кӯҳистон, lit. 'mountainous land'), also transliterated Kuhistan, Kuhiston, Quhistan, may refer to:

== In Afghanistan ==
- Kohistan District, Kapisa, Kapisa Province
  - Kohistan Hesa Awal District, a district in Kapisa Province, created within the former Kohistan District
  - Kohistan Hesa Duwum District, a district in Kapisa Province, created within the former Kohistan District
- Kohistan District, Badakhshan, a district in Badakhshan Province
- Kohistan District, Faryab, a district in Faryab Province

== In Pakistan ==
- Kohistan, Pakistan, mountainous region in Pakistan
- Kohistan (Sindh), a region in Sindh
- Kohistan District, Pakistan, a former district in Khyber Pakhtunkhwa province which presently forms the following three districts:
  - Upper Kohistan District
  - Lower Kohistan District
  - Kolai-Palas Kohistan District
- Swat Kohistan, tehsil in Swat District
- Dir Kohistan, a tehsil in Upper Dir

== In Tajikistan ==
- Kohistan-Badakshan, the Tajik name of Gorno-Badakshan

== In Iran ==
- Quhistan, a region of medieval Persia, the southern part of Greater Khorasan
- Qohestan, a city in Darmian County, South Khorasan province

== See also ==
- Kohistan District (disambiguation)
- Kohistani (disambiguation)
- Mehdi Nawaz Jung
