= Kohistan District =

Kohistan District may refer to one of the following:

== In Afghanistan ==
- Kohistan District, Badakhshan
- Kohistan District, Faryab
- Kohistan District, Kapisa
  - Kohistan Hesa Awal District, a district in Kapisa Province, created within the former Kohistan District
  - Kohistan Hesa Duwum District, a district in Kapisa Province, created within the former Kohistan District

== In India ==
- Kohistan district, a district of the former Indian princely state of Patiala

== In Pakistan ==
- Kohistan District, Pakistan, which was bifurcated into three districts; Upper Kohistan District, Lower Kohistan District and Kolai-Palas District in the Hazara Division of Northern Pakistan

== See also ==
- Kohistan (disambiguation)
