= Tokhara Yabghus =

625–758 CE dynasty of Turkic sub-kings

- 625 CE–758 CE
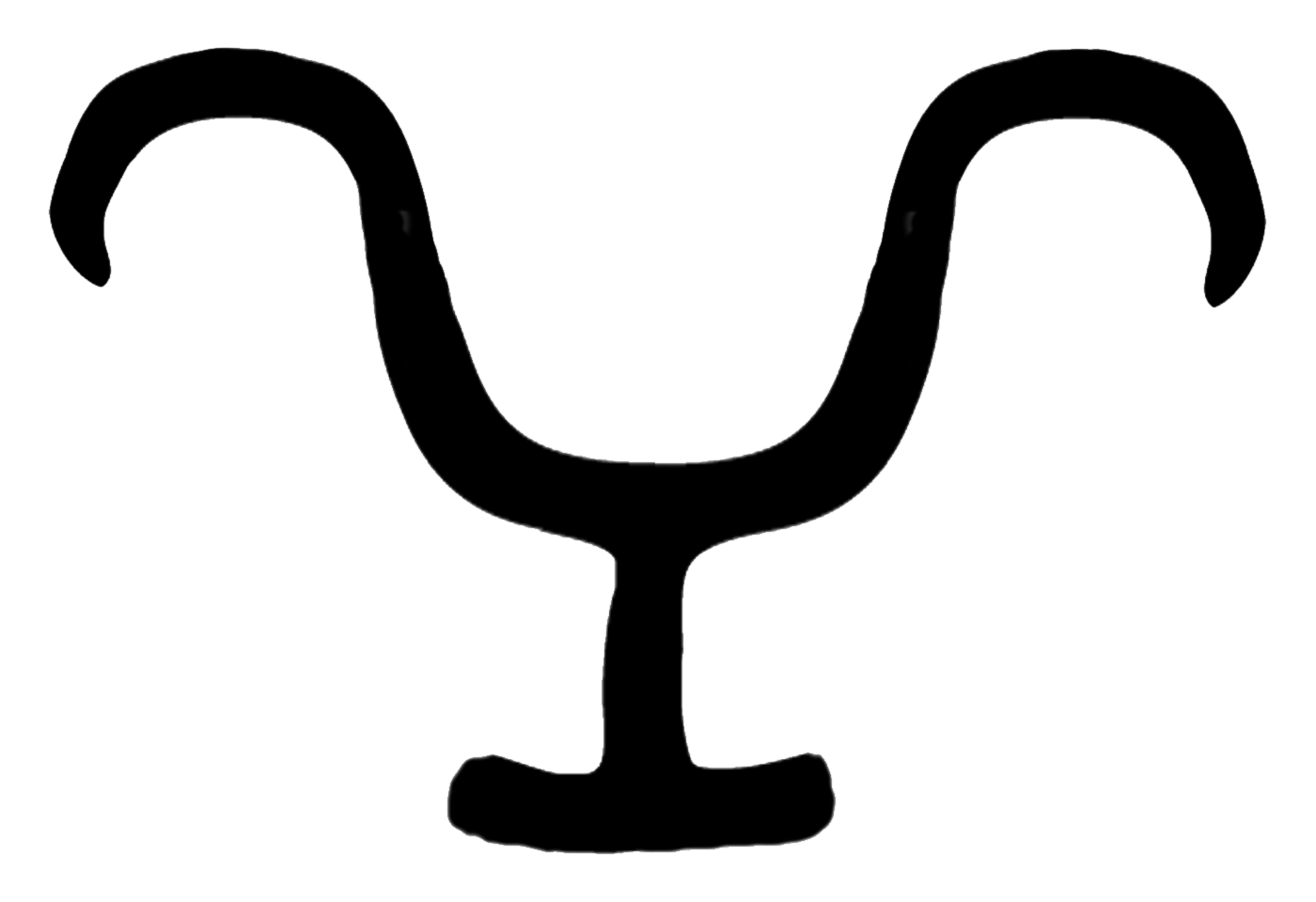
- Tamga

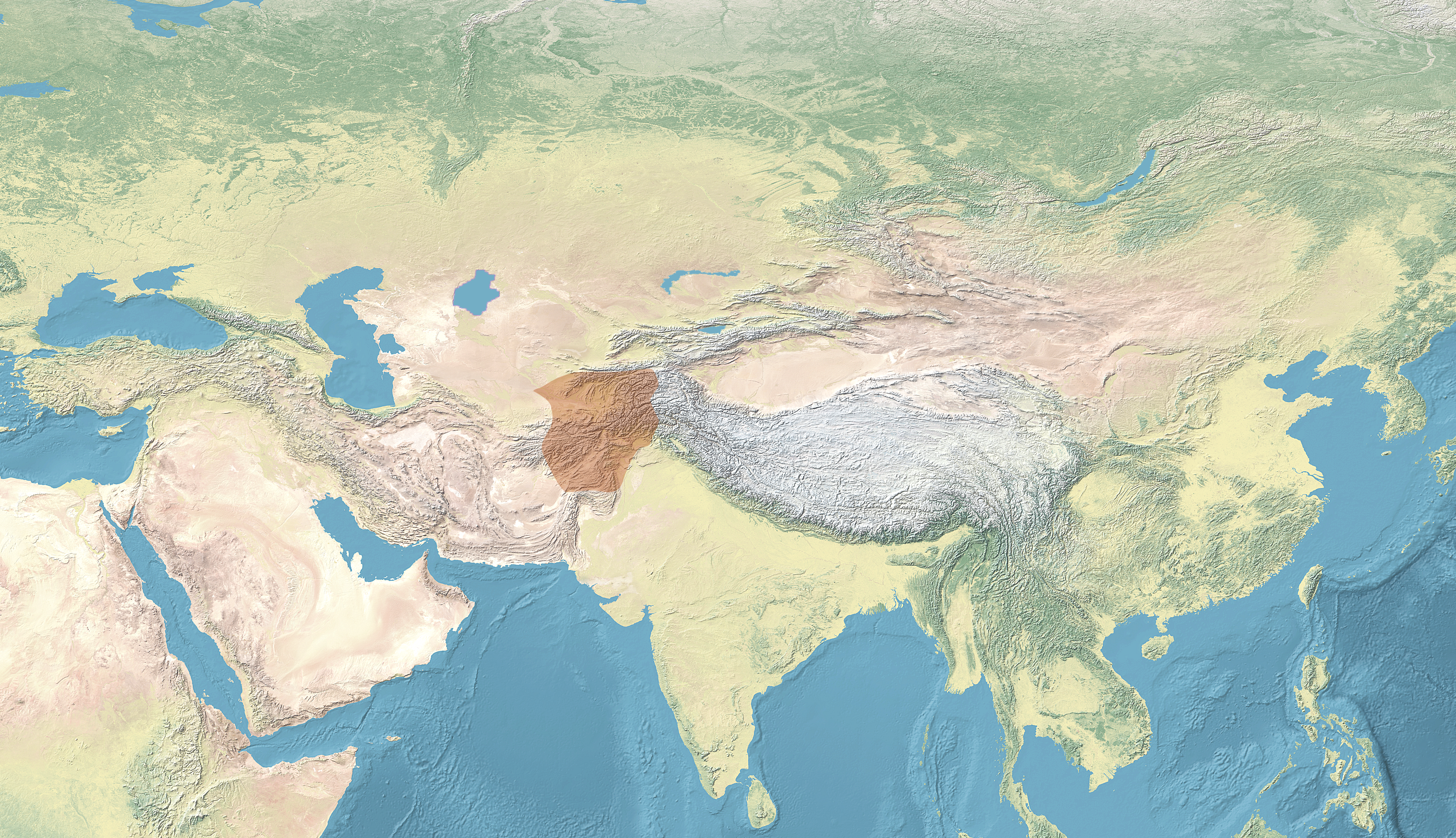
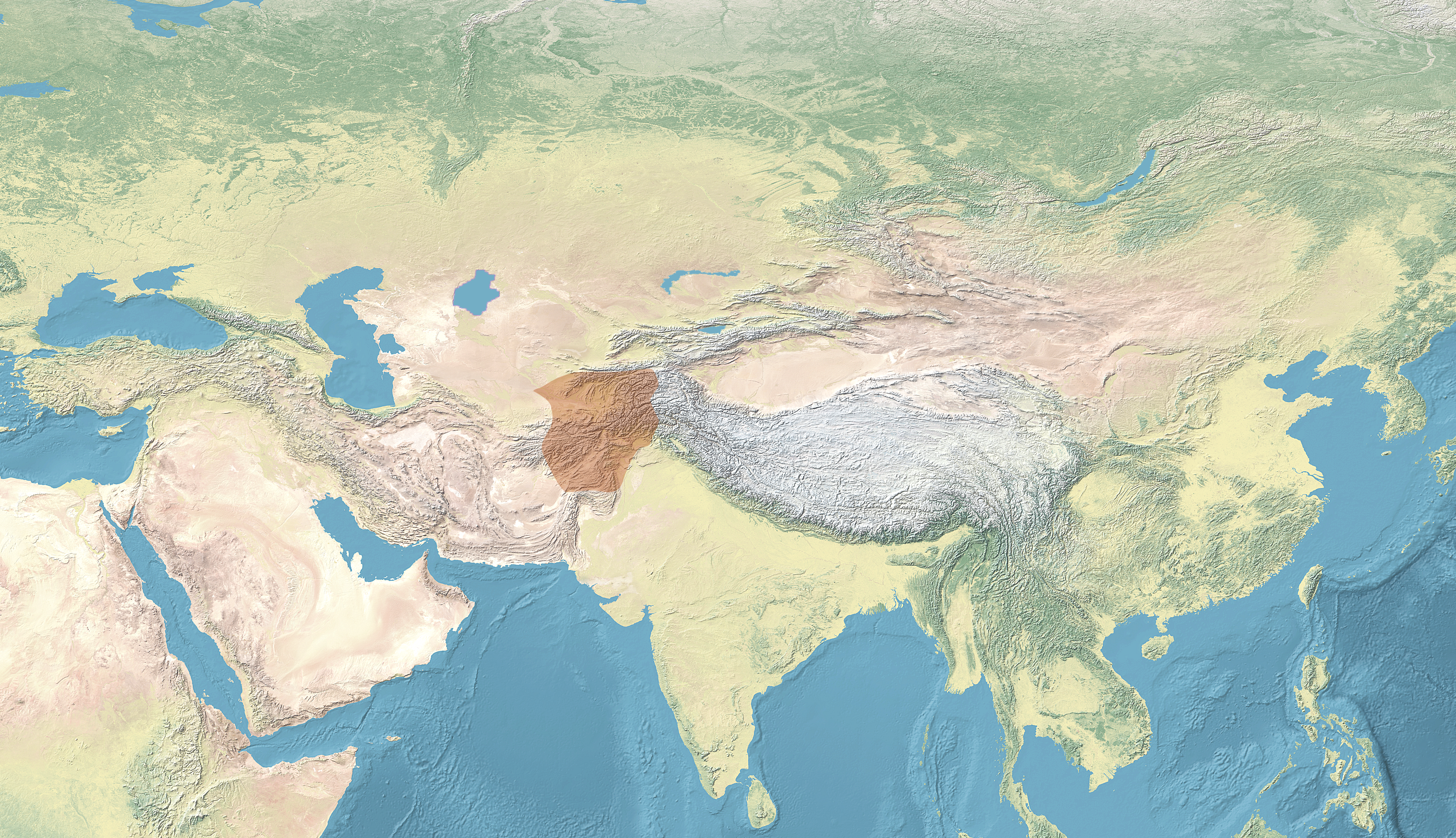
- Maximum extent of the territory controlled by the Yabghus of Tokharistan circa 625–652 CE

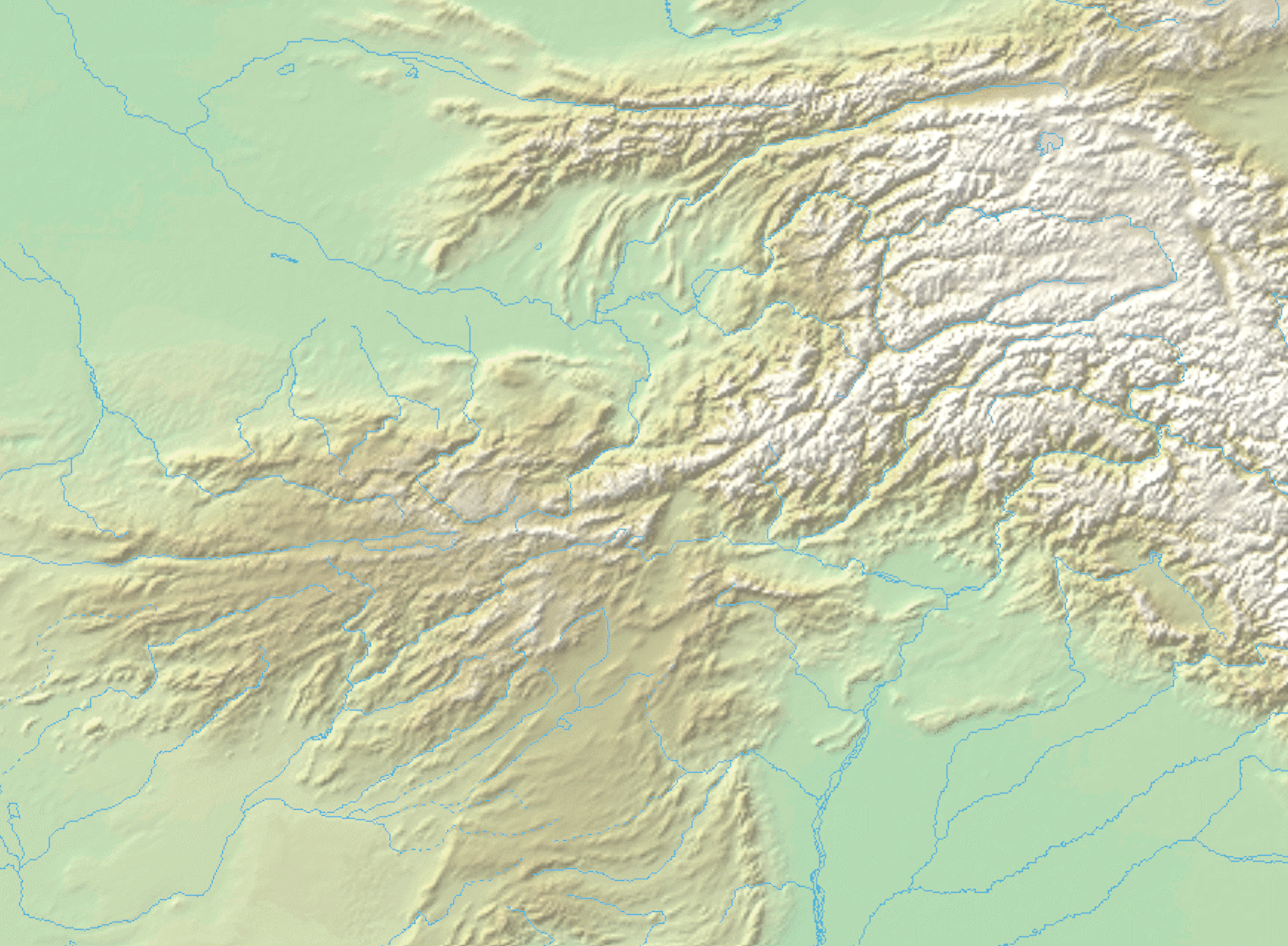
- Kunduz, the capital, and other important cities of the Yabghus of Tokharistan as of 718 CE, after the secession of the Turk Shahis and Zunbils. Herat, Khusp and Shuburgan had mints for Yabghu coinage.
- Capital: Kunduz
- Religion: Buddhism
- Government: Monarchy
  - c. 625 CE: Tardush Shad
- Historical era: Early Medieval
  - Established: 625 CE
  - Disestablished: 758 CE
Preceded by	Succeeded by
Sasanian Empire; Hephthalite principalities	Tang dynasty; Turk Shahis
- Today part of: Afghanistan; Pakistan; Uzbekistan; Tajikistan

The Tokhara Yabghus or Yabghus of Tokharistan (simplified Chinese: 吐火罗叶护; traditional Chinese: 吐火羅葉護; pinyin: Tǔhuǒluó Yèhù) were a dynasty of Western Turk rulers with the title "Yabghu"; who ruled from 625 CE in the area of Tokharistan north and south of the Oxus River, with some smaller remnants surviving in the area of Badakhshan until 758 CE. Their legacy extended to the southeast where it came into contact with the Turk Shahis and the Zunbils until the 9th century CE.

== Territorial expansion ==
The Turks initially occupied the area of north of the Oxus (Transoxonia, Sogdiana) following their destruction of the Hephthalites in 557–565 CE through an alliance with the Sasanian Empire. The Sasanians, on the other hand, took control of the area south of the Oxus, with Chaganiyan, Sind, Bust, Rukhkhaj, Zabulistan, Tokharistan, Turistan and Balistan being transformed into vassal kingdoms and principalities. After this time, a tense Turco-Persian border existed along the Oxus, which lasted several decades. The area south of the Oxus contained numerous Hephthalites principalities, remnants of the great Hephthalite Empire destroyed by the alliance of the Turks and the Sasanians.

=== First offensive into Tokharistan (569–570 CE) ===
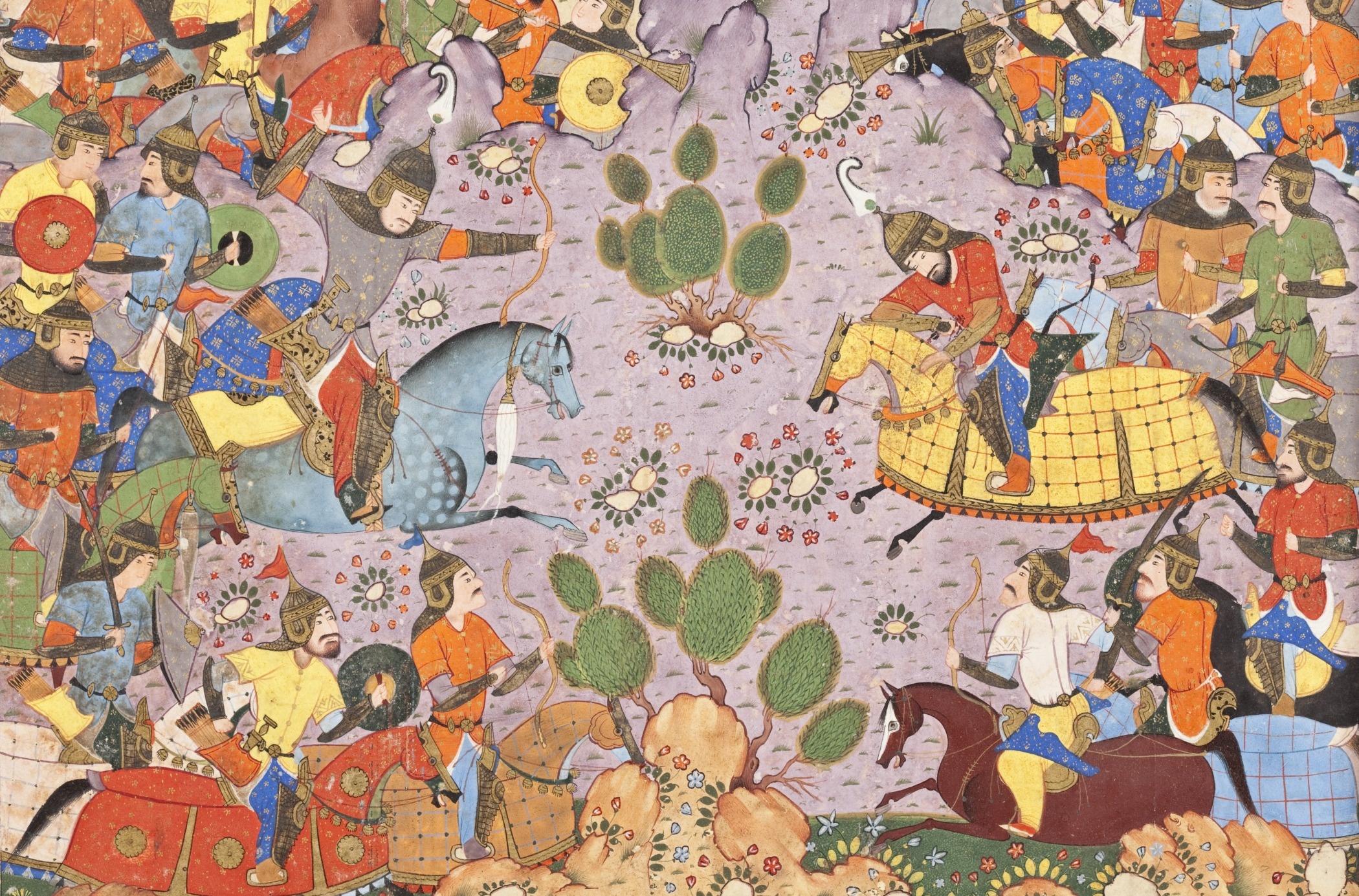
Bahram Chobin fighting the Turk Yabghu Bagha Qaghan in 588–589 CE. c. 1560 manuscript, Shiraz, Iran.

In 569–570, the Turks launched an offensive against the Sasanian Empire, and conquered the Hephthalite principalities south of the Oxus belonging to the Sasanian Empire. At that time the Sasanian Empire was embroiled in a war in the west, with the Byzantine Empire. It seems the Turks reached the Kabul–Gandhara area in 570. The principalities of the Hephthalites, formerly vassals of the Sasanian Empire, accepted Turk supremacy and became vassals of the Western Turk qaghan, and the Alchon Huns continued to rule in Kabul and Gandhara, but the Turks apparently did not permanently occupy the territory south of the Oxus. The Hephthalites aspired to independence from the Turks, and in 581 or 582 CE, they revolted in alliance with the Sasanians against the Turk Kaghan Tardu.

=== Second offensive into Tokharistan (588–589 CE) ===
In 588–589, the Turks under Bagha Qaghan entered into a direct conflict with the Sasanians, in the First Perso-Turkic War. The Turks invaded the Sasanian territories south of the Oxus, where they attacked and routed the Sasanian soldiers stationed in Balkh, and then proceeded to conquer the city along with Talaqan, Badghis, and Herat. But the Turks were defeated by the Sasanians under Bahram Chobin, who entered the area north of the Oxus and killed the Turkish Khagan.

=== War against the Sassanian Empire (616–617 CE) ===
A war broke out between the Sassanians and the Hephthalites in 606–607 or 616–617 CE, the Second Perso-Turkic War. At that time, the Turkic Khagan sent an army to help the Hephthalites, and was able to bring a great defeat upon the Sasanians, advancing his troops as far as Ray and Isfahan, but Shikui Khagan recalled his armies without pressing his advantage.

== Occupation of Tokharistan under Tong Yabghu Qaghan (625 CE) ==
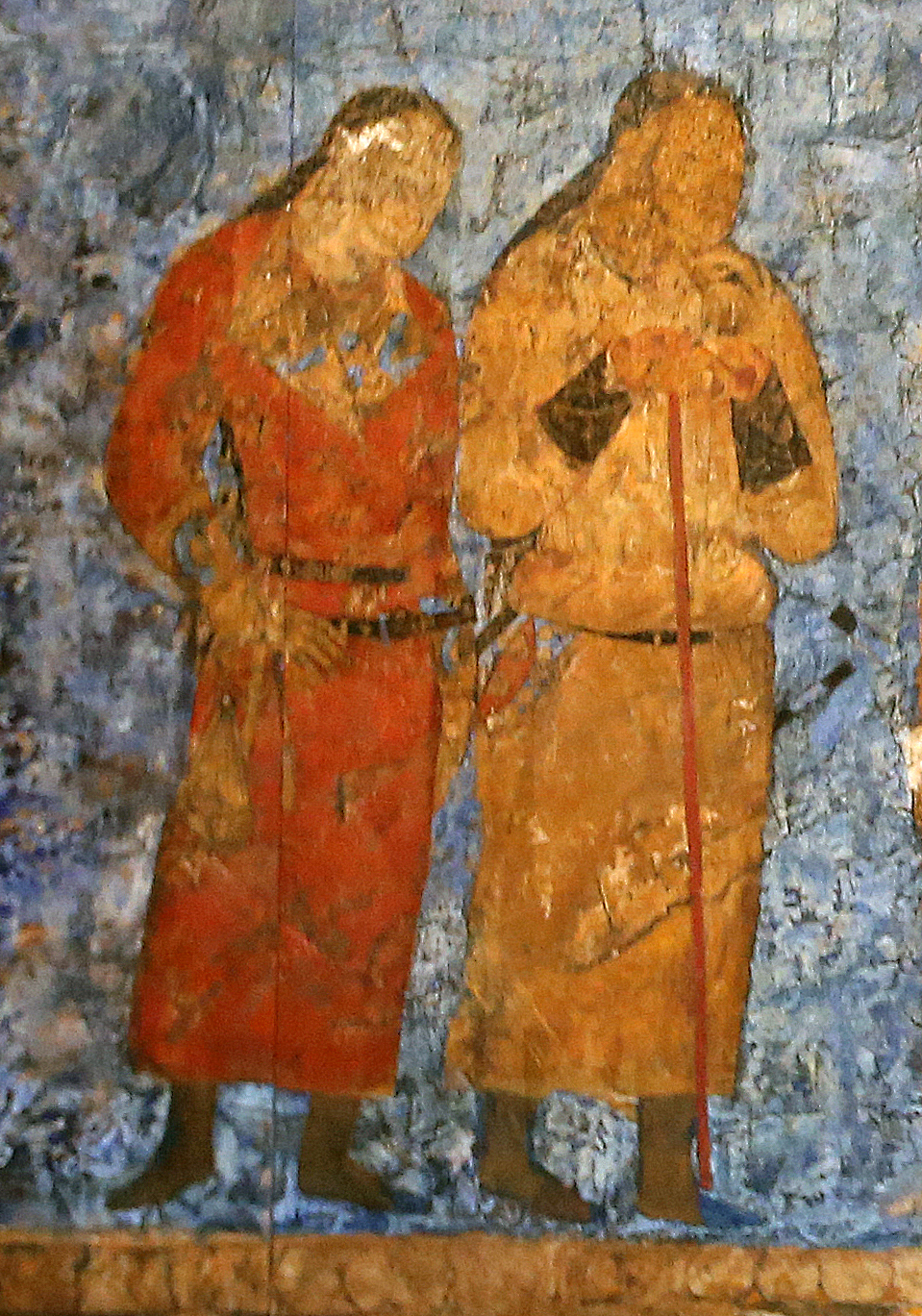
Western Turk officers during an audience with king Varkhuman of Samarkand. 648–651 CE, Afrasiyab murals. They are recognizable by their long plaits.

The Turks definitely intended to take control of the territories south of the Oxus, but were only ready sometime later, and took the opportunity when the Sasanian Empire again entered into conflict with the Byzantine Empire.

In 625, Tong Yabgu invaded Tokharistan and forced the Hephthalite principalities to submit. He went as far as the Indus River and took control of all the intervening principalities, replacing Hepthalite rulers by Turk ones. The Turks were victorious, partly because the Sasanian Empire was into a difficult war with the Byzantine Empire, the Byzantine–Sasanian War of 602–628.

According to Cefu Yuangui, these principalities were Zabulistan, Kapisa-Gandhara, Khuttal, Chaghaniyan, Shignan, Shuman, Badhgis, Wakhan, Guzgan, Bamiyan, Kobadiyan and Badakhshan. The areas of Khuttal and Kapisa-Gandhara had remained independent kingdoms under the easternmost "Hephthalites" (actually Alchon Hun) under kings such as Narendra, before being taken over as vassals by the Western Turks. The appearance of the "crown with a bull's head" on the coin portraits of the last rulers of Kapisa-Gandhara Narendra II, can be considered as a sign of recognition of Turk sovereignty, since the title buqa (bull) had been in use from 599, when Khagan Tardu united the Turk Empire.

Tong Yabghu Qaghan then installed his son Tardush Shad (Chinese: 達頭设; pinyin: Dátóu Shè), as the first yabgu (sub-king) of Tokharistan, controlling all the new Turk realm south of the Oxus, from his capital at Kunduz.

=== Reign of Tardush Shad (625–630) ===
Tardush Shad (Chinese: 達頭设; pinyin: Dátóu Shè) was installed in Tokharistan, and ruled in Kunduz with title of Tokharistan Yabgu (Chinese: 吐火羅葉護; pinyin: Tǔhuǒluó Yèhù). He was married two times – both a daughter of Qu Boya (麴伯雅) – ruler of Qocho. When Xuanzang visited Kunduz, he also brought a letter from his brother-in-law and ruler of Qocho Qu Wentai (麴文泰) to Tardu. Yabgu received him despite being in ill condition. It was Tardu to advise him to make a trip westward to Balkh (modern Afghanistan), to see the Buddhist sites and relics. Xuanzang also witnessed a palace scandal when Tardu's firstborn son Ishbara Tegin fallen in love with his new step-mother (also aunt) and poisoned Tardu in 630.

=== Reign of Ishbara Yabgu (630–650) ===
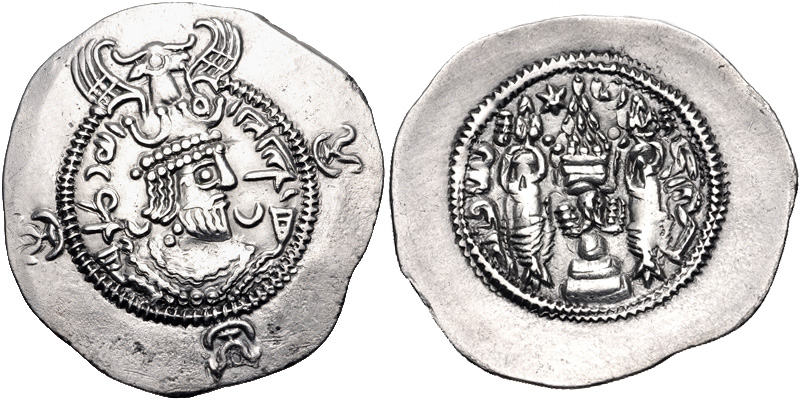
Coinage of a Yabghu of Tokharistan

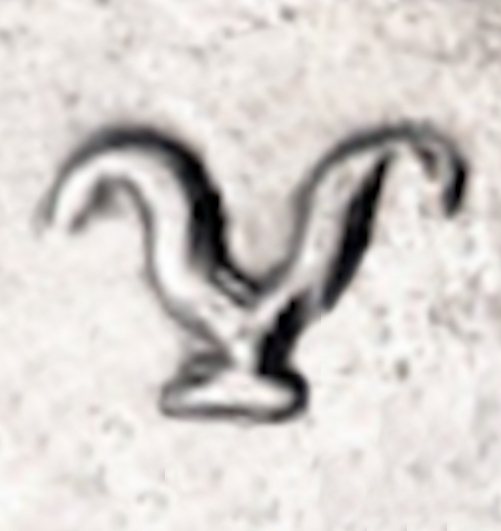
Tamgha

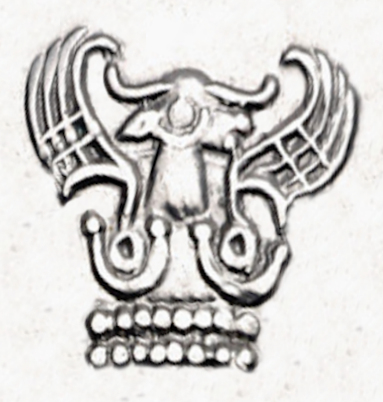
Crown

Obverse: Sasanian-style bust, wearing crown with two crescents, and Nezak-style head of a bull within wings. Tokhara Yabghus tamghas in crescents along the outer margins.
Reverse: Sasanian-style fire altar with ribbons and attendants; star and crescent flanking flames. Dated RY, "Year 15". Probably 645 CE

Ishbara Yabgu (Chinese: 阿史那沙钵罗; pinyin: Ashina Shaboluo) was the son of Tardu Shad, and took over as Tokharistan Yabgu. He was the first Tokharistan Yabghu to mint coins. In these coins, in Sasanian style, his effigy represents him bearing a crown decorated with the bull's head and two wings. In one of the issues, the legend is: šb’lk’ yyp MLK’ (Išbara Jeb ˇ [= yabghu] šah, on the obverse) and pnˇcdh. h. wsp’ ("[minted in his] 15th [regnal year at] Khusp", on the reverse). This would date the coin to 645 CE, with a location for the mint at Khusp, Kuhistan. Other known mints are Herat and Shuburgan.

After 650 however, the power of the Yabghus of Tokharistan fragmented, as they came, as least partially, under Tang suzerainty. A Türk yabghu of Tokharistan recorded under the name of "Wu-shih-po of the A-shih-na dynasty" was the first yabghu to be confirmed by the Chinese Emperor.

In 652–653 CE, the Arabs under Abdallah ibn Amir conquered the whole of Tokharistan and captured the city of Balkh, as part of the Muslim conquests of Afghanistan.

The Western Turkic Khaganate itself was destroyed by the Tang dynasty in 657 CE, and most of his territories became protectorates of the Tang Empire, and organized into regional commanderies. Kunduz became the site of the Yuezhi Commandery (月氏都督府, Yuèzhī Dūdùfû) under administration of the Anxi Protectorate.

During the rule of the Umayyad caliph Ali (656–661), the Arabs were expulsed from eastern Iran, as far as Nishapur and the Sasanian Peroz III was able to establish some level of control with the help of the yabghu of Tokharistan in Seistan.

=== Reign of Pantu Nili (c.705 CE) ===
In 705, P’an-tu-ni-li, the yabghu of Tokharistan, is recorded as having sent a mission to the Chinese court. He ruled from Badakshan, as the area of Balkh and the central areas of his territory were occupied by the Arabs, including Shuburgan, Khusp and Herat.

==== Suzerainty over the territories north and south of the Hindu-Kush ====
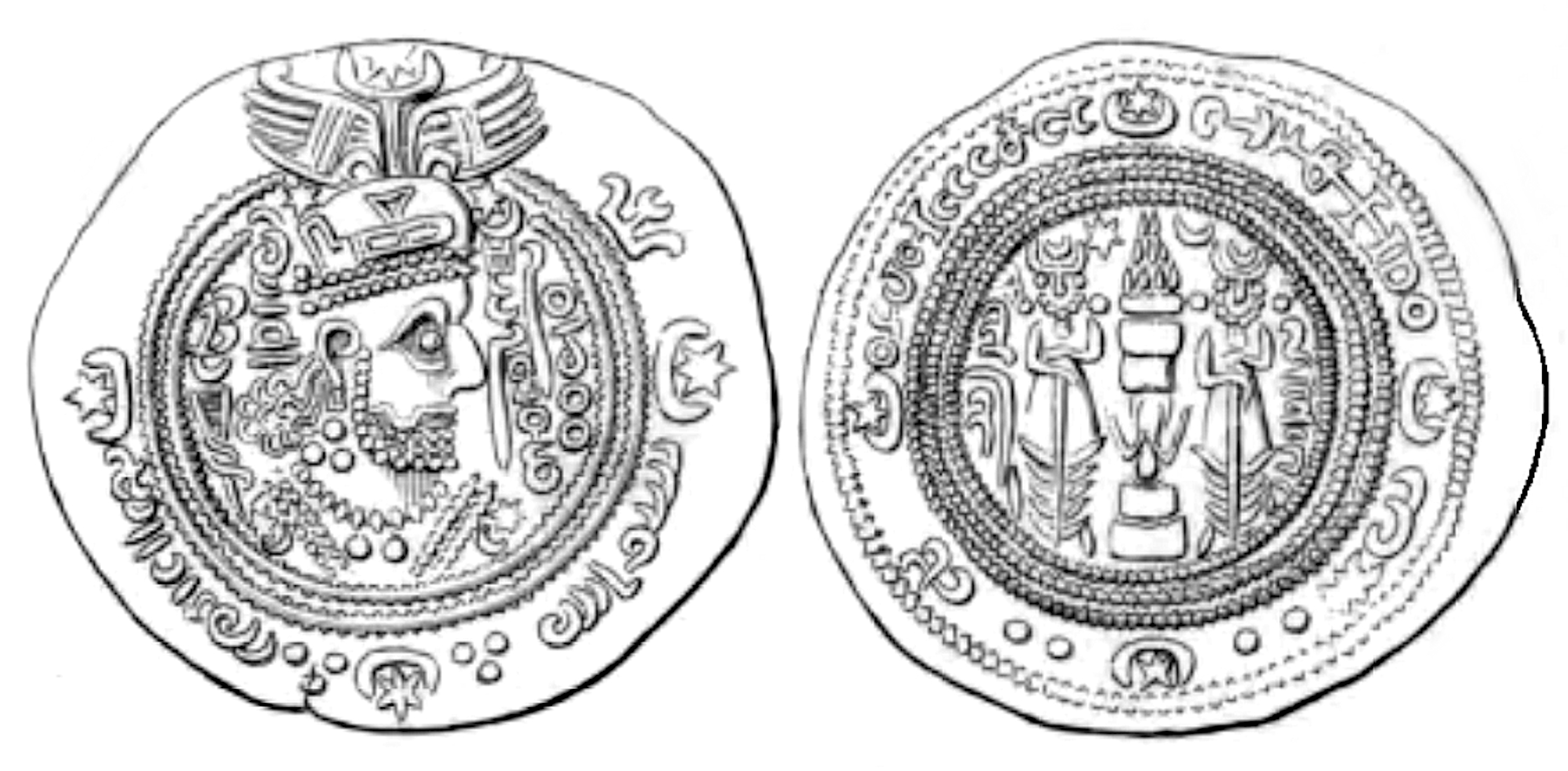
Zhulād of Gōzgān was an Iranian ruler of the region of Guzgan, and a vassal of the Yabghus of Tokharistan. Coinage date 688 CE.

According to the chronicles of the Chinese Cefu Yuangui, a young brother of Pantu Nili named Puluo (僕羅 púluó in Chinese sources) again visited the Tang court in 718 and gave an account of the military forces in the Tokharistan region. Puluo described the power of "the Kings of Tokharistan", explaining that "Two hundred and twelve kingdoms, governors and prefects" recognize the authority of the Yabghus, and that it has been so since the time of his grandfather, that is, probably since the time of the establishment of the Yabghus of Tokharistan. This account also shows that the Yabghu of Tokharistan ruled a vast area circa 718 CE, formed of the territories north and south of the Hindu Kush, including the areas of Kabul and Zabul. The territory of Guzgan was also mentioned among the territories controlled by the Yabghus.

Part of the Chinese entry for this account by Puluo is:

六年十一月丁未阿史特勒僕羅上書訴曰：僕羅克吐火羅葉護部下管諸國王都督刺史總二百一十二人謝颺國王統領兵馬二十萬眾罽賔國王統領兵馬二十萬眾骨吐國王石汗那國王解蘇國王石匿國王悒達國王護密國王護時健國王范延國王久越德建國王勃特山王各領五萬眾。僕羅祖父已來並是上件諸國之王蕃望尊重。
On the Dingwei day of the eleventh month in the sixth year [of the Kaiyuan era (713–741 CE)], Ashi Tegin Puluo writes to the emperor: the Kings of States, Commander-in-chiefs (都督 Dudu) and Regional Inspectors (刺史 Cishi) under the Yabghu of Tokharistan, (Note: 葉護吐火羅 Yehu of Tuhuoluo) the elder brother of Puluo, number two hundred and twelve, in all. The king of Zabul (Note: 謝颺 Xieyang. "The state of Xieyang (Zābulistān) was located between Kabuland and Kandahar.") is in charge of infantry and cavalry numbering two hundred thousand, and the king of Kabul (Note: 罽賔, Kabul or Jibin depending on the source.) is also in charge of two hundred thousand infantry and cavalry. The Kings of the States of Khuttal, (Note: 骨吐國 Gutuo-guo) Chaghanian, (Note: 石汗那國 Shihanna-guo "The state of Shihanna (Čaghaniyān) was located in Denau on the upper stream of the Surkhan River") Jiesu, (Note: 解蘇國 Jiesu-guo "The state of Jiesu was simply the state of Yuman (Shūmān) near presentday Dushanbe") Shughnan, (Note: 石匿國 Shini) Yeda, (Note: 悒達國 Yida "Yida is simply Yeda" "Taihan 太汗都督府 or Dahan 大汗" was the "former territory of the Hephthalites (Yeda 嚈噠), the city of Huolu 活路 (modern Mazār-e Sherif, Afghanistan)") Humi, (Note: 護密國 Humi-guo "The state of Humi (Komedae) was located in present-day Sarik-Čaupan and the surrounding area in the Wakhan valley.") Guzganan, (Note: 護時健國 Hushijian-guo "The state of Hushijian (Gūzgānān) was located between Merv and Balkh") Bamiyan, (Note: 范延國 Fanyan-guo) Quwādhiyān, (Note: 久越德建國 Jiuyuedejian-guo "The state of Jiuyuedejian (Quwādhiyān) was on the lower stream of the Kafirnihan River, near present-day Qobadian") and Badakhshan (Note: 勃特山 Boteshan) each lead fifty thousand troops. Since the grandfather of Puluo, the Yehu Tuhuolo [Yabghu of Tokharistan] has become king of the above-mentioned states: he is greatly respected."

— Cefu Yuangui 3.5. Fanyan in Vol. 999 (Claims, Foreign Subjects), 718 CE.

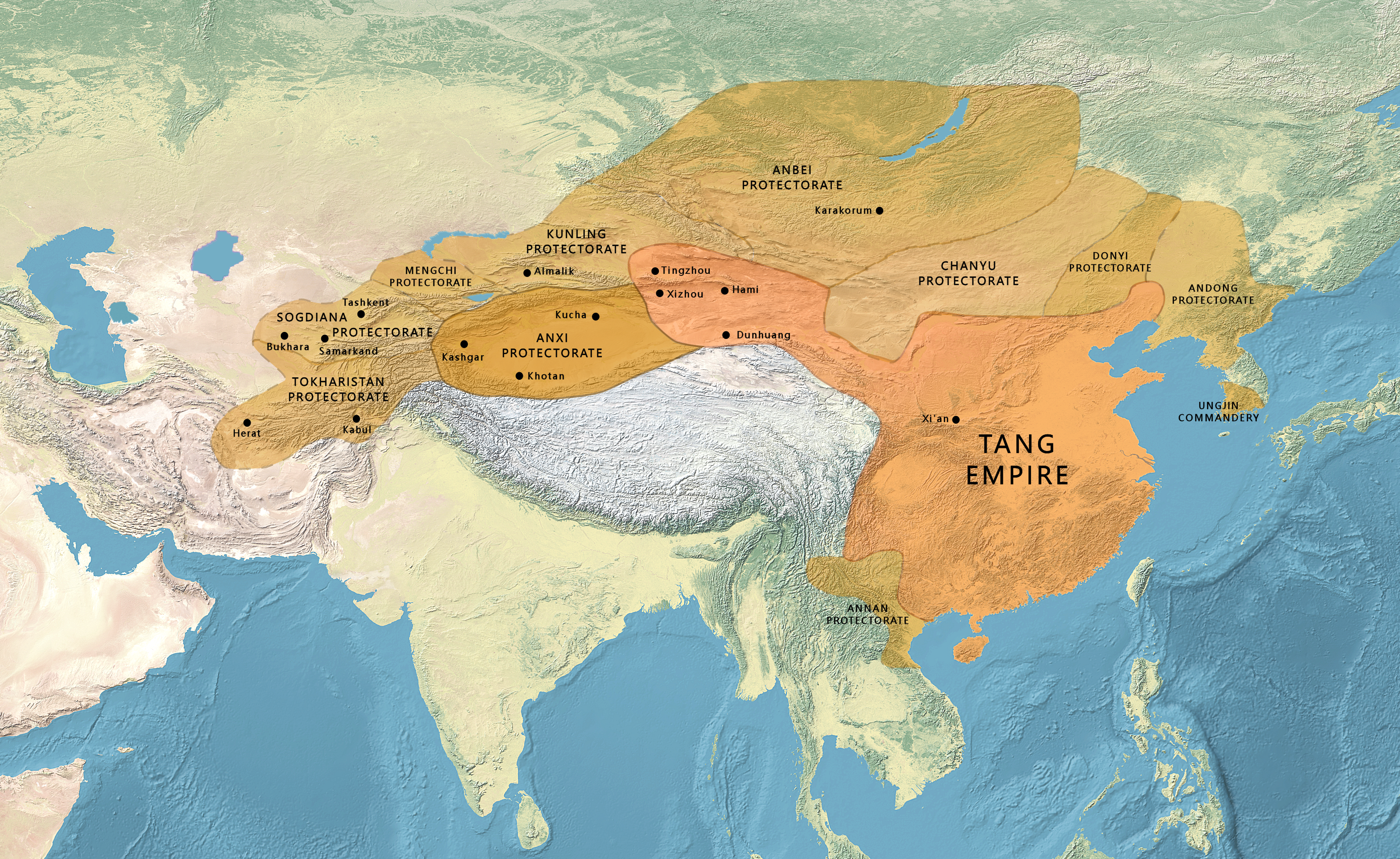
Major protectorates of the Tang dynasty c. 660, including the territory of the Tokhara Yabghus as the "Tokharistan Protectorate", following the campaigns against the Eastern Turks (629), the Western city-states (640–648) and the Western Turks (657).

Puluo, writing in 718 CE, finally reaffirmed the loyalty of the Tokhara Yabghus towards the Tang dynasty, probably since the time of the fall of the Western Turks to China (657), confirming at least nominal control of the Chinese administration over the region for the last sixty years:

然火羅葉護積代已來，於大唐忠赤，朝貢不絕。
The Yabghus of Tokharistan, for several generations until now, have been sincerely devoted to the great Tang dynasty, they have without interruption paid their respects and brought tribute.

— Cefu Yuangui 3.5. Fanyan in Vol. 999 (Claims, Foreign Subjects), 718 CE.

==== Temporary conquest of Khorasan over the Arabs (689–710 CE) ====
c. 689 CE, the Hephthalite ruler of Badghis and the Arab rebel Musa ibn Abd Allah ibn Khazim, son of the Zubayrid governor of Khurasan Abd Allah ibn Khazim al-Sulami, allied against the forces of the Umayyad Caliphate. The Hepthalites and their allies captured Termez in 689, repelled the Arabs, and occupied the whole region of Khorasan for a brief period, with Termez as they capital, described by the Arabs as "the headquarters of the Hephthalites" (dār mamlakat al-Hayāṭela).

The Arabs of the Umayyad Caliphate under Yazid ibn al-Muhallab re-captured Termez in 704. Nezak Tarkan, the ruler of the Hephthalites of Badghis, led a new revolt in 709 with the support of other principalities as well as his nominal ruler, the Yabghu of Tokharistan. In 710, Qutaiba ibn Muslim was able to re-establish Muslim control over Tokharistan and captured Nizak Tarkan who was executed on al-Hajjaj's orders, despite promises of pardon, while the Yabghu was exiled to Damascus and kept there as a hostage.

==== Contacts with the Byzantine Empire ====
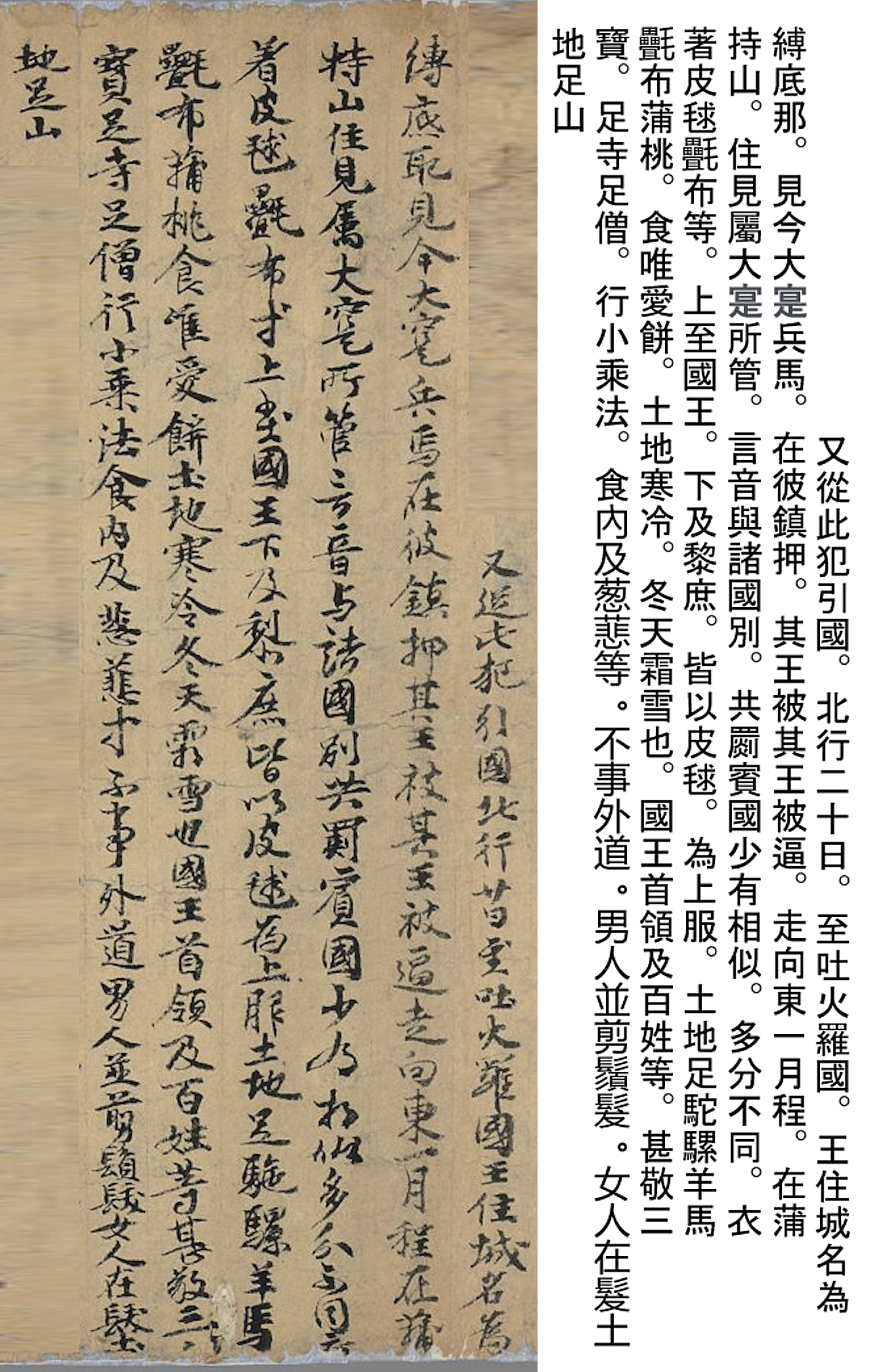
Account of Tokharistan by Korean Buddhist pilgrim Hui Chao in 726 CE.

The Byzantine Emperor Leo III the Isaurian who had defeated their common enemy the Arabs in 717 CE, sent an embassy to China through Central Asia in 719 CE which probably met with the Tokhara Yabghus and the Turk Shahis, who in honour of the Byzantine Emperor even named one of their own rulers "Caesar of Rome" (which they rendered phonetically as King "Fromo Kesaro"). (Note: Martin 2011, p. 127:"He received this laudatory epithet because he, like the Byzantines, was successful at holding back the Muslim conquerors.") The Chinese annals record that "In the first month of the seventh year of the period Kaiyuan [719 CE] their Lord [拂菻王, "the King of Fulin"] sent the Ta-shou-ling [an officer of high rank] of T'u-huo-lo [吐火羅, Tokhara] (...) to offer lions and ling-yang [antelopes], two of each. A few months after, he further sent Ta-te-seng ["priests of great virtue"] to our court with tribute."

=== Chinese sources ===
Turk ("T’u-chüeh") kingdoms were in the territories of Gandhara, Kapisa and Zabulistan around 723–729 CE, according to the testimony the Korean pilgrim Hui Chao. Huei-chao also mentioned that in 726 CE, the Arabs occupied Balkh, and the Turks were forced to flee to Badakshan:

I arrived in Tokharistan (吐火羅國 Tuhuoluo-guo). The home city of the king is called Balkh (縛底那). At this time the troops of the Arabs (大寔國) (Note: This is the first mention of the Arab as "Dashi" (大寔 or 大食) in a Chinese text. See The Silk Road Encyclopedia. Seoul Selection. 18 July 2016. p. 782. ISBN 978-1-62412-076-3.) are there and they occupy it. Its King, Wives and Court was forced to flee one month's journey to the east and lives in Badakhshan. Now Balkh belongs to the Arabs' domain. (...) The King, the nobles and the people revere the Three Jewels (Buddhism). There are many monasteries and monks; they practice the Hinayana teachings.

— Hui Chao, Memoir of the pilgrimage to the five kingdoms of India, 726 CE.

Chinese sources mention a few years later yabghus who sent missions to the Tang court: Ku-tu-lu Tun Ta-tu (Qutluγ Ton Tardu) asked for help against the Arabs in 729 CE, Shih-li-mang-kia-lo (Sri Mangala) asked for help against the Tibetans in 749 CE, and received this help from the Chinese, and in 758 CE Wu-na-to (Udita?) visited in person the Chinese court and participated in the fight against the rebel An Lu-shan.

In the Nestorian Stele of Xi'an, erected in 781 CE, the Nestorian monk Jingjing mentioned in Syriac that his grandfather was a missionary-priest from Balkh in Tokharistan.

== Kapisa-Gandhara ==
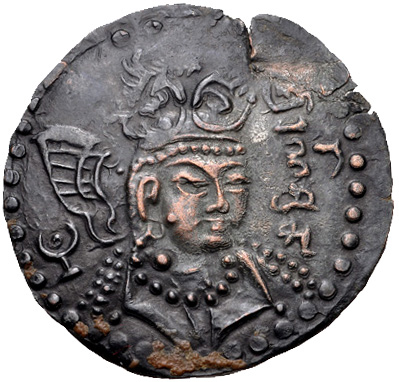
An early Turk Shahi ruler named Sri Ranasrikari "The Lord who brings excellence through war" (Brahmi script:). In this realistic portrait, he wears a triple-crescent crown and the Turkic double-lapel caftan. Late 7th to early 8th century CE.

In the area of Kapisa-Gandhara, the Turk Shahi (665–850 CE), a probable political extension and vassals of the neighbouring Yabghus of Tokharistan, remained an obstacle to the eastward expansion of the Abbasid Caliphate.

c. 650 CE, the Arabs attacked Shahi territory from the west, and captured Kabul. But the Turk Shahi were able to mount a counter-offensive and repulsed the Arabs, taking back the areas of Kabul and Zabulistan (around Ghazni), as well as the region of Arachosia as far as Kandahar. The Arabs again failed to capture Kabul and Zabulistan in 697–698 CE, and their general Yazid ibn Ziyad was killed in the action. A few years later however the Arabs defeated and killed the Kabul Shah and conquered Kabul under Umayyad general Qutayba ibn Muslim.

Nezak Tarkhan, the ruler of the Hephthalites of Badghis, led a revolt against the Arabs in 709 with the support of other principalities as well as his nominal ruler, the Yabghu of Tokharistan. In 710, the Umayyad general Qutayba ibn Muslim was able to re-establish Muslim control over Tokharistan and captured Nizak Tarkhan, who was executed on the orders of al-Hajjaj ibn Yusuf, while the Yabghus, who had ruled parts of Tokharistan as well as Badakhshan, was exiled to Damascus and kept there as a hostage.

From 719 CE, Tegin Shah was the king of the Turk Shahis. He then abdicated in 739 CE in favour of his son Fromo Kesaro, probable phonetic transcription of "Caesar of Rome" in honor of "Caesar", the title of the then East Roman Emperor Leo III the Isaurian who had defeated their common enemy the Arabs in 717 CE, and sent an embassy through Central Asia in 719 CE. (Note: Martin 2011, p. 127:"He received this laudatory epithet because he, like the Byzantines, was successful at holding back the Muslim conquerors.") Fromo Kesaro appears to have fought vigorously against the Arabs, and his victories may have forged the Tibetan epic legend of King Phrom Ge-sar.

The Turk Shahis eventually weakened against the Arabs in the late 9th century CE. Kandahar, Kabul and Zabul were lost to the Arabs, while in Gandhara the Hindu Shahi took over. The last Shahi ruler of Kabul, Lagaturman, was deposed by a Brahmin minister, possibly named Vakkadeva, in c. 850, signaling the end of the Buddhist Turk Shahi dynasty, and the beginning of the Hindu Shahi dynasty of Kabul.

== Local art at the time of the Yabghus of Tokharistan (7th–8th century CE) ==
These was a relatively high level of artistic activity in the areas controlled by the Yabghus of Tokharistan during 7th–8th centuries CE, either as a result of the Sasanian cultural heritage, or as a result of the continued development of Buddhist art. The works of art of this period in Afghanistan, with a sophistication and cosmopolitanism comparable to other works of art of the Silk Road such as those of Kizil, are attributable to the sponsorship of the Turks.

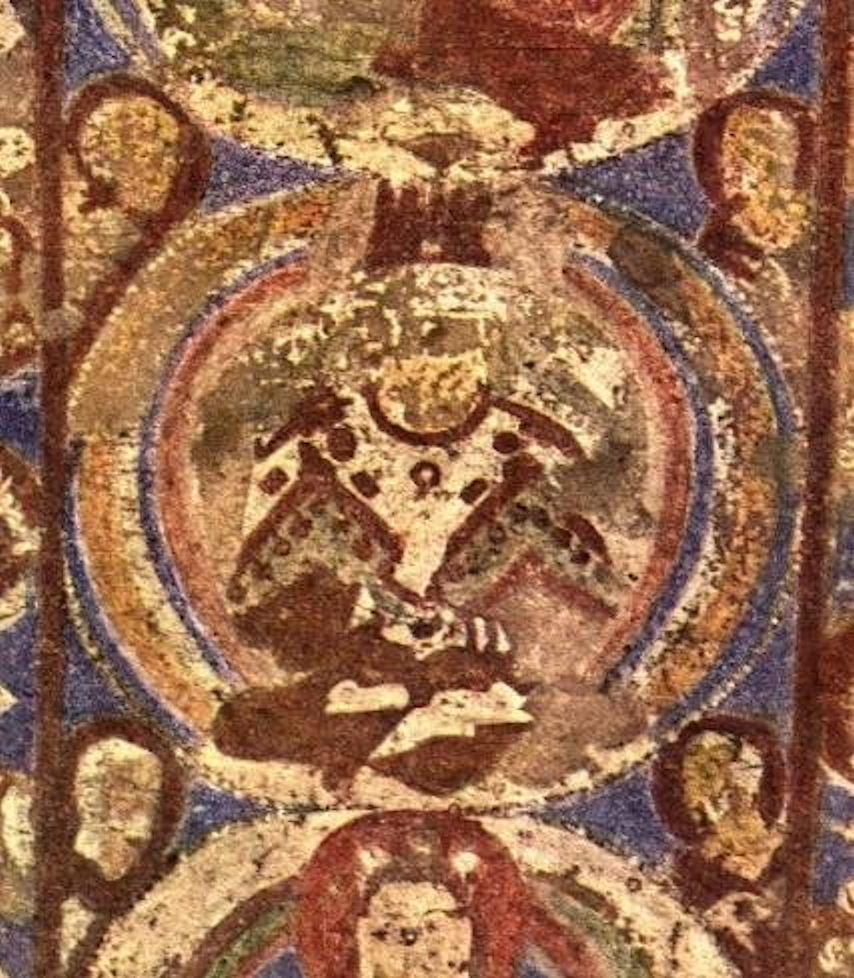
Buddha wearing a crown and cape. Painting in niche "I" at Bamiyan, 7th century CE.

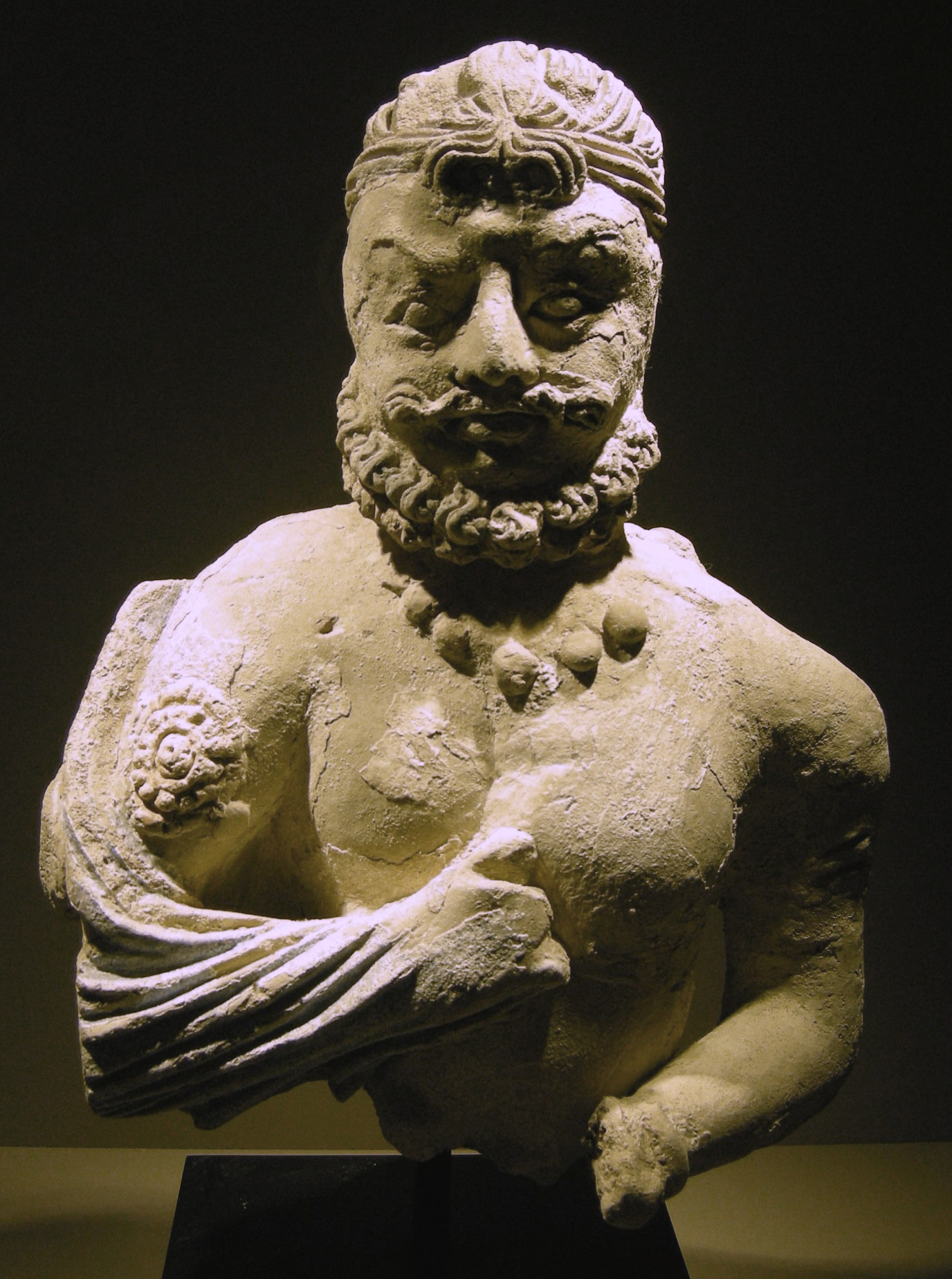
Male mythological figure, Tokharistan, 7th–8th century CE

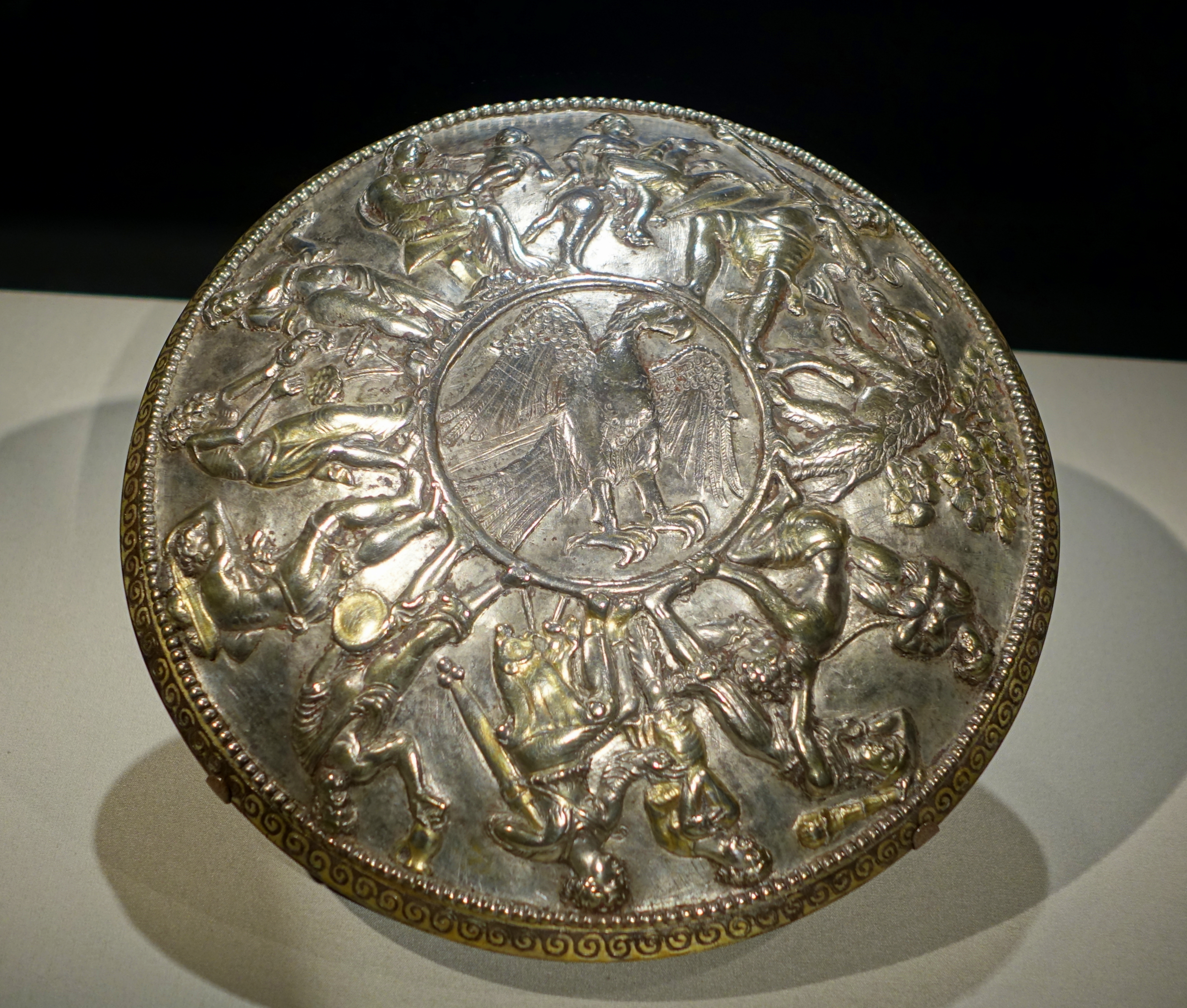
Shallow bowl, probably from Afghanistan (said to have been discovered in northwestern India), Sasanian period, 5th–7th century CE.

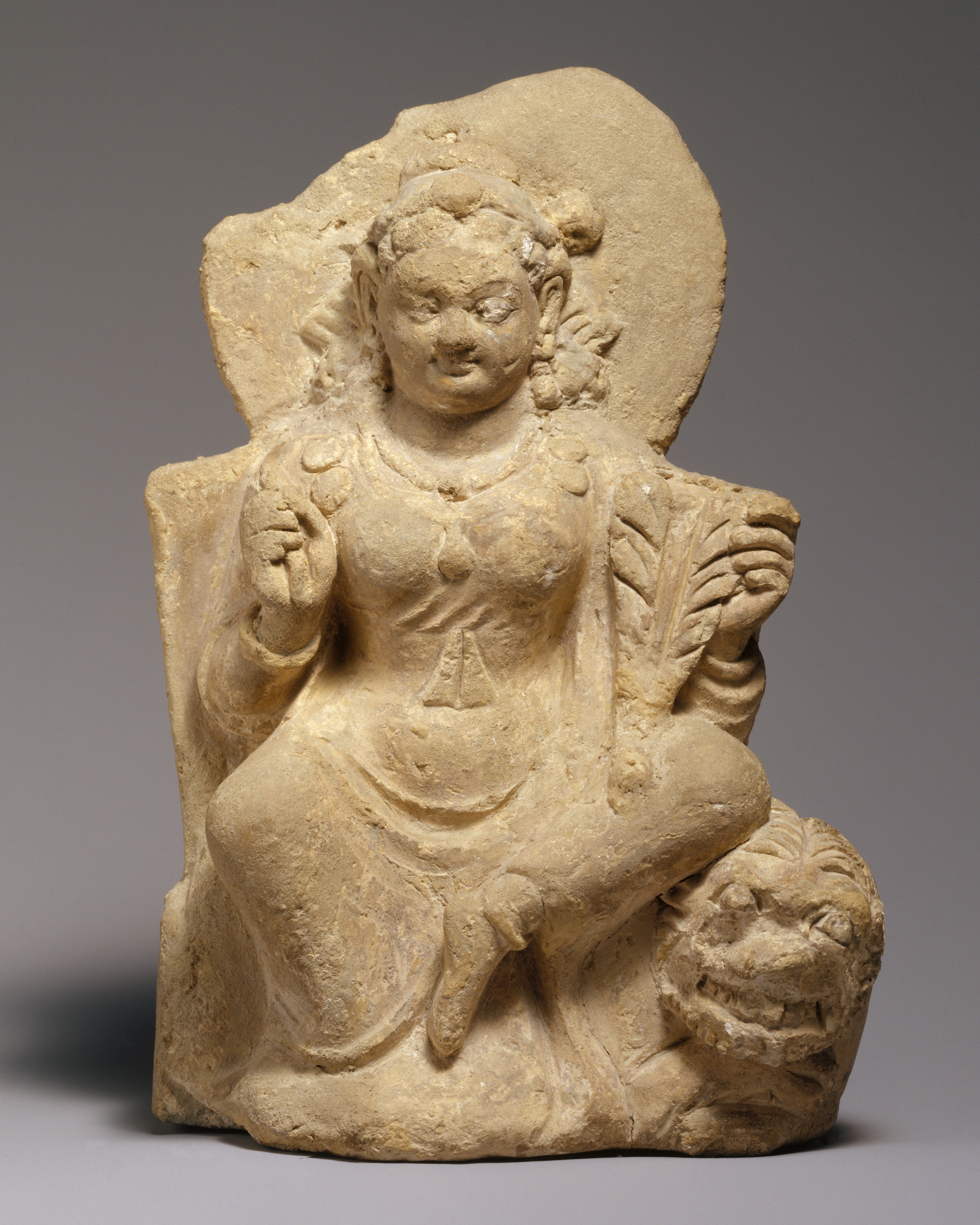
Goddess, possibly Nana, seated on a lion, 5th–6th century, Afghanistan, Hephthalite or Turkic period.

=== Buddhism ===
Buddhism in Tokharistan is said to have enjoyed a revival under the Turks. Several monasteries of Tokharistan dated to the 7th–8th centuries display beautiful Buddhist works of art, such as Kalai Kafirnigan, Ajina Tepe, Khisht Tepe or Kafyr Kala, around which Turkic nobility and populations followed Hinayana Buddhism. The Turks were apparently quite tolerant of other religions.

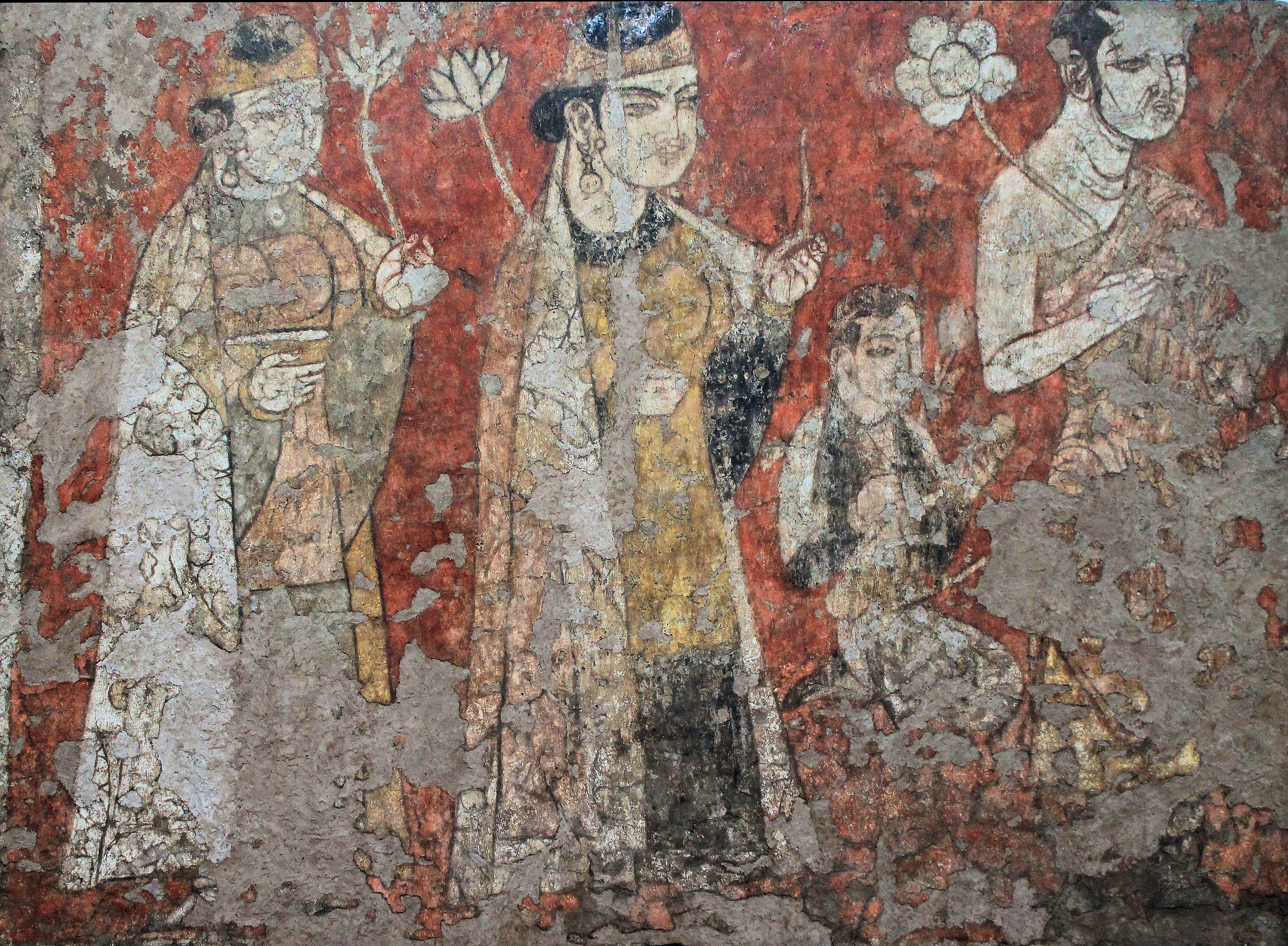
Buddhist mural from Kalai Kafirnigan, Museum of National Antiquities, Dushanbe, Tajikistan. 7th–early 8th century.

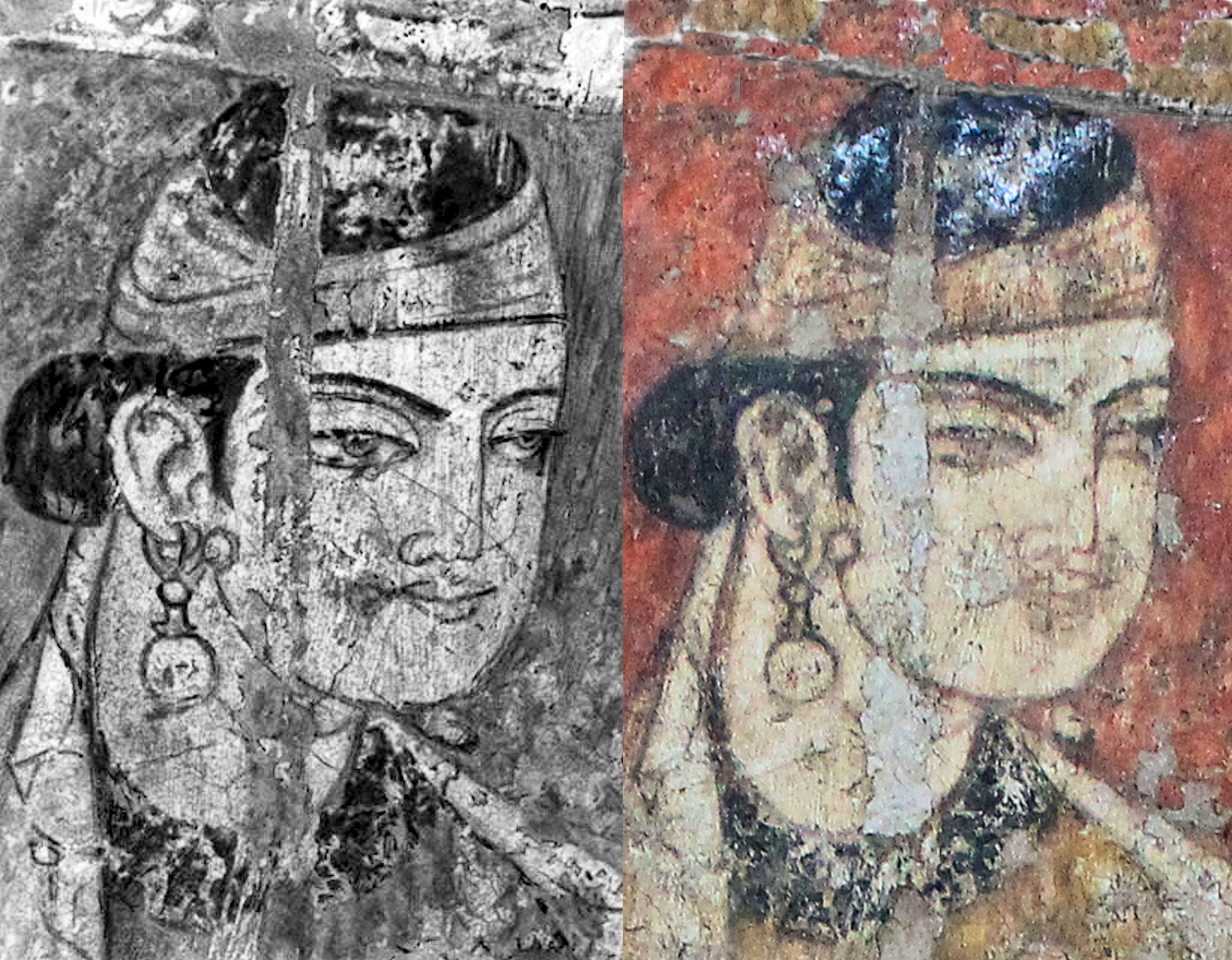
Female devotee in Kalai Kafirnigan. 7th–early 8th century.

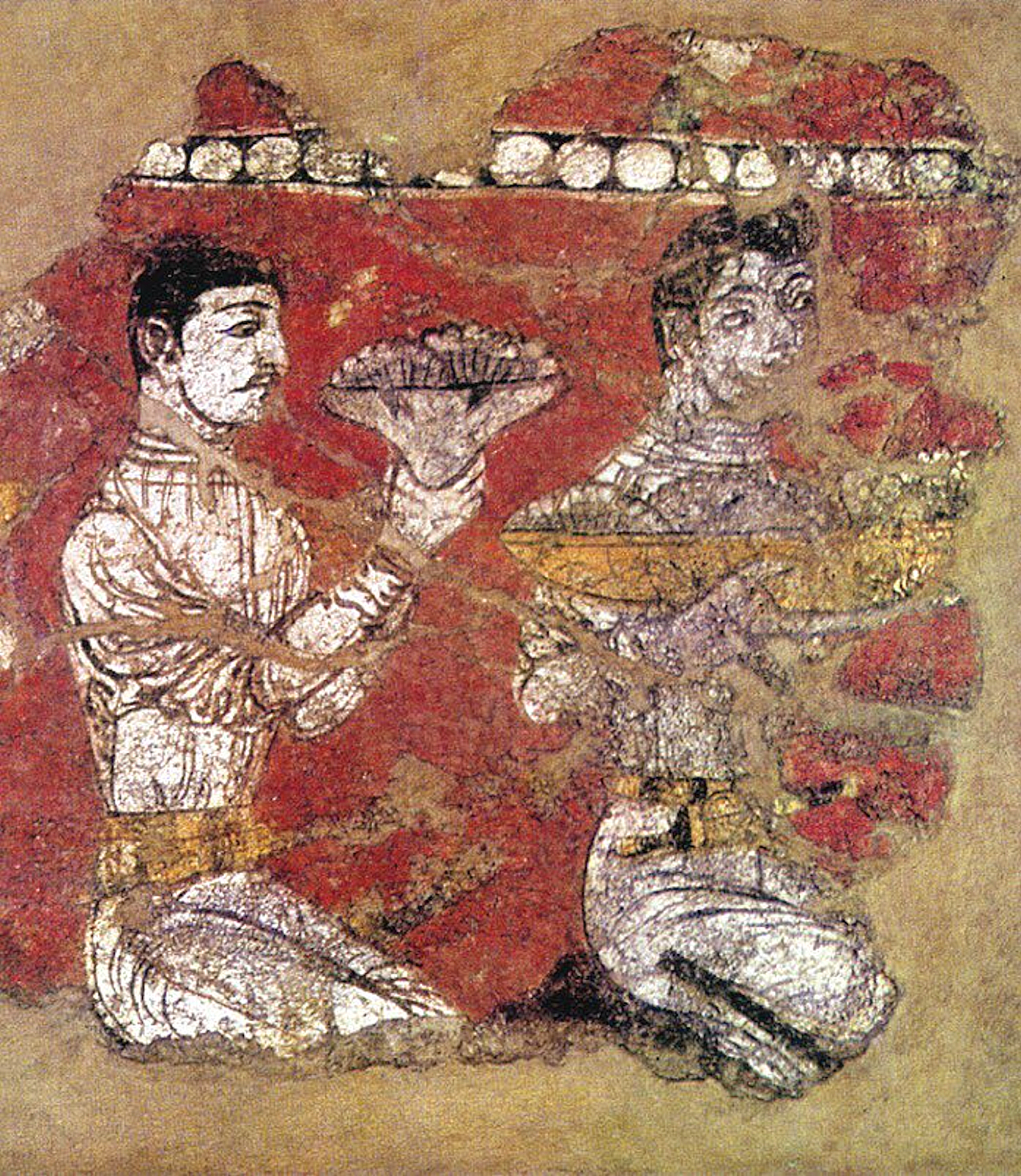
Ajina-Tepe Buddhist mural, Tajikistan, 7th–8th century CE

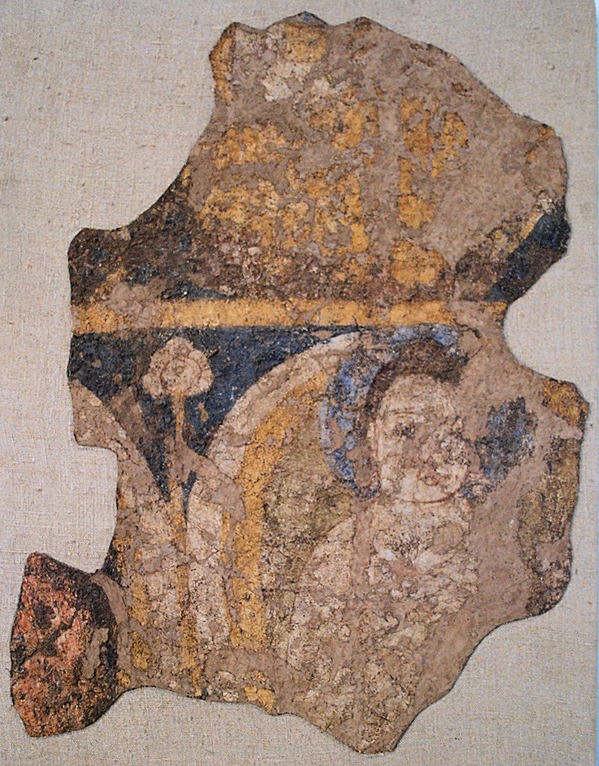
Buddhist mural from the monastery at Ajina Tepe. Dushanbe – National Museum of Antiquities.

=== Bamiyan murals and their devotees ===
The mural paintings of Bamiyan display male devotees in double-lapel caftans, also attributable to the local sponsorship of the Western Turks.

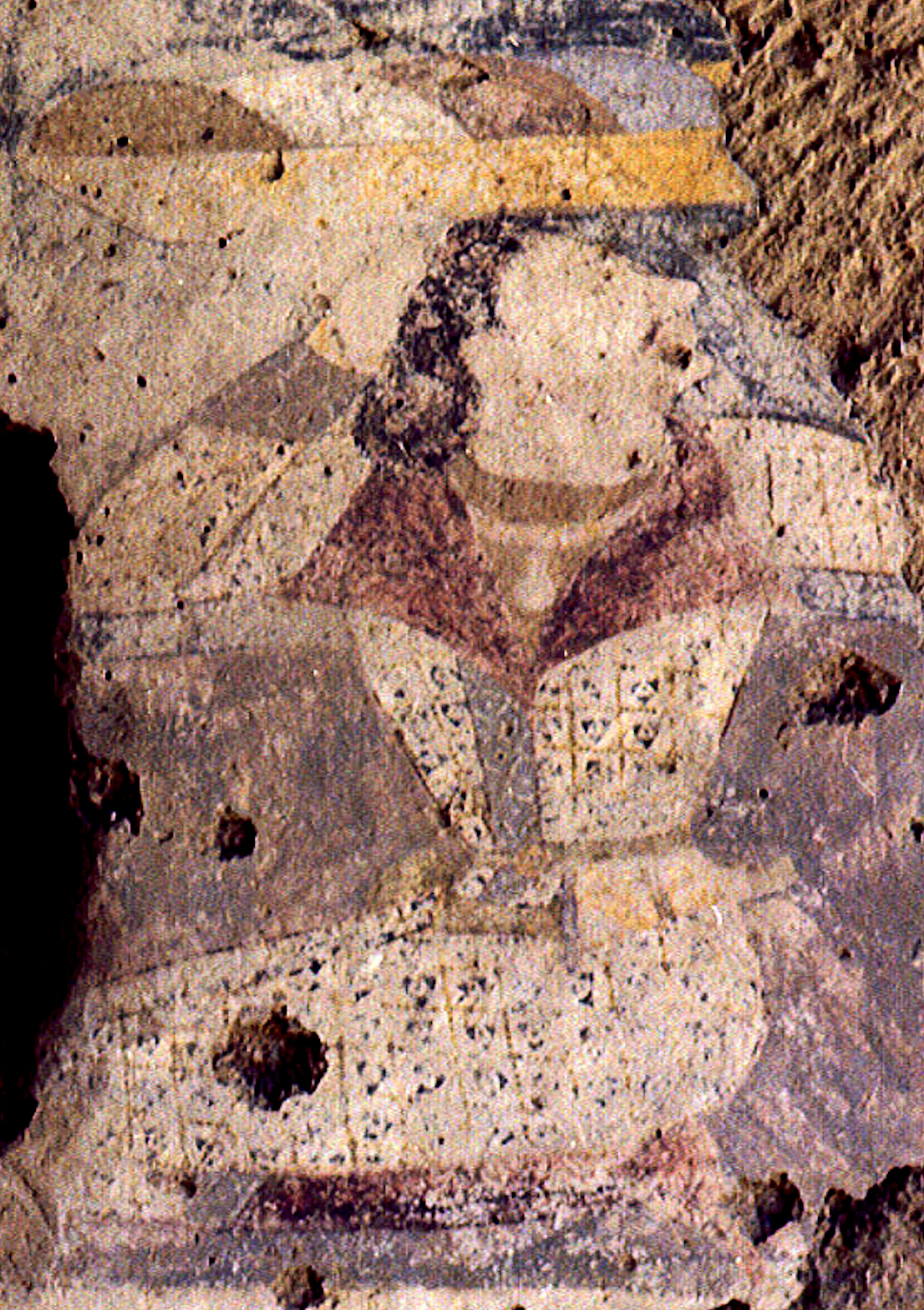
Devotee in double-lapel caftan, left wall of the niche of the 53 meter Buddha. Bamiyan

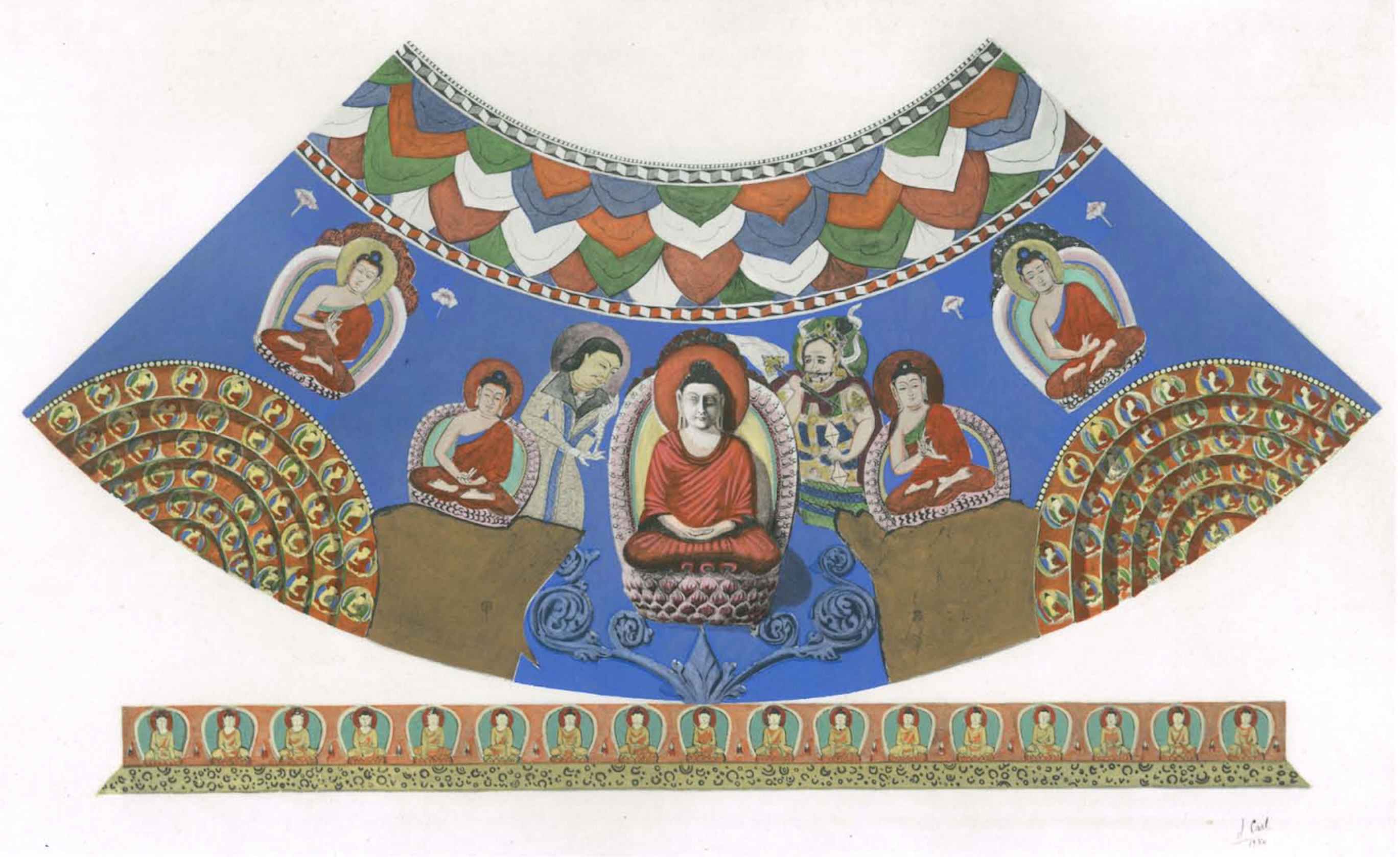
The Buddha and devotee in caftan. Bamiyan

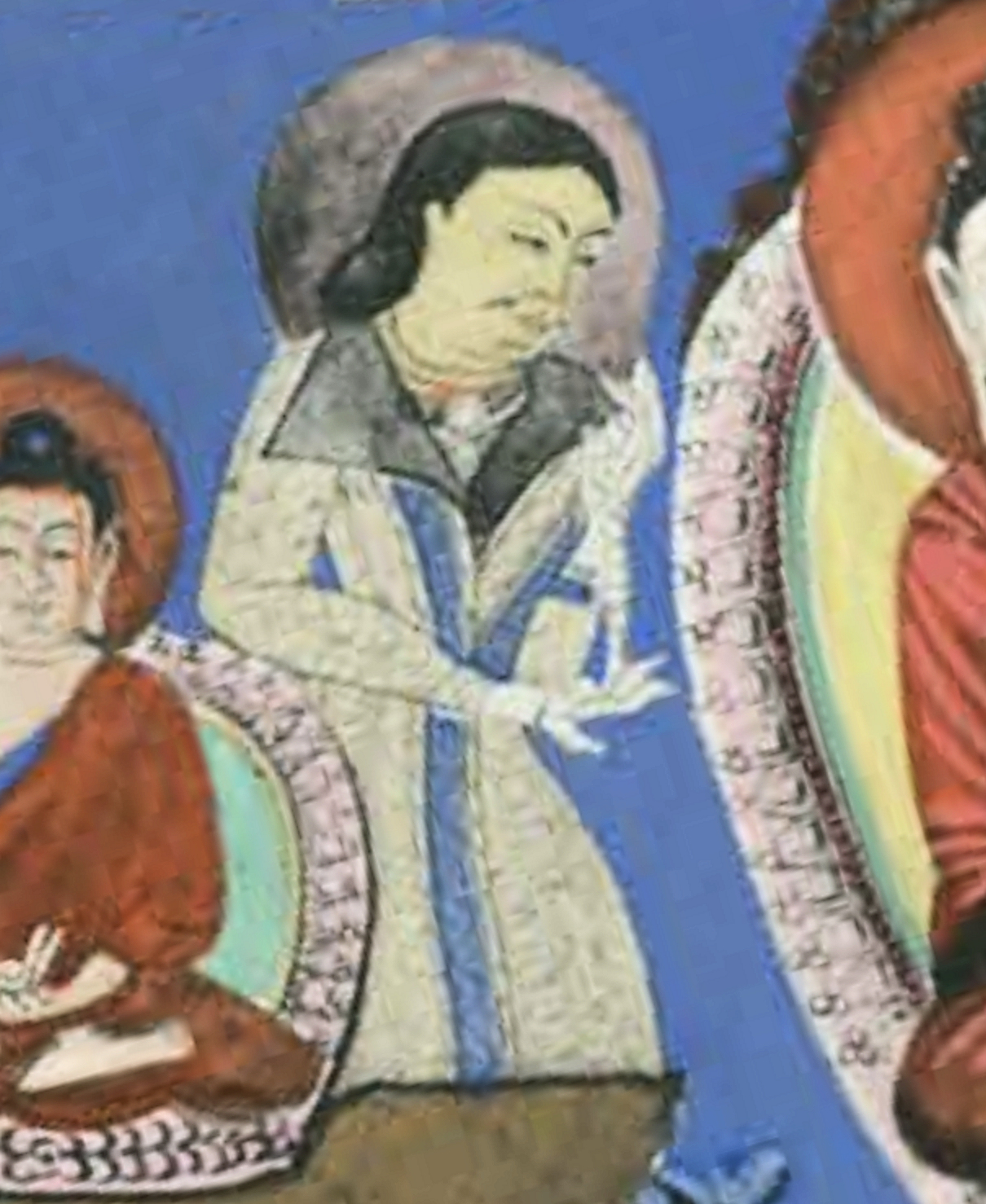
Devotee in caftan, next to the Buddha. Bamiyan (detail)

== List of known Yabghus ==
1. Tardush Shad (625-630) - son of Tong Yabghu Qaghan.
2. Ishbara Tegin (630-650?) - son of Tardush Shad.
3. Sem Yabghu (650?-653) - might be the same person as Wushismu Yabghu.
4. Wu-shis-poh Yabghu (?-?) - real name unknown, Might be the same person as Wushismu Yabghu.
5. Wu-shih-mu Yabghu (653-660) - real name unknown but reconstructed as 'Asem' or 'Asum' by scholar B.A. Litvinsky.
6. Kün Ishbara Yabghu (?-?) - known from coins.
7. Pantu Nili Yabghu (?-?) - a distant relative of Ishbara Tegin, installed by Ashina Mishe on the throne, might be the same Yabghu that got captured by Arab army in 710.
8. Qutluq Ton Tardu (729?- before 749)
9. Shih-li-manq Yabghu (?-?) - real name unknown. In 758, a diplomat was sent to China for help, but it is not known whether Shihlimanq was in charge at the time.

== Sources ==
- Alram, Michael; Filigenzi, Anna; Kinberger, Michaela; Nell, Daniel; Pfisterer, Matthias; Vondrovec, Klaus (2012–2013). "The Countenance of the other (The Coins of the Huns and Western Turks in Central Asia and India) 2012–2013 exhibit". Vienna, Austria: Kunsthistorisches Museum, Coin Cabinet. Archived from the original on 25 November 2020.
- Beckwith, Christopher (2009). Empires of the Silk Road. Princeton University Press.
- Rezakhani, Khodadad (2017). ReOrienting the Sasanians: East Iran in Late Antiquity. Edinburgh University Press. pp. 1–256. ISBN 9781474400305.
- Kennedy, Hugh (2007). The Great Arab Conquests: How the Spread of Islam Changed the World We Live In. Philadelphia, Pennsylvania: Da Capo Press. ISBN 978-0-306-81740-3.
- Martin, Dan (2011). "Greek and Islamic Medicines' Historical Contact with Tibet". In Akasoy, Anna; Burnett, Charles; Yoeli-Tlalim, Ronit (eds.). Islam and Tibet: Interactions Along the Musk Routes. Farnham, Surrey: Ashgate Publishing. pp. 117–144. ISBN 978-0-7546-6956-2.
- Shaban, M. A. (1970). The ʿAbbāsid Revolution. Cambridge: Cambridge University Press. ISBN 0-521-29534-3.
- Gibb, H. A. R. (1923). The Arab Conquests in Central Asia. London: The Royal Asiatic Society.
