= Kohistani =

Kohistani (meaning 'something from the mountainous land' in Persian) may refer to:

- something of, from, or related to one of the places known as Kohistan
  - A surname for someone from 'Kohistan'
- Kohistani people, an Indo-Aryan ethnic group of Kohistan, northern Pakistan
- Indus Kohistani, an Indo-Aryan language of northern Pakistan
- Kohistani Shina language, a Shina variety spoken in northern Pakistan
- Kohistani languages, a group of Indo-Aryan languages that includes Indus Kohistani, but does not include Kohistani Shina
- Indus Kohistani people
- Mir Asadullah Kohistani, former Afghan Army general and commander of Bagram Airfield in 2021 during the Taliban offensive

== People with the surname ==
- Abdul Sabur Farid Kohistani (1952–2007), Prime Minister of Afghanistan during 1992
- Afzal Kohistani, Pakistani involved in the 2012 Kohistan video case
- Freshta Kohistani (1991–2020), Afghan women's rights activist
- Hammasa Kohistani (born 1987), British-Afghan model
- Shamila Kohestani, (born 1988), Afghan-American woman soccer player
- Israfeel Kohistani (born 1987), Afghan footballer
- Tahmina Kohistani (born 1989), Afghan sprinter

== See also ==
- Kohistan (disambiguation)
