= Tardush Shad =

- Yabgu of Tokharistan
- Reign: 625–630
- Successor: Ishbara Yabgu
- Died: 630; Kunduz
- Issue: Ishbara Yabgu
- House: Ashina tribe
- Father: Tong Yabgu Qaghan
- Religion: Buddhism

Tardush Shad (Chinese: 達頭设; pinyin: Dátóu Shè) — was a Yabghu of Tokharistan. He was a son of Tong Yabgu Qaghan.

== Reign ==
In 618 or 625 Tong Yabgu invaded Tokharistan and forced Hephthalite principalities to submit. According to Cefu Yuangui, these principalities were Zabulistan, Kapisa-Gandhara, Khuttal, Chaghaniyan, Shignan, Shuman, Badhgis, Wakhan, Guzgan, Bamiyan, Kobadiyan and Badakhshan, when Pantu Nili – a later yabgu of Tokharistan submitted to Tang. He installed his son Tardu in Kunduz to rule over with title of Tokharistan Yabgu (Chinese: 吐火羅葉護; pinyin: Tǔhuǒluó Yèhù).

== Family and death ==
He was married two times, both times to a daughter of Qu Boya (麴伯雅) ruler of Gaochang. When Xuanzang visited Kunduz, he also brought a letter from his brother-in-law and ruler of Gaochang Qu Wentai (麴文泰) to Tardu. Yabgu received him despite being ill. Tardu advised him to make a trip westward to Balkh (modern Afghanistan), to see Buddhist sites and relics. Xuanzang also witnessed a palace scandal when Tardu's firstborn son Ishbara Tegin fell in love with his new step-mother (also aunt) and poisoned Tardu in 630.
