= Kohistan District, Faryab =

Kohistan کوهستان
- District
- Location within Afghanistan
- Coordinates: 35°20′N 64°55′E
- Country: Afghanistan
- Province: Faryab

Government
  - Type: District council

Population (2010)
  - Total: 53,100

Kohistan (Dari: کوهستان) is the southernmost district in Faryab province. Its population is 53,100 (2010). The district center is Qal'a 35.3811°N 64.7561°E, 1909 m altitude.

On 4 May 2014, flash flooding from heavy rainfall resulted in the destruction of public facilities, roads, and agricultural land. In the Shaman Dara area, 120 families were reportedly affected (10 houses destroyed and 50 houses severely damaged), four people died (two children, two women), 200 livestock killed, 4000 jerib of agricultural land and 200 gardens damaged.
