= Central Asian art =

Central Asian art

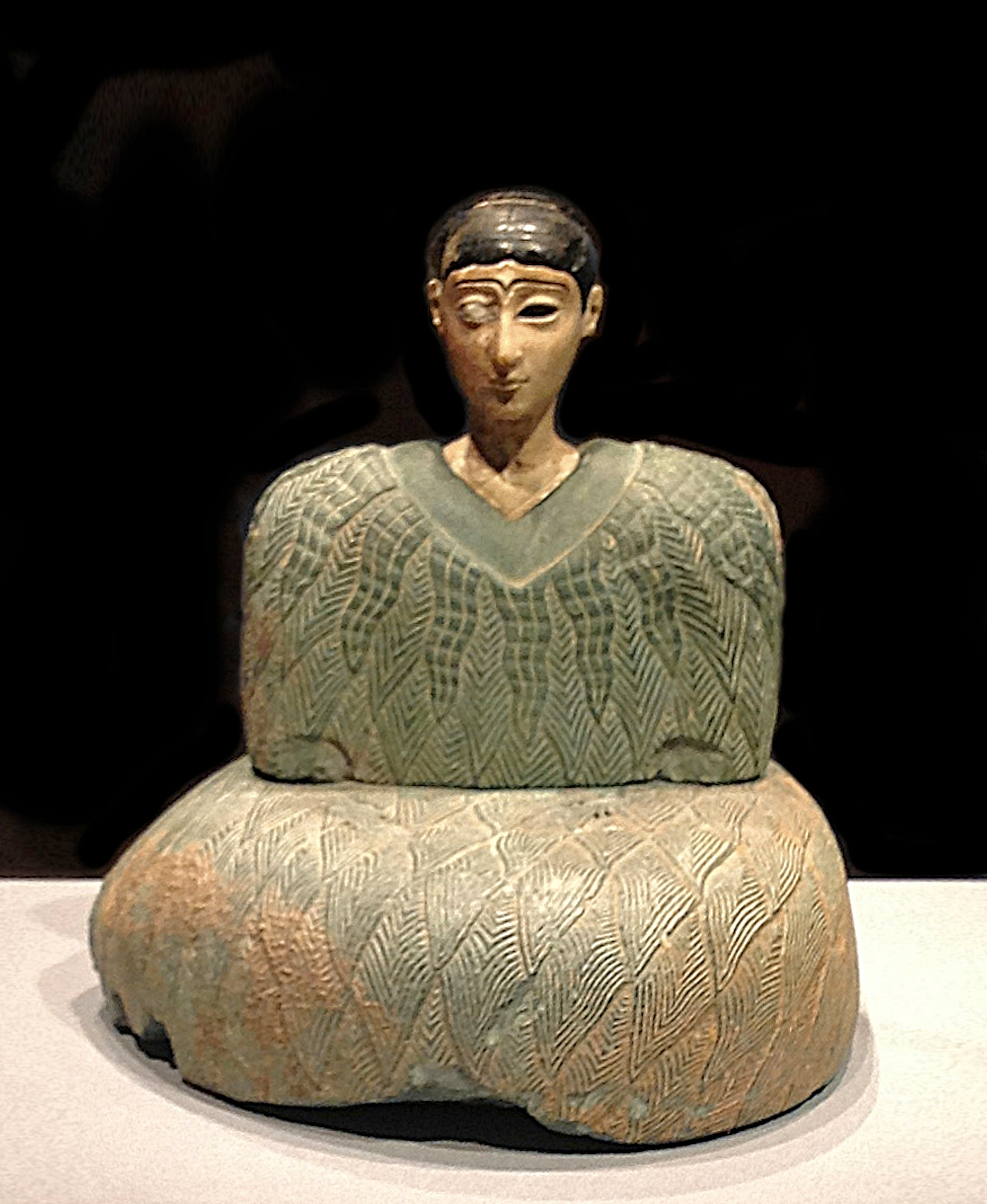
Female statuette of the Bactria–Margiana Archaeological Complex, c. 2000 BC. Miho Museum.

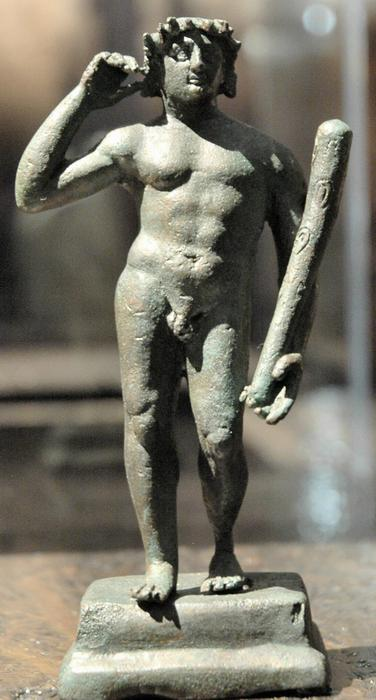
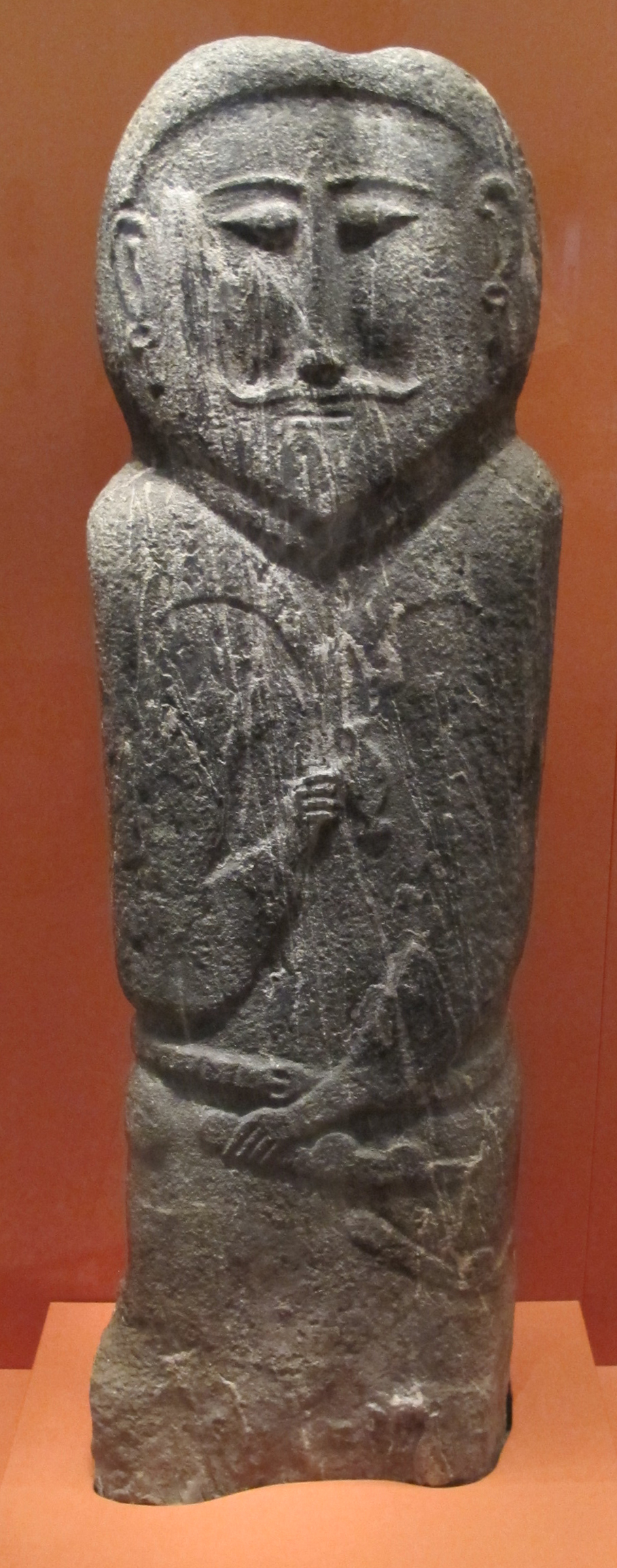
A Greco-Bactrian statuette from Ai-Khanoum (2nd century BC), and funerary statue from Kosh-Agach (8th–10th century AD).

Central Asian art is visual art created in Central Asia, in areas corresponding to modern Kyrgyzstan, Kazakhstan, Uzbekistan, Turkmenistan, Tajikistan, Afghanistan, and parts of modern Mongolia, China and Russia. The art of ancient and medieval Central Asia reflects the rich history of this vast area, home to a huge variety of peoples, religions and ways of life. The artistic remains of the region show a remarkable combinations of influences that exemplify the multicultural nature of Central Asian society. The Silk Road transmission of art, Scythian art, Greco-Buddhist art, Serindian art and more recently Persianate culture, are all part of this complicated history.

From the late second millennium BC until very recently, the grasslands of Central Asia – stretching from the Caspian Sea to central China and from southern Russia to northern India – have been home to migrating herders who practised mixed economies on the margins of sedentary societies. The prehistoric 'animal style' art of these pastoral nomads not only demonstrates their zoomorphic mythologies and shamanic traditions but also their fluidity in incorporating the symbols of sedentary society into their own artworks.

Central Asia has always been a crossroads of cultural exchange, the hub of the so-called Silk Road – that complex system of trade routes stretching from China to the Mediterranean. Already in the Bronze Age (3rd and 2nd millennium BC), growing settlements formed part of an extensive network of trade linking Central Asia to the Indus Valley, Mesopotamia and Egypt.

The arts of recent centuries are mainly influenced by Islamic art, but the varied earlier cultures were influenced by the art of China, Persia and Greece, as well as the Animal style that developed among the nomadic peoples of the steppes.

== Upper Paleolithic ==
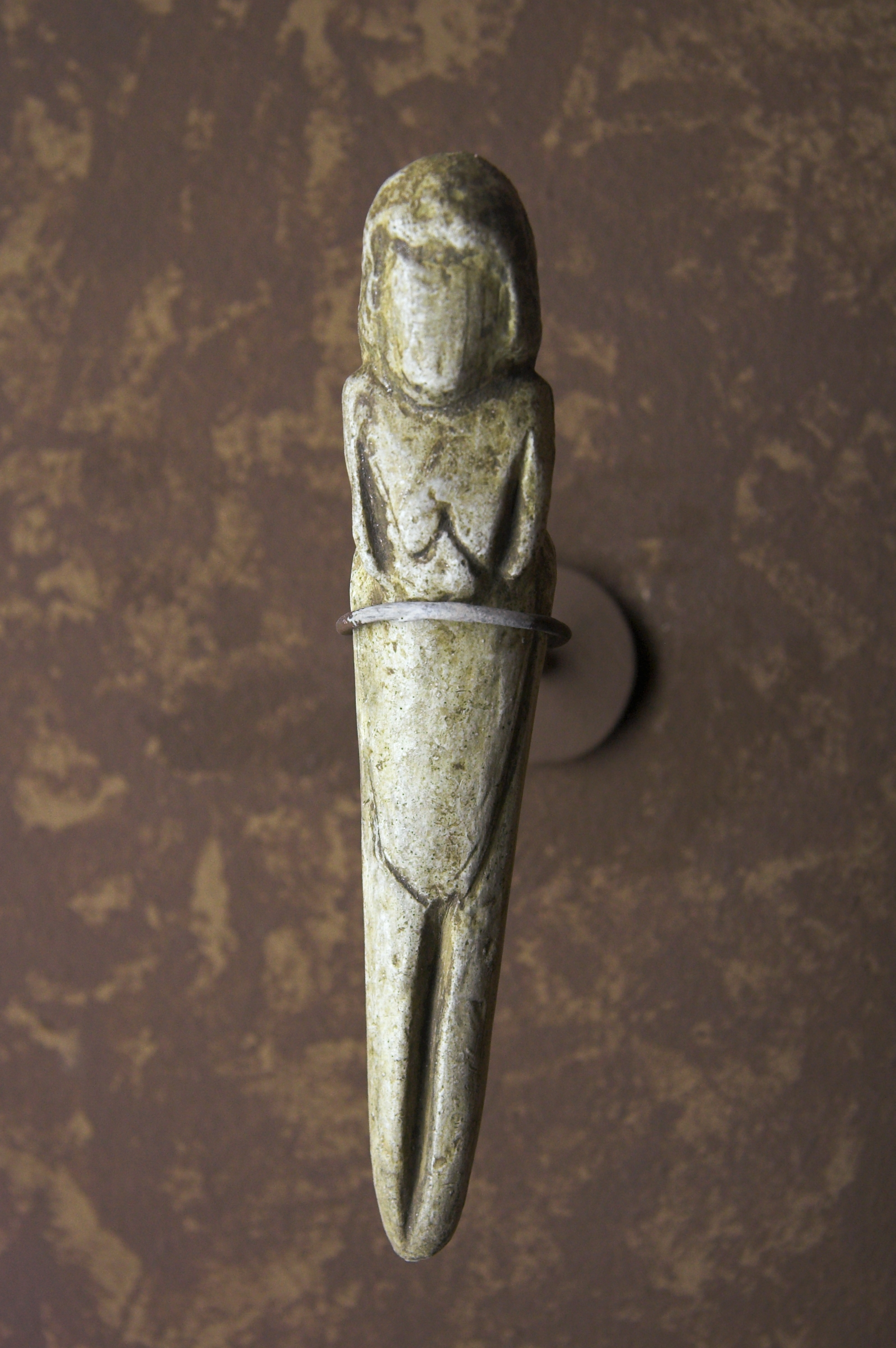
One of the Venus figurines of Mal'ta, circa 21,000 BCE

The first modern human occupation in the difficult climates of North and Central Asia is dated to circa 40,000 ago, with the early Yana culture of northern Siberia dated to circa 31,000 BCE. By around 21,000 BCE, two main cultures developed: the Mal'ta culture and slightly later the Afontova Gora-Oshurkovo culture.

The Mal'ta culture, centered around at Mal'ta, at the Angara River, near Lake Baikal in Irkutsk Oblast, Southern Siberia, and located at the northeastern periphery of Central Asia, created some of the first works of art in the Upper Paleolithic period, with objects such as the Venus figurines of Mal'ta. These figures consist most often of mammoth ivory. The figures are about 23,000 years old and stem from the Gravettian. Most of these statuettes show stylized clothes. Quite often the face is depicted. The tradition of Upper Paleolithic portable statuettes being almost exclusively European, it has been suggested that Mal'ta had some kind of cultural and cultic connection with Europe during that time period, but this remains unsettled.

== Bronze Age ==
The Bactria–Margiana Archaeological Complex (BMAC, also known as the "Oxus civilization") is the modern archaeological designation for a Bronze Age archaeological culture of Central Asia, dated to c. 2200–1700 BC, located in present-day eastern Turkmenistan, northern Afghanistan, southern Uzbekistan and western Tajikistan, centred on the upper Amu Darya (known to the ancient Greeks as the Oxus River), an area covering ancient Bactria. Its sites were discovered and named by the Soviet archaeologist Viktor Sarianidi (1976). Bactria was the Greek name for Old Persian Bāxtriš (from native *Bāxçiš) (named for its capital Bactra, modern Balkh), in what is now northern Afghanistan, and Margiana was the Greek name for the Persian satrapy of Margu, the capital of which was Merv, in today's Turkmenistan.

Fertility goddesses, named "Bactrian princesses", made from limestone, chlorite and clay reflect agrarian Bronze Age society, while the extensive corpus of metal objects point to a sophisticated tradition of metalworking. Wearing large stylised dresses, as well as headdresses that merge with the hair, "Bactrian princesses" embody the ranking goddess, character of the central Asian mythology that plays a regulatory role, pacifying the untamed forces.

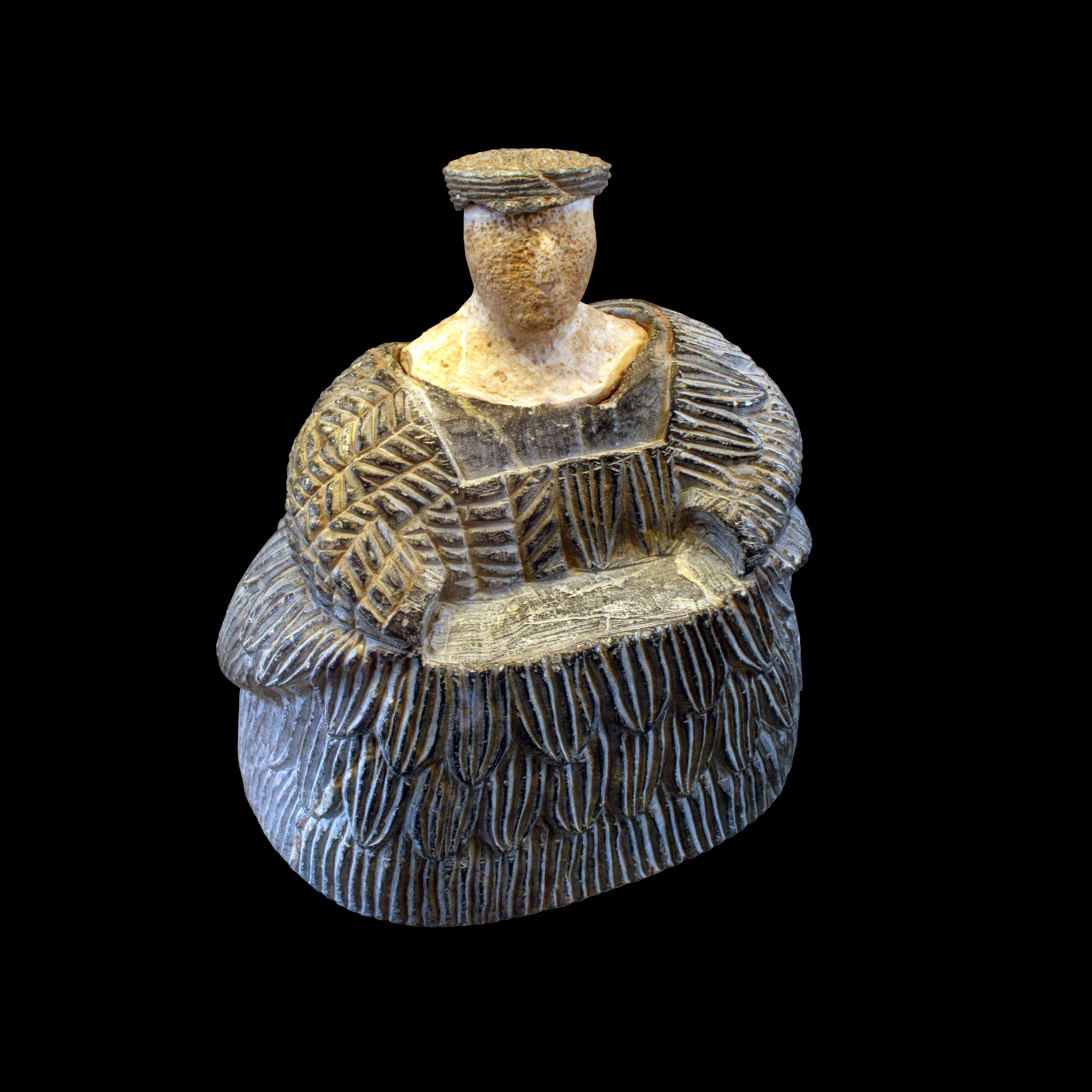
Female figurine of the "Bactrian princess" type; between 3rd millennium and 2nd millennium BC; chlorite mineral group (dress and headdresses) and limestone (face and neck); height: 17.3 cm, width: 16.1 cm; Louvre

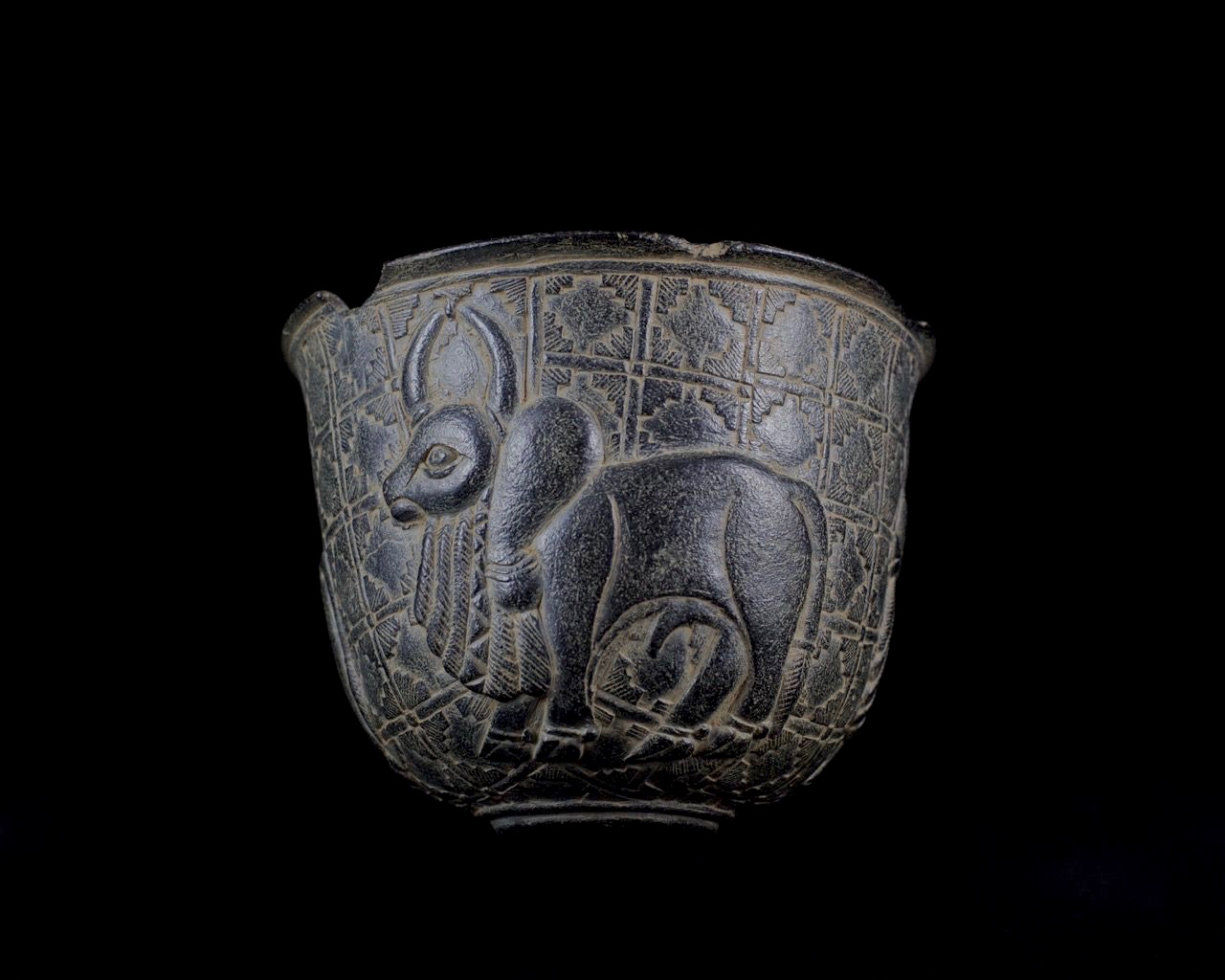
Ancient bowl with animals, Bactria, 3rd–2nd millennium BC.

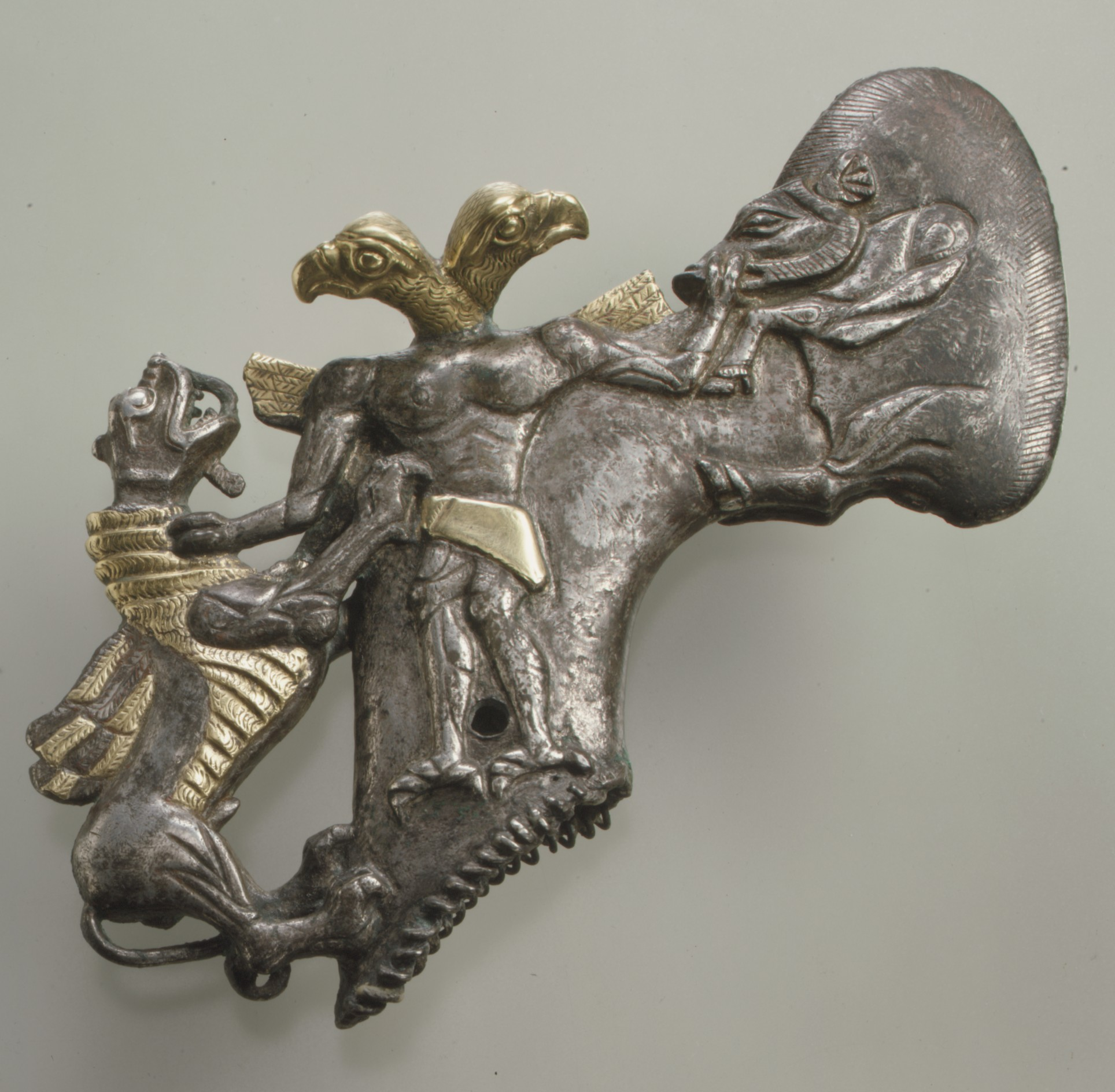
Axe with eagle-headed demon and animals; late 3rd millennium-early 2nd millennium BC; gilt silver; length: 15 cm; Metropolitan Museum of Art (New York City)

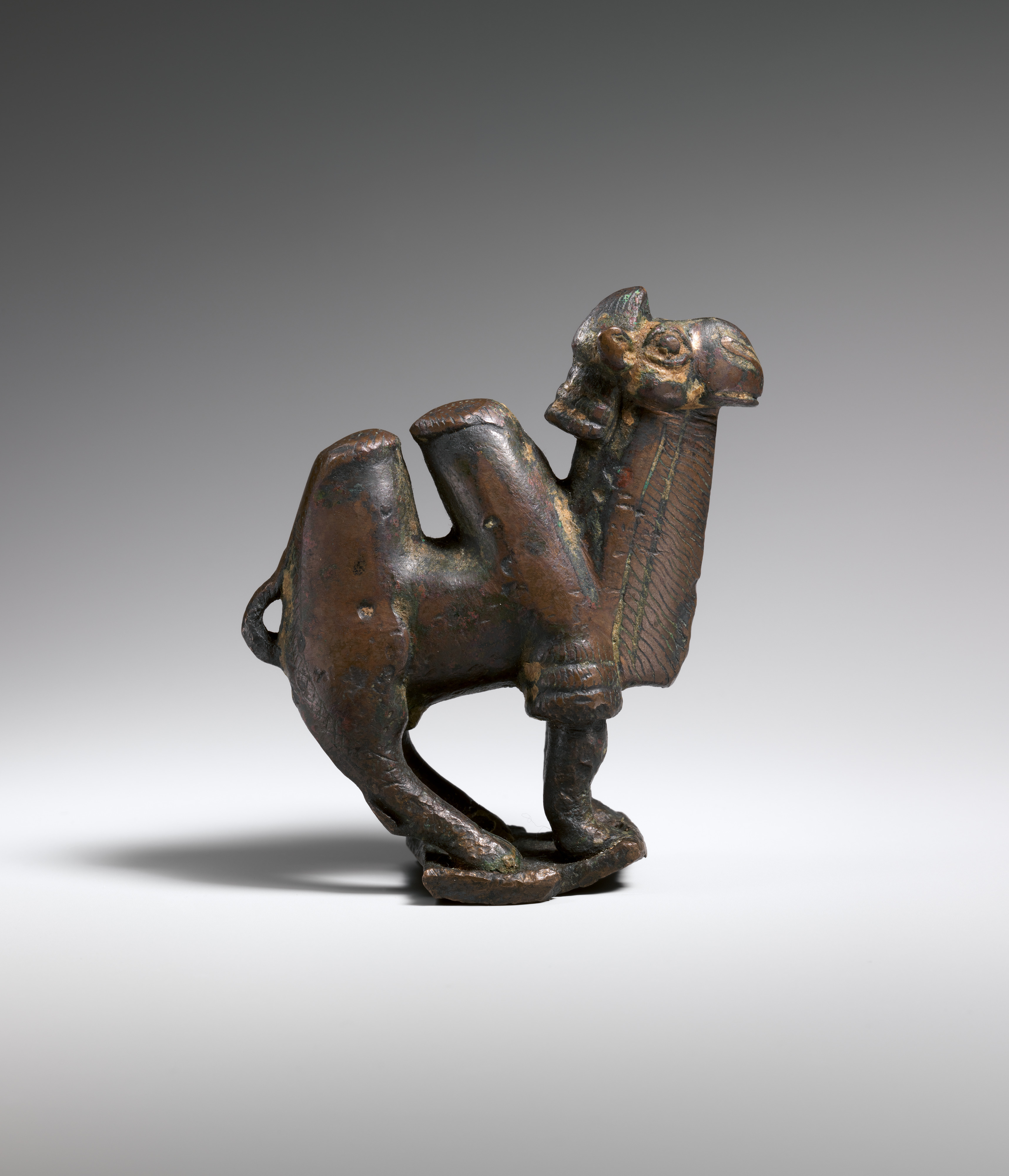
Camel figurine; late 3rd–early 2nd millennium BC; copper alloy; 8.89 cm; Metropolitan Museum of Art

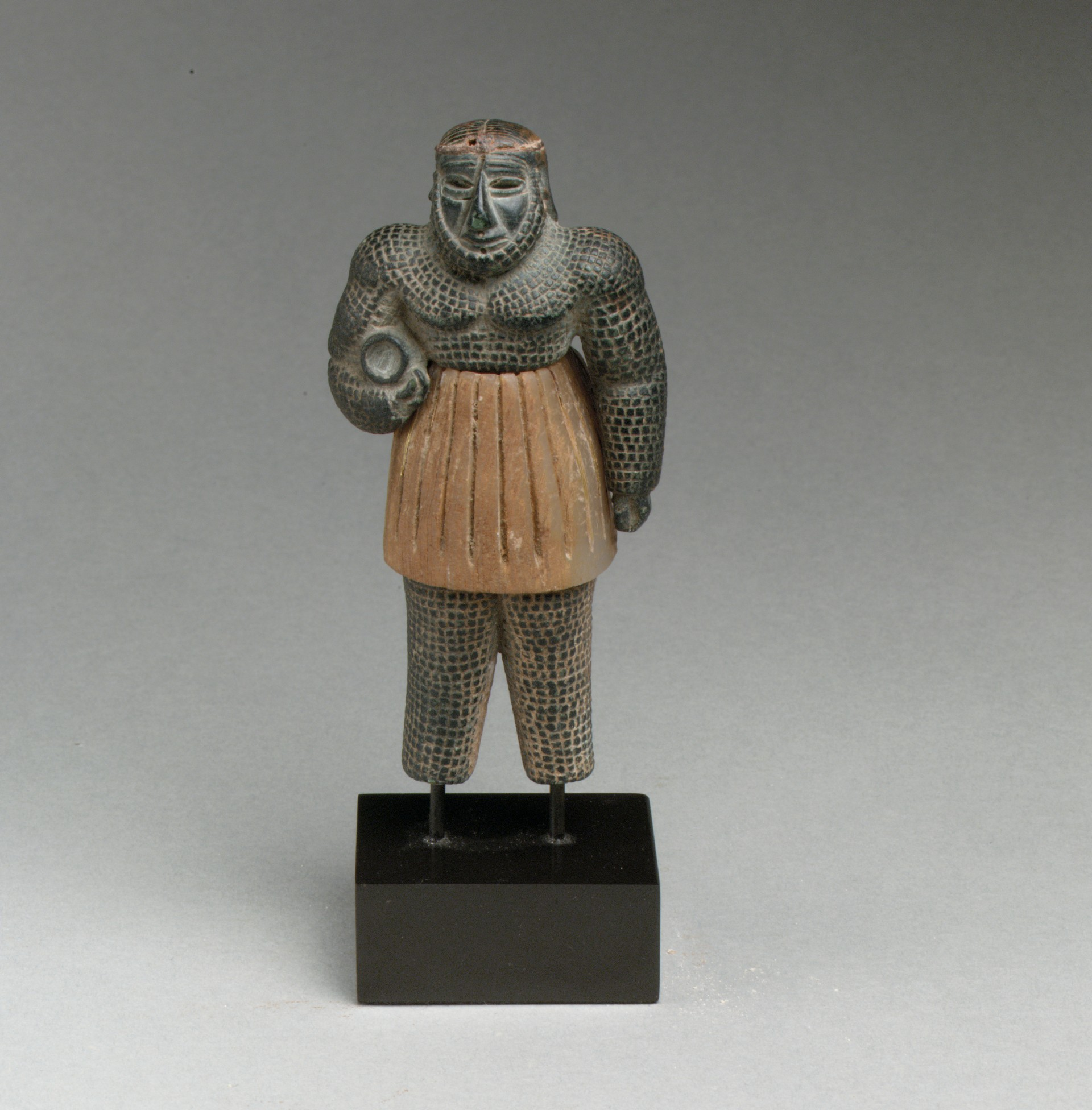
Monstrous male figure; late 3rd–early 2nd millennium BC; chlorite, calcite, gold and iron; height: 10.1 cm; Metropolitan Museum of Art

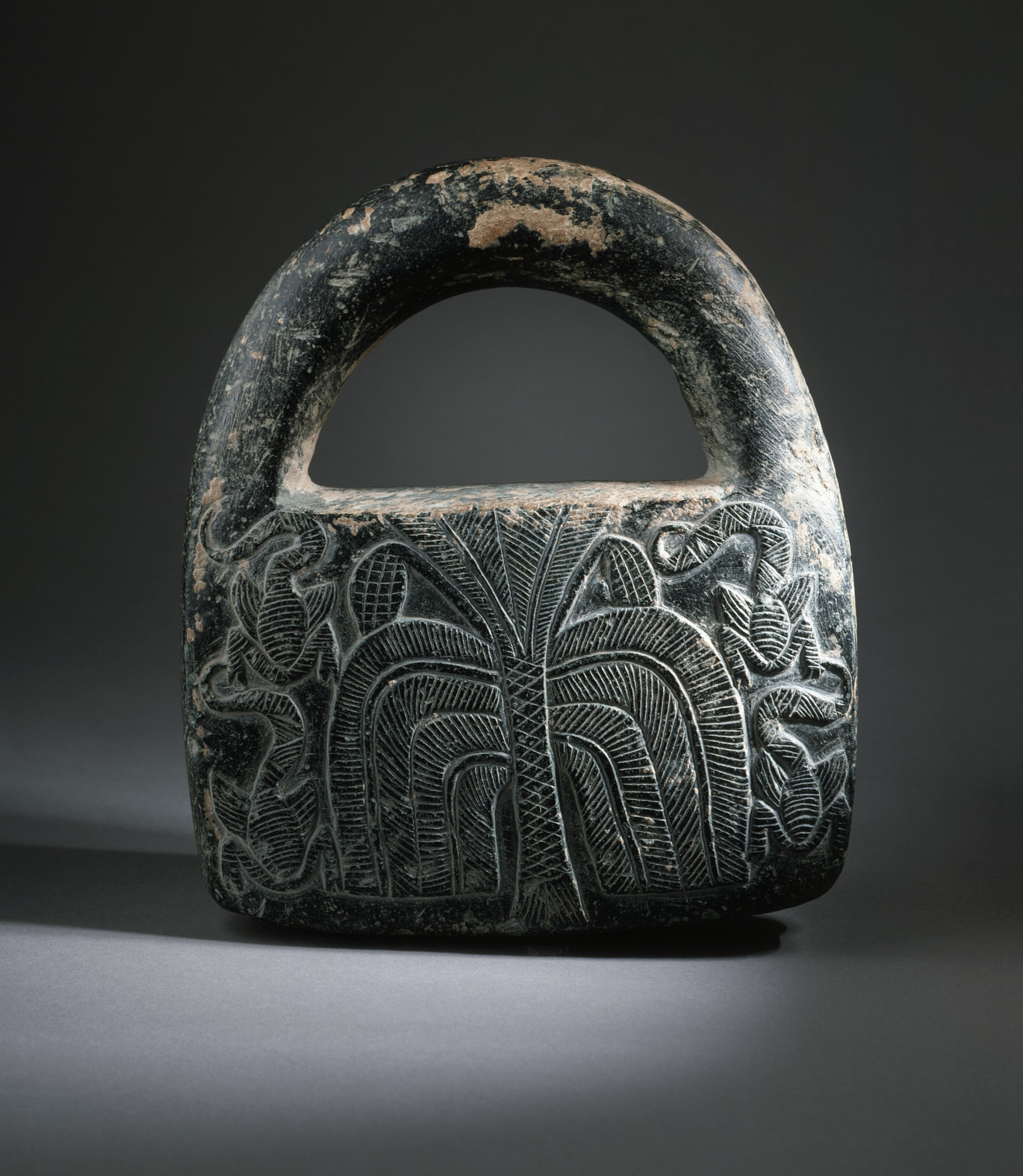
Handled weight; late 3rd–early 2nd millennium BC; chlorite; 25.08 x 19.69 x 4.45 cm; Los Angeles County Museum of Art (USA)

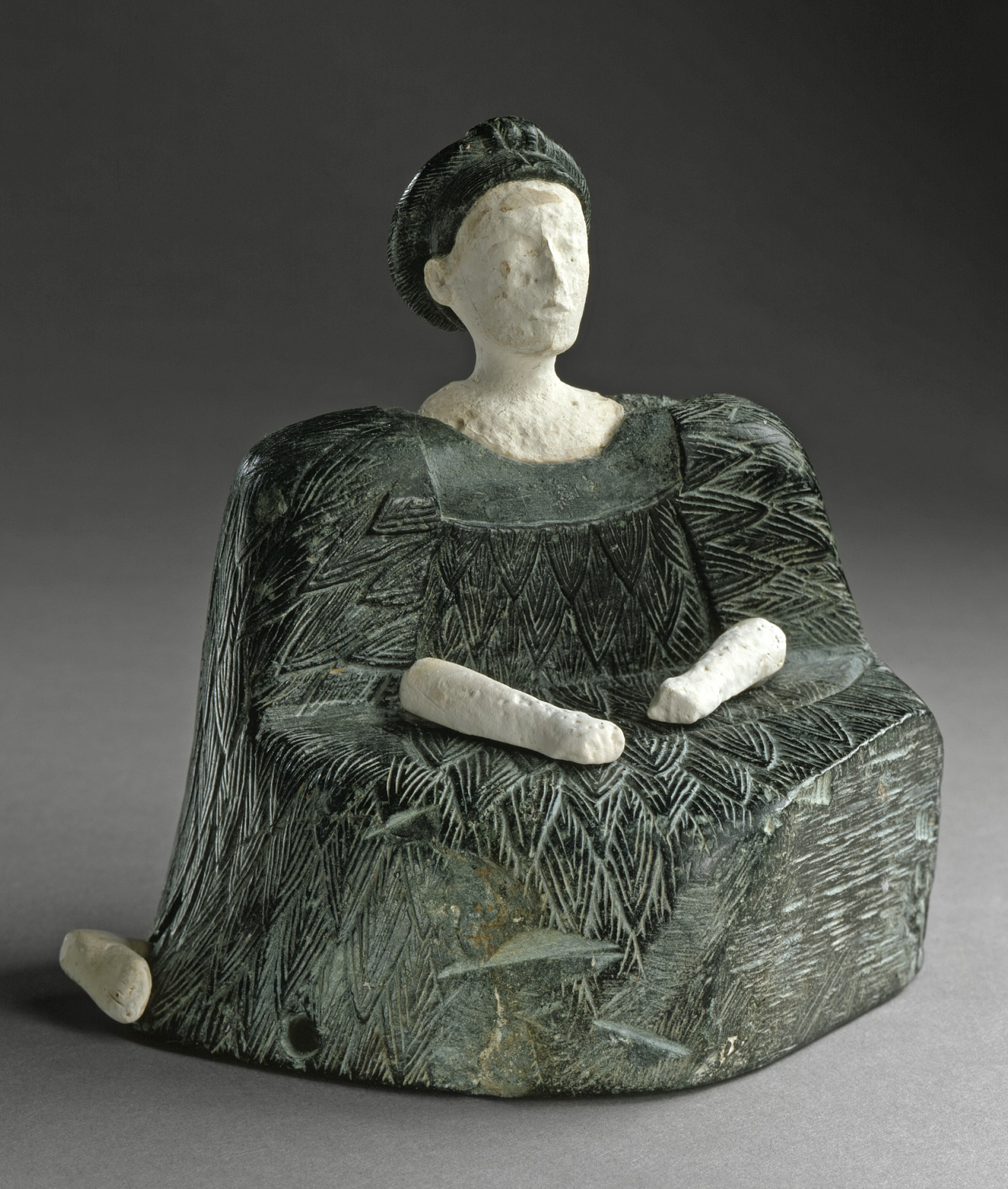
Female figurine of the "Bactrian princess" type; 2500–1500; chlorite (dress and headdresses) and limestone (head, hands and a leg); height: 13.33 cm; Los Angeles County Museum of Art (USA)

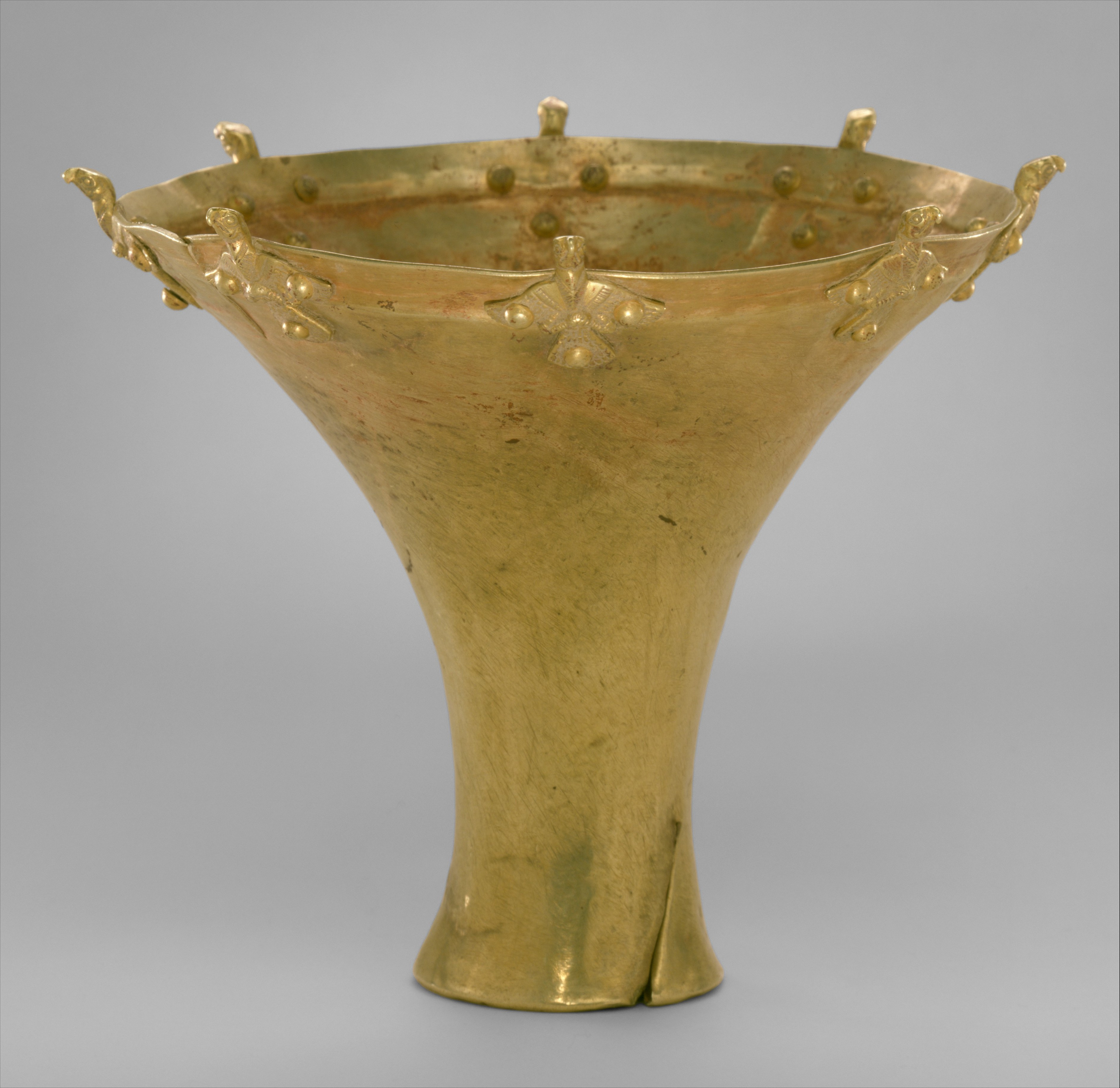
Beaker with birds on the rim; late 3rd–early 2nd millennium BC; electrum; height: 12 cm, width: 13.3 cm, depth: 4.5 cm; Metropolitan Museum of Art

== Scythian cultures ==
=== Pazyrik culture (6th–3rd century BC) ===
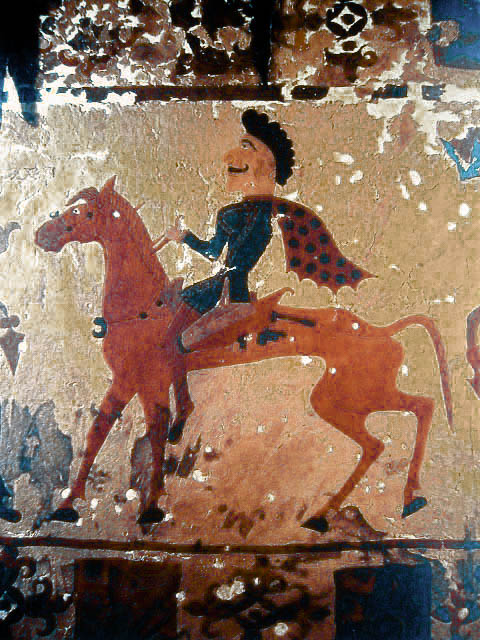
Horseman, Pazyryk felt artifact, c. 300 BC.

The Pazyryk culture is a Scythian nomadic Iron Age archaeological culture (of Iranian origin; c. 6th to 3rd centuries BC) identified by excavated artifacts and mummified humans found in the Siberian permafrost, in the Altay Mountains, Kazakhstan and nearby Mongolia. The mummies are buried in long barrows (or kurgans) similar to the tomb mounds of Scythian culture in Ukraine. The type site are the Pazyryk burials of the Ukok Plateau. Many artifacts and human remains have been found at this location, including the Siberian Ice Princess, indicating a flourishing culture at this location that benefited from the many trade routes and caravans of merchants passing through the area. The Pazyryk are considered to have had a war-like life.

Other kurgan cemeteries associated with the culture include those of Bashadar, Tuekta, Ulandryk, Polosmak and Berel. There are so far no known sites of settlements associated with the burials, suggesting a purely nomadic lifestyle.

The remarkable textiles recovered from the Pazyryk burials include the oldest woollen knotted-pile carpet known, the oldest embroidered Chinese silk, and two pieces of woven Persian fabric (State Hermitage Museum, St. Petersburg). Red and ochre predominate in the carpet, the main design of which is of riders, stags, and griffins. Many of the Pazyryk felt hangings, saddlecloths, and cushions were covered with elaborate designs executed in appliqué feltwork, dyed furs, and embroidery. Of exceptional interest are those with animal and human figural compositions, the most notable of which are the repeat design of an investiture scene on a felt hanging and that of a semi-human, semi-bird creature on another (both in the State Hermitage Museum, St. Petersburg). Clothing, whether of felt, leather, or fur, was also lavishly ornamented.

Horse reins either had animal designs cut out on them or were studded with wooden ones covered in gold foil. Their tail sheaths were ornamented, as were their headpieces and breast pieces. Some horses were provided with leather or felt masks made to resemble animals, with stag antlers or rams' horns often incorporated in them. Many of the trappings took the form of iron, bronze, and gilt wood animal motifs either applied or suspended from them; and bits had animal-shaped terminal ornaments. Altai-Sayan animals frequently display muscles delineated with dot and comma markings, a formal convention that may have derived from appliqué needlework. Such markings are sometimes included in Assyrian, Achaemenian, and even Urartian animal representations of the ancient Middle East. Roundels containing a dot serve the same purpose on the stag and other animal renderings executed by contemporary Śaka metalworkers. Animal processions of the Assyro-Achaemenian type also appealed to many Central Asian tribesmen and are featured in their arts.

Certain geometric designs and sun symbols, such as the circle and rosette, recur at Pazyryk but are completely outnumbered by animal motifs. The stag and its relatives figure as prominently as in Altai-Sayan. Combat scenes between carnivores and herbivores are exceedingly numerous in Pazyryk work; the Pazyryk beasts are locked in such bitter fights that the victim's hindquarters become inverted.

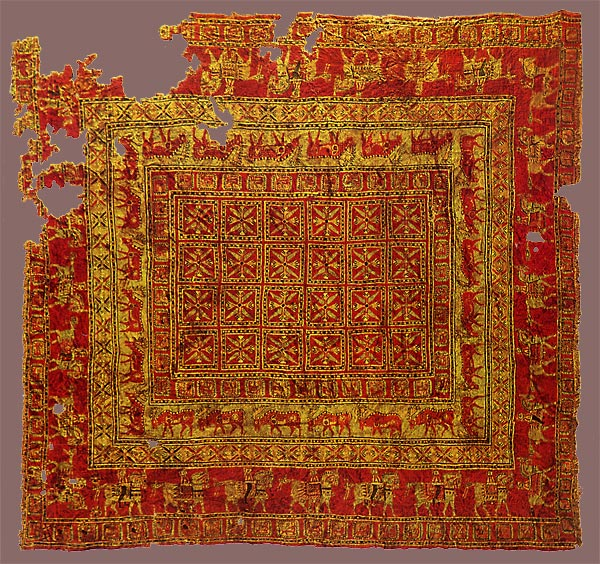
Pazyryk carpet

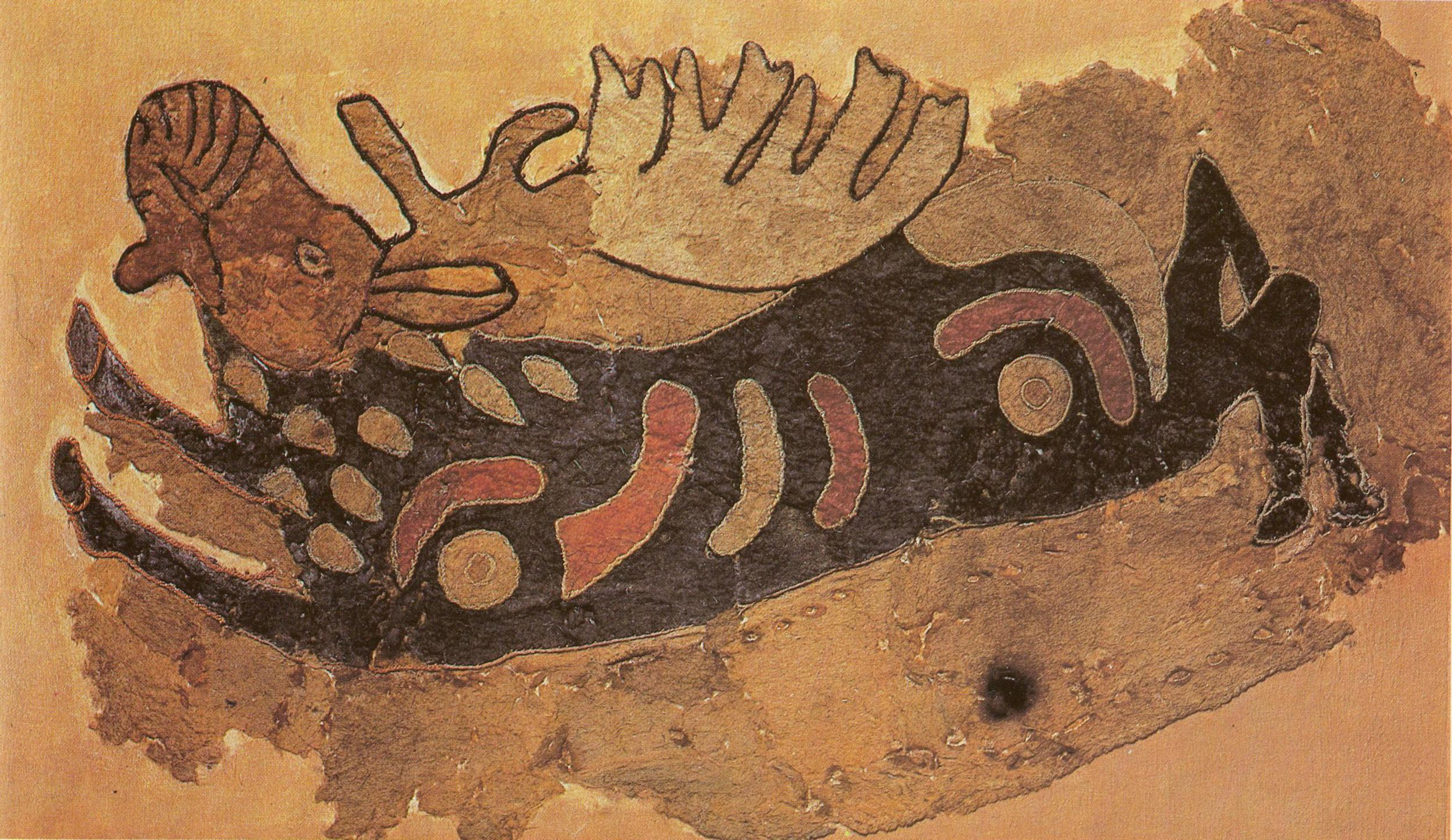
Pazyryk saddlecloth.

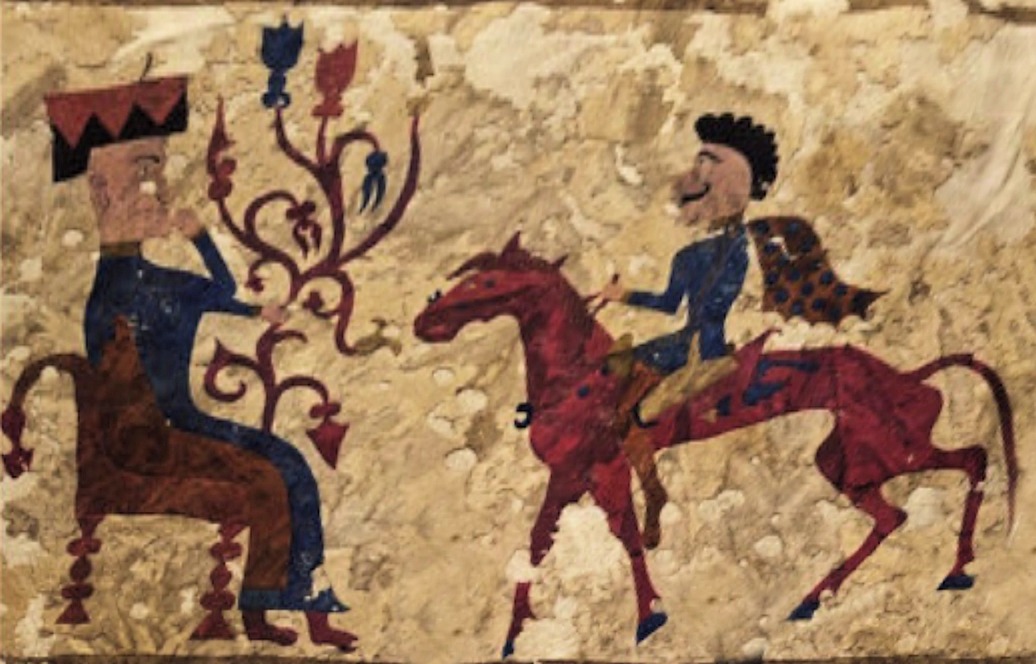
Decorated tapestry with seated goddess Tabiti and rider, Pazyryk Kurgan 5, Altai, Southern Russia c. 241 BC.

=== Art of the steppes ===
Tribes of Europoid type appear to have been active in Mongolia and Southern Siberia from ancient times. They were in contact with China and were often described for their foreign features.

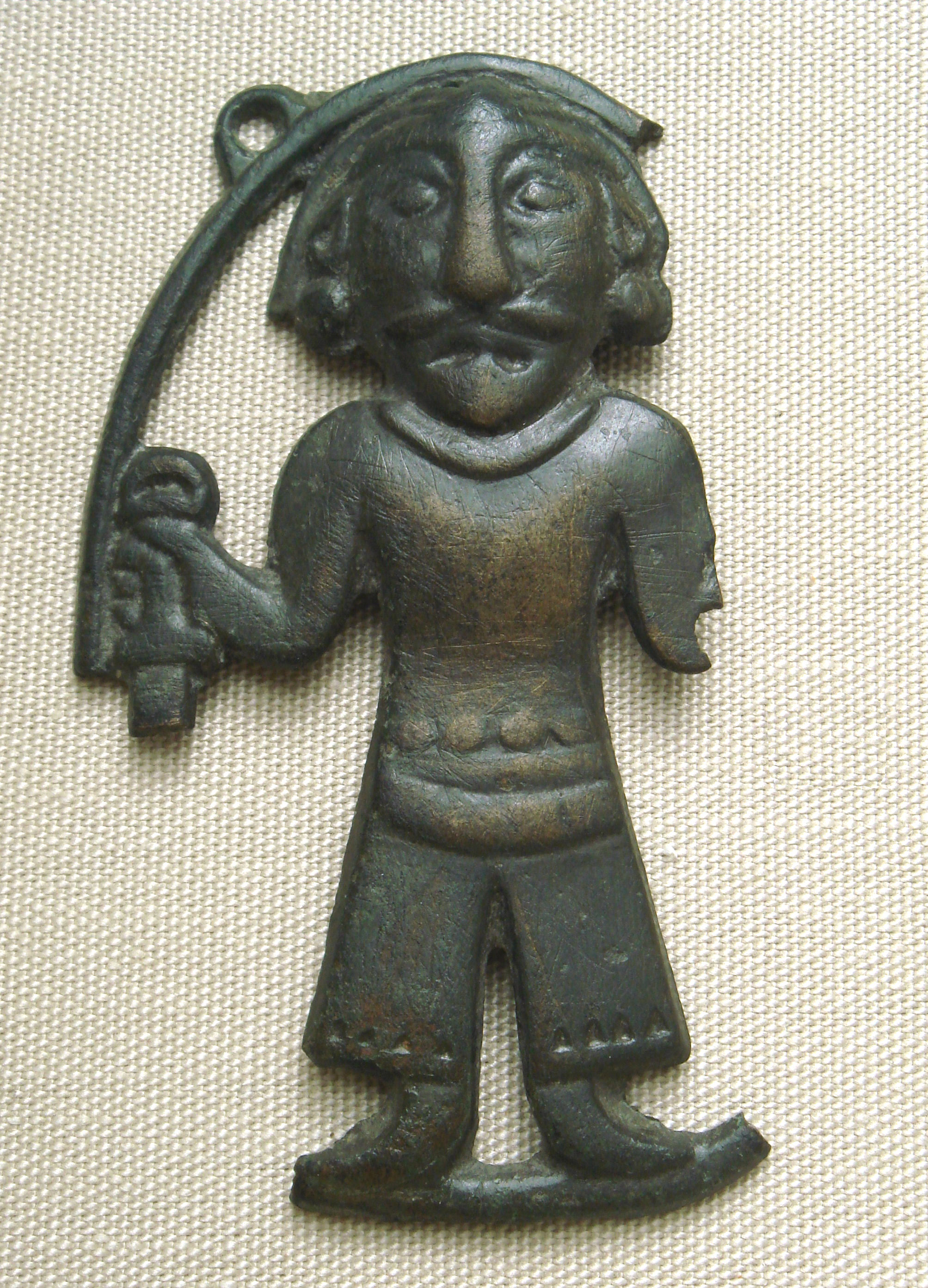
Bronze plaque of a man of the Ordos Plateau, later held by the Xiongnu. 3–1st century BC, British Museum. Otto Maenchen-Helfen notes that the statuette displays Caucasoid features.

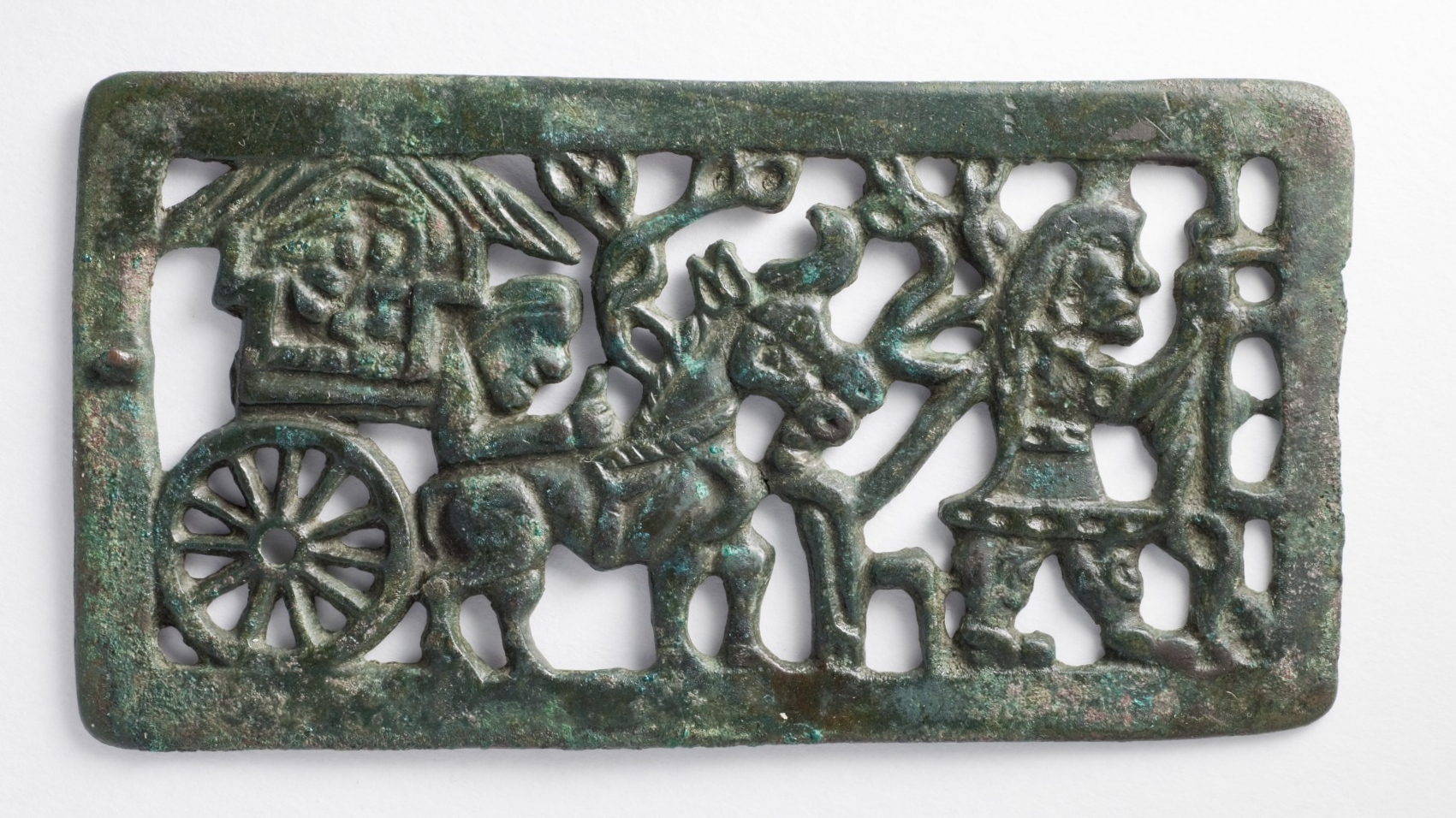
Belt buckle with Europoid types, Mongolia or southern Siberia, 2nd–1st century BC.

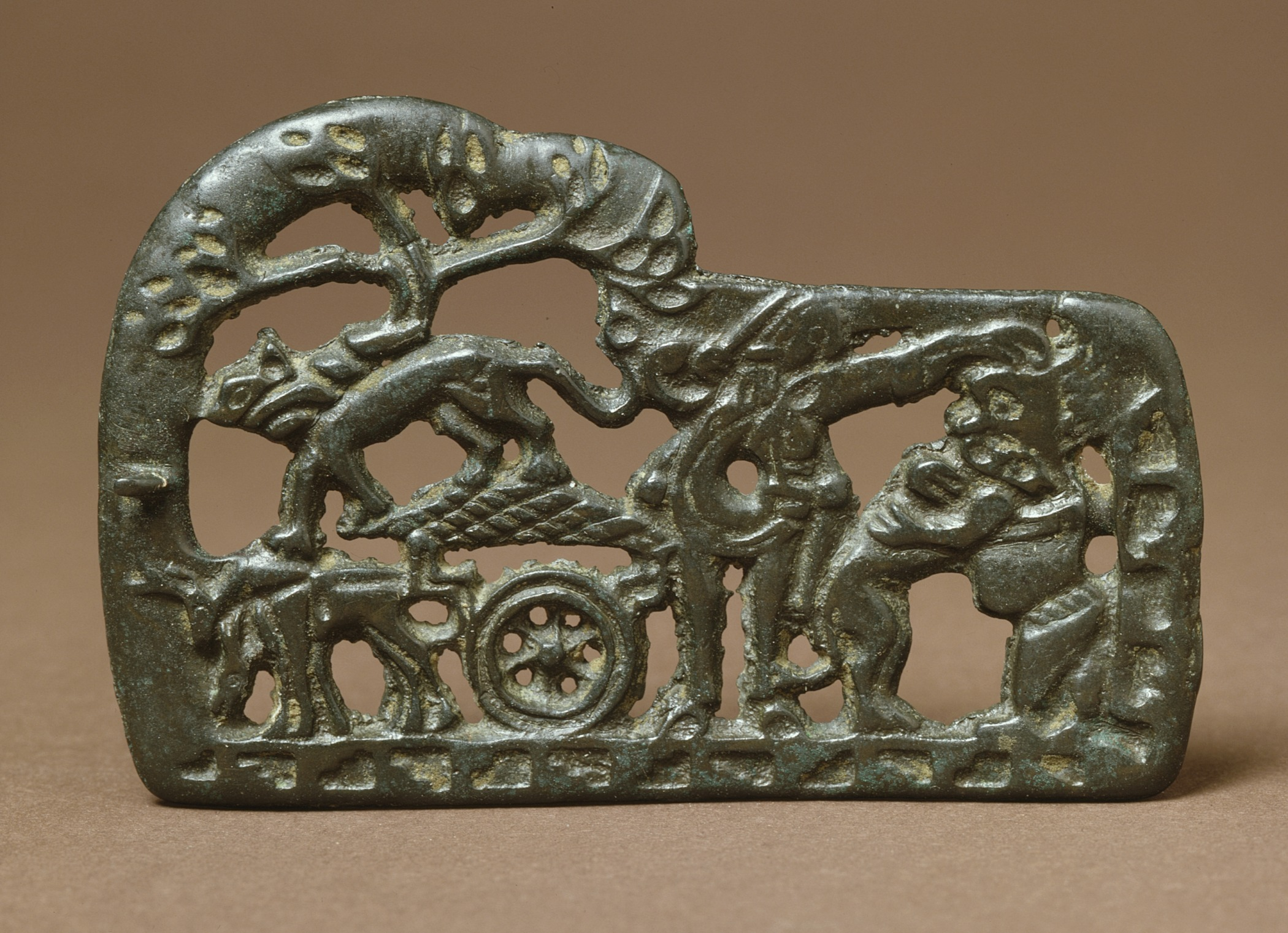
Belt Buckle, Mongolia or southern Siberia, 2nd–1st century BC.

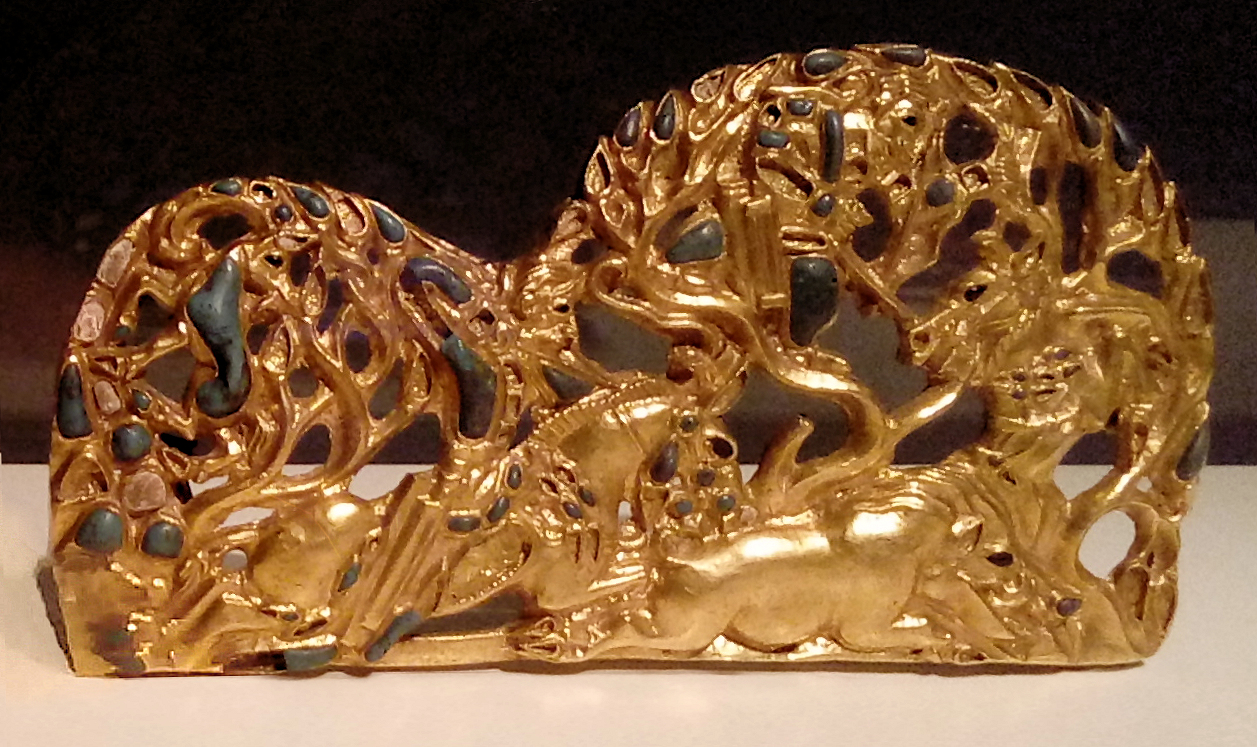
The Boar hunter, with characteristic Xiongnu horse trappings, Southern Siberia, 280–180 BC. Hermitage Museum.

=== Sakas ===
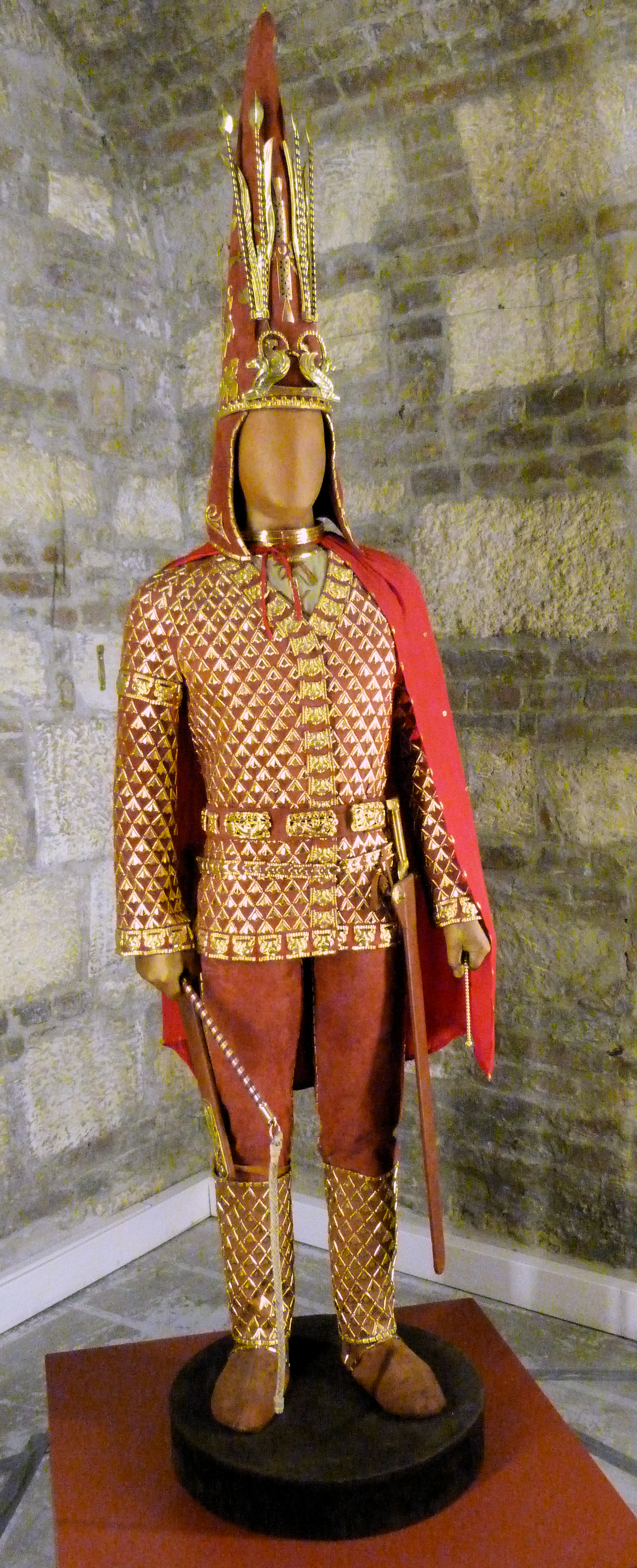
A cataphract-style parade armour of a Saka royal, also known as "The Golden Warrior", from the Issyk kurgan, a historical burial site near ex-capital city of Almaty, Kazakhstan. c. 400–200 BC.

The art of the Saka was of a similar styles as other Iranian peoples of the steppes, which is referred to collectively as Scythian art. In 2001, the discovery of an undisturbed royal Scythian burial-barrow illustrated Scythian animal-style gold that lacks the direct influence of Greek styles. Forty-four pounds of gold weighed down the royal couple in this burial, discovered near Kyzyl, capital of the Siberian republic of Tuva.

Ancient influences from Central Asia became identifiable in China following contacts of metropolitan China with nomadic western and northwestern border territories from the 8th century BC. The Chinese adopted the Scythian-style animal art of the steppes (descriptions of animals locked in combat), particularly the rectangular belt-plaques made of gold or bronze, and created their own versions in jade and steatite.

Following their expulsion by the Yuezhi, some Saka may also have migrated to the area of Yunnan in southern China. Saka warriors could also have served as mercenaries for the various kingdoms of ancient China. Excavations of the prehistoric art of the Dian civilisation of Yunnan have revealed hunting scenes of Caucasoid horsemen in Central Asian clothing.

Saka influences have been identified as far as Korea and Japan. Various Korean artifacts, such as the royal crowns of the kingdom of Silla, are said to be of "Scythian" design. Similar crowns, brought through contacts with the continent, can also be found in Kofun era Japan.

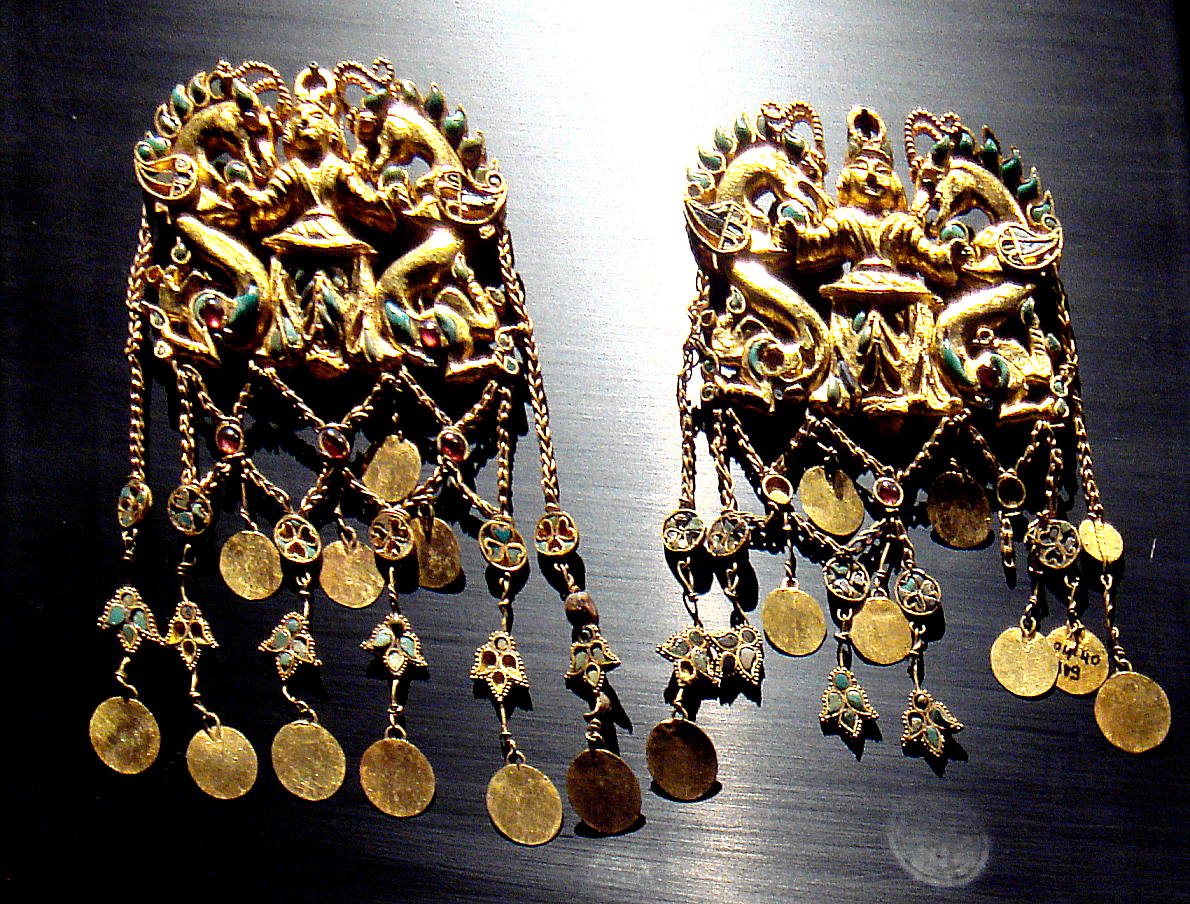
"Kings with dragons", Tillia Tepe

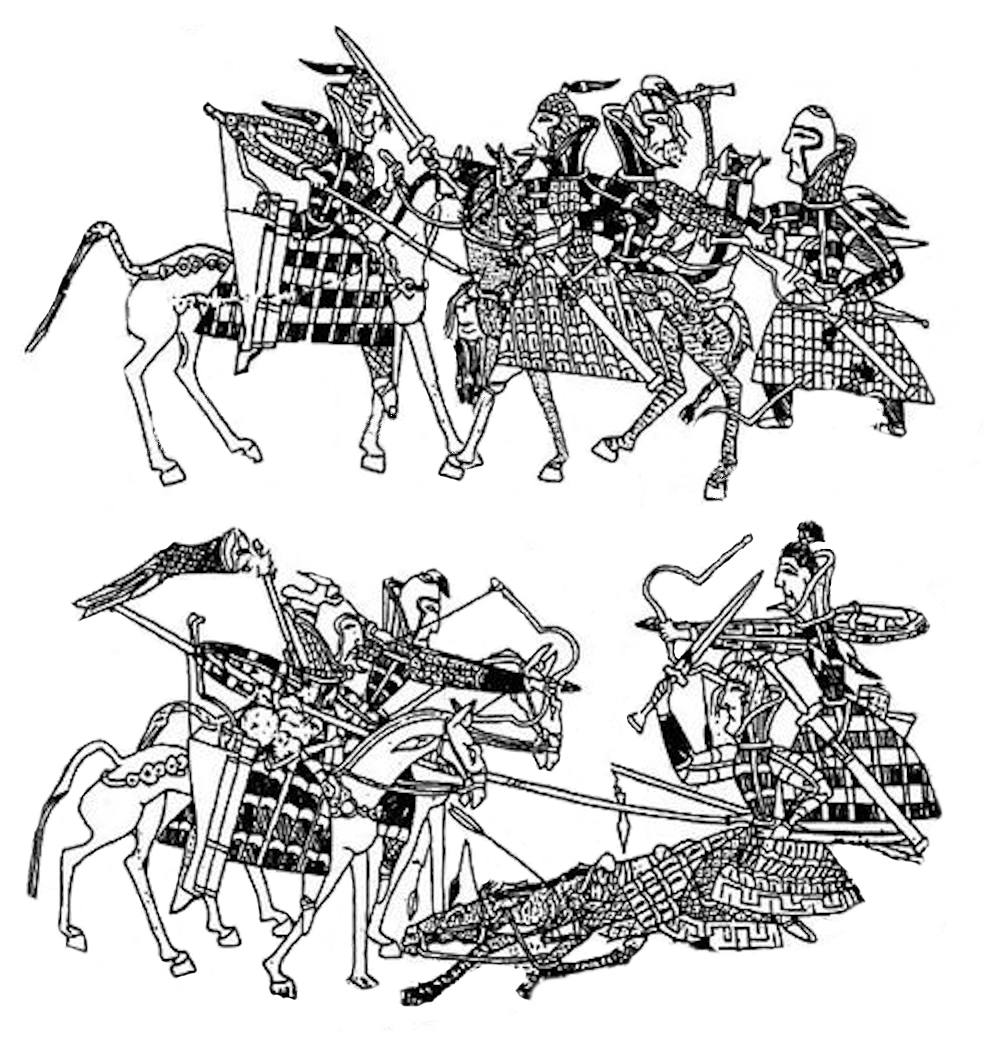
Battle scenes on the Orlat plaques. 1st century AD.

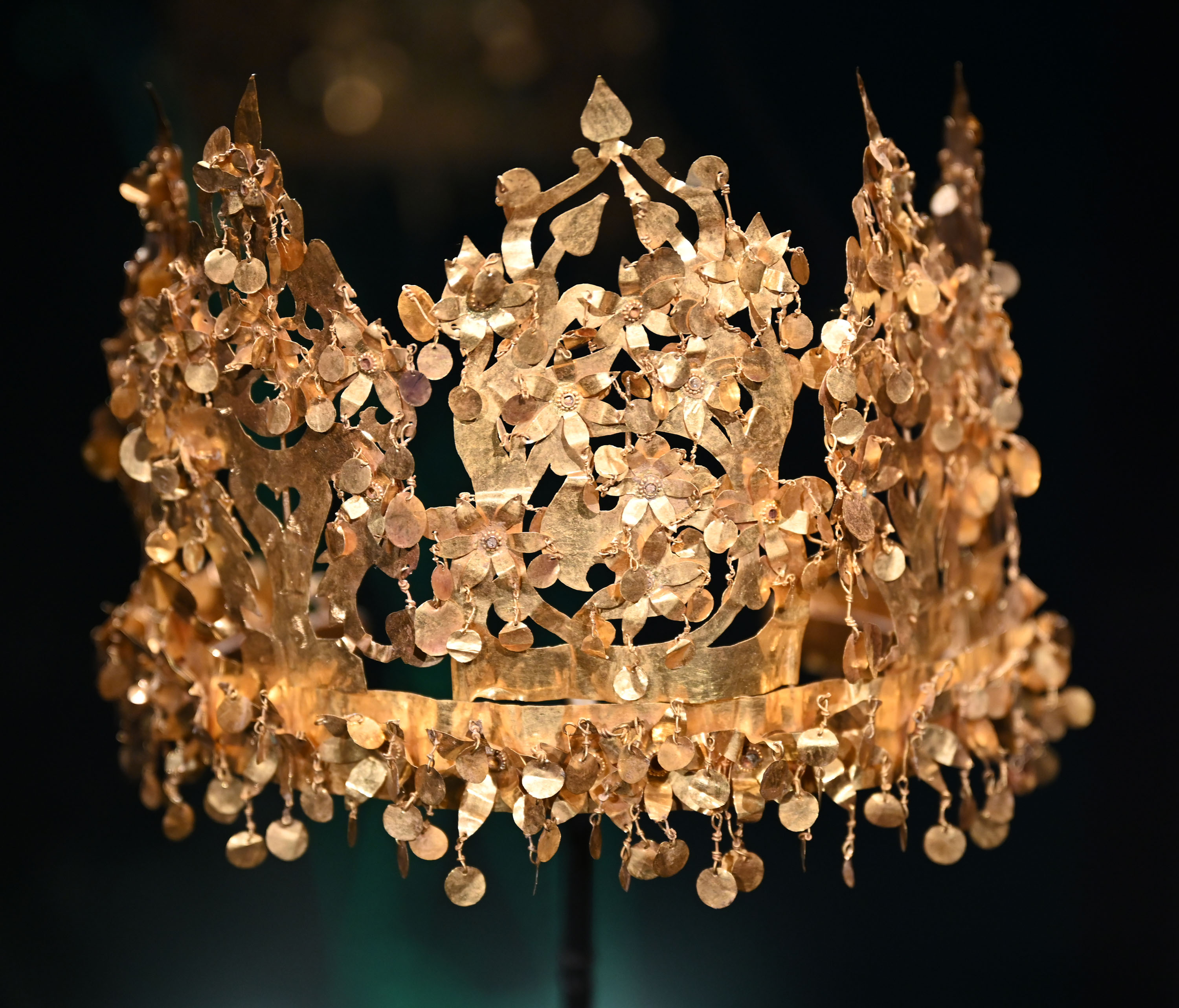
Crown from Tomb VI of Tillya Tepe (female owner)

== Achaemenid period ==
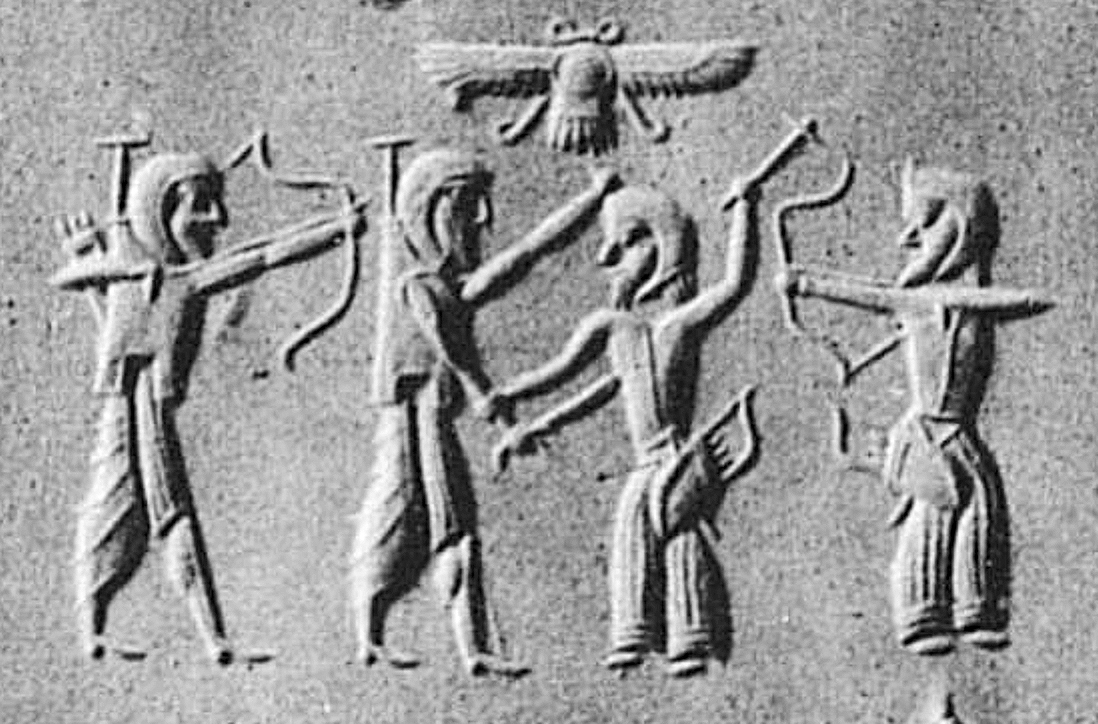
Persian soldiers (left) fighting against Scythians. Cylinder seal impression.

Margiana and Bactria belonged to the Medes for a time, and were then annexed to the Achaemenid Empire by Cyrus the Great in sixth century BC, forming the twelfth satrapy of Persia.

Under Persian rule, many Greeks were deported to Bactria, so that their communities and language became common in the area. During the reign of Darius I, the inhabitants of the Greek city of Barca, in Cyrenaica, were deported to Bactria for refusing to surrender assassins. In addition, Xerxes also settled the "Branchidae" in Bactria; they were the descendants of Greek priests who had once lived near Didyma (western Asia Minor) and betrayed the temple to him. Herodotus also records a Persian commander threatening to enslave daughters of the revolting Ionians and send them to Bactria. Persia subsequently conscripted Greek men from these settlements in Bactria into their military, as did Alexander later.

== Hellenistic and Greco-Bactrian art (265–145 BC) ==
The Greco-Bactrians ruled the southern part of Central Asia from the 3rd to the 2nd century BC, with their capital at Ai-Khanoum.

The main known remains from this period are the ruins and artifacts of their city of Ai-Khanoum, a Greco-Bactrian city founded circa 280 BC which continued to flourish during the first 55 years of the Indo-Greek period until its destruction by nomadic invaders in 145 BC, and their coinage, which is often bilingual, combining Greek with the Indian Brahmi script or Kharoshthi. Apart from Ai-Khanoum, Indo-Greek ruins have been positively identified in few cities such as Barikot or Taxila, with generally much fewer known artistic remains.

=== Architecture in Bactria ===
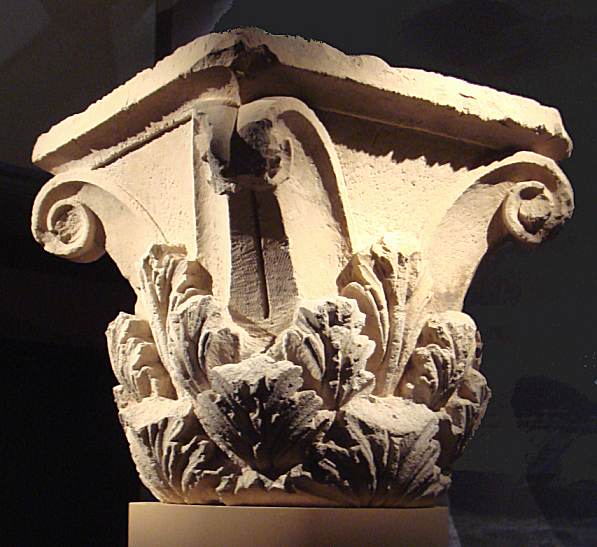
Corinthian capital, found at Ai-Khanoum in the citadel by the troops of Commander Massoud, 2nd century BC.

Numerous artefacts and structures were found, particularly in Ai-Khanoum, pointing to a high Hellenistic culture, combined with Eastern influences, starting from the 280–250 BC period. Overall, Aï-Khanoum was an extremely important Greek city (1.5 sq kilometer), characteristic of the Seleucid Empire and then the Greco-Bactrian Kingdom, remaining one of the major cities at the time when the Greek kings started to occupy parts of India, from 200 to 145 BC. It seems the city was destroyed, never to be rebuilt, about the time of the death of king Eucratides around 145 BC.

Archaeological missions unearthed various structures, some of them perfectly Hellenistic, some other integrating elements of Persian architecture, including a citadel, a Classical theater, a huge palace in Greco-Bactrian architecture, somehow reminiscent of formal Persian palatial architecture, a gymnasium (100 × 100m), one of the largest of Antiquity, various temples, a mosaic representing the Macedonian sun, acanthus leaves and various animals (crabs, dolphins etc...), numerous remains of Classical Corinthian columns. Many artifacts are dated to the 2nd century BC, which corresponds to the early Indo-Greek period.

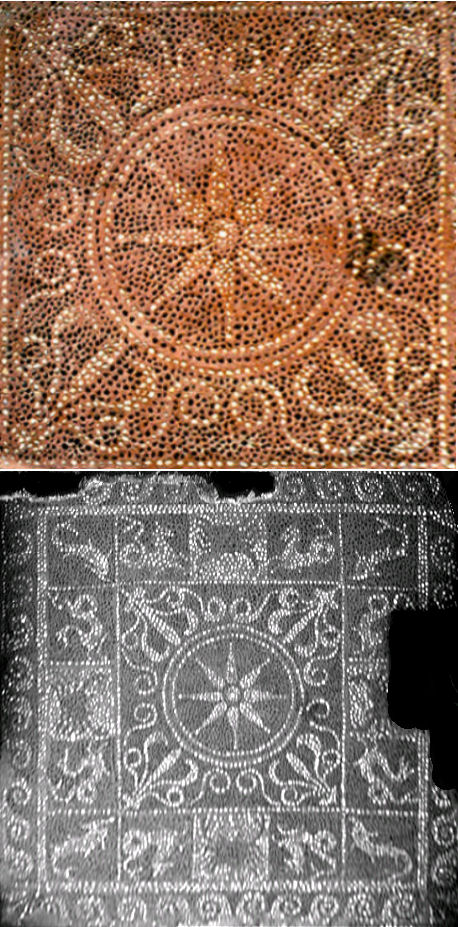
Ai- Khanoum mosaic (central detail in color).

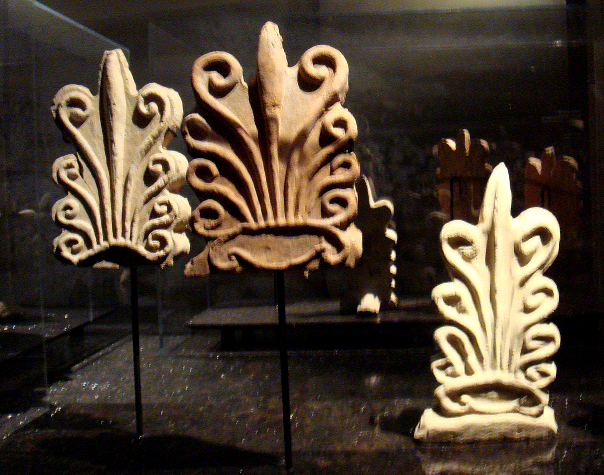
Architectural antefixae with Hellenistic "Flame palmette" design, Ai-Khanoum.

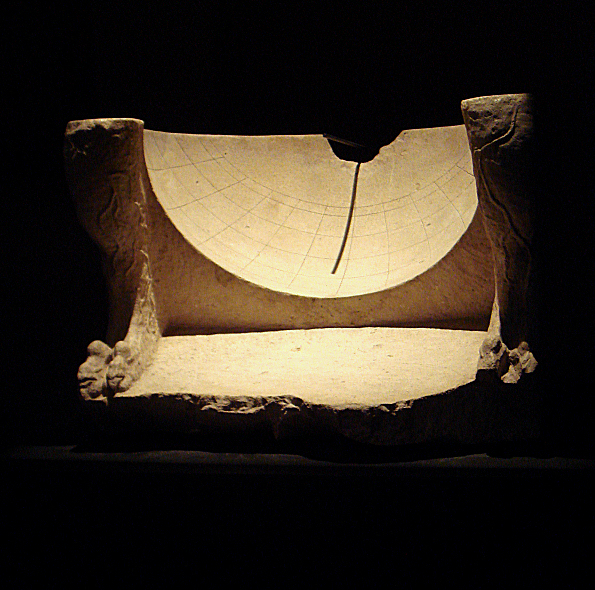
Sun dial within two sculpted lion feet.

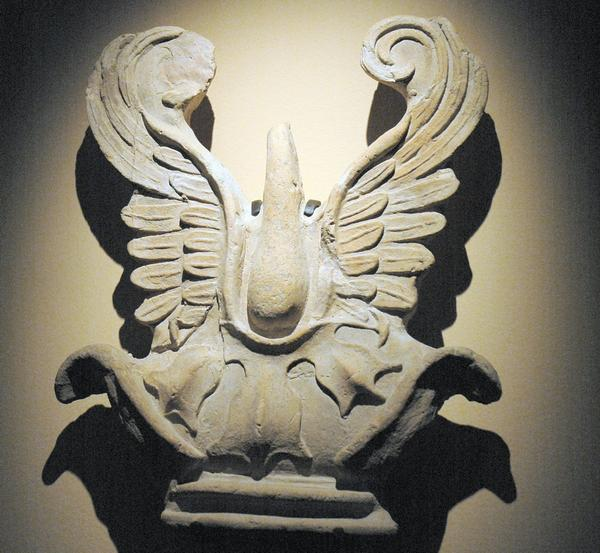
Winged antefix, a type only known from Ai-Khanoum.

=== Sculpture ===
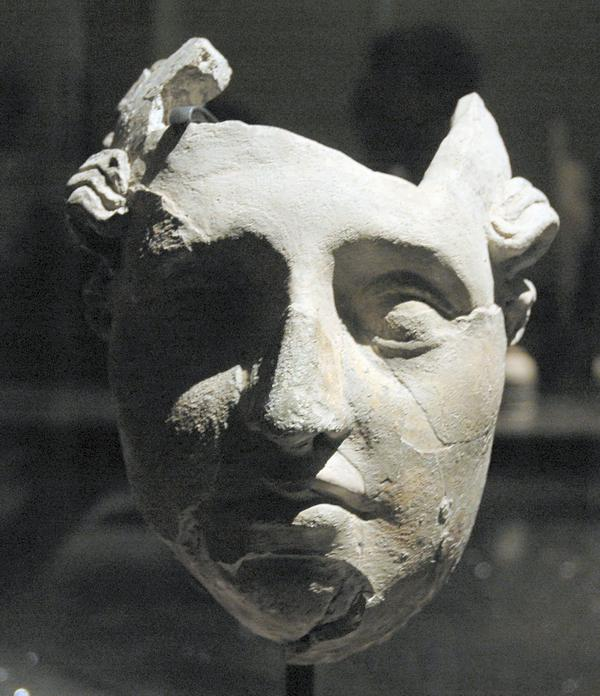
Stucco face found in the administrative palace. Ai-Khanoum, 2nd century BC

Various sculptural fragments were also found at Ai-Khanoum, in a rather conventional, classical style, rather impervious to the Hellenizing innovations occurring at the same time in the Mediterranean world. Of special notice, a huge foot fragment in excellent Hellenistic style was recovered, which is estimated to have belonged to a 5–6 meter tall statue (which had to be seated to fit within the height of the columns supporting the Temple). Since the sandal of the foot fragment bears the symbolic depiction of Zeus' thunderbolt, the statue is thought to have been a smaller version of the Statue of Zeus at Olympia.

Due to the lack of proper stones for sculptural work in the area of Ai-Khanoum, unbaked clay and stucco modeled on a wooden frame were often used, a technique which would become widespread in Central Asia and the East, especially in Buddhist art. In some cases, only the hands and feet would be made in marble.

In India, only a few Hellenistic sculptural remains have been found, mainly small items in the excavations of Sirkap.

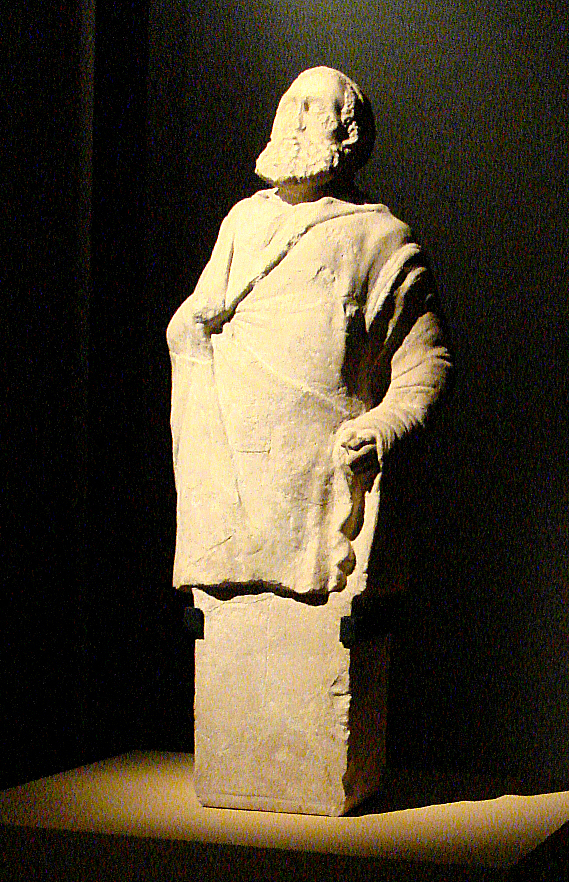
Sculpture of an old man. Ai-Khanoum, 2nd century BC.

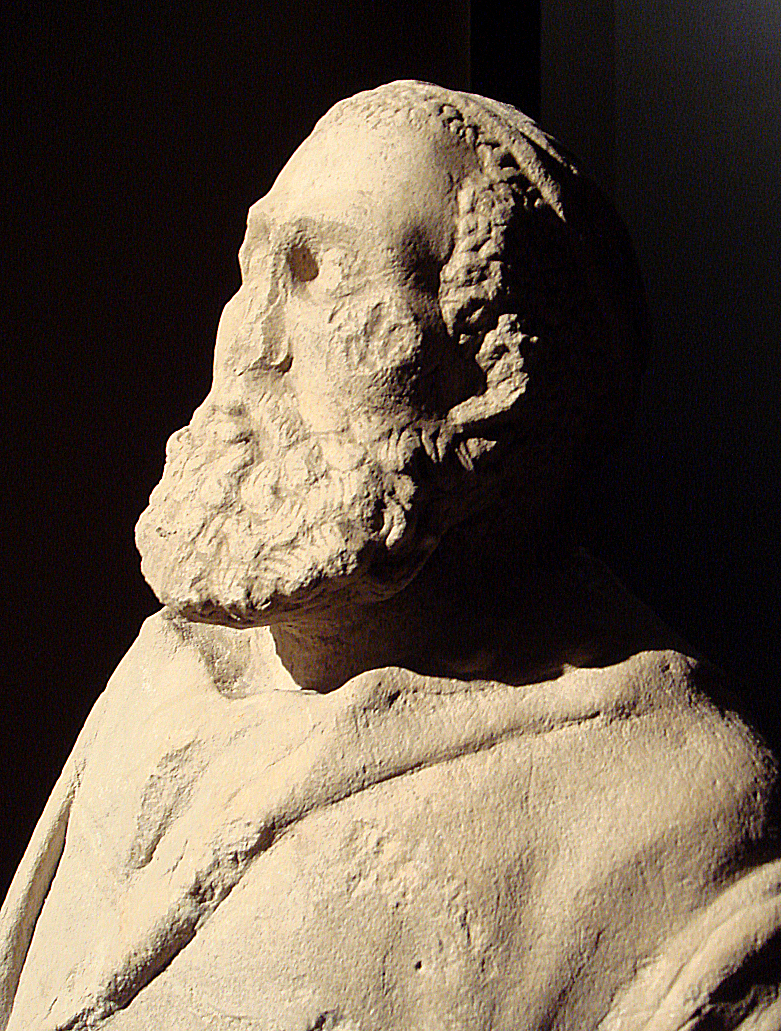
Close-up of the same statue.

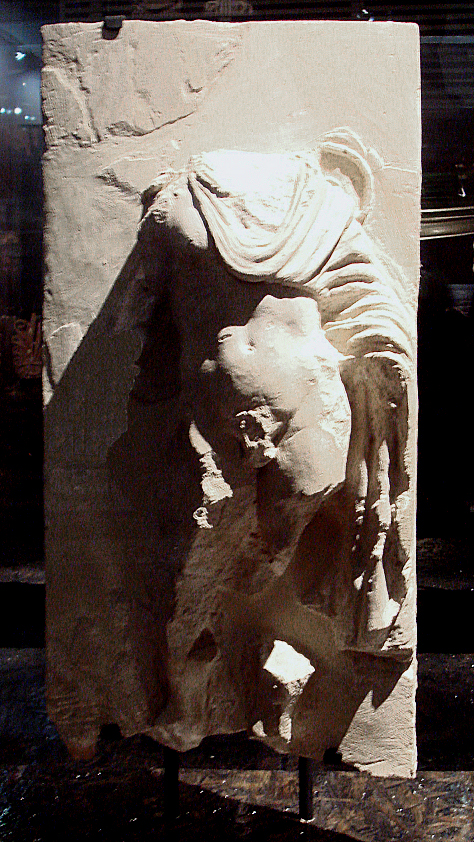
Frieze of a naked man wearing a chlamys. Ai-Khanoum, 2nd century BC.

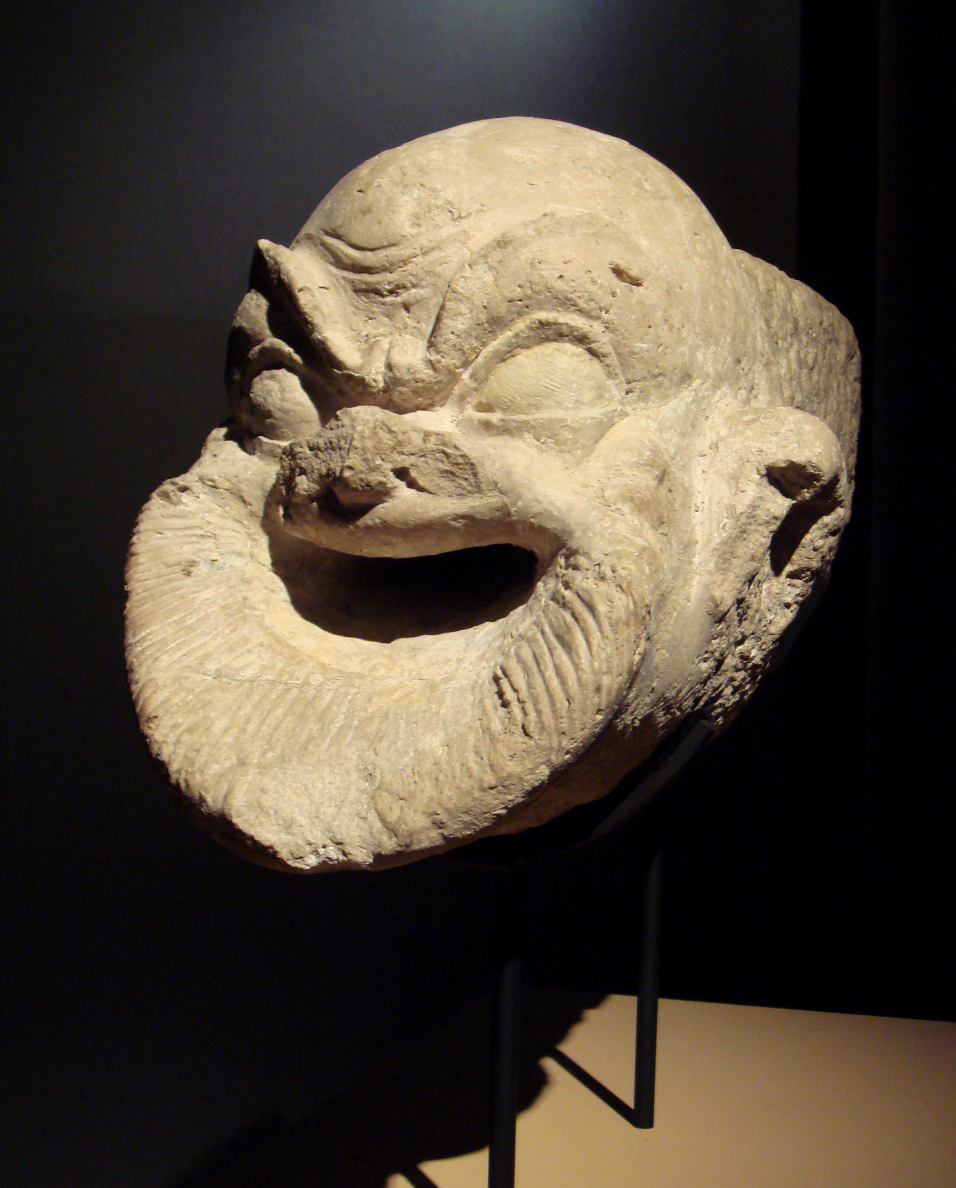
Hellenistic gargoyle. Ai-Khanoum, 2nd century BC.

=== Artefacts ===
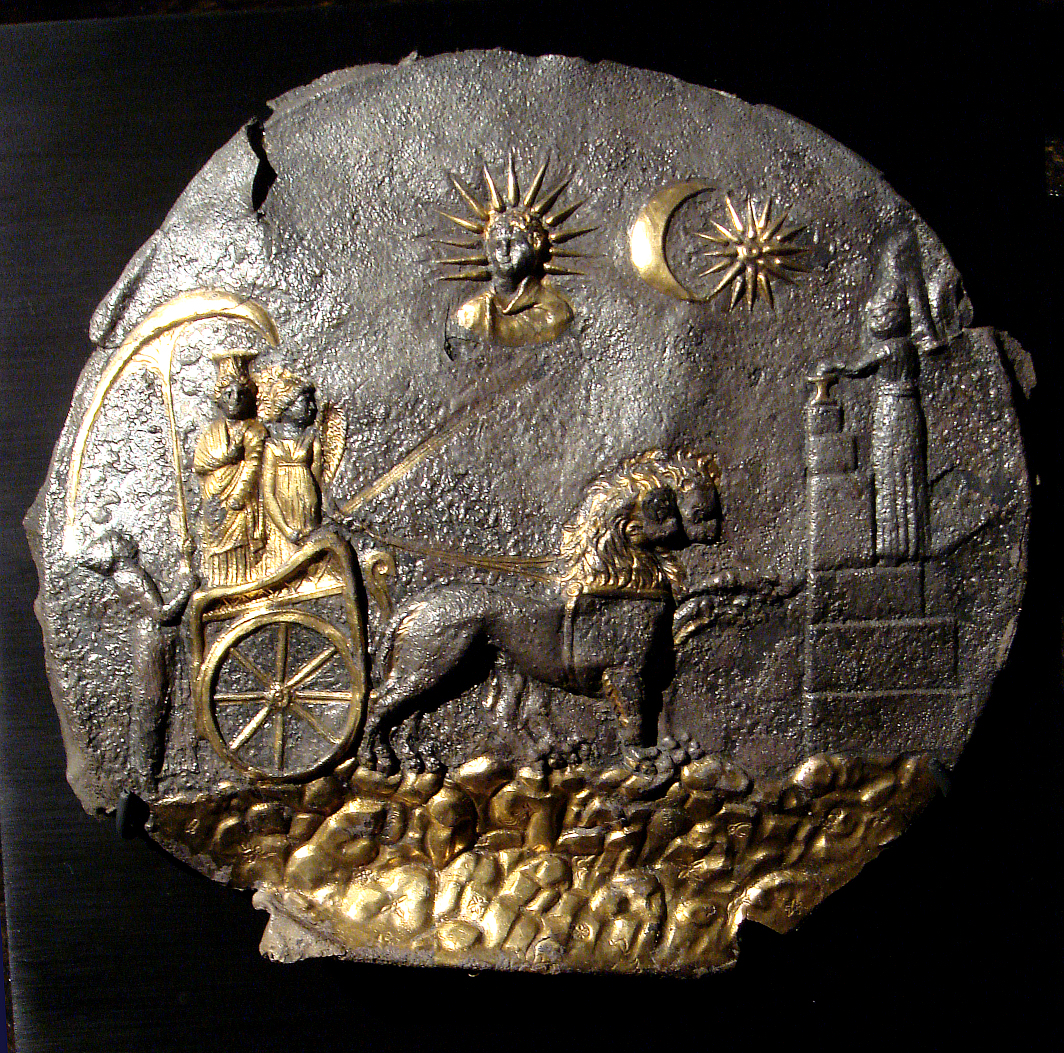
Plate depicting Cybele pulled by lions, a votive sacrifice and the Sun God. Ai-Khanoum, 2nd century BC.

A variety of artefacts of Hellenistic style, often with Persian influence, were also excavated at Ai-Khanoum, such as a round medallion plate describing the goddess Cybele on a chariot, in front of a fire altar, and under a depiction of Helios, a fully preserved bronze statue of Herakles, various golden serpentine arm jewellery and earrings, a toilet tray representing a seated Aphrodite, a mold representing a bearded and diademed middle-aged man. Various artefacts of daily life are also clearly Hellenistic: sundials, ink wells, tableware. An almost life-sized dark green glass phallus with a small owl on the back side and other treasures are said to have been discovered at Ai-Khanoum, possibly along with a stone with an inscription, which was not recovered. The artefacts have now been returned to the Kabul Museum after several years in Switzerland by Paul Bucherer-Dietschi, Director of the Swiss Afghanistan Institute.

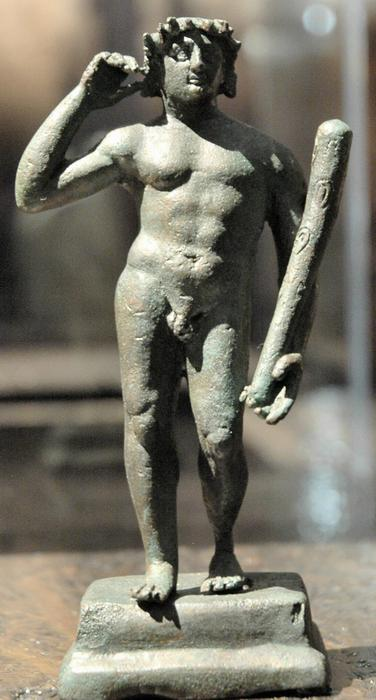
Bronze Herakles statuette. Ai-Khanoum. 2nd century BC.

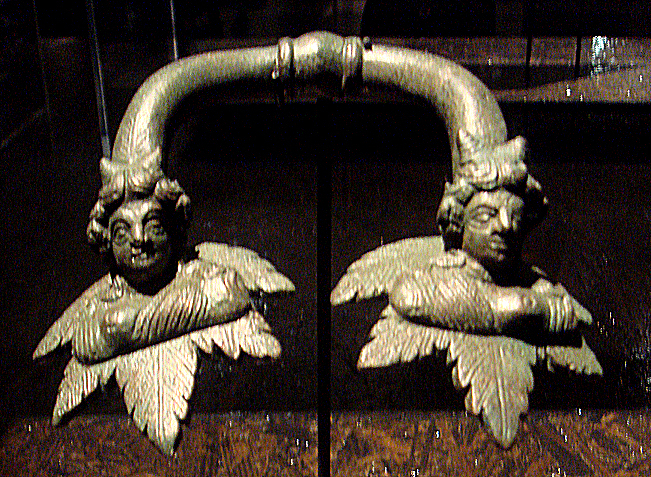
Bracelet with horned female busts. Ai-Khanoum, 2nd century BC.

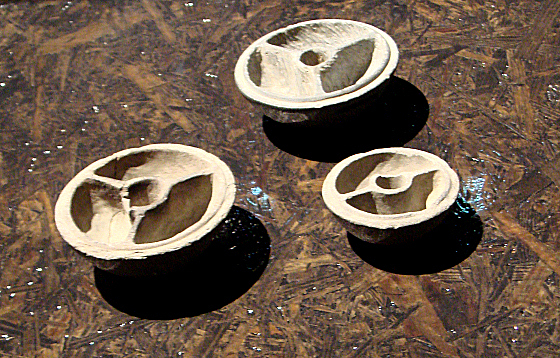
Stone recipients from Ai-Khanoum. 3rd-2nd century BC.

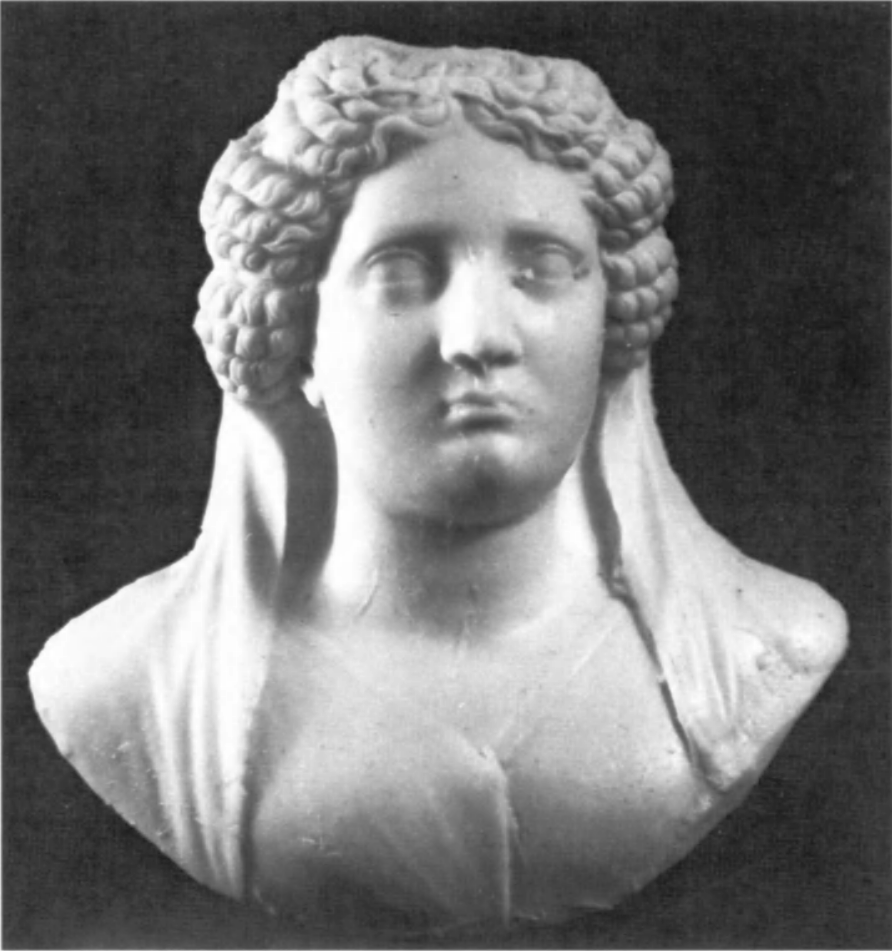
Imprint from a mold found in Ai-Khanoum. 3rd-2nd century BC.

== Yuezhi and Kushan art ==
Some traces remain of the presence of the Kushans in the areas of Bactria and Sogdiana. Archaeological structures are known in Takht-I-Sangin, Surkh Kotal (a monumental temple), and in the palace of Khalchayan. Various sculptures and friezes are known, representing horse-riding archers, and, significantly, men with artificially deformed skulls, such as the Kushan prince of Khalchayan (a practice well attested in nomadic Central Asia).

=== Khalchayan (1st century BC) ===
Kushan art at Khalchayan
(1st century BC)

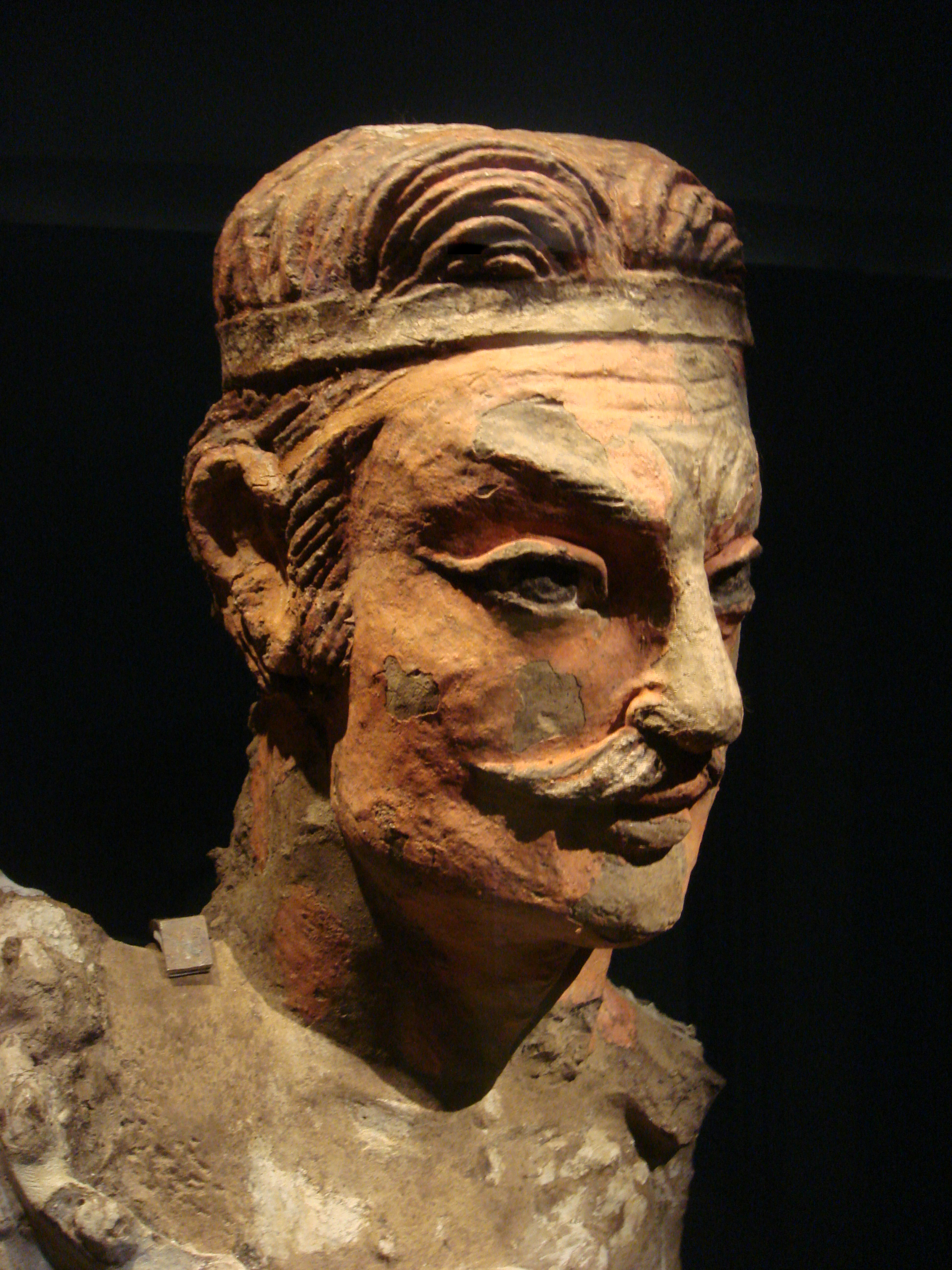
Head of a Yuezhi prince (Khalchayan palace, Uzbekistan).

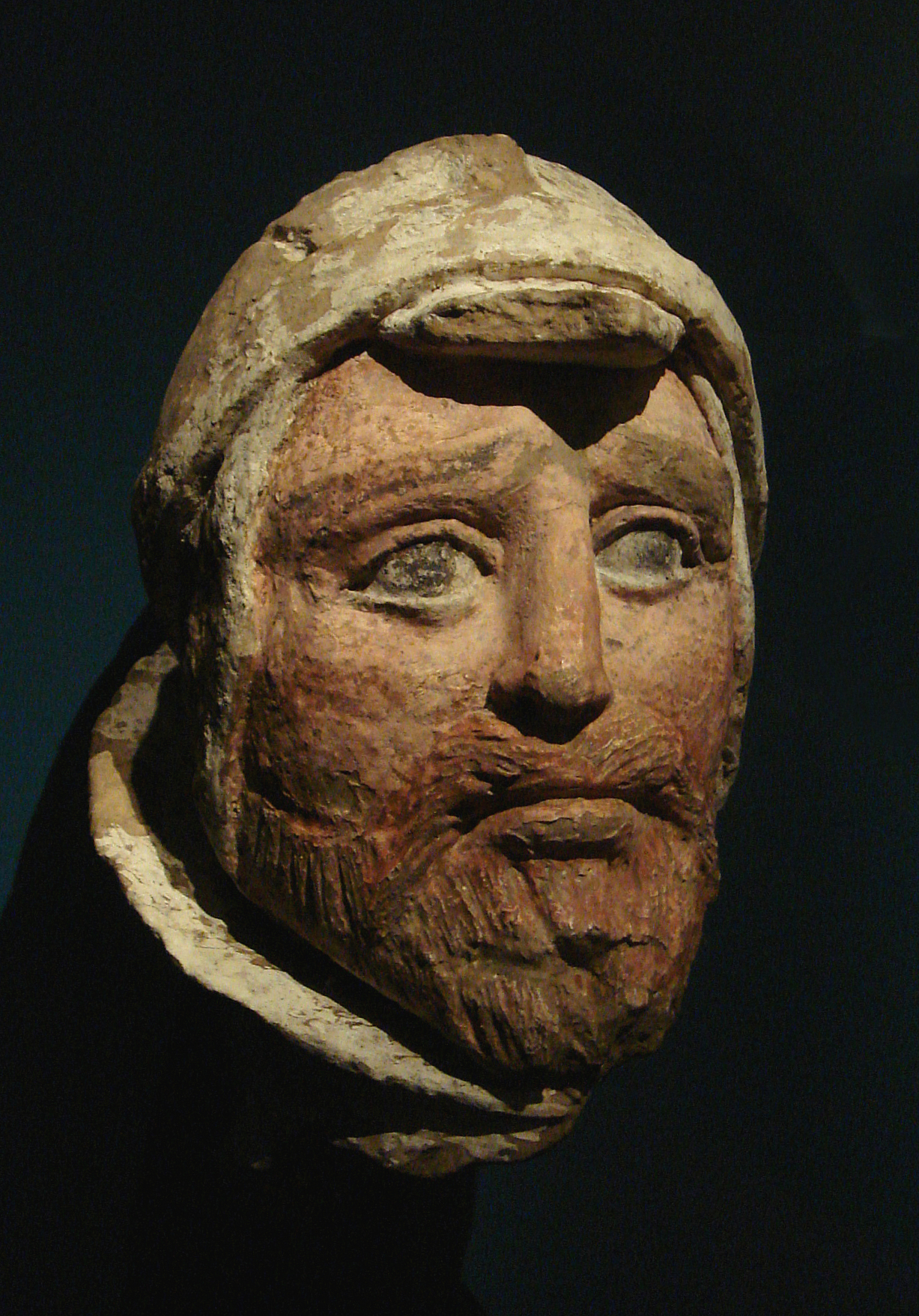
Head of a Saka warrior, as a defeated enemy of the Yuezhi, Khalchayan.

The art of Khalchayan of the end of the 2nd–1st century BC is probably one of the first known manifestations of Kushan art. It is ultimately derived from Hellenistic art, and possibly from the art of the cities of Ai-Khanoum and Nysa. At Khalchayan, rows of in-the-round terracotta statues showed Kushan princes in dignified attitudes, while some of the sculptural scenes are thought to depict the Kushans fighting against the Sakas. The Yuezis are shown with a majestic demeanour, whereas the Sakas are typically represented with side-whiskers, displaying expressive and sometimes grotesque features.

According to Benjamin Rowland, the styles and ethnic type visible in Kalchayan already anticipate the characteristics of the later Art of Gandhara and may even have been at the origin of its development. Rowland particularly draws attention to the similarity of the ethnic types represented at Khalchayan and in the art of Gandhara, and also in the style of portraiture itself. For example, Rowland find a great proximity between the famous head of a Yuezhi prince from Khalchayan, and the head of Gandharan Bodhisattvas, giving the example of the Gandharan head of a Bodhisattva in the Philadelphia Museum of Art. The similarity of the Gandhara Bodhisattva with the portrait of the Kushan ruler Heraios is also striking. According to Rowland the Bactrian art of Khalchayan thus survived for several centuries through its influence in the art of Gandhara, thanks to the patronage of the Kushans.

=== Bactria (1st–3rd century AD) ===
The Kushans apparently favoured royal portraiture, as can be seen in their coins and their dynastic sculptures. A monumental sculpture of King Kanishka I has been found in Mathura in northern India, which is characterized by its frontality and martial stance, as he holds firmly his sword and a mace. His heavy coat and riding boots are typically nomadic Central Asian, and are way too heavy for the warm climate of India. His coat is decorated by hundreds of pearls, which probably symbolize his wealth. His grandiose regnal title is inscribed in the Brahmi script: "The Great King, King of Kings, Son of God, Kanishka".

As the Kushans progressively adapted to life in India, their dress progressively became lighter, and representation less frontal and more natural, although they retained characteristic elements of their nomadic dress, such as the trousers and boots, the heavy tunics, and heavy belts.

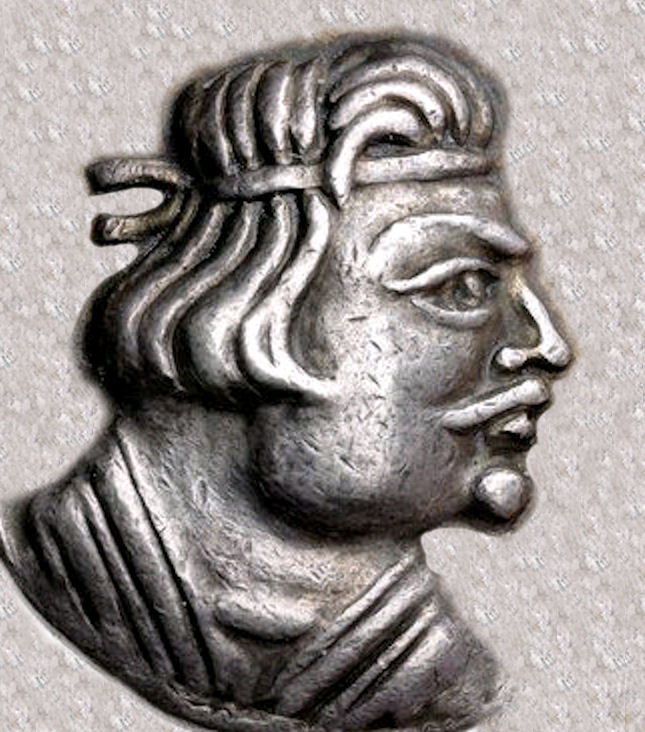
Early Kushan ruler Heraios (1–30 AD), from his coinage.

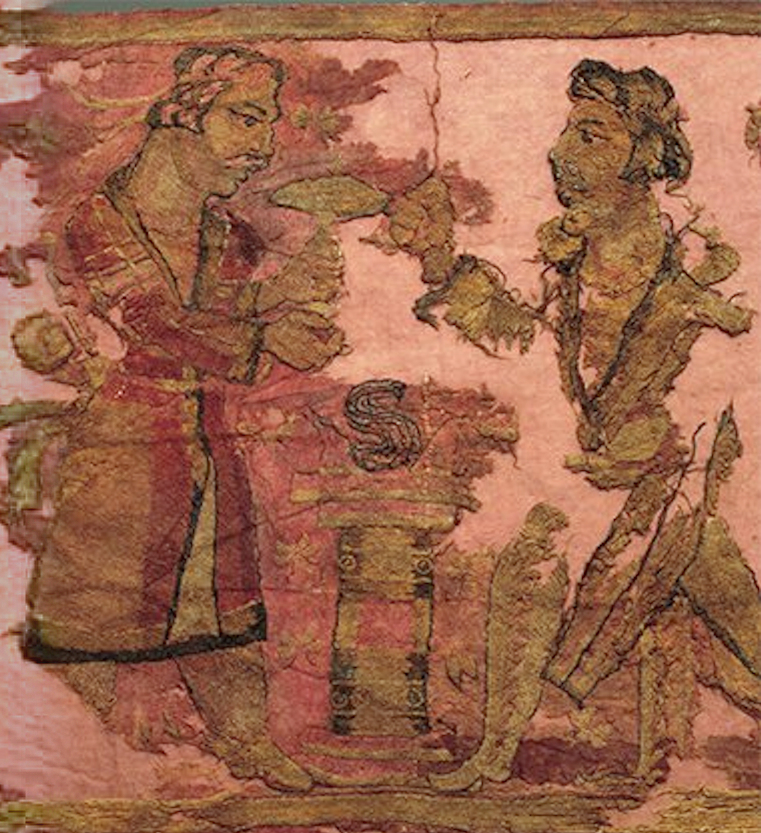
Figures in the embroidered carpets of the Noin-Ula burial site, made in Bactria and proposed to represent Yuezhis (1st century BC – 1st century AD).

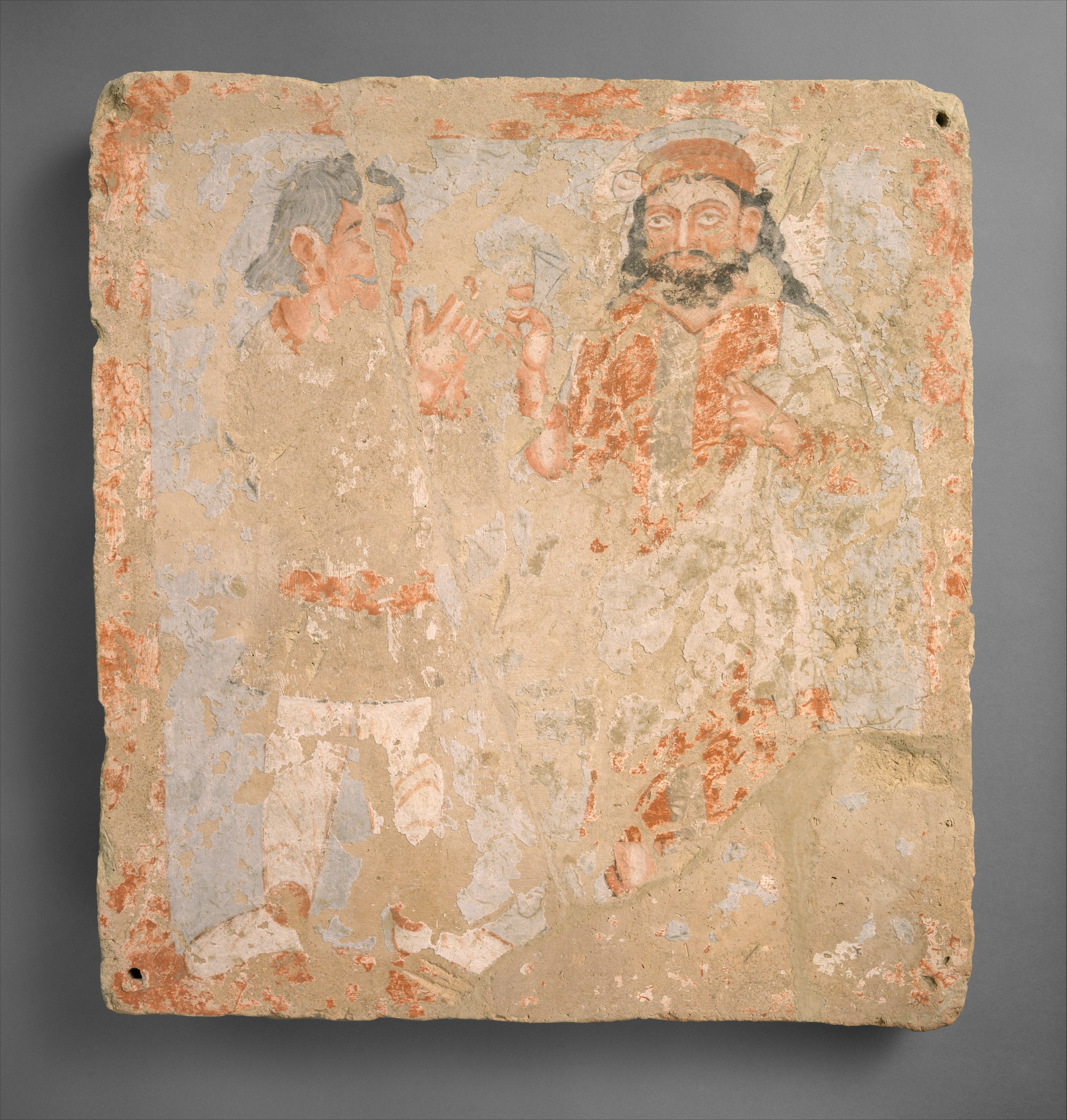
Kushan worshiper with deity Zeus/ Serapis/ Ohrmazd, Bactria, 3rd century AD.

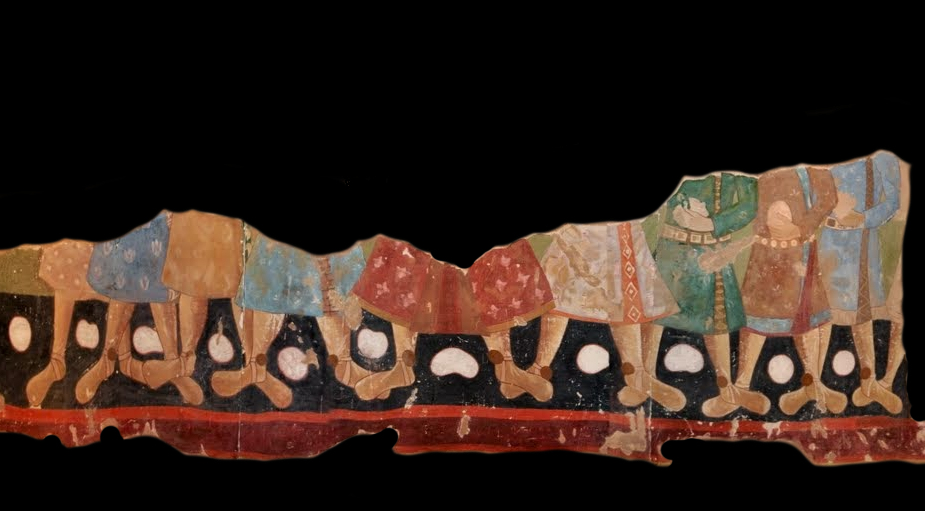
Kushan men in caftan and boots, at Fayaz Tepe

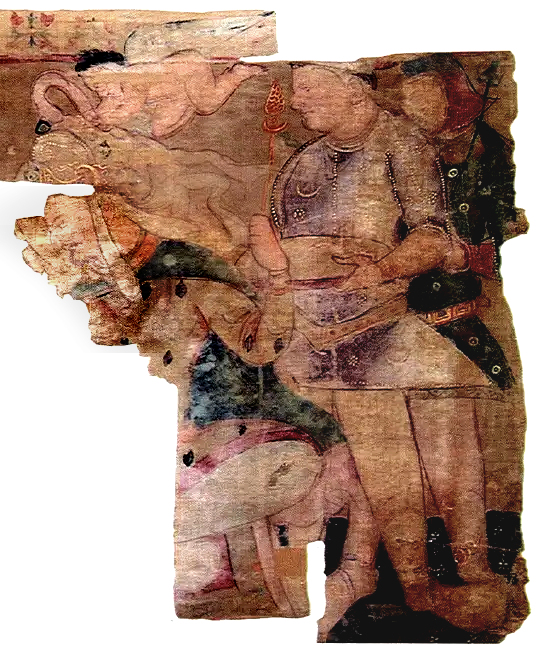
Painting of a Kushan ruler (probably Huvishka, seated) and attendants, Bactria, 74–258 AD.

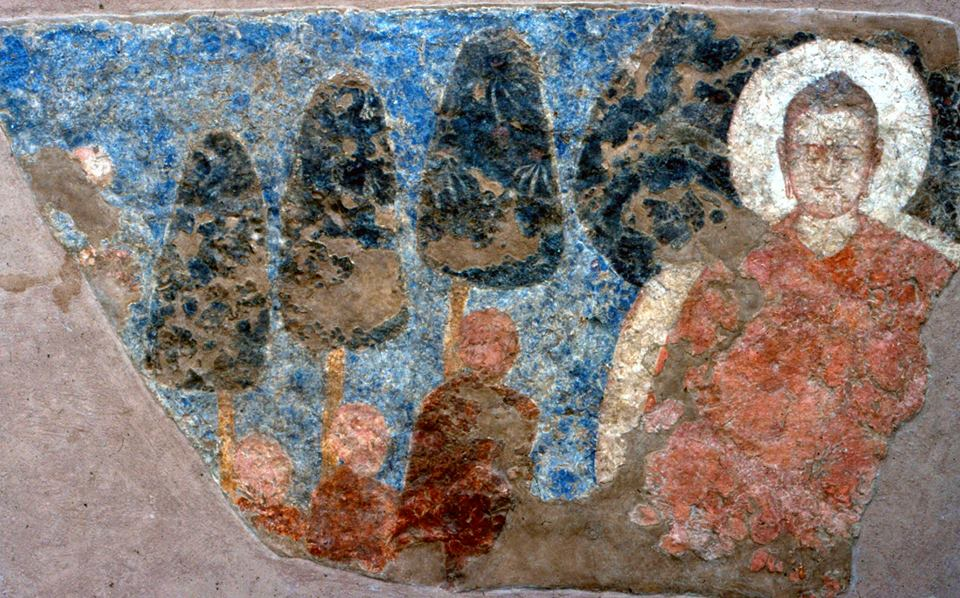
Buddhist mural in Kara Tepe, 2nd–4th century AD.

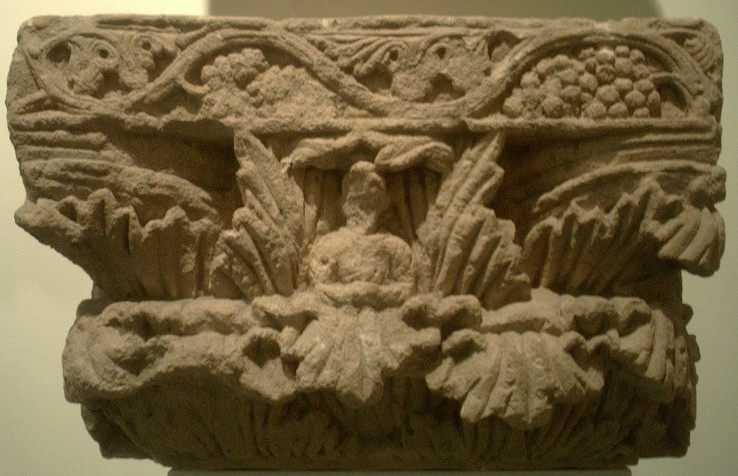
Buddhist pillar capital from Surkh Kotal, with central Buddha figure.

== Kushano-Sasanian art (3rd–4th century AD) ==
The Kushano-Sasanian Kingdom (also called "Kushanshas" KΟÞANΟ ÞAΟ Koshano Shao in Bactrian) is a historiographic term used by modern scholars to refer to a branch of the Sasanian Persians who established their rule in Bactria and in northwestern Indian subcontinent (present day Pakistan) during the 3rd and 4th centuries AD at the expense of the declining Kushans. They captured the provinces of Sogdiana, Bactria and Gandhara from the Kushans in 225 AD. The Kushano-Sassanids traded goods such as silverware and textiles depicting the Sassanid emperors engaged in hunting or administering justice. The example of Sassanid art was influential on Kushan art, and this influence remained active for several centuries in northwest South Asia.

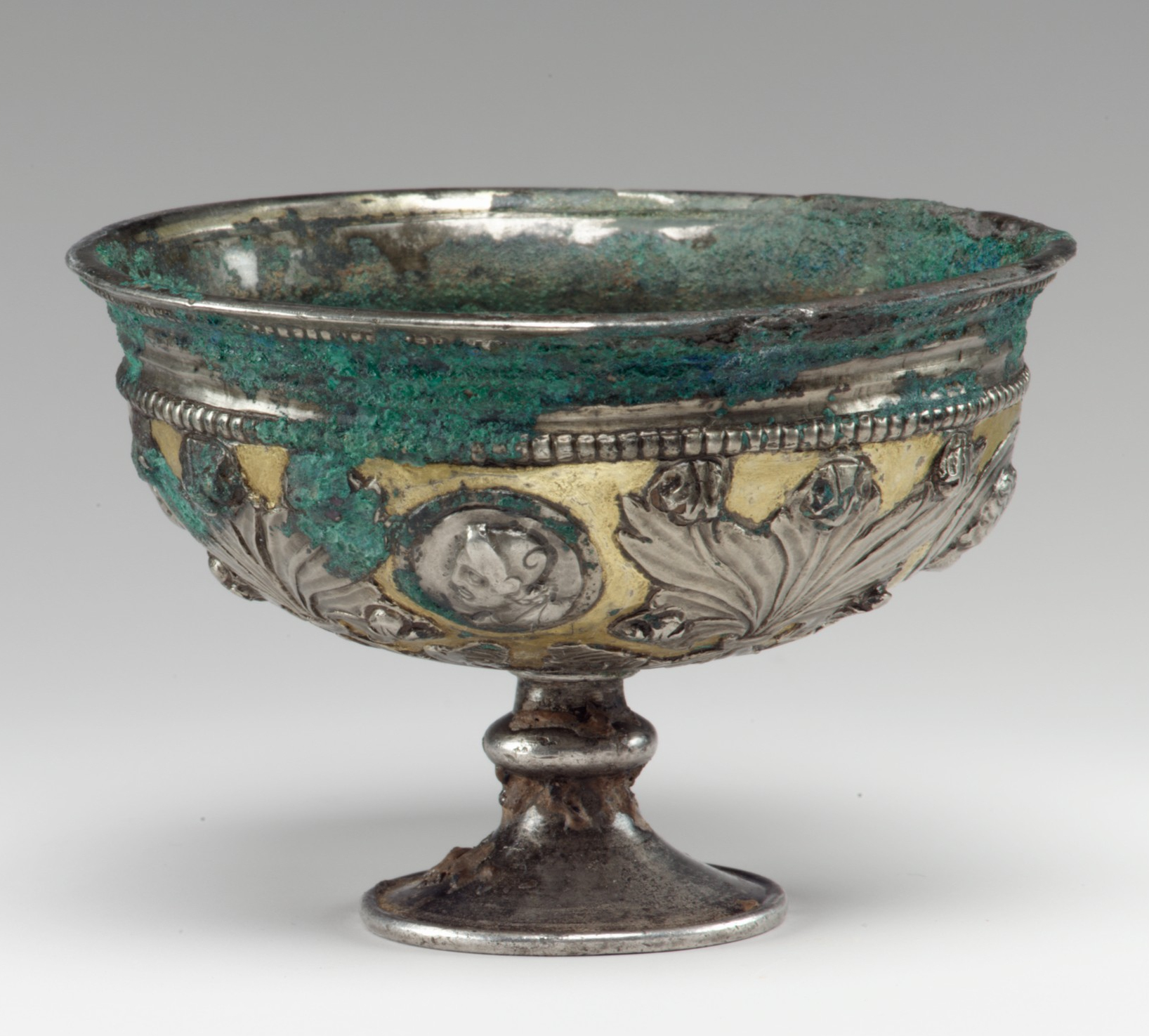
Kushano-Sasanian footed cup with medallion, 3rd-4th century AD, Bactria, Metropolitan Museum of Art.

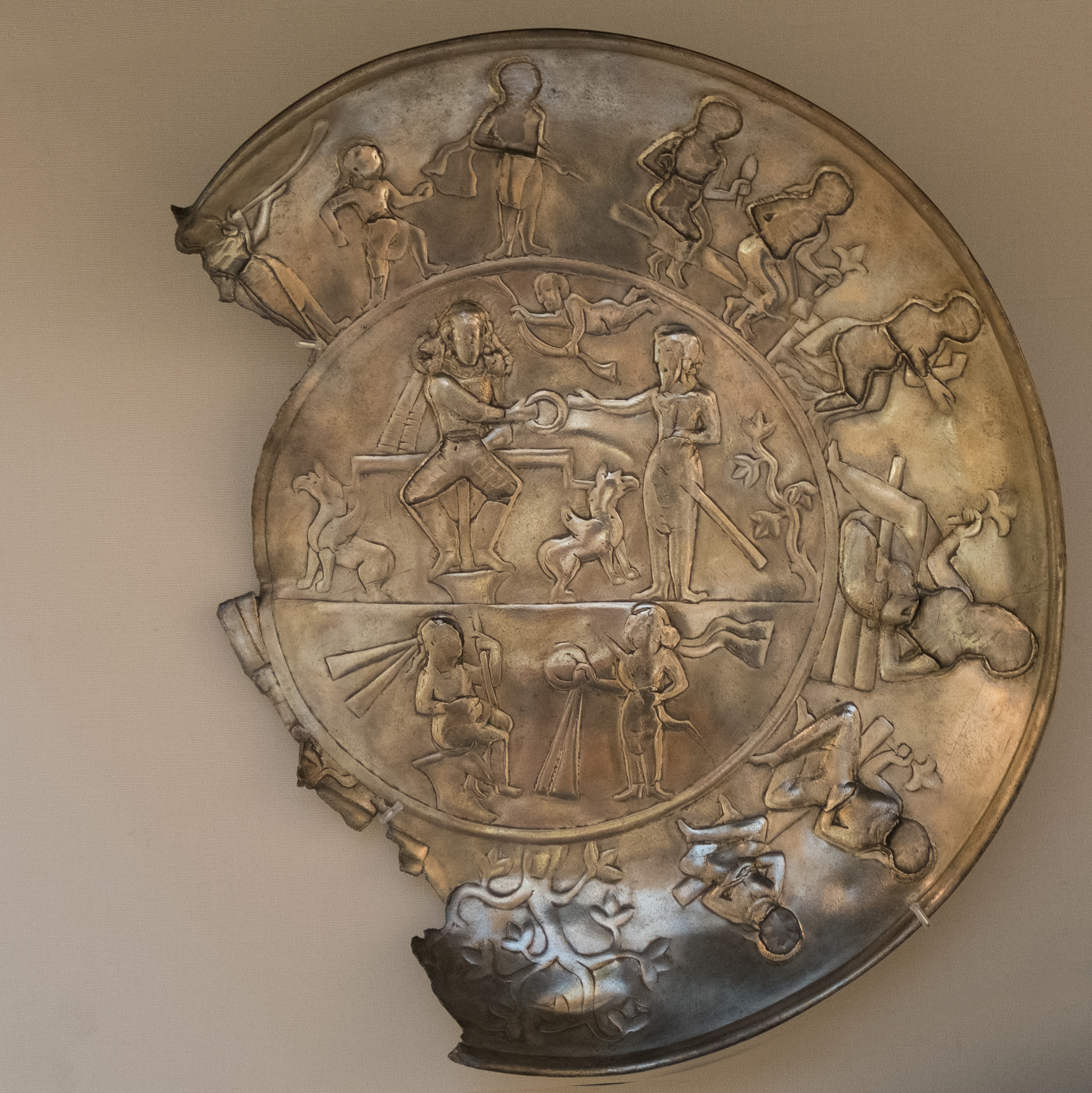
Possible Kushano-Sasanian plate, excavated in Rawalpindi, Pakistan, 350–400 AD. British Museum 124093.

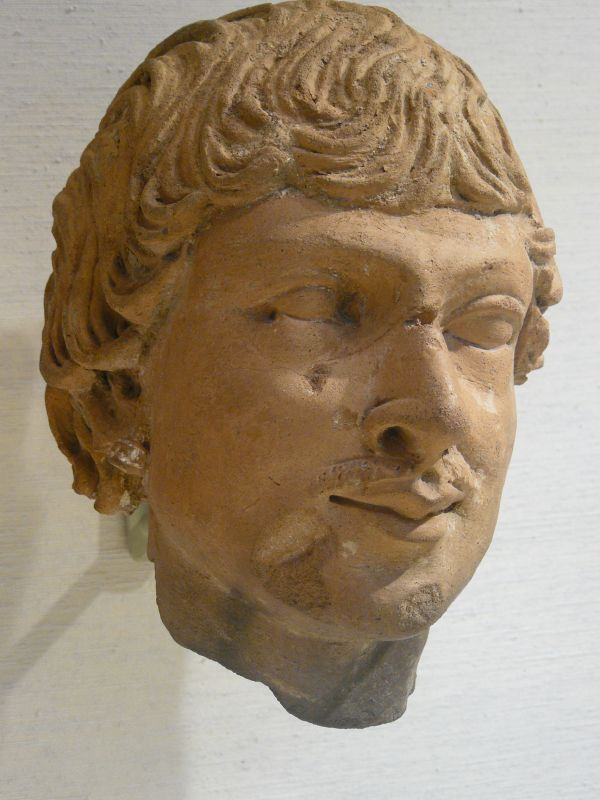
Terracotta head of a male figure, Kushano-Sasanian period, Gandhara region, 4th–5th century AD

== Huns ==
The Huns, a nomadic people, lived in Central Asia, the Caucasus, and Eastern Europe between the 4th and 6th centuries AD. The nomadic nature of Hun society means that they have left very little in the archaeological record. Archaeological finds have produced a large number of cauldrons that have (since the work of Paul Reinecke in 1896) been identified as having been produced by the Huns. Although typically described as "bronze cauldrons", the cauldrons are often made of copper, which is generally of poor quality. Maenchen-Helfen lists 19 known finds of Hunnish cauldrons from all over Central and Eastern Europe and Western Siberia. They come in various shapes, and are sometimes found together with vessels of various other origins.

Both ancient sources and archaeological finds from graves confirm that the Huns wore elaborately decorated golden or gold-plated diadems. Maenchen-Helfen lists a total of six known Hunnish diadems. Hunnic women seem to have worn necklaces and bracelets of mostly imported beads of various materials as well. The later common early medieval practice of decorating jewelry and weapons with gemstones appears to have originated with the Huns. They are also known to have made small mirrors of an originally Chinese type, which often appear to have been intentionally broken when placed into a grave.

Archaeological finds indicate that the Huns wore gold plaques as ornaments on their clothing, as well as imported glass beads. Ammianus reports that they wore clothes made of linen or the furs of marmots and leggings of goatskin.

Kim sees the Huns as incorporating multiple homogeneous artistic styles of the steppe peoples and as influential in developing the future art of Europe.

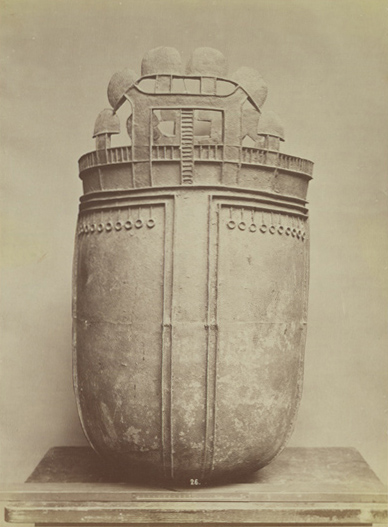
A Hunnish cauldron

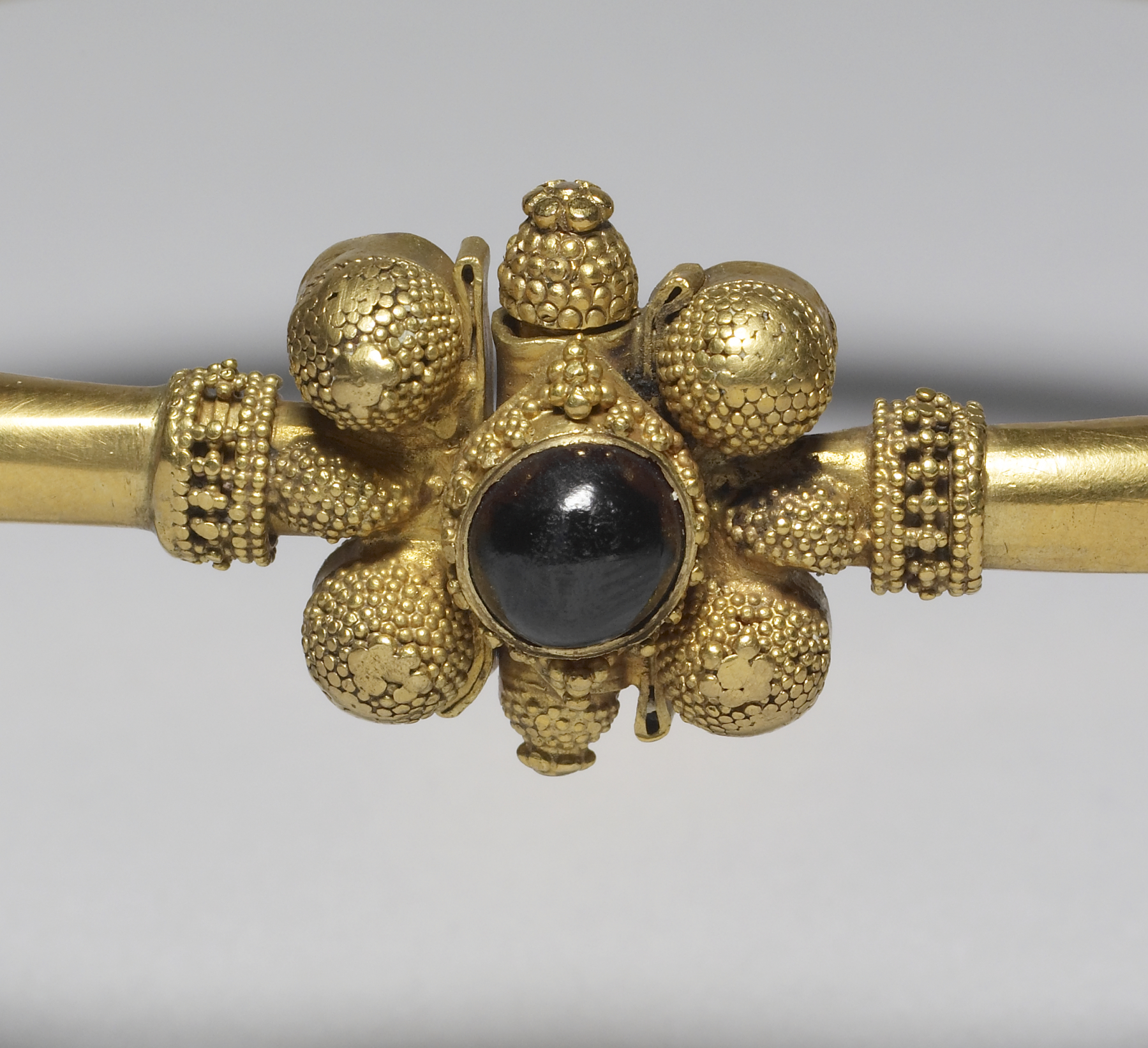
Detail of Hunnish gold and garnet bracelet, 5th century, Walters Art Museum

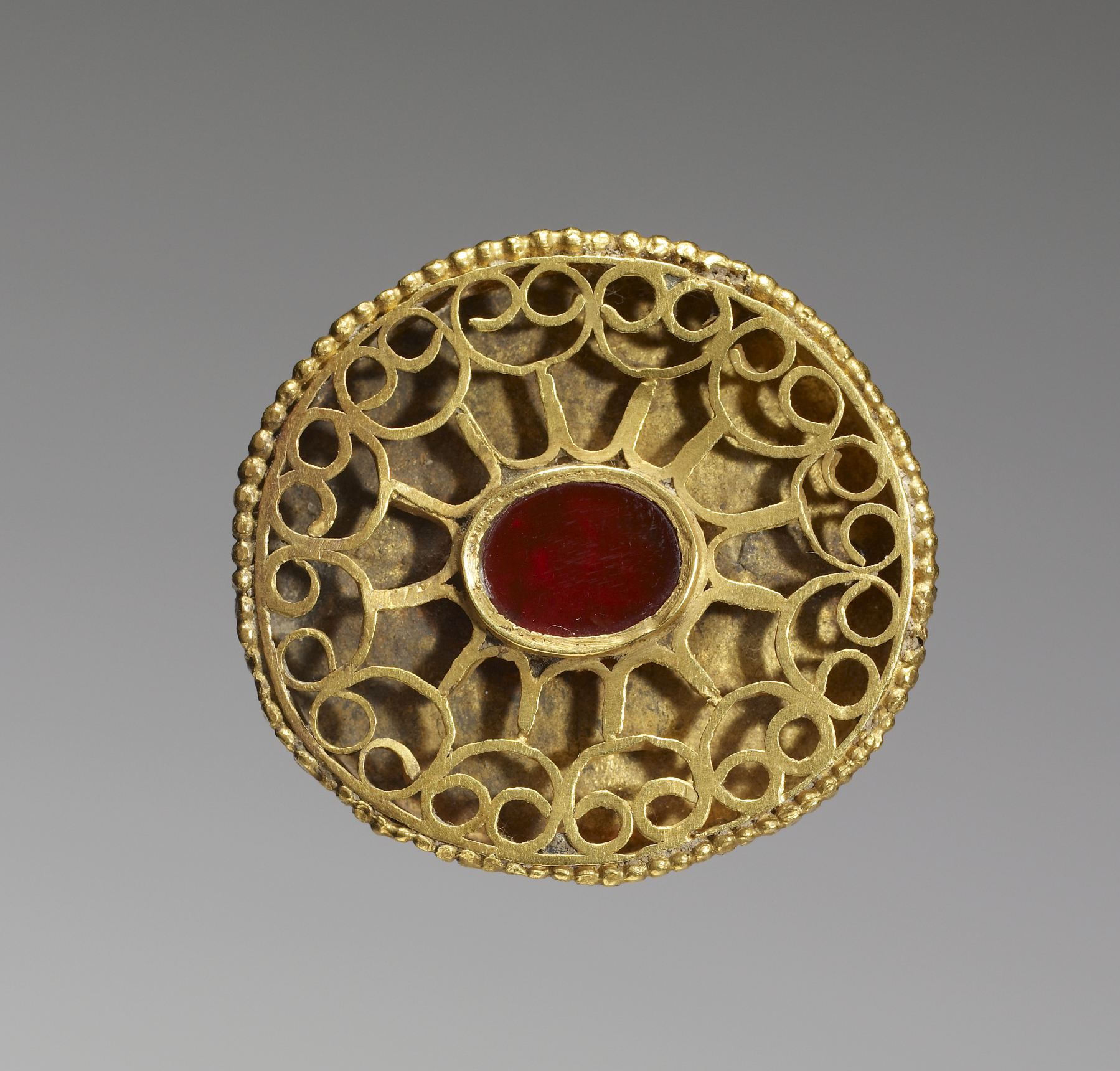
A Hunnish oval openwork fibula set with a carnelian and decorated with a geometric pattern of gold wire, 4th century, Walters Art Museum

=== Kidarites ===
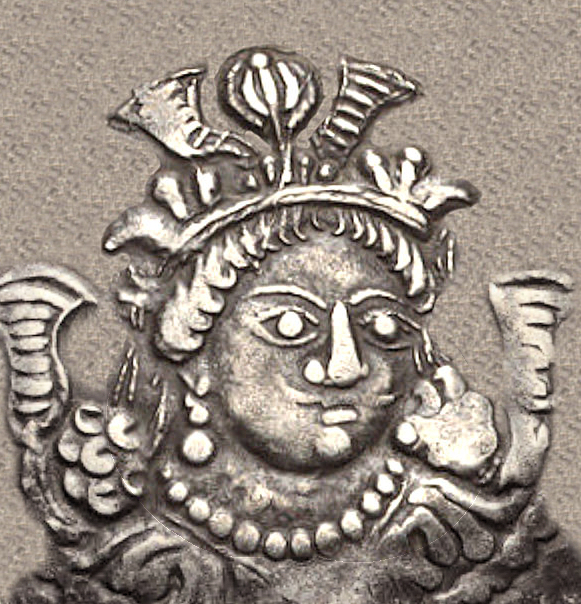
Portrait of Kidara, king of the Kidarites, circa 350–386. The coinage of the Kidarites imitated Sasanian imperial coinage, with the exception that they displayed clean-shaven faces, instead of the beards of the Sasanians, a feature relating them to Altaic rather than Iranian lineage.

The Kidarites, or "Kidara Huns", were a dynasty that ruled Bactria and adjoining parts of Central Asia and South Asia in the 4th and 5th centuries. The Kidarites belonged to a complex of peoples known collectively in India as the Huna, and in Europe as the Chionites (from the Iranian names Xwn/Xyon), and may even be considered as identical to the Chionites. The 5th century Byzantine historian Priscus called them Kidarites Huns, or "Huns who are Kidarites". The Huna/ Xionite tribes are often linked, albeit controversially, to the Huns who invaded Eastern Europe during a similar period. They are entirely different from the Hephthalites, who replaced them about a century later.

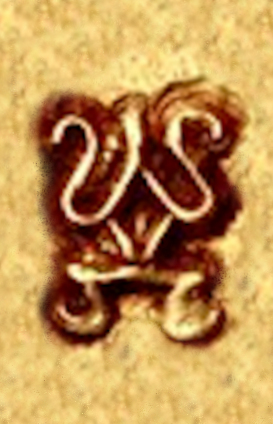
Kidarite tamga symbol appears to the right of the standing king. Balkh mint.

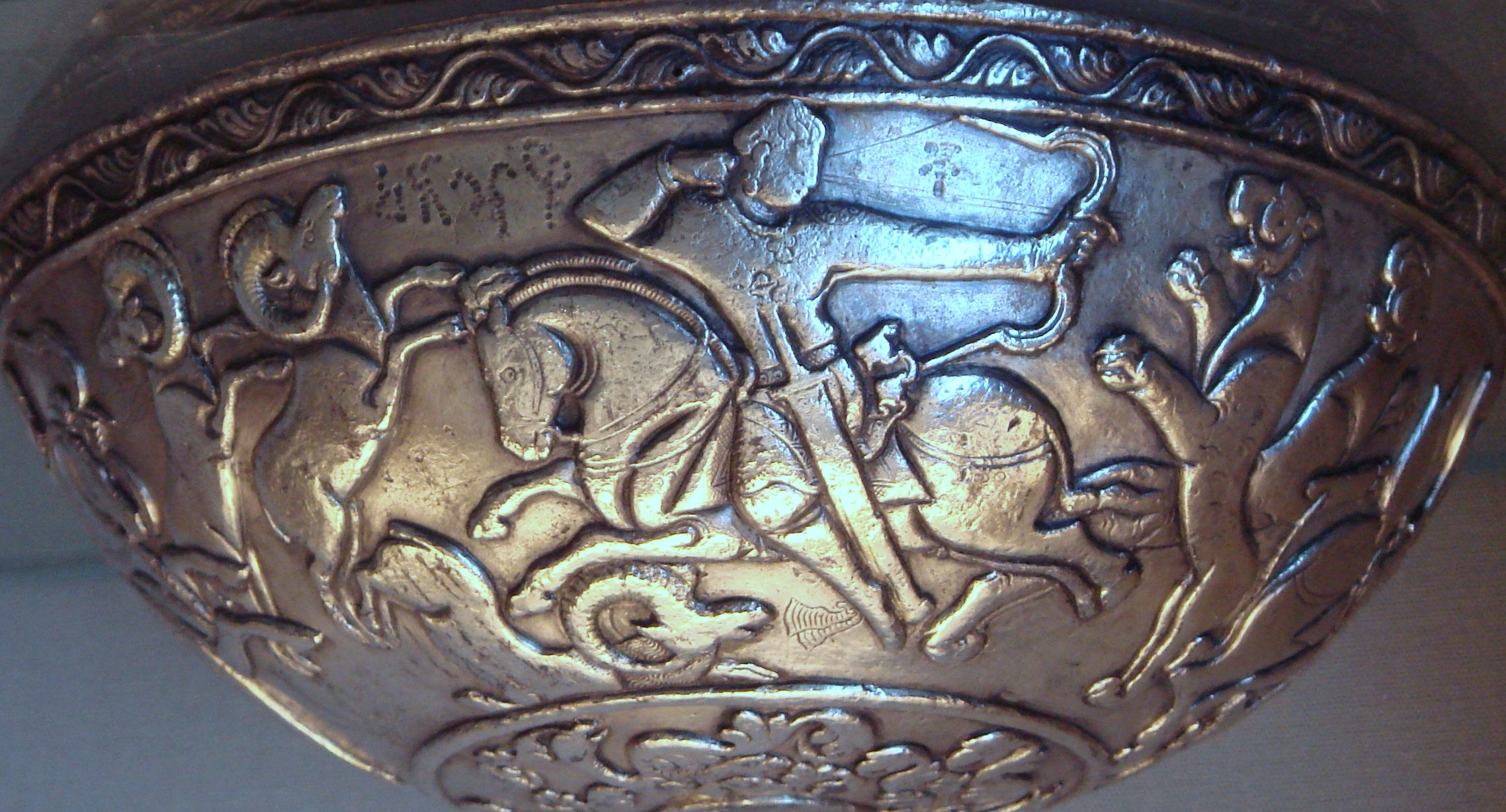
Silver bowl, showing an Alchon horseman

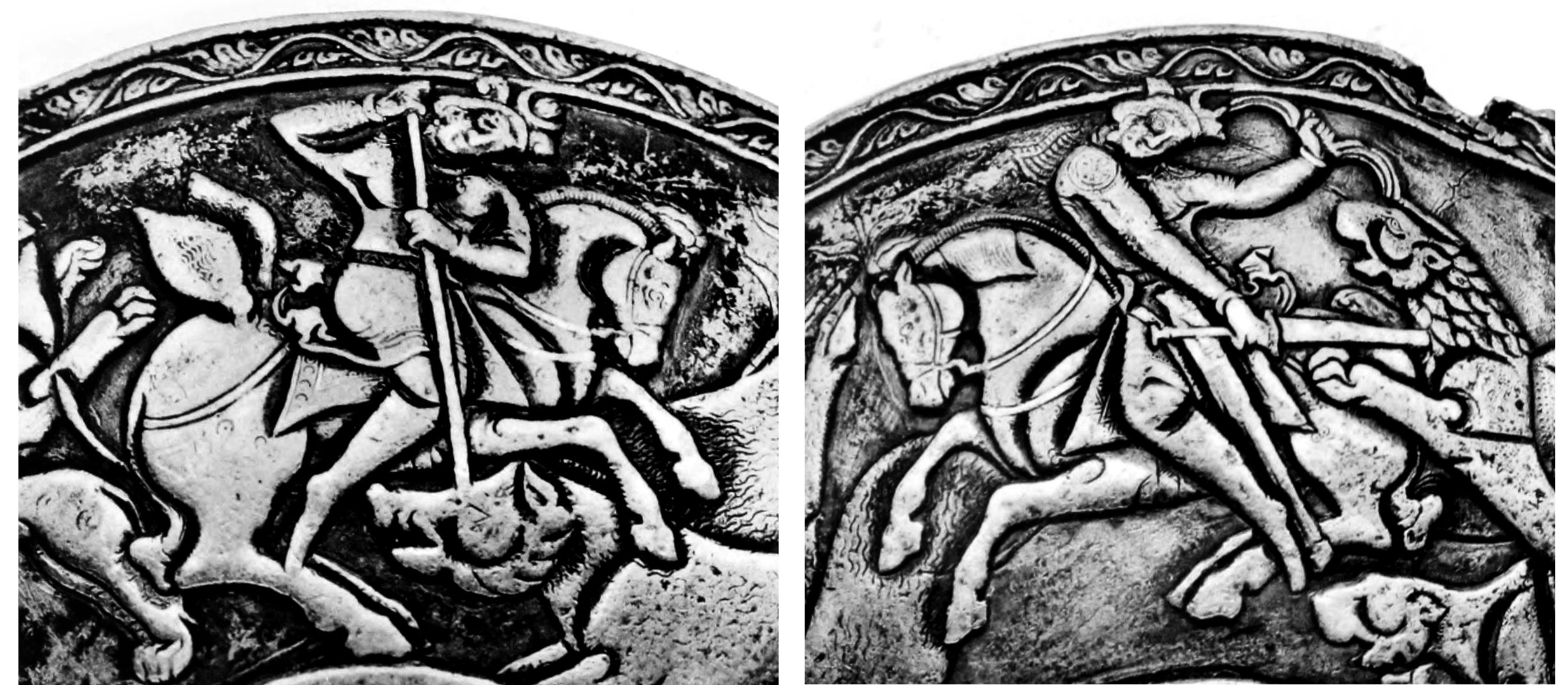
Two Kidarite princes on the Hephthalite bowl

=== Hephthalite art (4th–6th century AD) ===
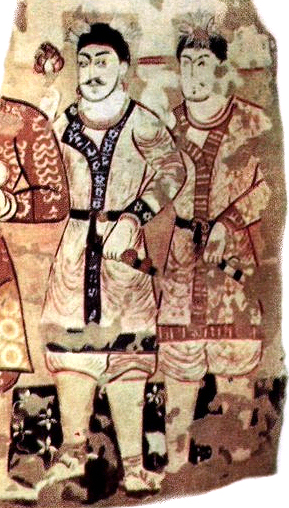
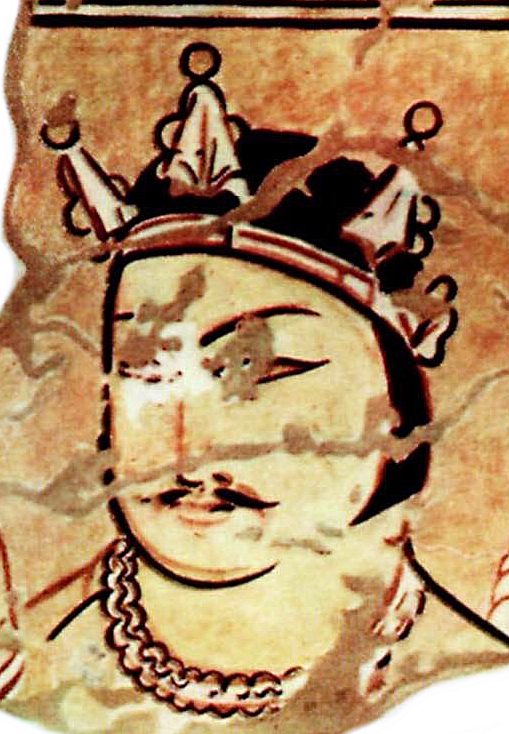
Murals from Dilberjin Tepe, thought to represent early Hephthalites. The ruler wears a radiate crown which is comparable to the crown of the king on the "Yabghu of the Hephthalites" seal.

The Hephthalites (Bactrian: ηβοδαλο, romanized: Ebodalo), sometimes called the "White Huns", were a people who lived in Central Asia during the 5th to 8th centuries. They existed as an Empire, the "Imperial Hephthalites", and were militarily important from 450 AD, when they defeated the Kidarites, to 560 AD, date of their defeat to combined First Turkic Khaganate and Sasanian Empire forces.

The Hepthalites appears in several mural paintings in the area of Tokharistan, especially in banquet scenes at Balalyk tepe and as donors to the Buddha in the ceiling painting of the 35-meter Buddha at the Buddhas of Bamiyan. Several of the figures in these paintings have a characteristic appearance, with belted jackets with a unique lapel of their tunic being folded on the right side, a style which became popular under the Hephthalites, the cropped hair, the hair accessories, their distinctive physiognomy and their round beardless faces. The figures at Bamiyan must represent the donors and potentates who supported the building of the monumental giant Buddha. These remarkable paintings participate "to the artistic tradition of the Hephthalite ruling classes of Tukharistan".

The paintings related to the Hephthalites have often been grouped under the appellation of "Tokharistan school of art", or the "Hephthalite stage in the History of Central Asia Art". The paintings of Tavka Kurgan, of very high quality, also belong to this school of art, and are closely related to other paintings of the Tokharistan school such as Balalyk tepe, in the depiction of clothes, and especially in the treatment of the faces.

This "Hephthalite period" in art, with the caftans with a triangular collar folded on the right, the particular cropped hairstyle, the crowns with crescents, have been found in many of the areas historically occupied and ruled by the Hephthalites, in Sogdia, Bamiyan (modern Afghanistan), or in Kucha in the Tarim Basin (modern Xinjiang, China). This points to a "political and cultural unification of Central Asia" with similar artistic styles and iconography, under the rule of the Hephthalites.

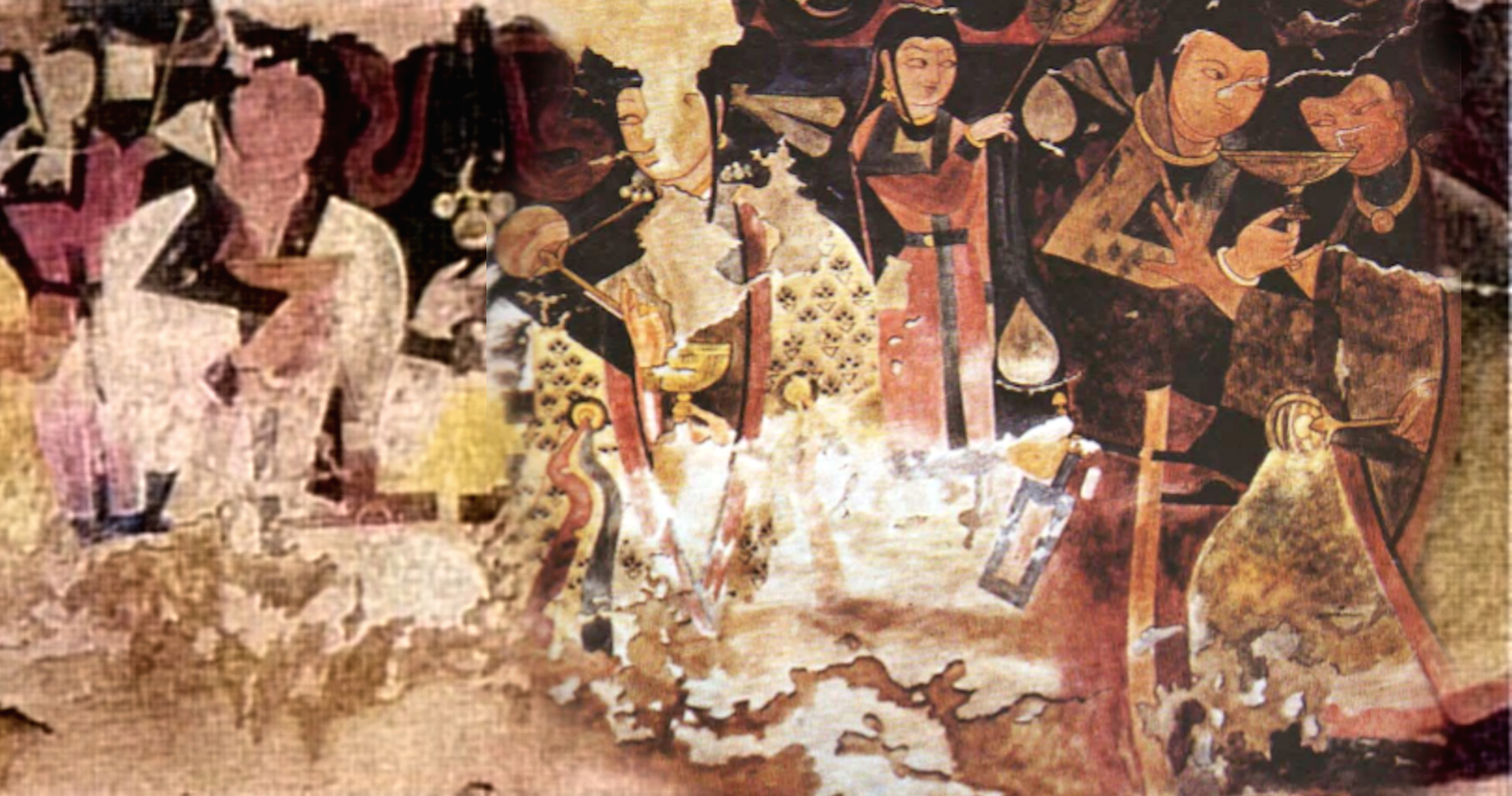
The banquet scenes in the murals of Balalyk Tepe show the life of the Hephthalite ruling class of Tokharistan.

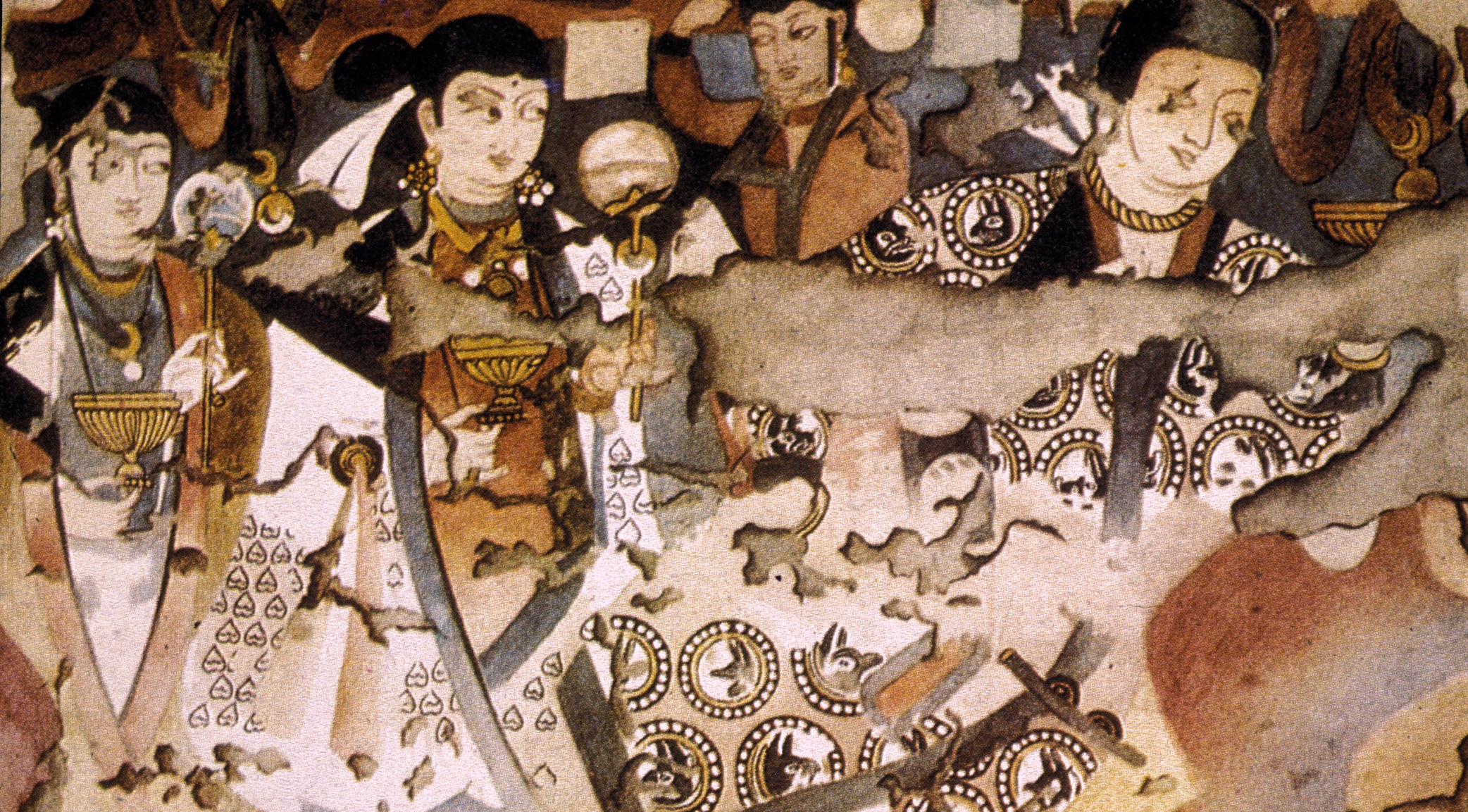
Banquet scene, Balalyk Tepe

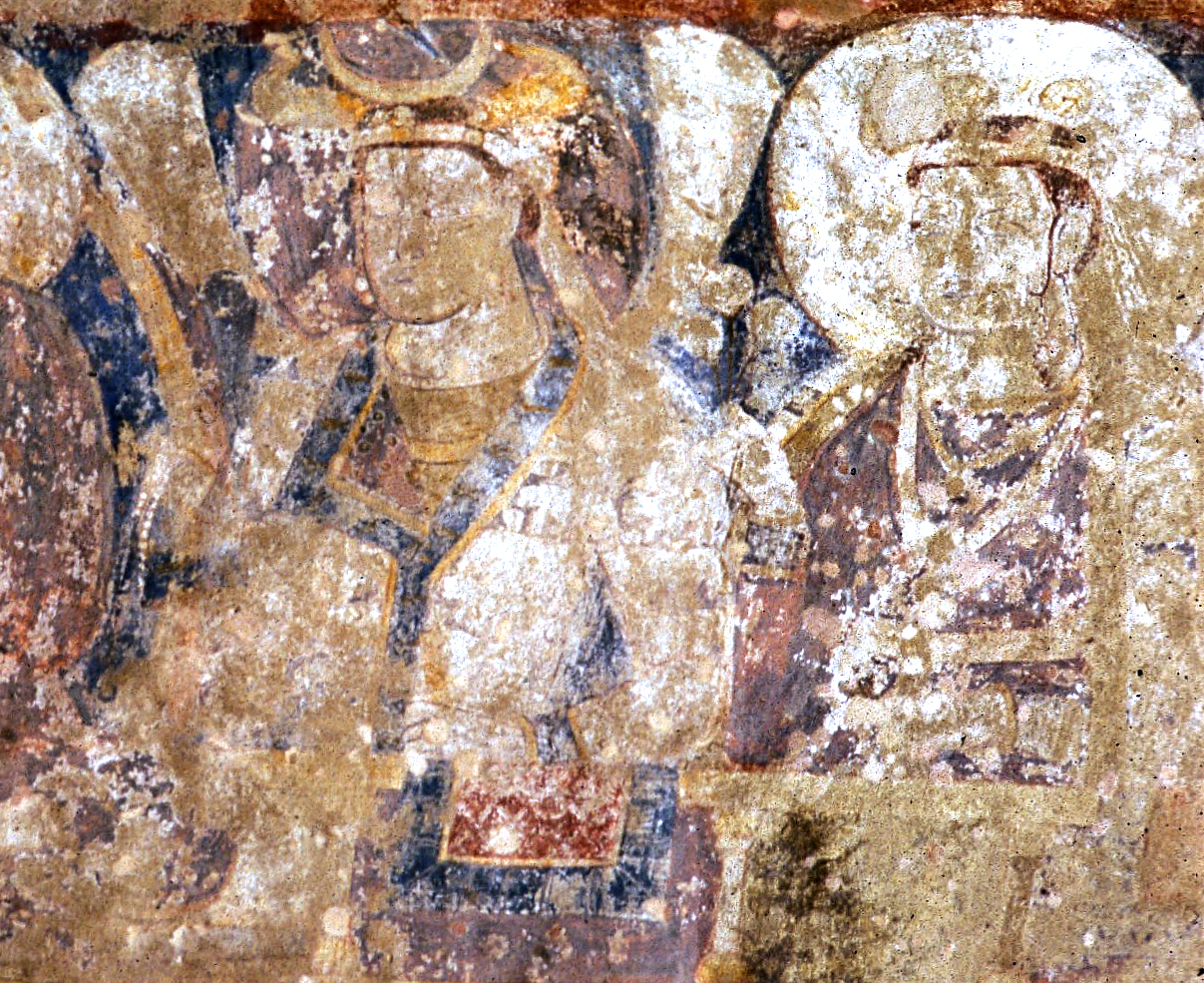
Probable Hephthalite royal couple in the murals of the Buddhas of Bamiyan circa 600 AD (the 38-meter Buddha they decorate is carbon dated to 544–595 AD).

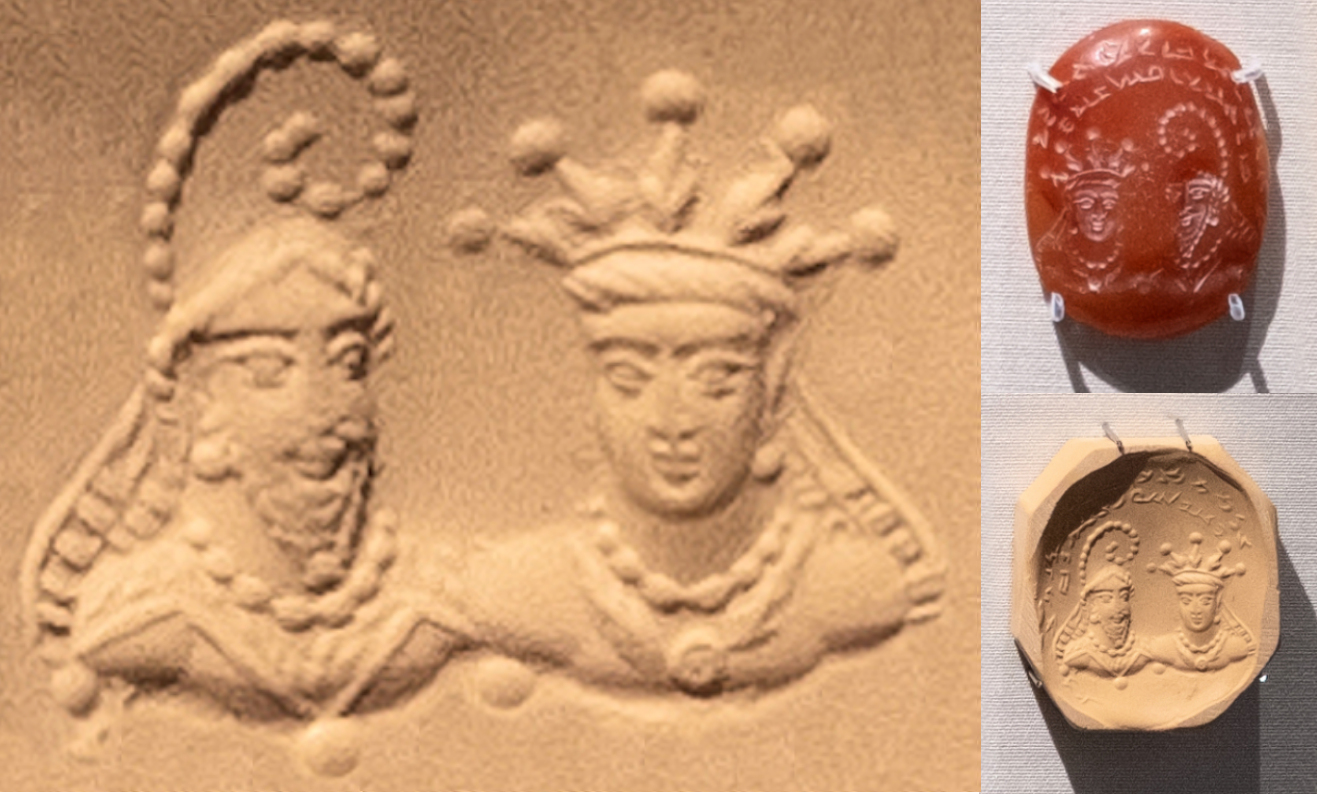
Stamp seal with a bearded figure in Sasanian dress, wearing the kulāf denoting nobility and officials; and a figure with radiate crown, both with royal ribbons. Attributed to the Hephthalites, and recently dated to the 5th–6th century AD. Stamp seal (BM 119999), British Museum.

== Buddhist art of Bamiyan ==
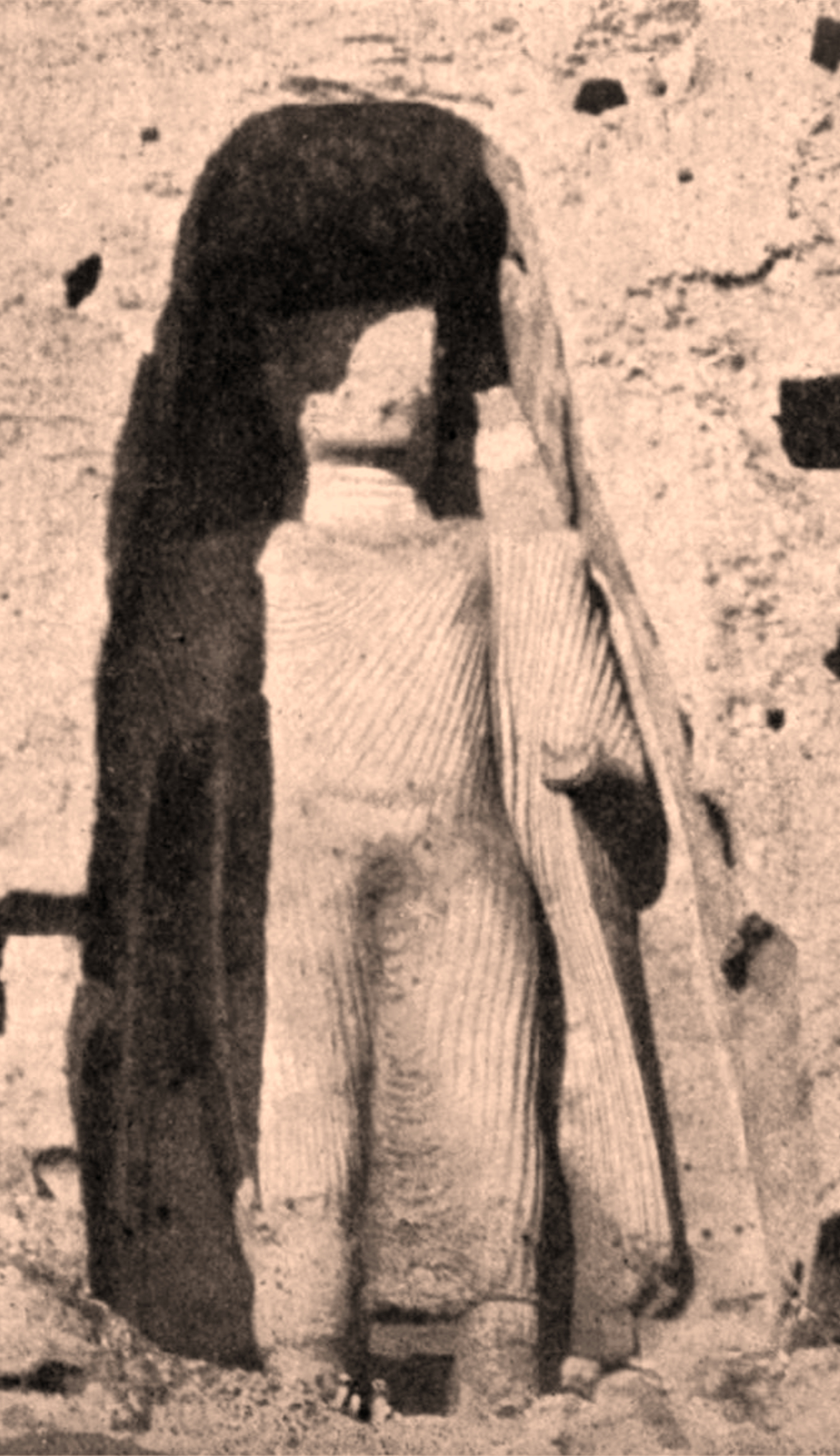
Smaller 38-meter "Eastern" Buddha

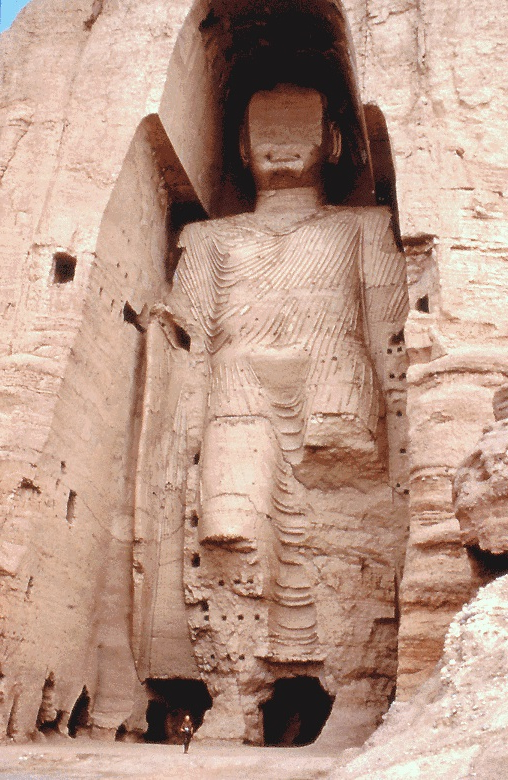
Larger 55-meter "Western" Buddha

The Buddhas of Bamiyan (shown before 2001), were carbon-dated to 544–595 AD and 591–644 AD respectively.

The Buddhist art of Bamiyan covers a period from the early centuries of the Common Era, culminating with the building of the Buddhas of Bamiyan in the 6th-century AD. monumental statues of Gautama Buddha carved into the side of a cliff in the Bamyan valley of central Afghanistan, 130 kilometres (81 mi) northwest of Kabul at an elevation of 2,500 metres (8,200 ft). Carbon dating of the structural components of the Buddhas has determined that the smaller 38 m (125 ft) "Eastern Buddha" was built around 570 AD, and the larger 55 m (180 ft) "Western Buddha" was built around 618 AD.

The statues represented a later evolution of the classic blended style of Gandhara art. The statues consisted of the male Salsal ("light shines through the universe") and the (smaller) female Shamama ("Queen Mother"), as they were called by the locals. The main bodies were hewn directly from the sandstone cliffs, but details were modeled in mud mixed with straw, coated with stucco. This coating, practically all of which wore away long ago, was painted to enhance the expressions of the faces, hands, and folds of the robes; the larger one was painted carmine red and the smaller one was painted multiple colors. The lower parts of the statues' arms were constructed from the same mud-straw mix supported on wooden armatures. It is believed that the upper parts of their faces were made from great wooden masks or casts. The rows of holes that can be seen in photographs held wooden pegs that stabilized the outer stucco.

The Buddhas are surrounded by numerous caves and surfaces decorated with paintings. It is thought that the period of florescence was from the 6th to 8th century AD, until the onset of Islamic invasions. These works of art are considered as an artistic synthesis of Buddhist art and Gupta art from India, with influences from the Sasanian Empire and the Byzantine Empire, as well as the country of Tokharistan.

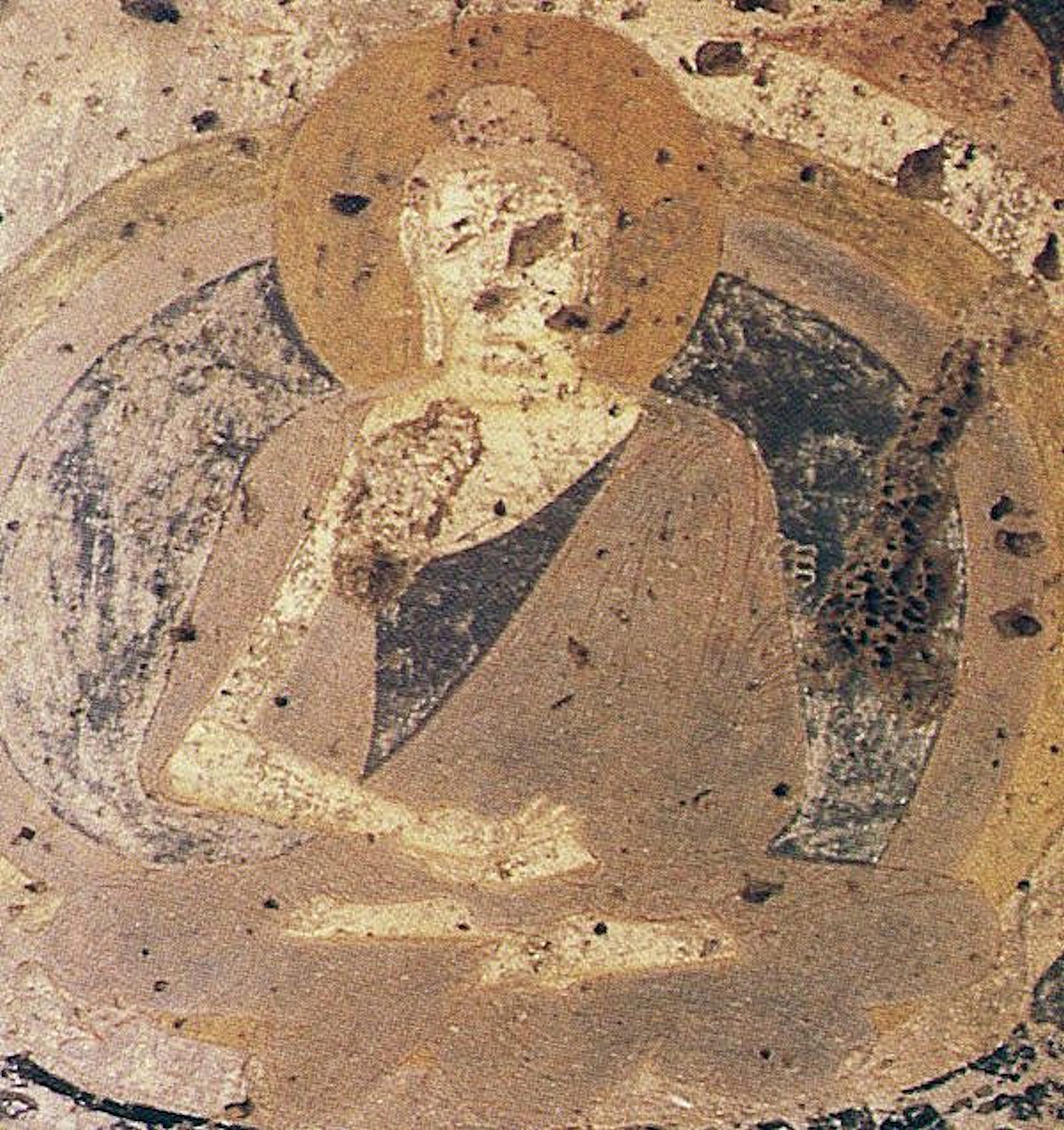
Buddha, Cave 404 in Bamiyan.

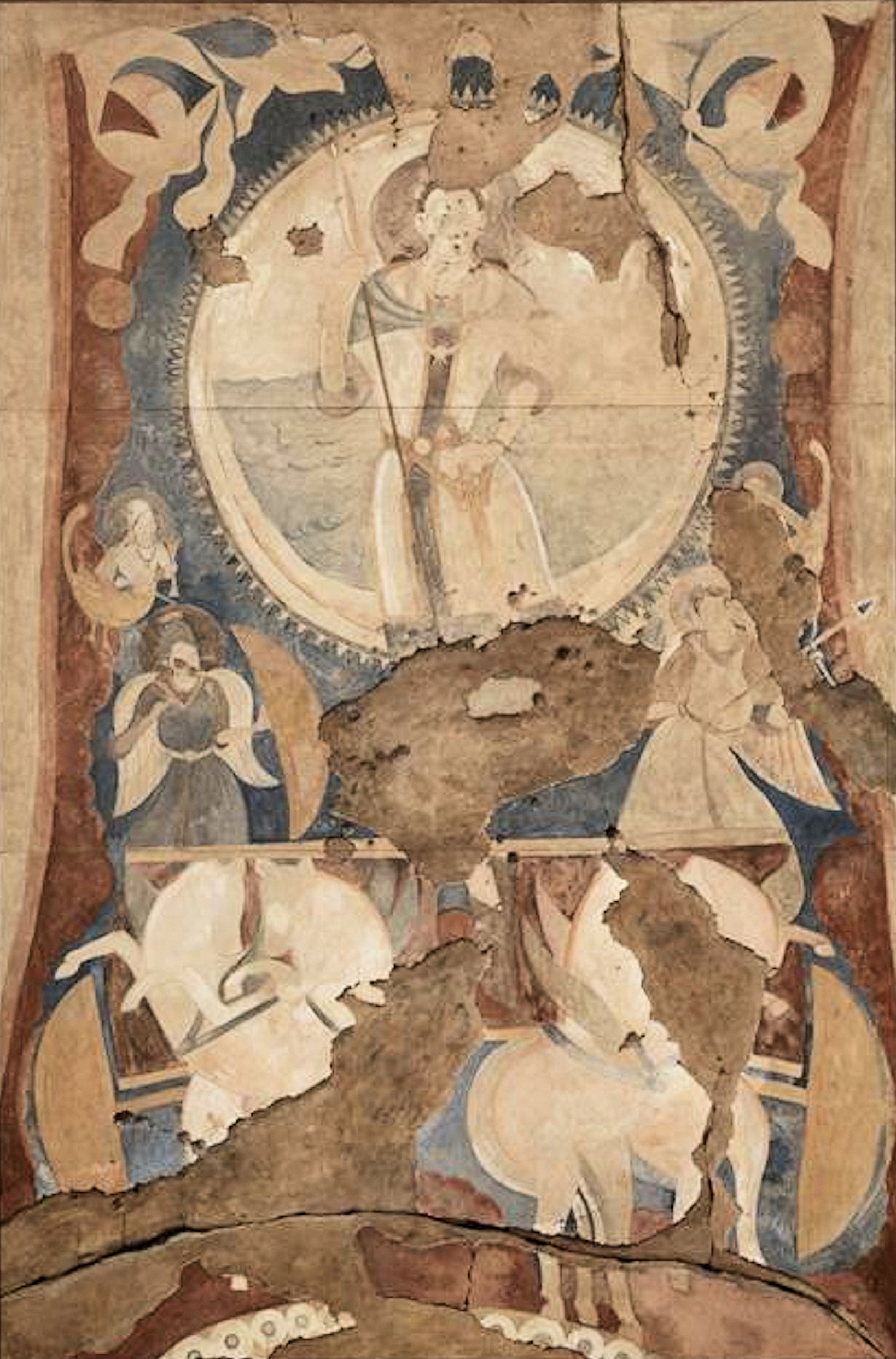
Sun-God Surya on his chariot

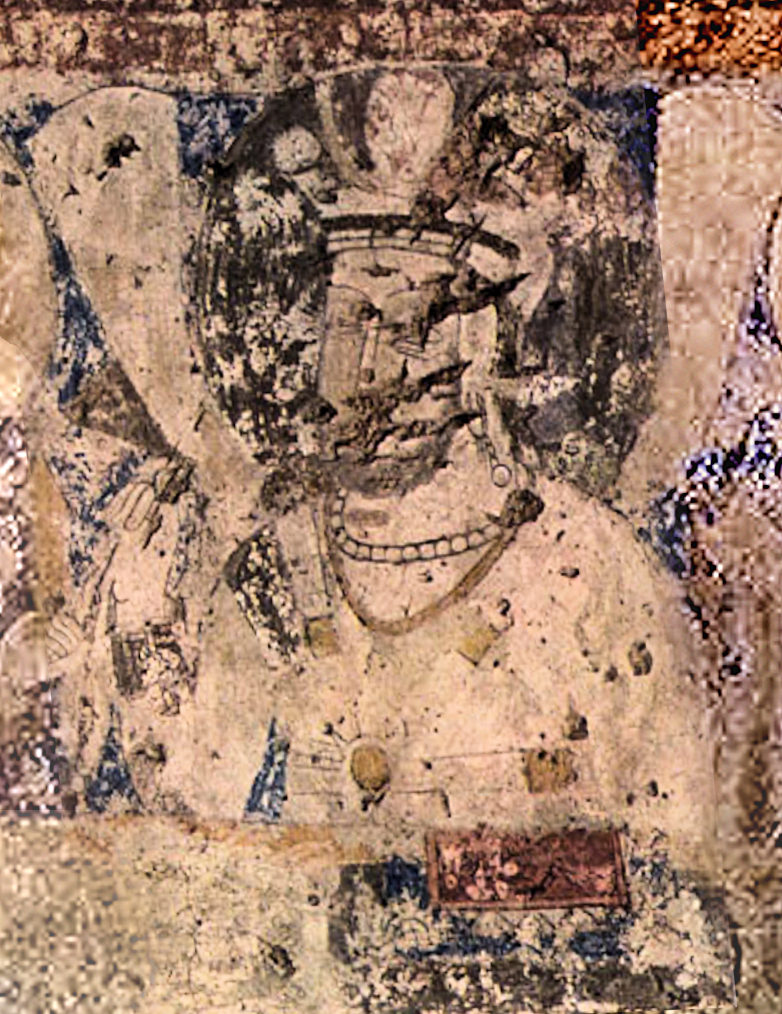
Probable King of Bamiyan, in Sasanian style, in the niche of the 38 meters Buddha, next to the Sun God, Bamiyan.

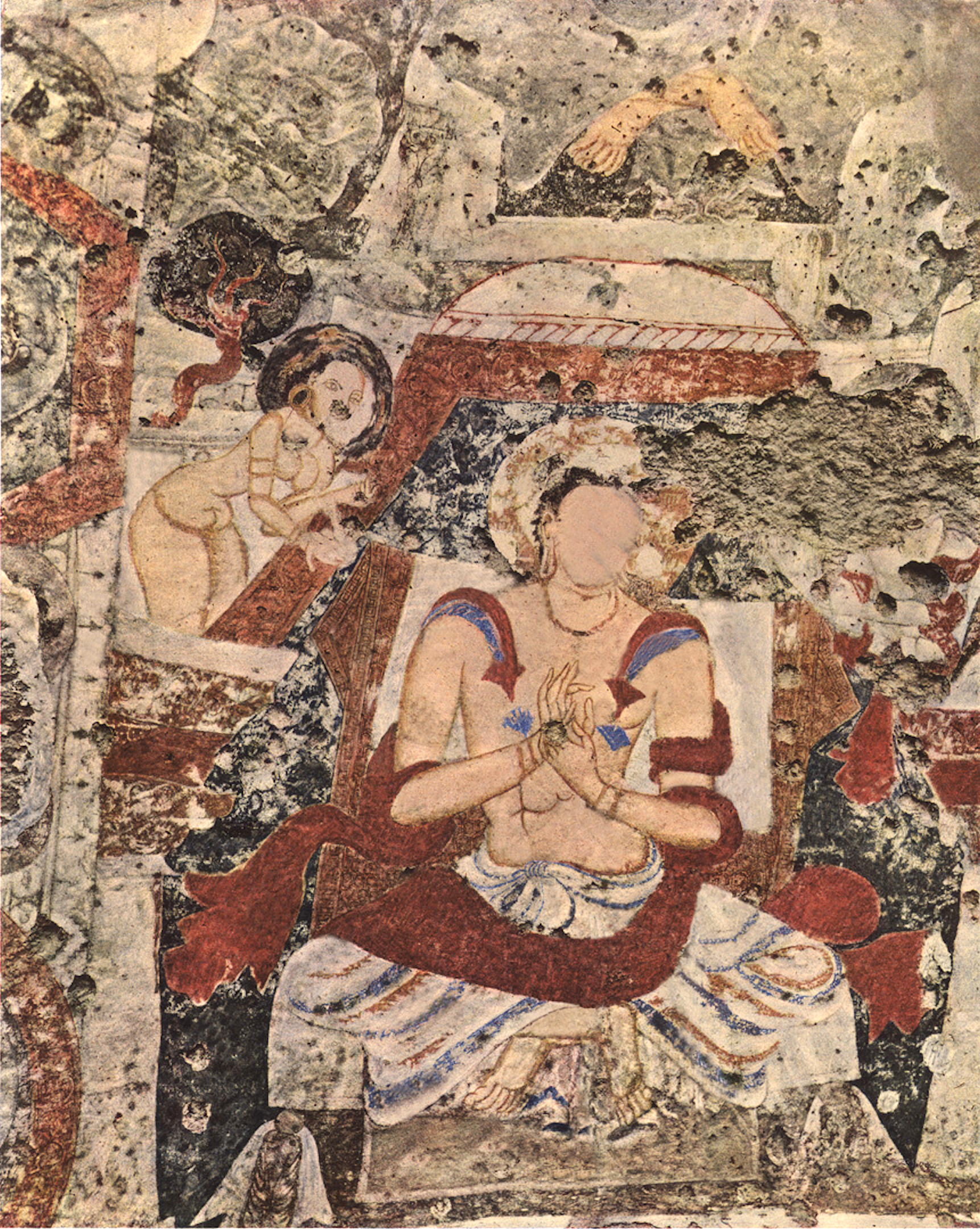
Western Buddha, Niche, ceiling, east section E1 and E2.

== Tarim Basin ==
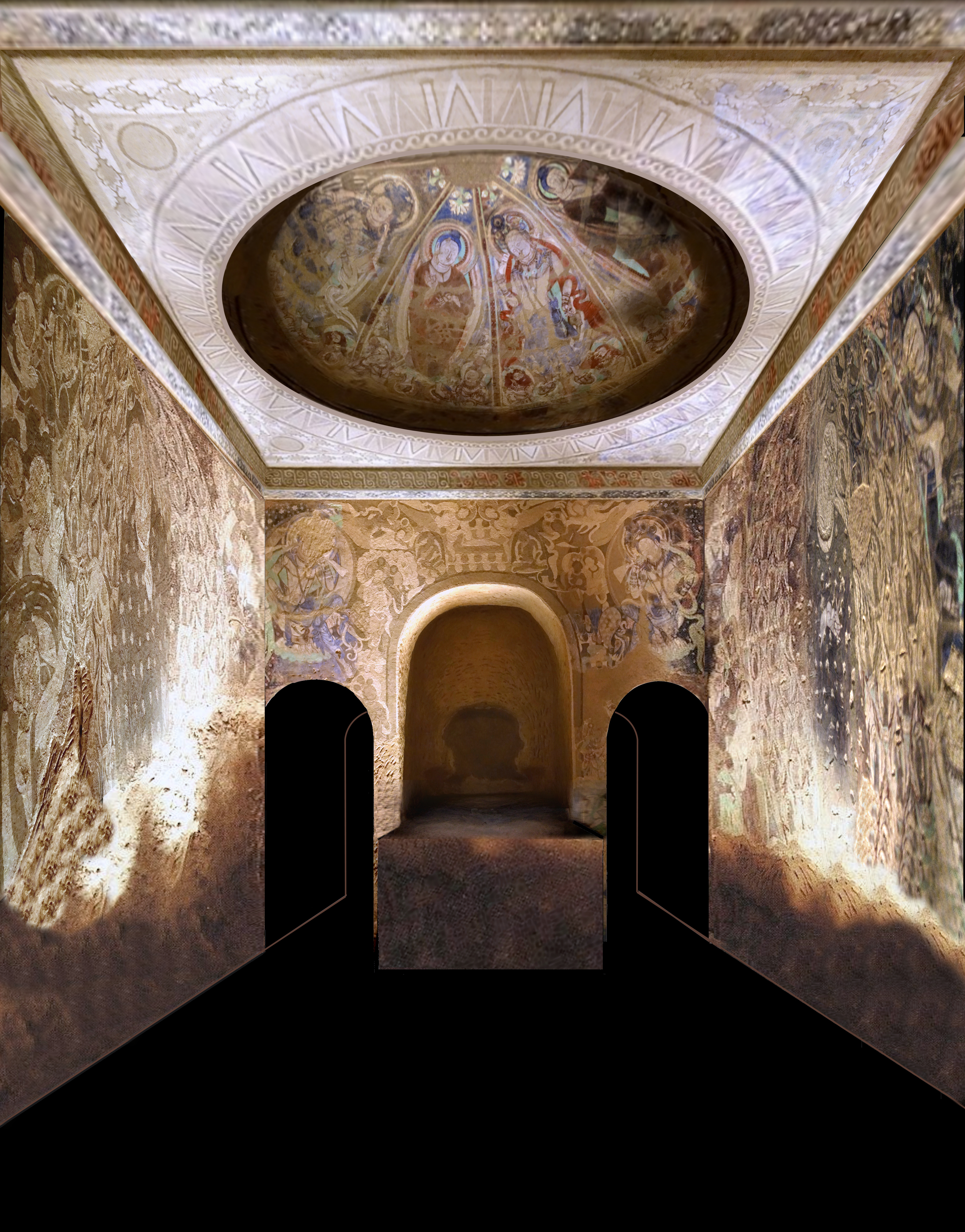
The Buddhist Cave of the Ring-Bearing Doves (Cave 123) at the Kizil Caves near Kucha, built c. 430–530 AD

From the 3rd century AD, the Tarim Basin became a centre for the development of Buddhist art, and a major relay for the Silk Road transmission of Buddhism. Buddhist texts were translated into Chinese by Kuchean monks, the most famous of whom was Kumārajīva (344–412/5).

=== Indian and Central Asian influences ===
Numerous Buddhist caves cover the northern side of the Tarim Basin, such as the Kizil Caves consisting in over 236 such temples. Their murals date from the 3rd to the 8th century. The caves of Kizil are the earlier of their type in China, and their model was later adopted in the construction of Buddhist caves further east. Other famous sites nearby are the Kizilgaha Caves, the Kumtura Caves, Subashi Temple or the Simsim Caves.

In the Kizil Caves appear portraits of Royal families, composed of the King, Queen and young Prince. They are accompanied by monks, and men in caftan.

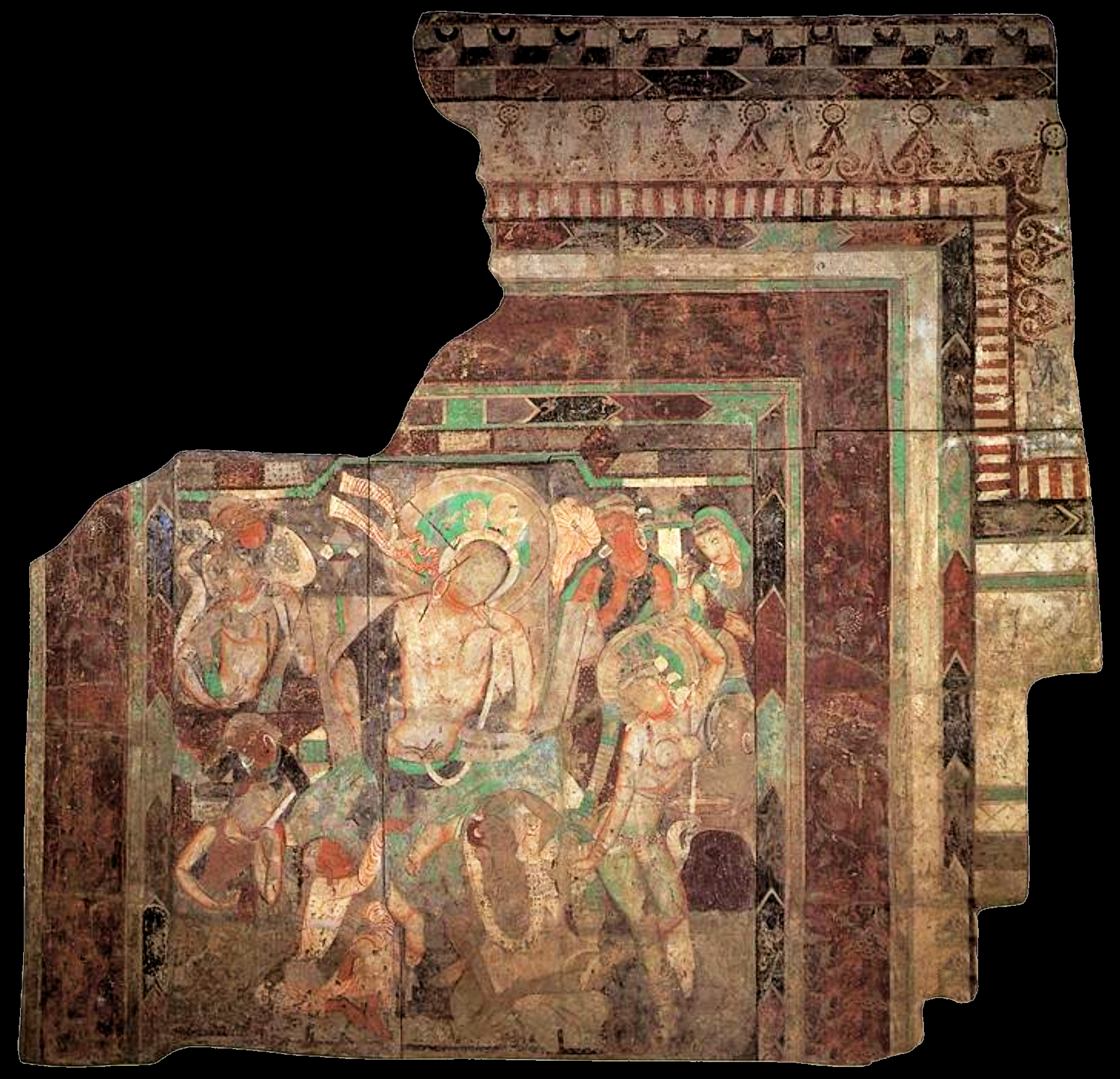
The mural, "Dance of princess Chandraprabha", with frames probably derived from Roman art of the 1st century AD. Treasure Cave C (Cave 83). MIK III 8443.

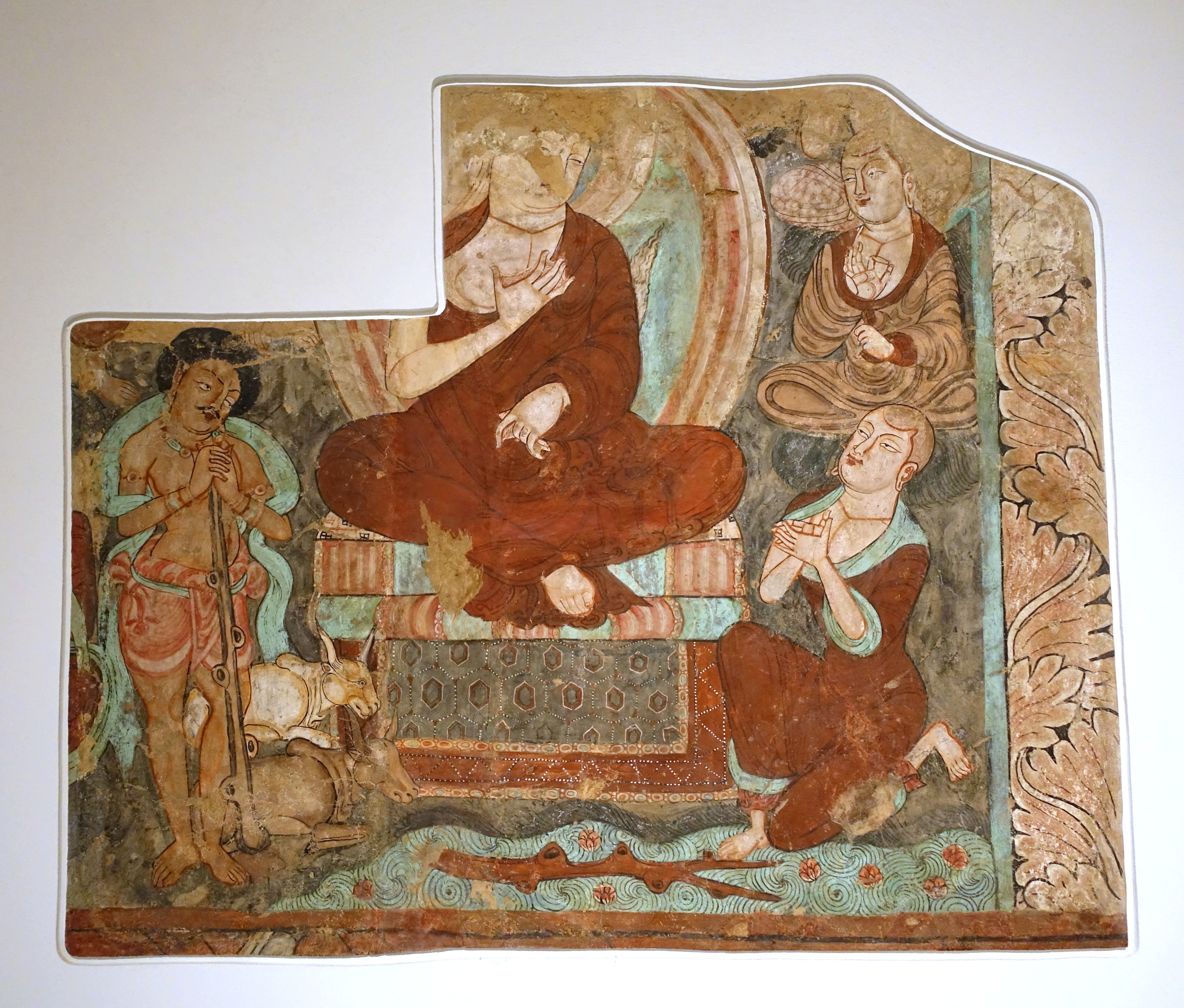
Painting of a cowherd listening to a sermon of the Buddha, from the right wall of the main hall. Cave of the Statues. 14C date: 406-425 AD.

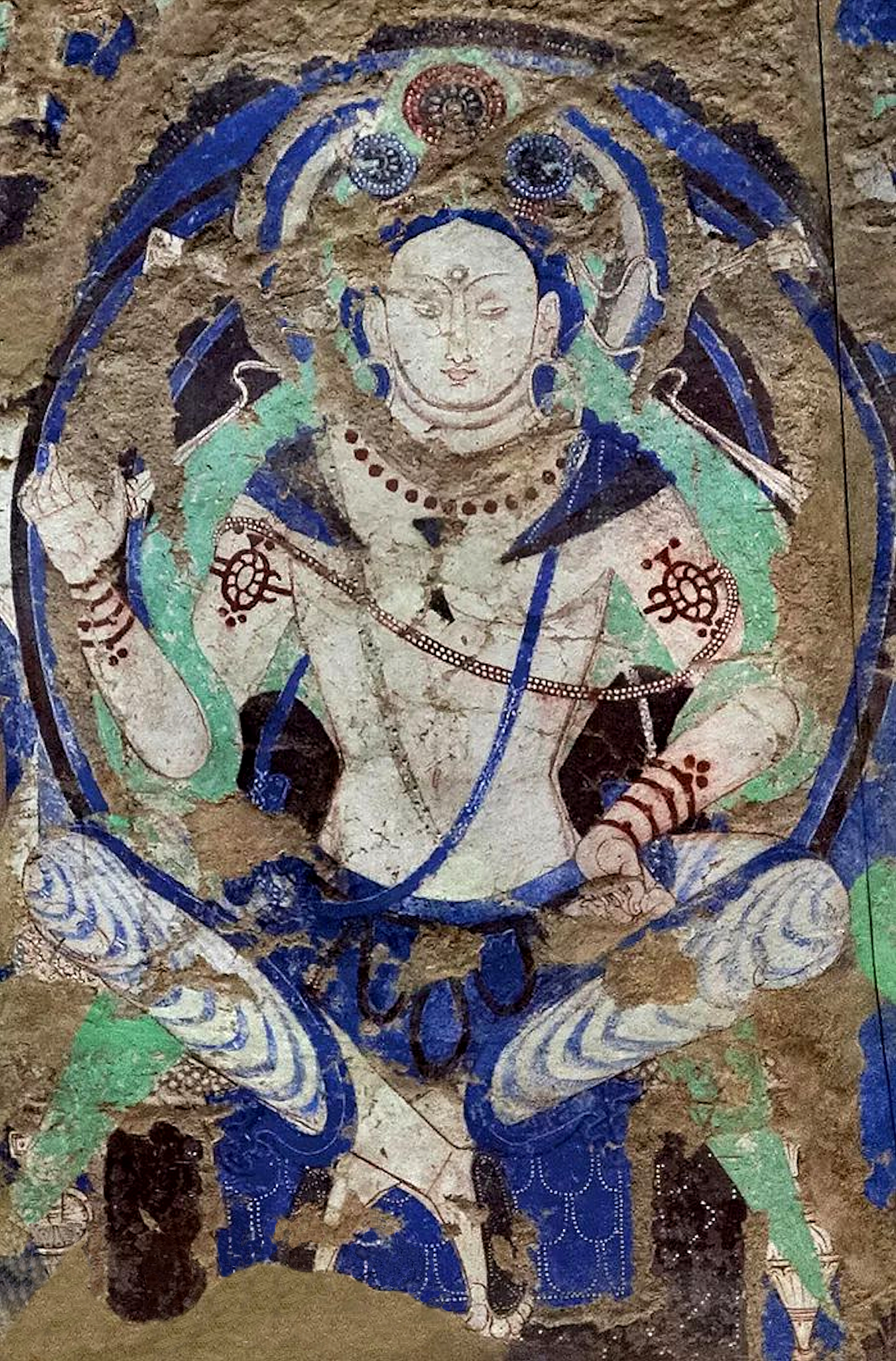
Maitreya in the lunette over the entrance of Maya Cave, 224, Kizil Caves. Dahlem Museum

=== Interaction with Chinese art ===
The influence of Chinese art started to appear in the eastern part of the Tarim Basin, as Buddhist art was spreading eastward. These Chinese characteristics appear in the art of the Bezeklik Caves or the Dunhuang Caves.

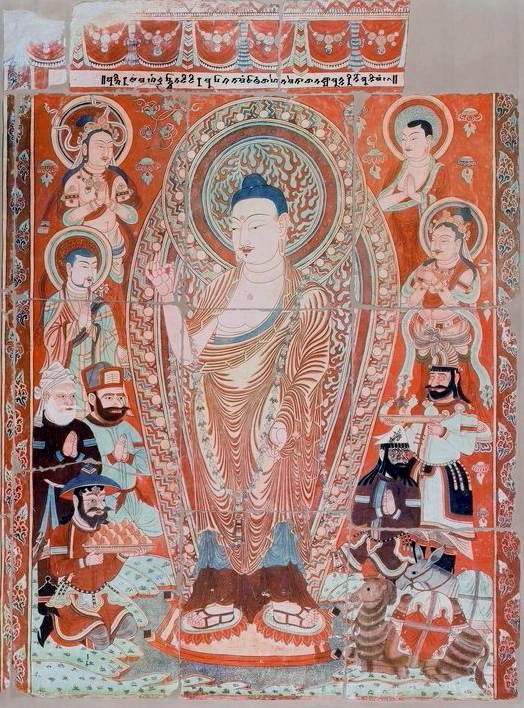
Praṇidhi scene, temple 9 (Cave 20), including Sogdian merchants. Bezeklik Caves.

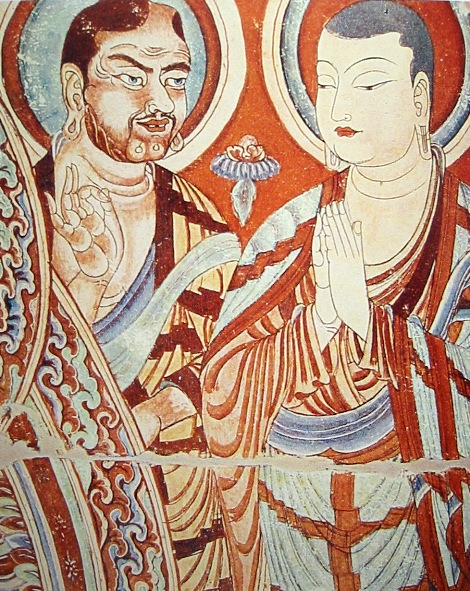
Details from Praṇidhi scene No. 5. Central Asian and Asian Buddhist monks.

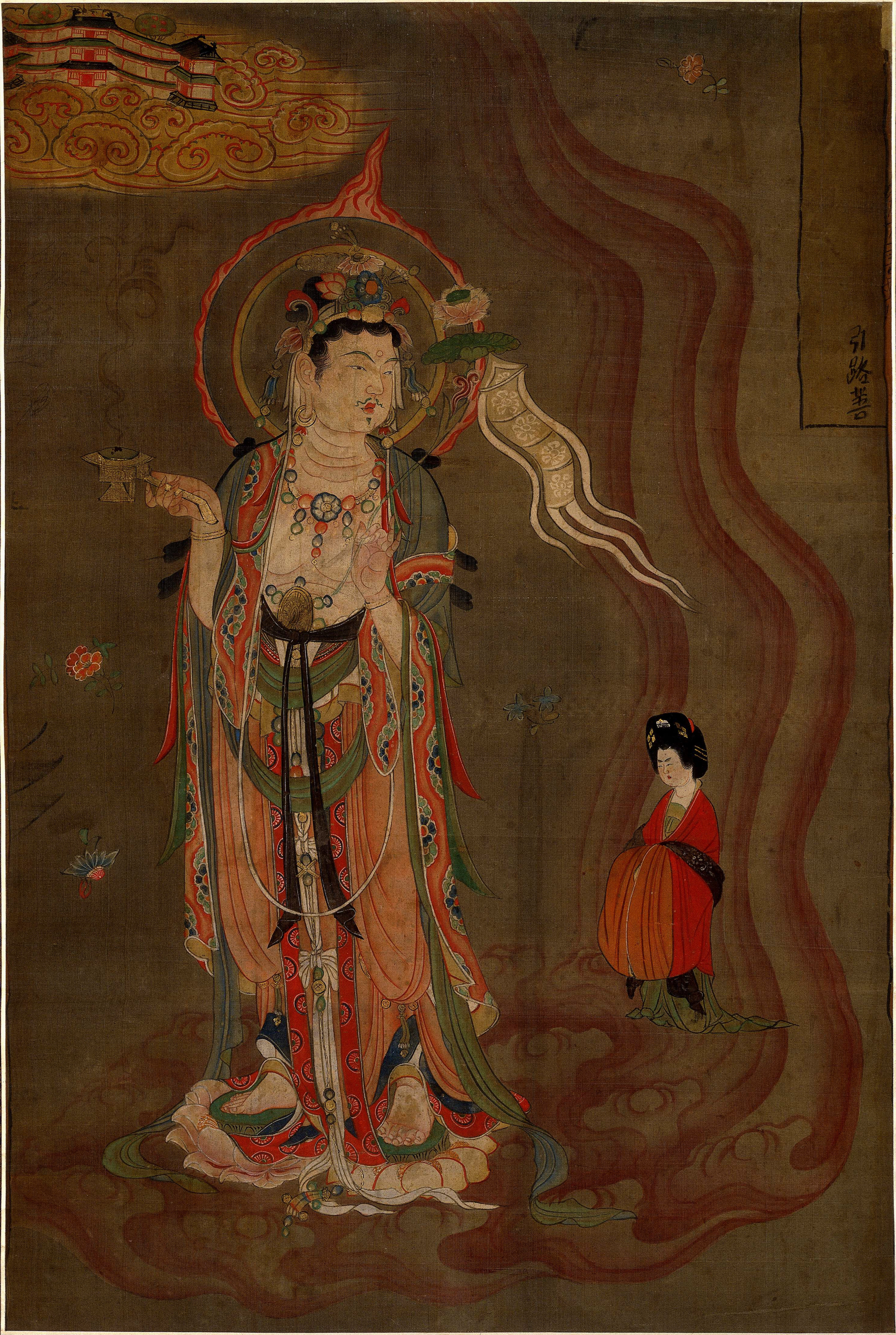
Bodhisattva leading a lady donor towards the Pure Lands. Painting on silk (Library Cave), Late Tang. Mogao Caves

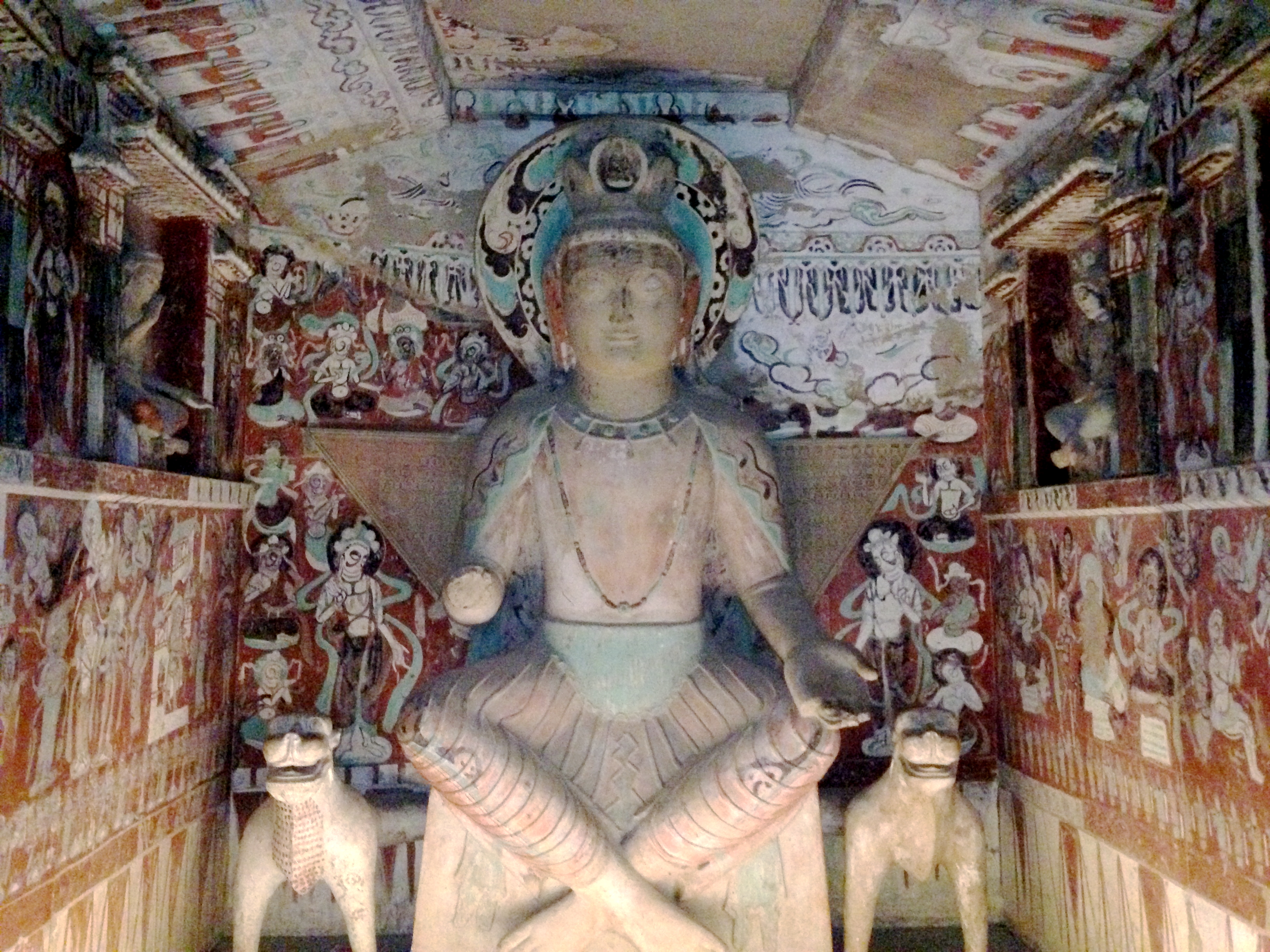
Figure of Maitreya Buddha in cave 275 from Northern Liang (397–439), one of the earliest caves. The crossed ankle figure with a three-disk crown shows influence from Kushan art. Mogao Caves

== Sogdian art ==
The Afrasiab paintings of the 6th to 7th centuries in Samarkand, Uzbekistan offer a rare surviving example of Sogdian art. The paintings, showing scenes of daily life and events such as the arrival of foreign ambassadors, are located within the ruins of aristocratic homes. It is unclear if any of these palatial residences served as the official palace of the rulers of Samarkand. The oldest surviving Sogdian monumental wall murals date to the 5th century and are the Penjikent murals, Tajikistan. In addition to revealing aspects of their social and political lives, Sogdian art has also been instrumental in aiding historians' understanding of their religious beliefs. For instance, it is clear that Buddhist Sogdians incorporated some of their own Iranian deities into their version of the Buddhist Pantheon. At Zhetysu, Sogdian gilded bronze plaques on a Buddhist temple show a pairing of a male and female deity with outstretched hands holding a miniature camel, a common non-Buddhist image similarly found in the paintings of Samarkand and Panjakent.

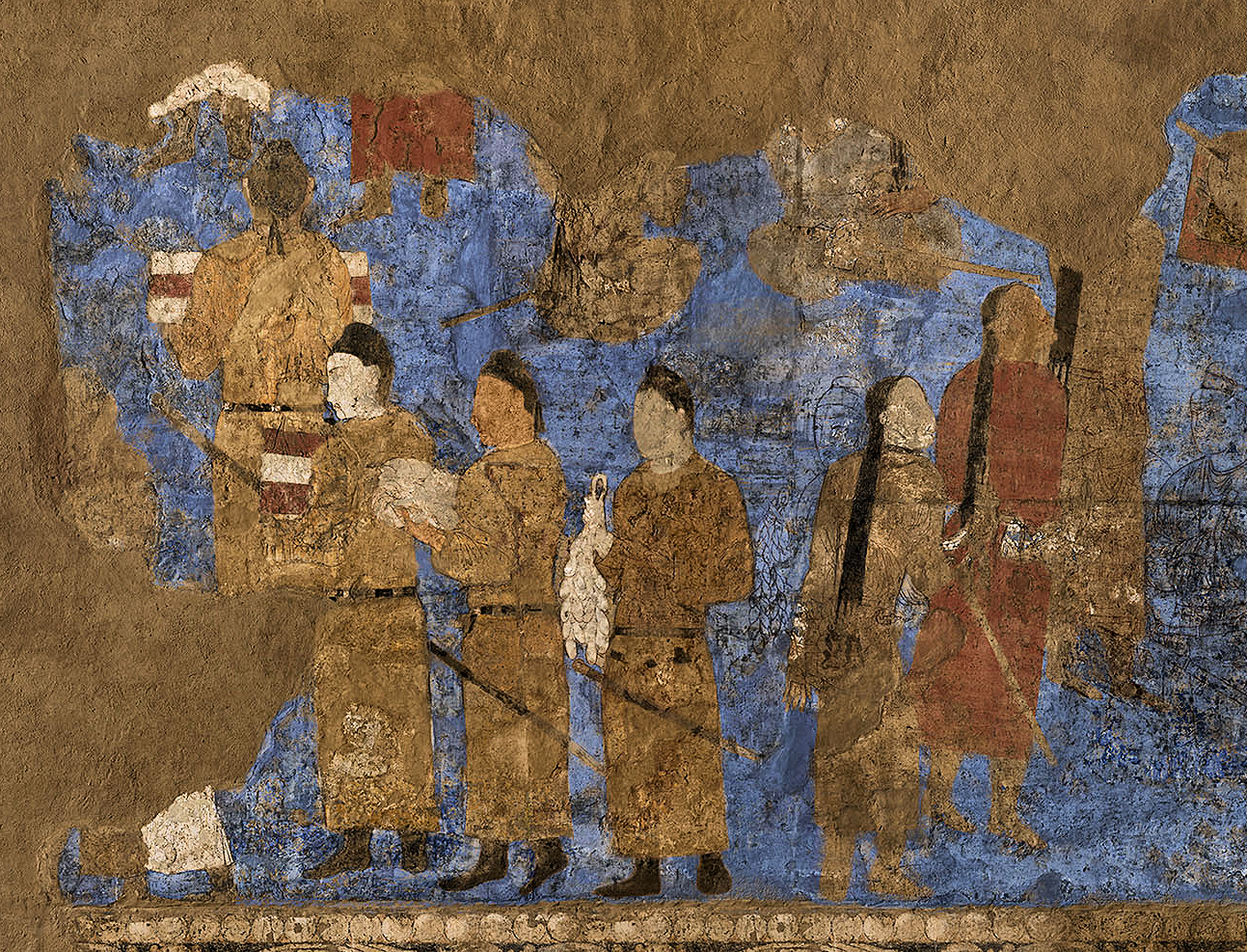
Afrasyab Chinese Embassy (left), carrying silk and a string of silkworm cocoons, and Turkish delegates (right), recognizable by their long plaits.

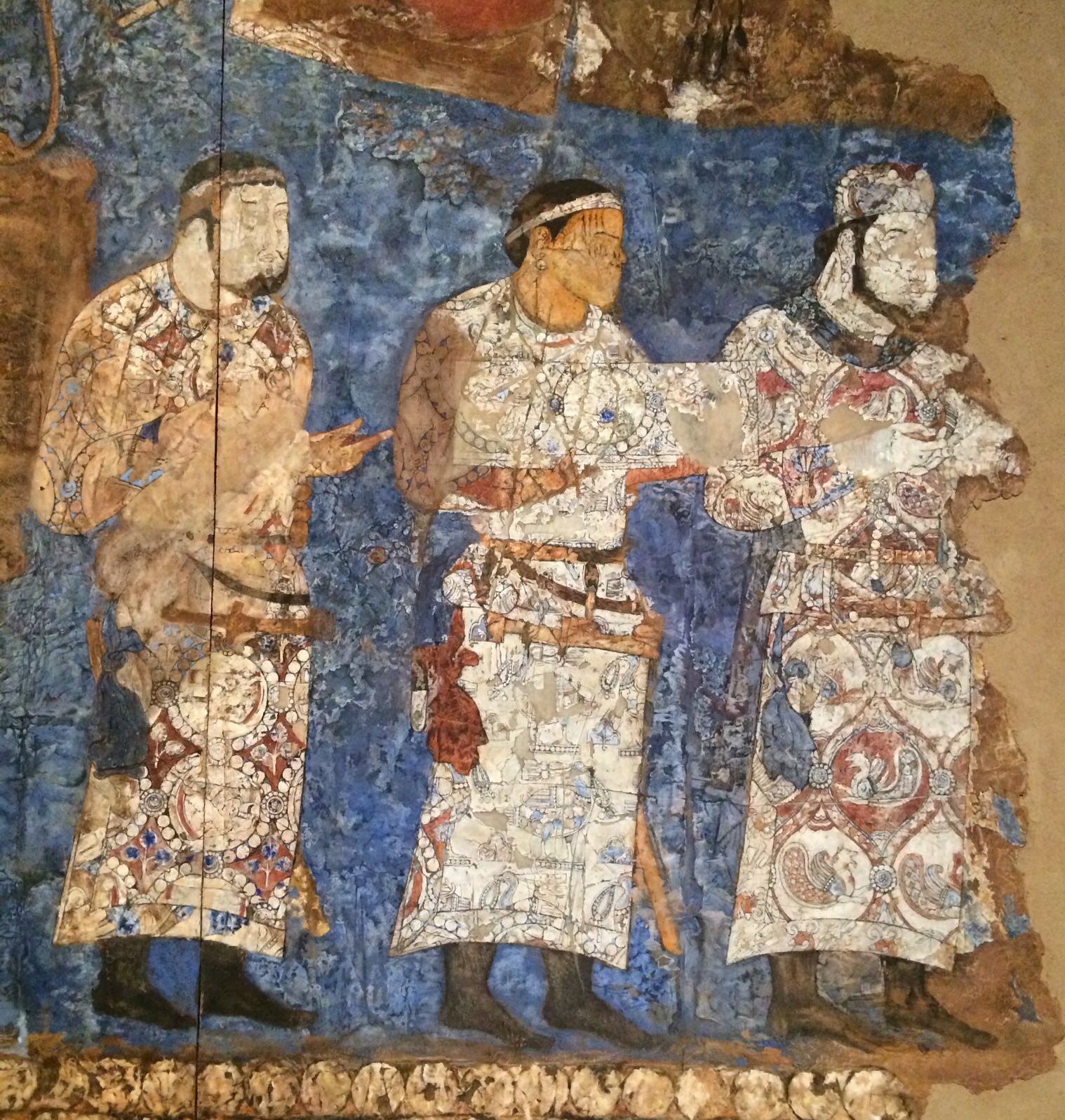
Ambassadors from Chaganian (central figure, inscription of the neck), and Chach (modern Tashkent) to king Varkhuman of Samarkand. 648-651 AD, Afrasiyab murals, Samarkand. The delegate to the right has a Simurgh design on his dress.

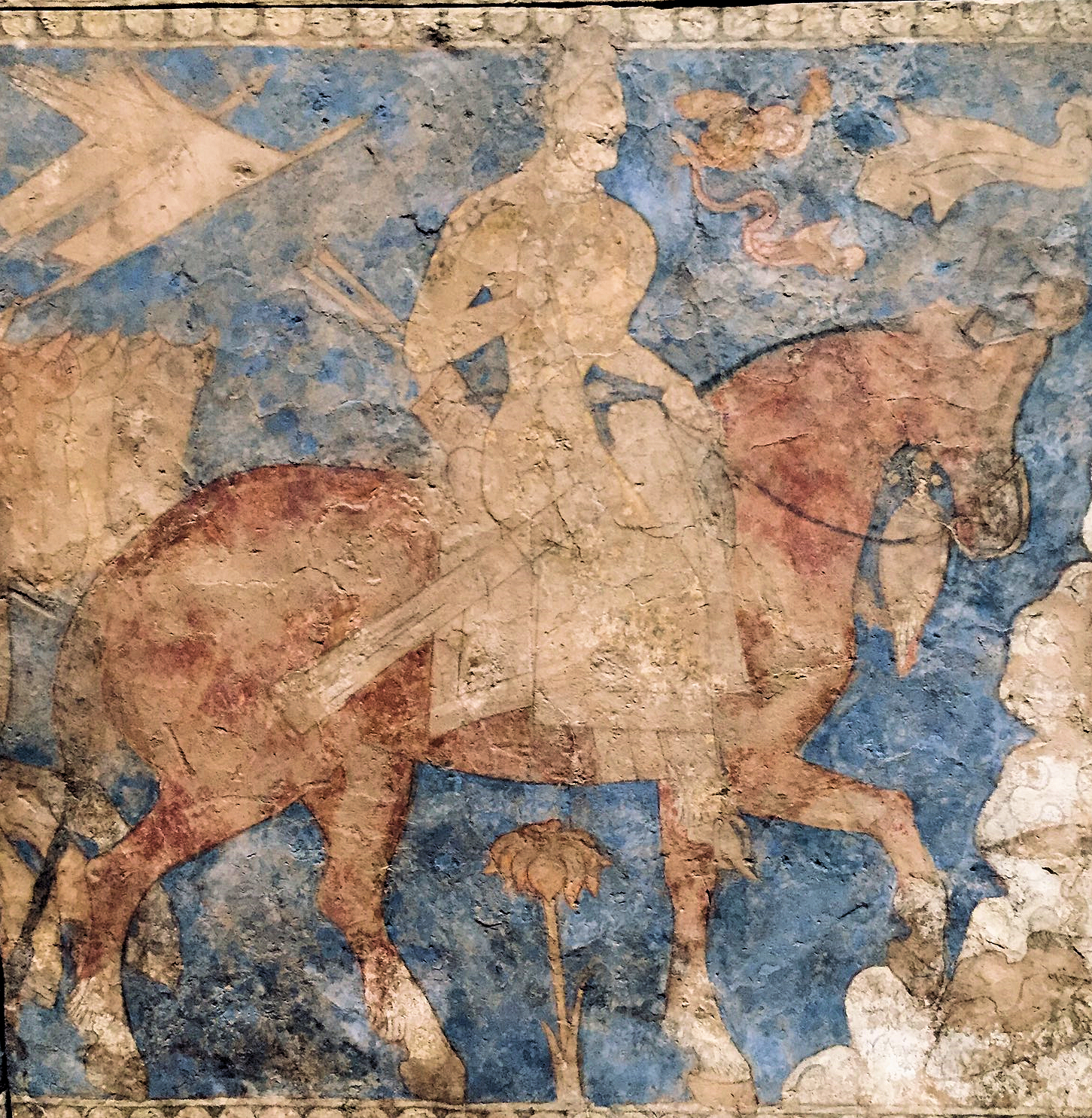
Rostam, with an elongated skull, Penjikent murals

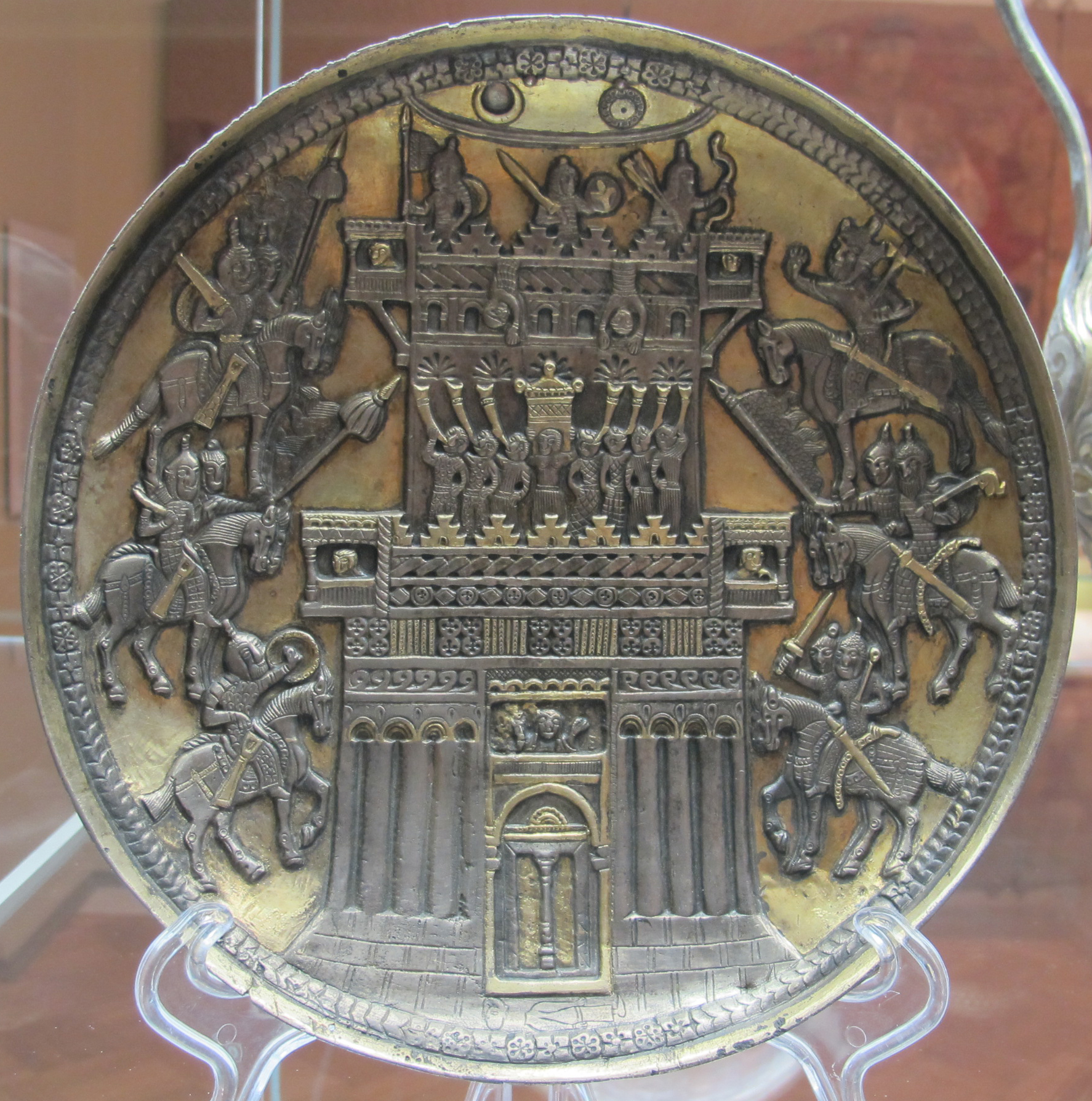
The Anikova dish: a Nestorian Christian plate with decoration of a besieged Jericho, by Sogdian artists under Karluk dominion, Semirechye. 9th-10th century, derived form 8th century material related to Penjikent.

== Central Asian art in ancient China ==
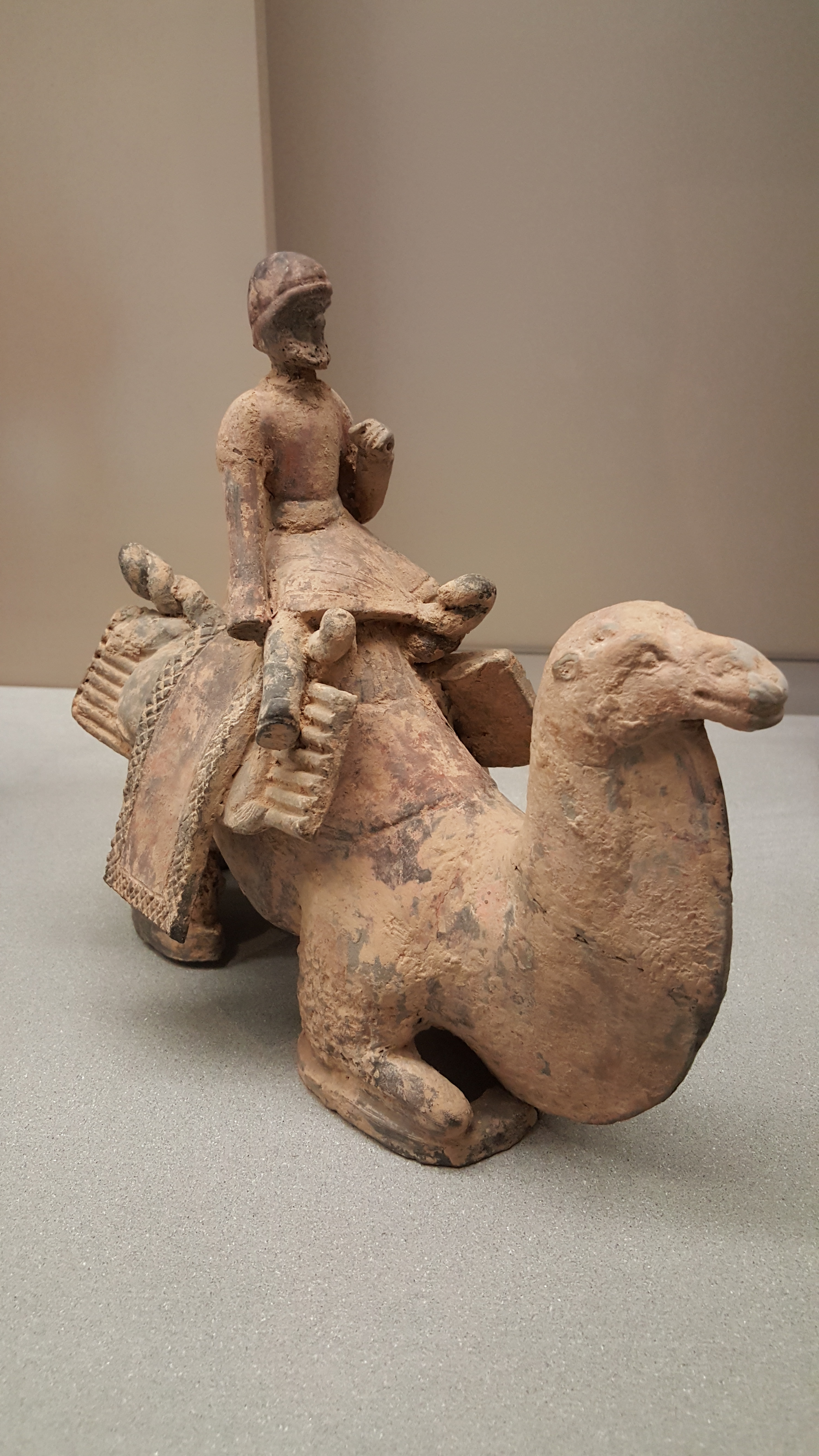
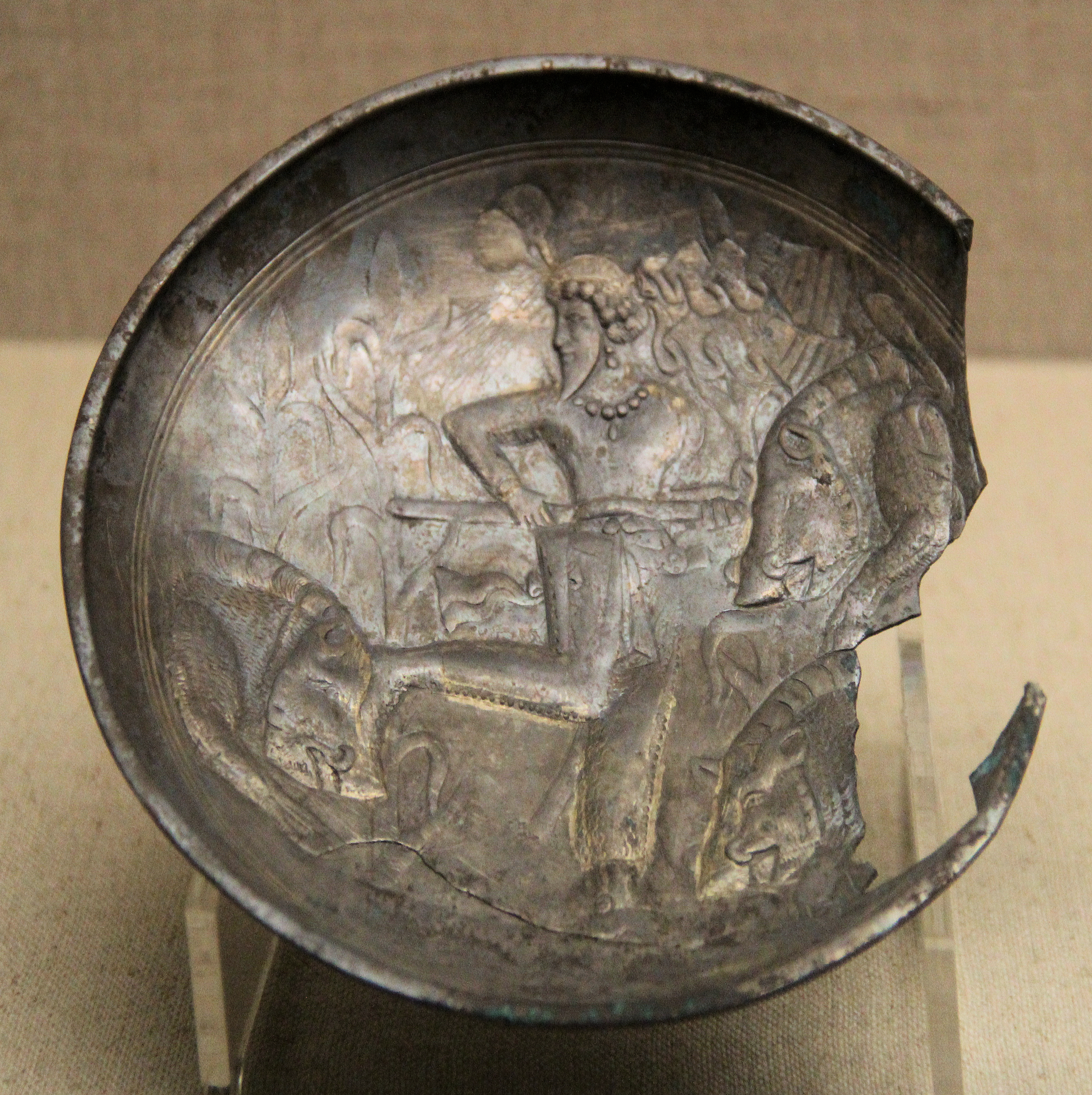
Many objects suggesting exchanges with Central Asia have been found, especially in Northern Wei tombs. Left: Model of a Silk Road camel driver, Northern Wei period. Right: a Kushano-Sasanian plate with hunting scene, from the Northern Wei tomb of Feng Hetu (封和突, a Xianbei military official, 438–501) in Xiaozhan village, Datong. Shanxi Museum.

From the 4th to the 6th centuries AD, the Northern dynasties (389–589 AD) of China, ruled by the nomadic Xianbei, engaged in trade with Central Asia, often through the intermediary of Sogdian traders. Northern Wei art came under influence of Indian and Central Asian traditions through the mean of these trade routes. This included the influence of Buddhism, which flourished under the Northern dynasties. Numerous Central Asian works of art, especially decorated silverware and jewelry, have been found in the tombs of the Northern Wei, the Northern Qi or the Northern Zhou.

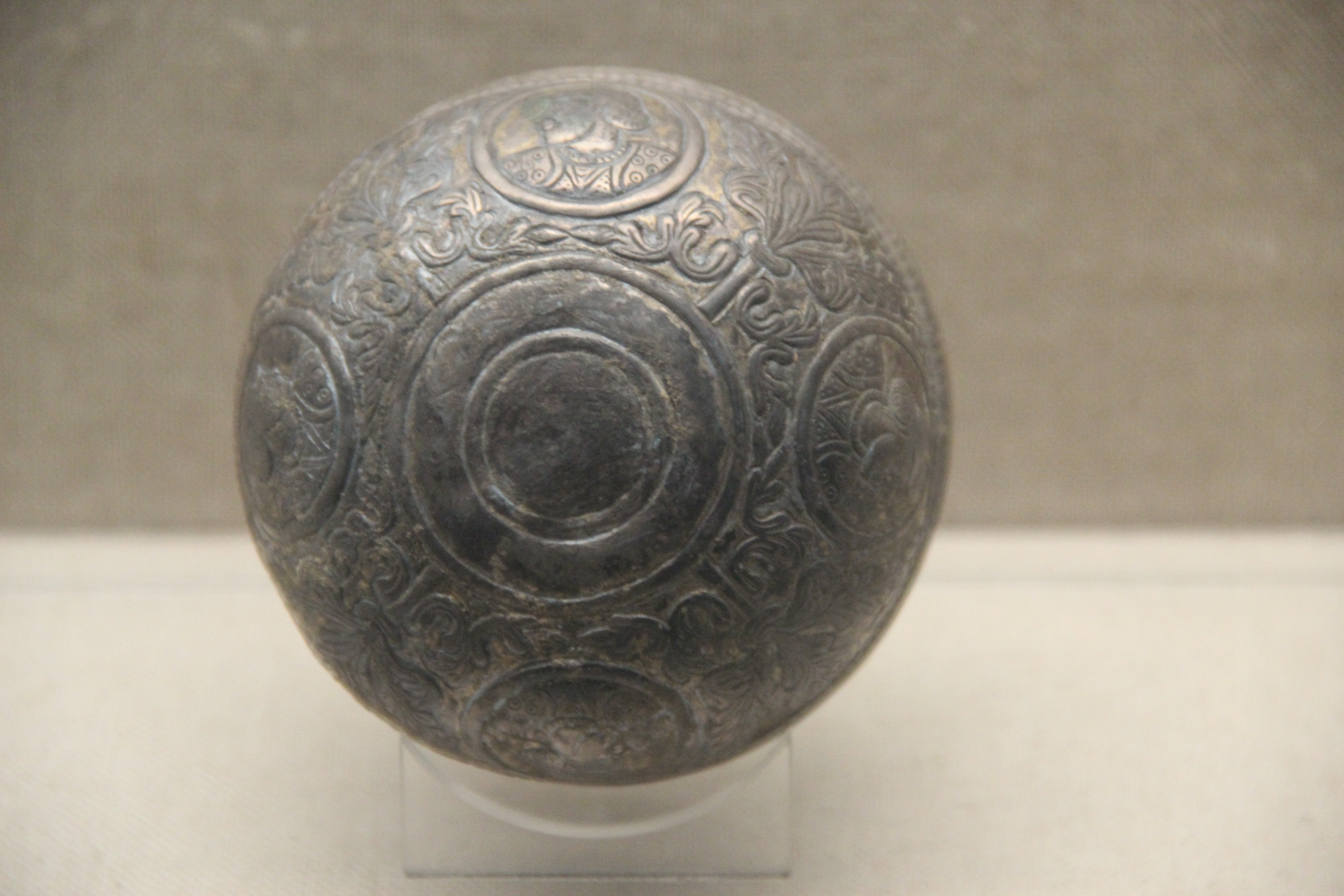
Gilt silver bowl from Bactria, Northern Wei tomb (439-534 AD).

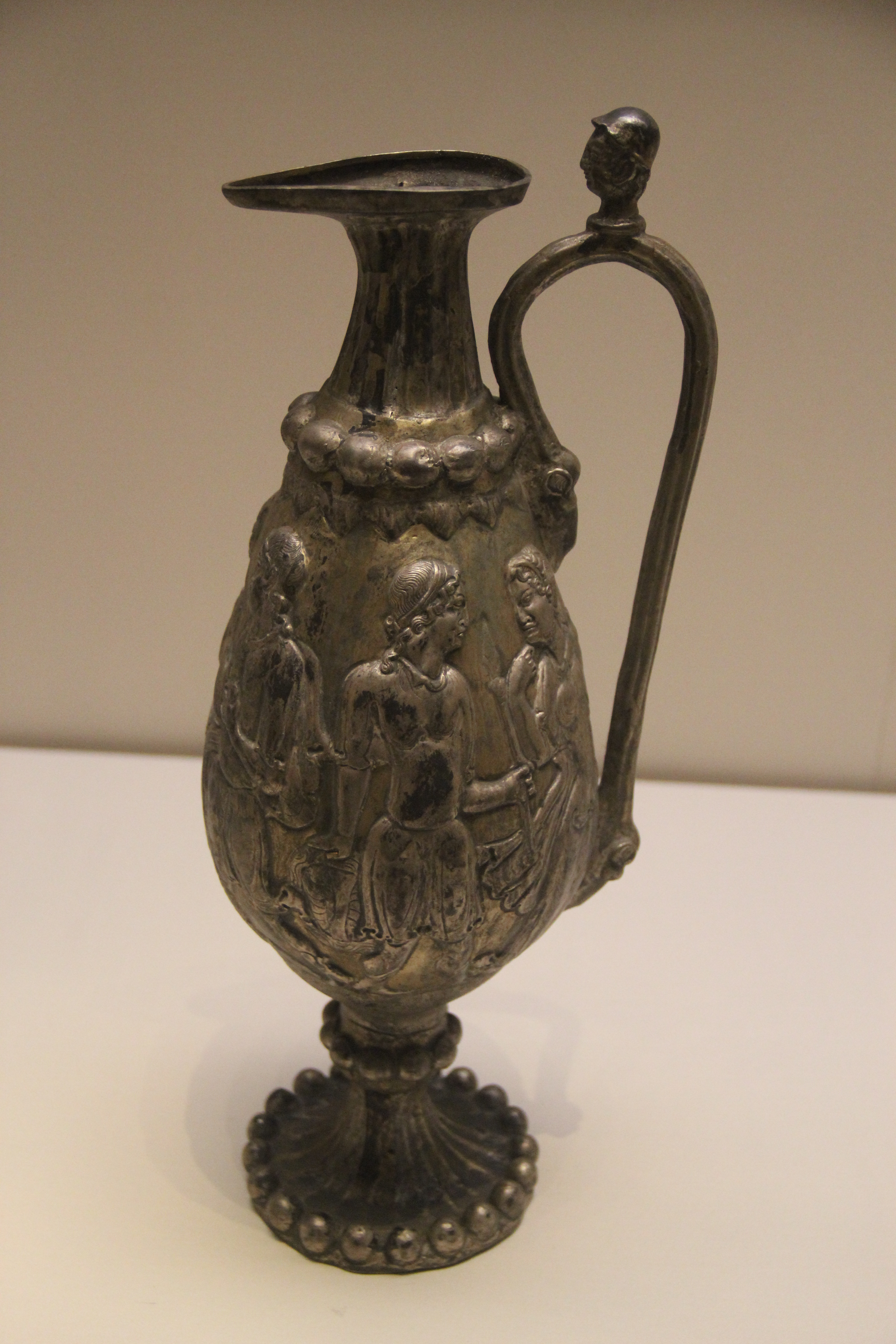
A ewer with Greco-Roman scenes from the tomb of Northern Zhou general Li Xian, 569 AD. It was probably made in Bactria.

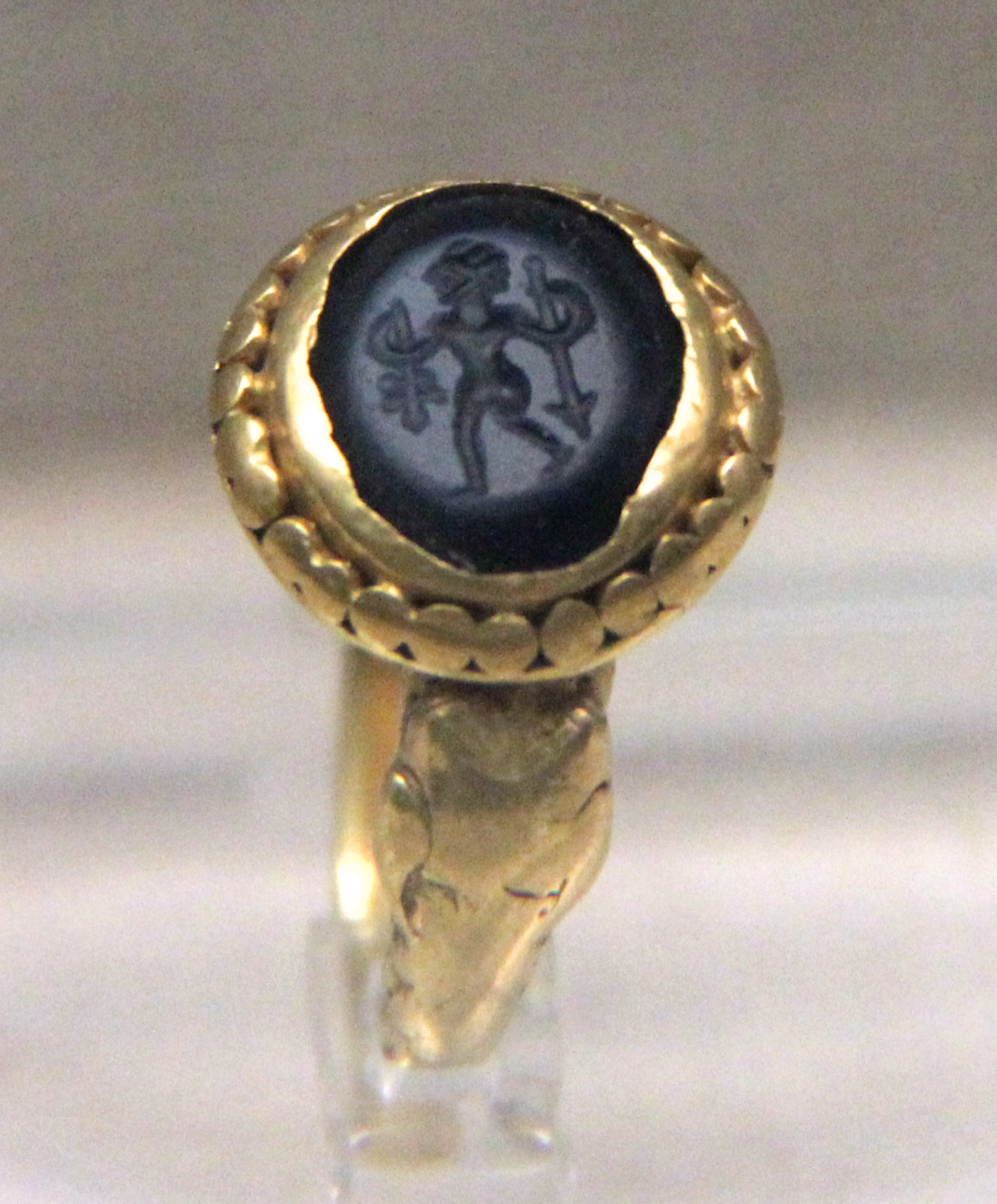
Gem-inlaid gold ring of Central Asian design, tomb of Xu Xianxiu, 571 AD.

== Turkic art ==
The Gokturks destroyed the Rouran Khaganate and overran the Hephthalite Empire to became the main power in Central Asia from the time of the First Turkic Khaganate and the Western Turks, circa 560 to 742 AD. Several later Turkic-speaking empires would later develop, founded by unrelated tribes.

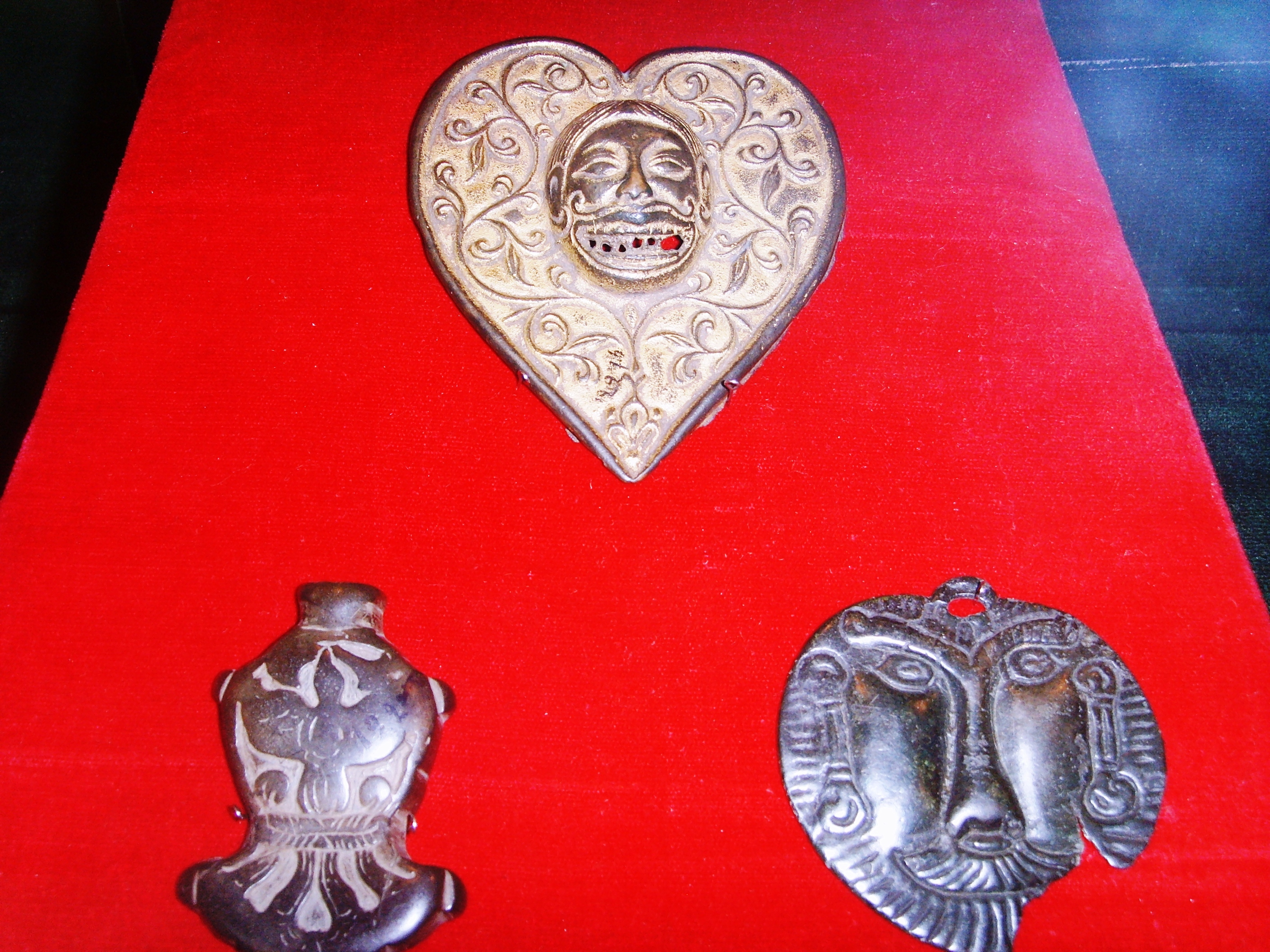
Silver artifacts from Khakassia, associated wjth the Yenisei Kyrgyz people.

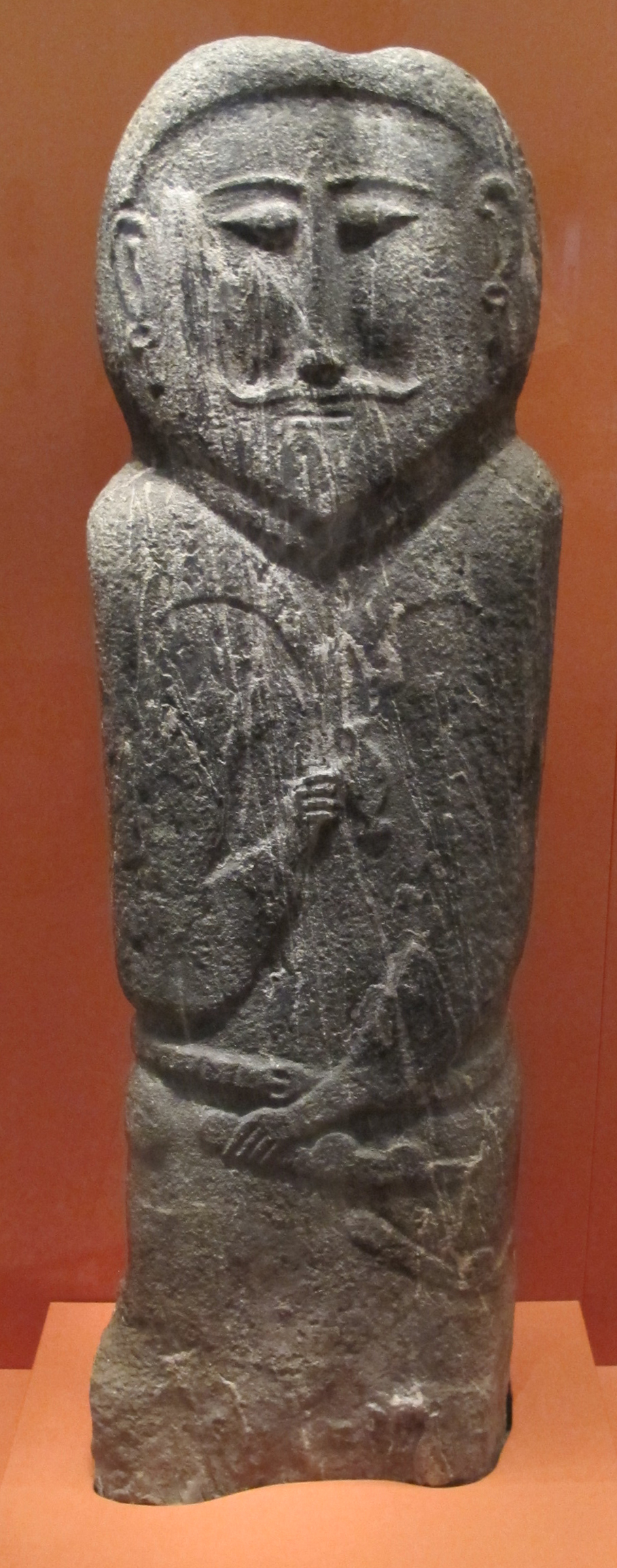
Warrior statue; 8th–10th century; from the Kosh-Agach region (Altai); Hermitage (Sankt Petersburg, Russia)

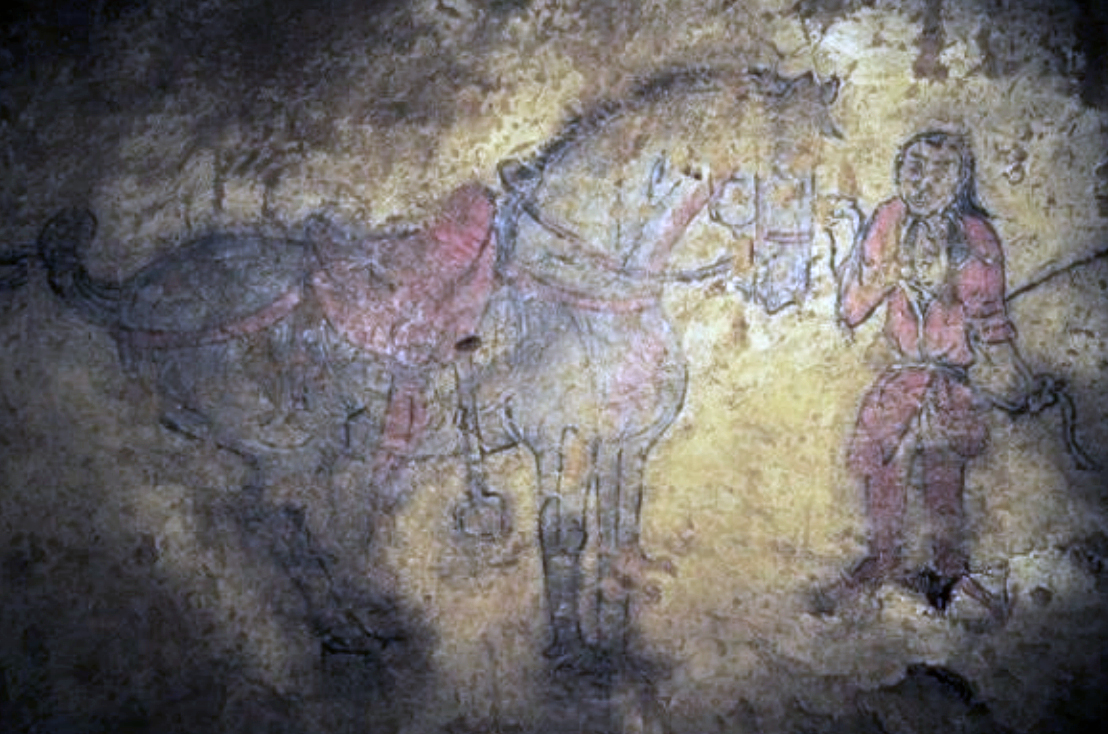
Shoroon Bumbagar tomb mural, Göktürk, 7th century CE.

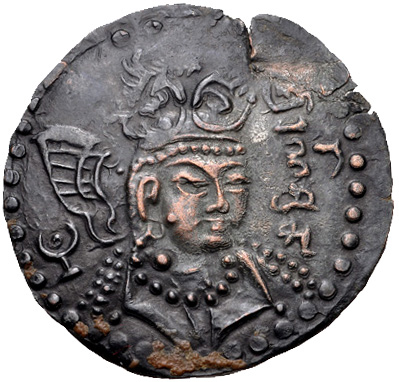
An early Turk Shahi ruler named Sri Ranasrikari "The Lord who brings excellence through war" (Brahmi script). In this realistic portrait, he wears the Turkic double-lapel caftan. Late 7th to early 8th century AD.

== Islamic Golden Age in Central Asia ==
Main Asian polities c. 800

The Muslim conquest of Transoxiana was the 7th and 8th century conquests, by Umayyad and Abbasid Arabs, of Transoxiana, the land between the Oxus (Amu Darya) and Jaxartes (Syr Darya) rivers, a part of Central Asia that today includes all or parts of Uzbekistan, Tajikistan, Kazakhstan, and Kyrgyzstan. This started a period of prosperity, from the 8th to the 14th century, known as the Islamic Golden Age, which also affected the arts of Central Asia.

=== Arab period (7–8th centuries) ===
Islamic art diffused in Central Asia with the rule of Umayyad and Abbasid Arabs. Buildings following Islamic standard were built throughout the land, such as the Abbasid mosque of Afrasiab in Samarkand circa 750–825 CE.

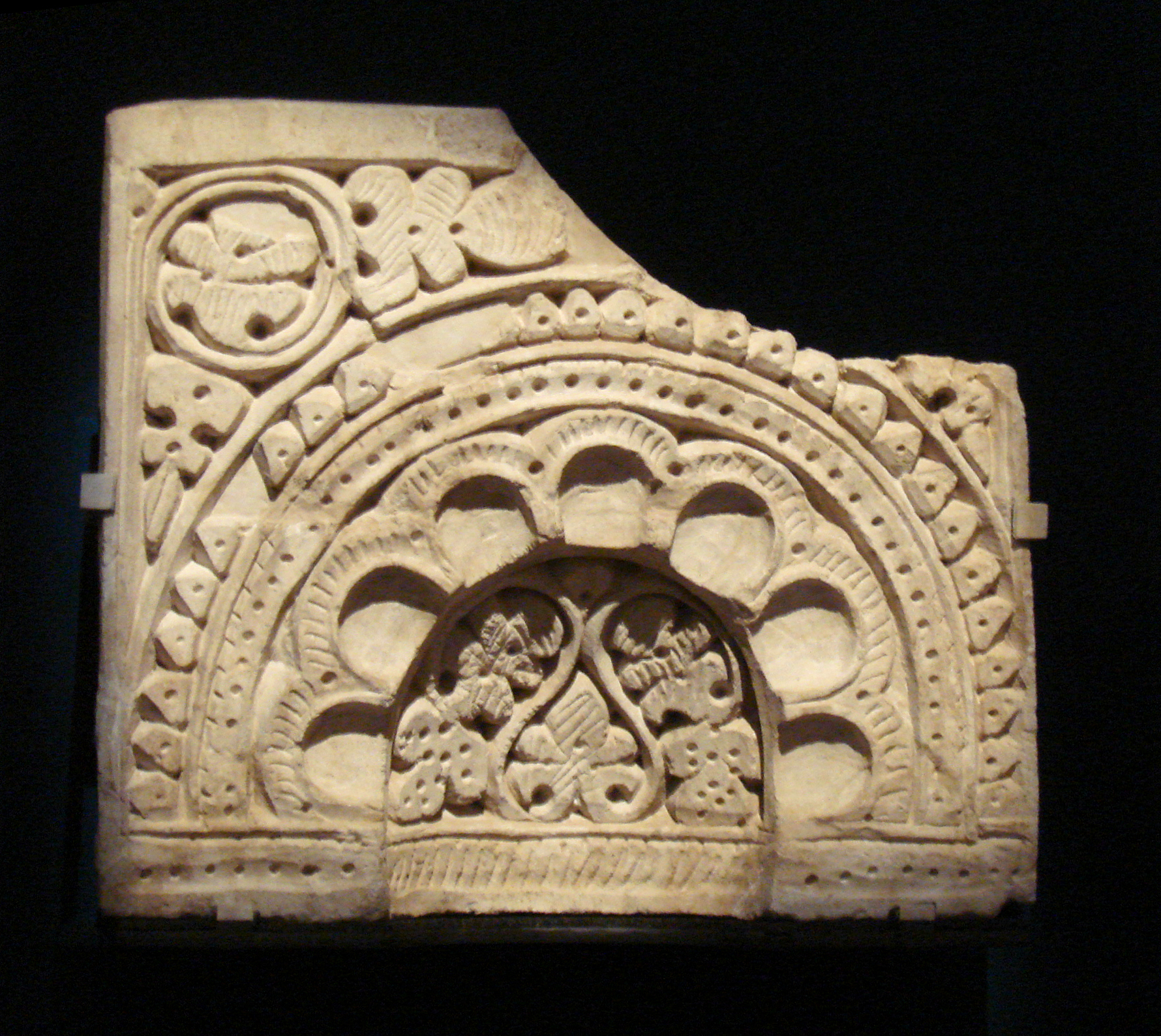
Decorated niche from the Abbasid mosque of Afrasiab, Samarkand, 750-825 CE.

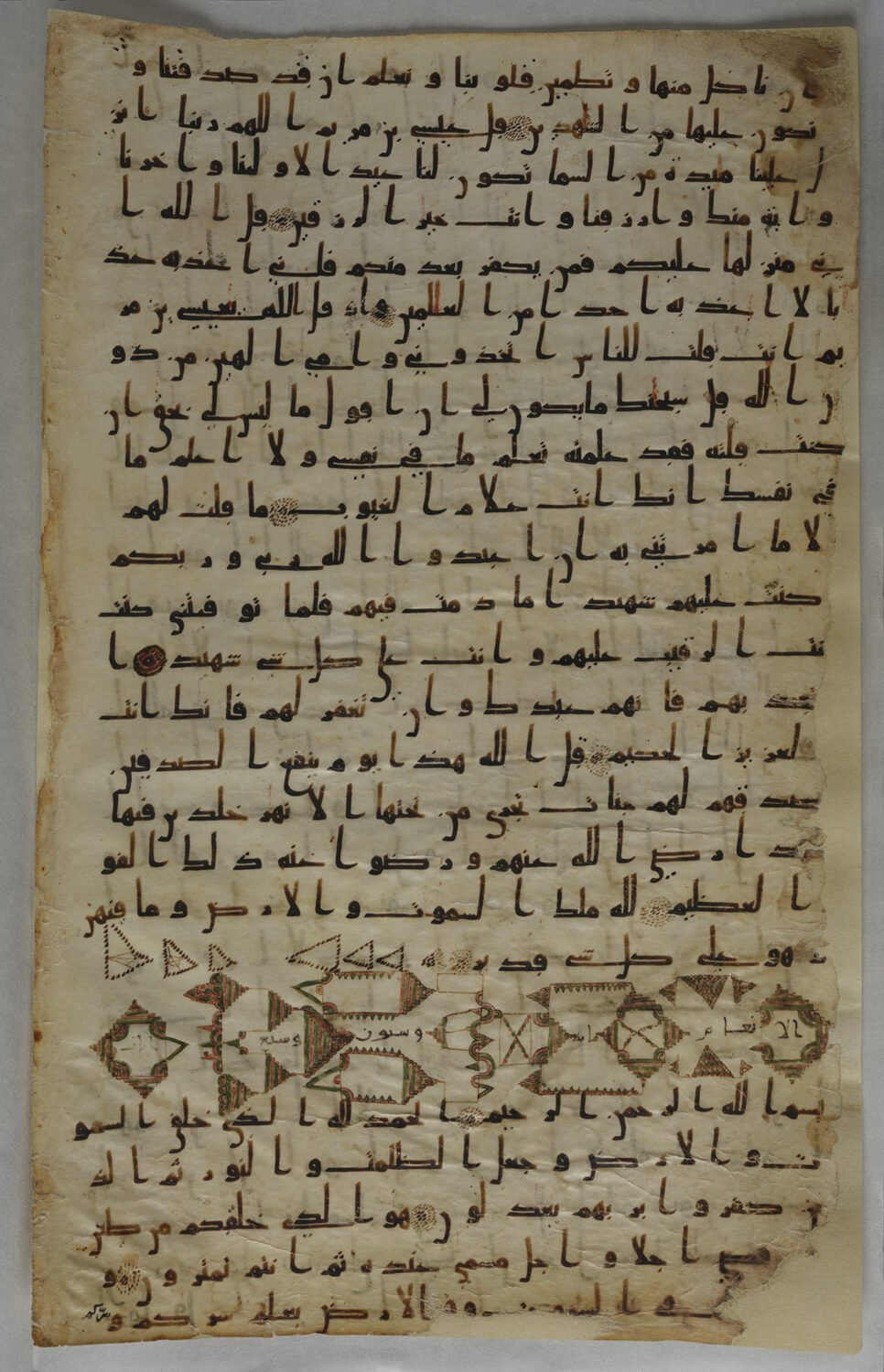
Folio sheet from a Qur'an, found in the sanctuary of Katta Langar, south of Samarkand, first half of the 8th century.

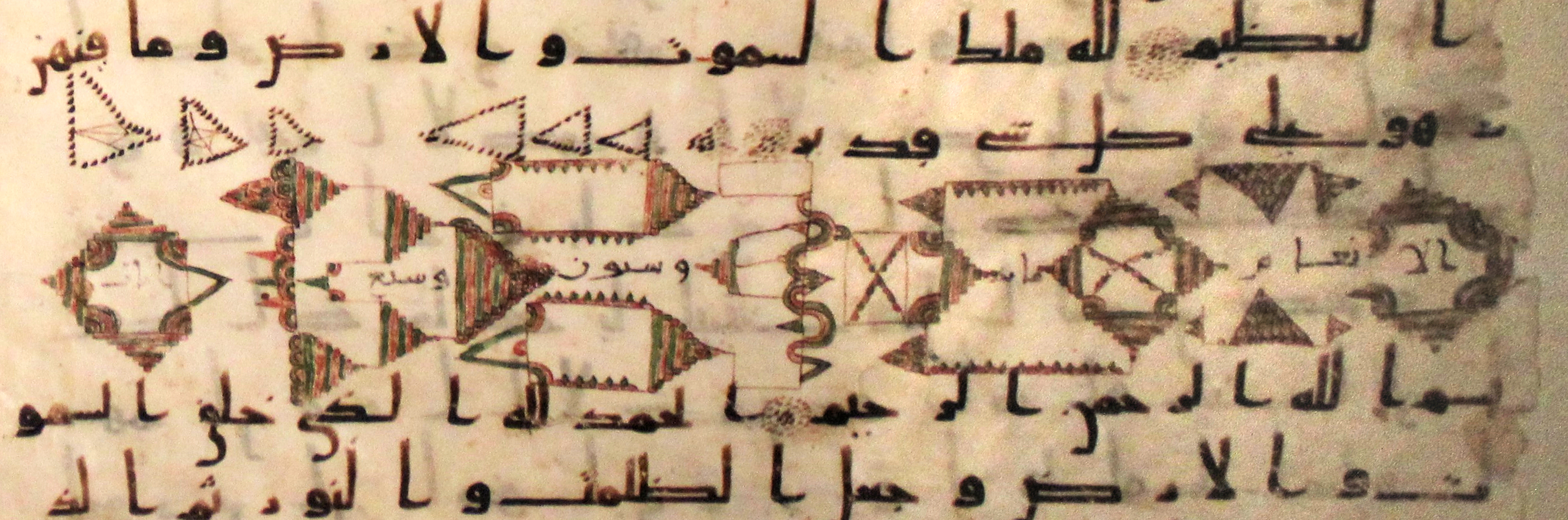
Coran from Katta Langar, decorative band (detail)

=== Iranian Intermezzo (9–10th centuries) ===
Abbasid power finally waned, and local Iranian dynasties were established, creating an Iranian Intermezzo, blending Islamic art with Persian culture, during the 9th and 10th centuries. The Iranian dynasties corresponding to the Iranian Intermezzo are the Tahirids, Saffarids, Sajids, Samanids, Ziyarids, Buyids and Sallarids.

==== Samanids (819–999) ====
Artistic florescence occurred especially during the period of the Samanid Empire (819–999). The empire was centred in Khorasan and Transoxiana; at its greatest extent encompassing modern-day Afghanistan, large parts of Iran, Tajikistan, Turkmenistan, Uzbekistan, Kyrgyzstan, parts of Kazakhstan and Pakistan.

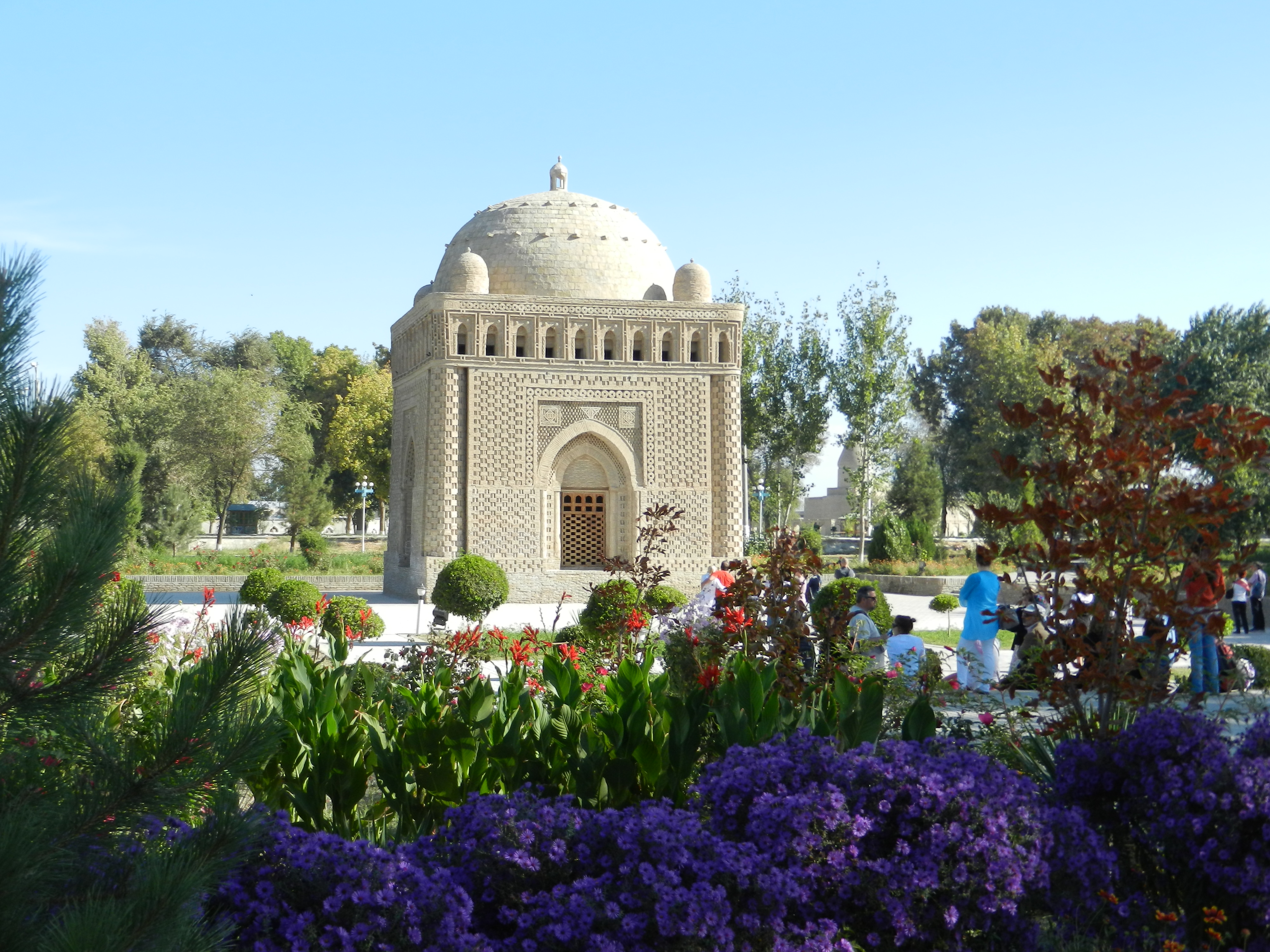
The Samanid Mausoleum, the burial site of Ismail Samani, in Bukhara, 10th century.

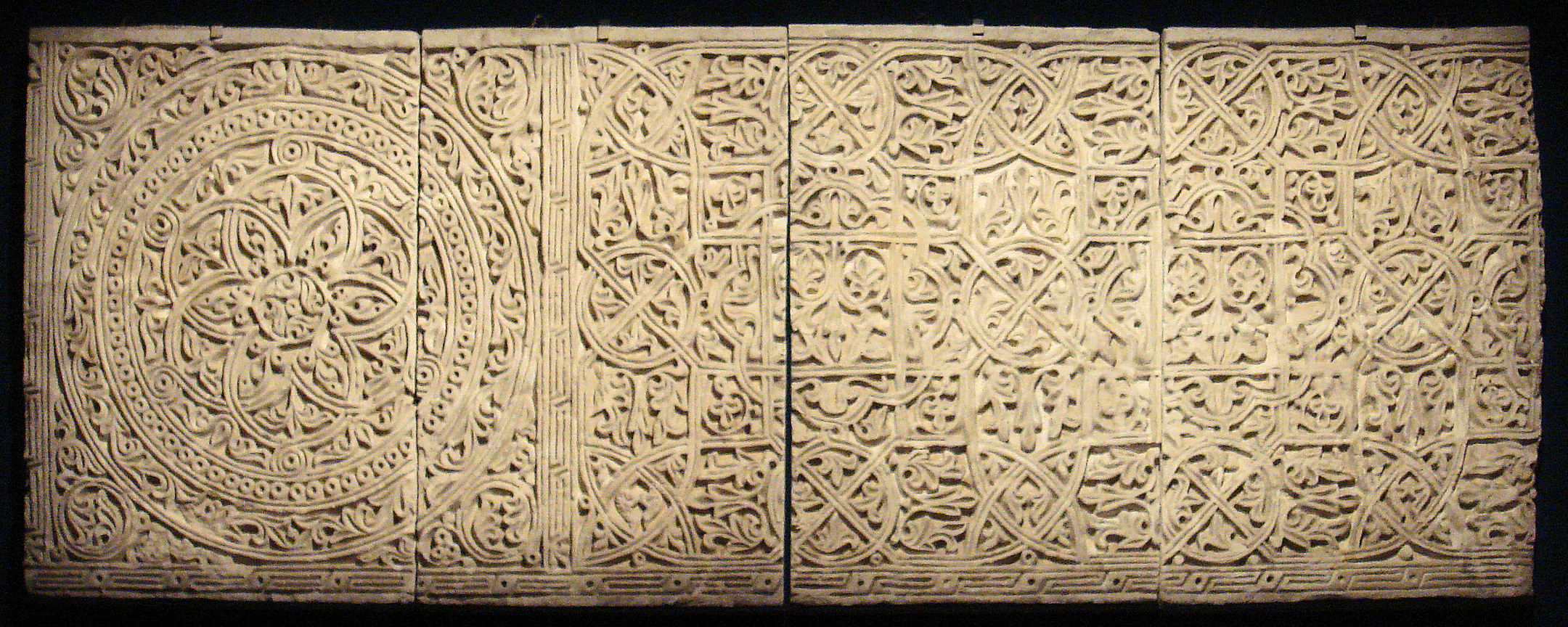
Great decorated panel from a Samanid residential complex, 9th-10th century, Afrasiab, Samarkand.

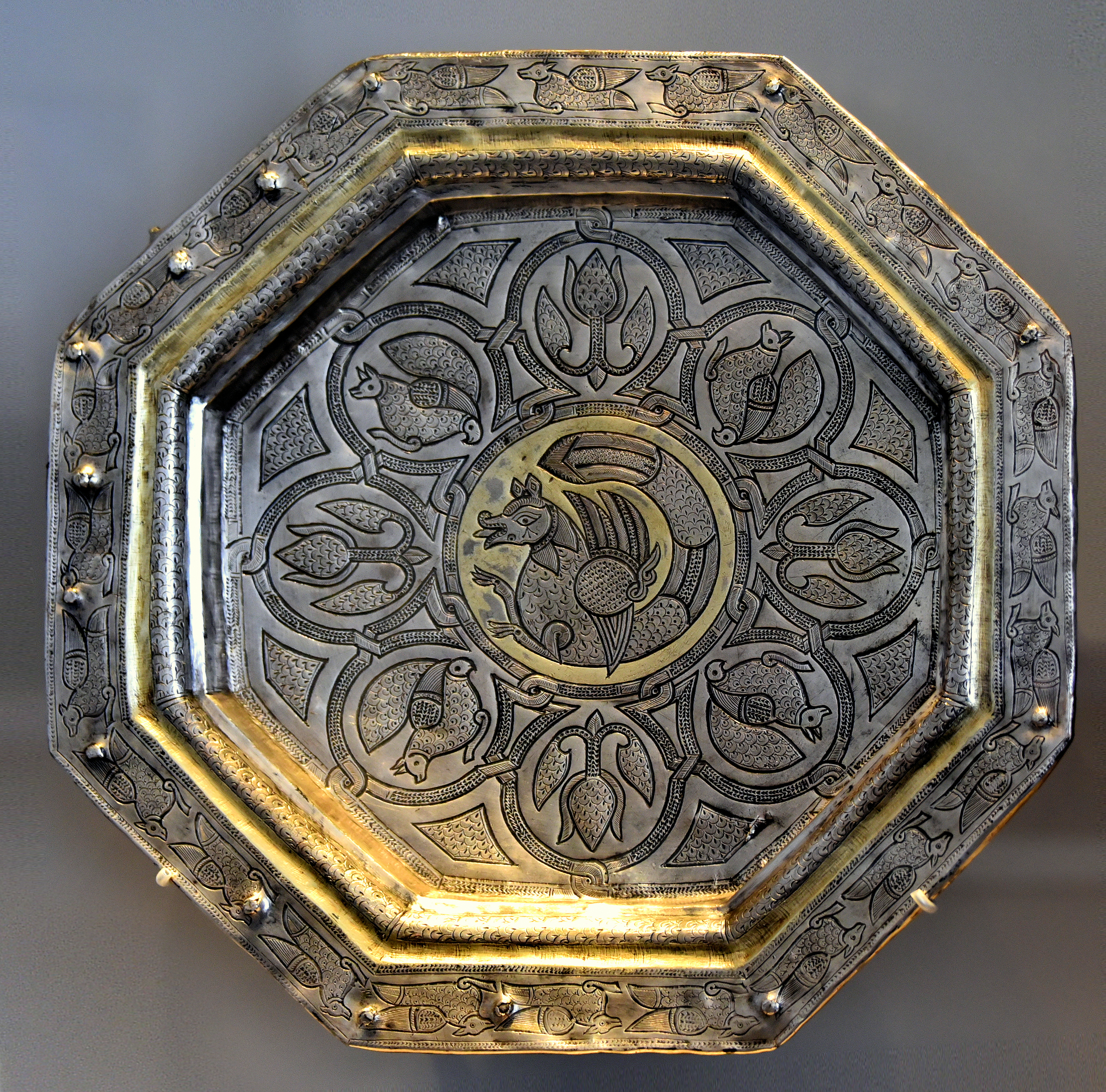
"Simurgh platter", from Iran, Samanids dynasty. 9th-10th century. Islamic Art Museum (Museum für Islamische Kunst), Berlin

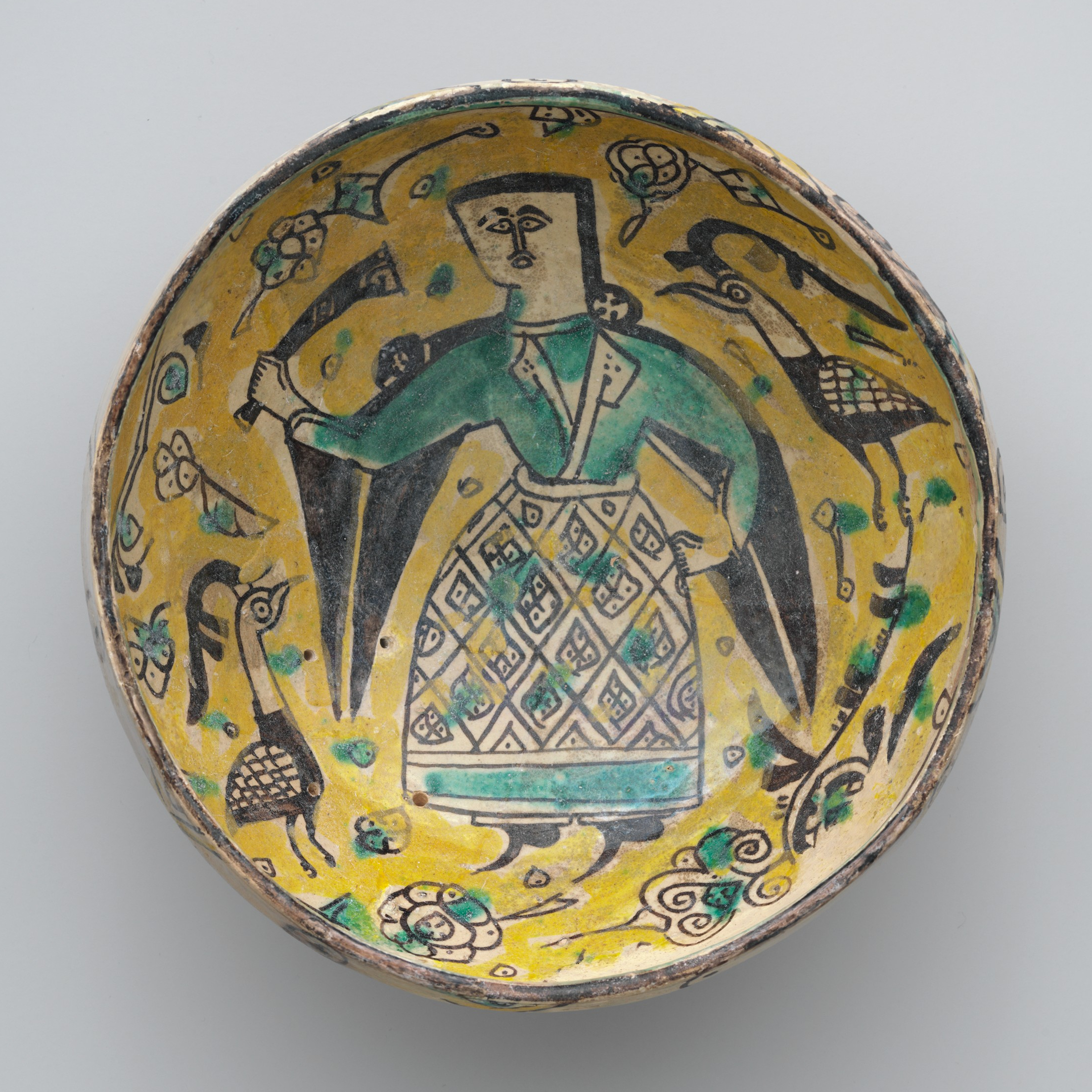
Example of figural earthenware ceramics from Samanid period. From Nishapur, Iran, 10th century CE.

==== Buyids (932–1062) ====
The Būyids, also an Iranian dynasty, became great patrons of art and architecture, as a way to enhance their prestige and to compensate for their humble origins. Through art, they endeavoured to present themselves as the heirs to the pre-Islamic tradition of kingship in Iran.

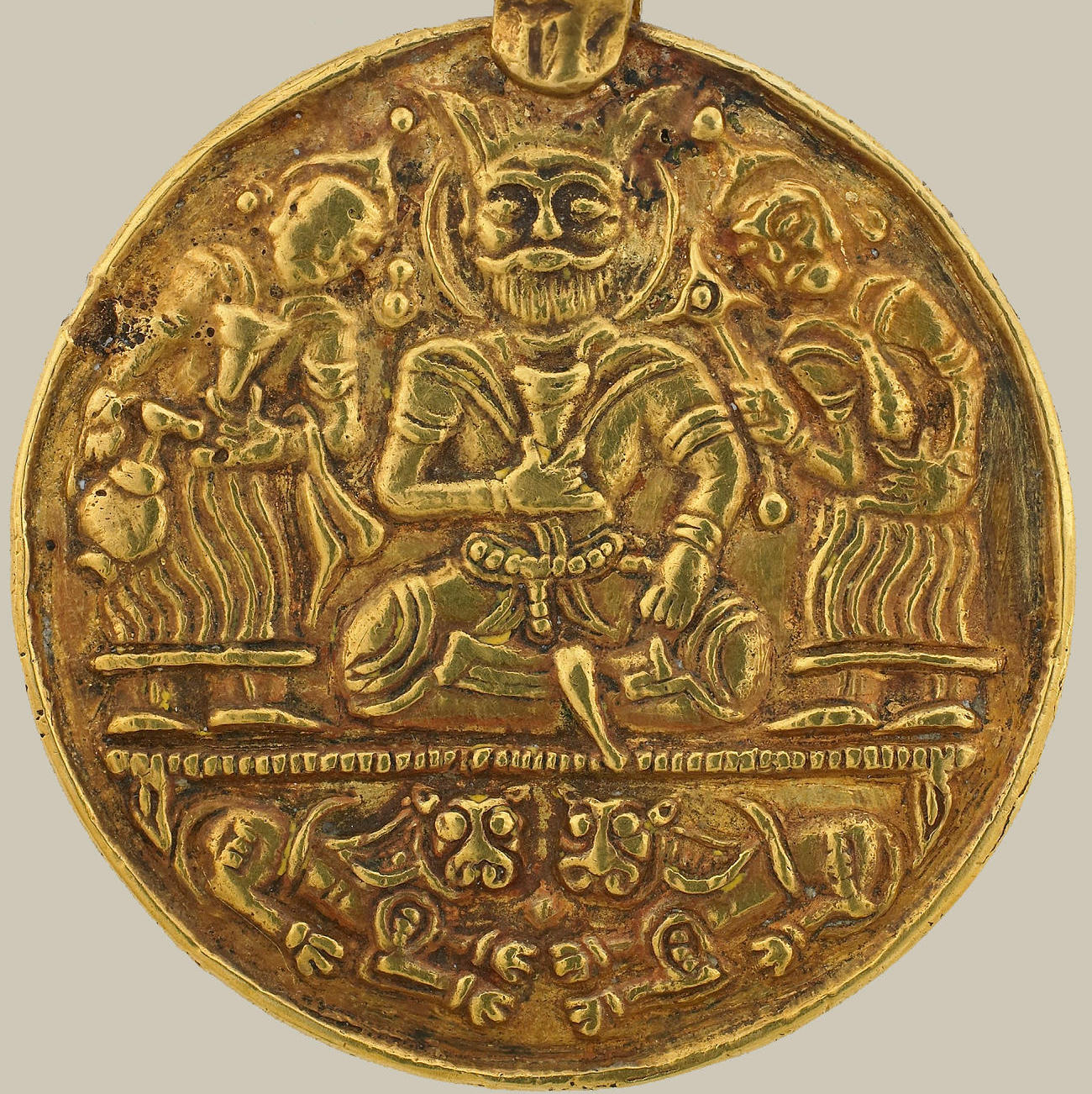
Medallion of Buyid amir 'Adud al-Dawla (r.936–983).

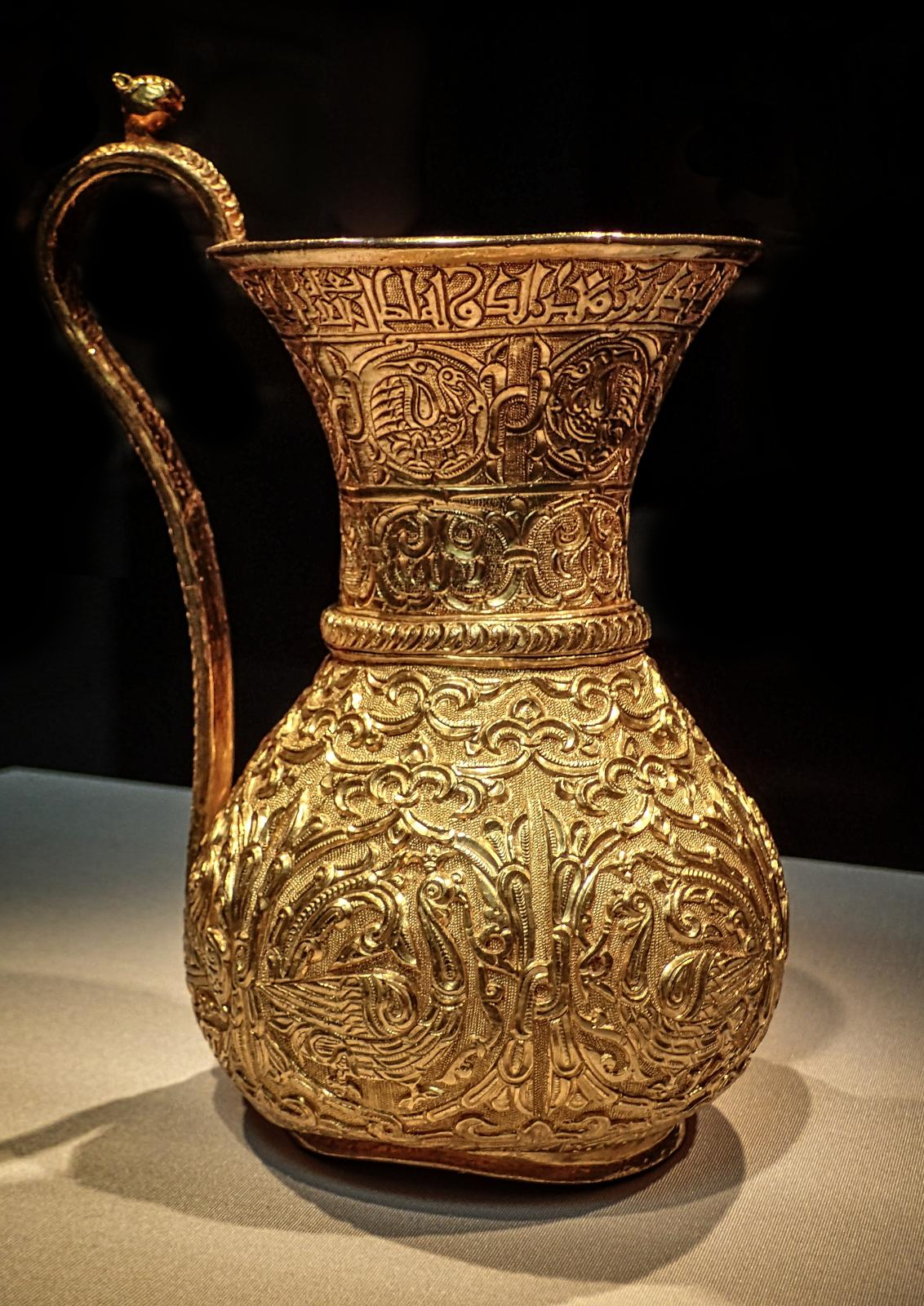
Gold ewer of the Buyid Period, mentioning Buyid ruler Izz al-Dawla Bakhtiyar ibn Mu'izz al-Dawla, 966-977 CE, Iran.

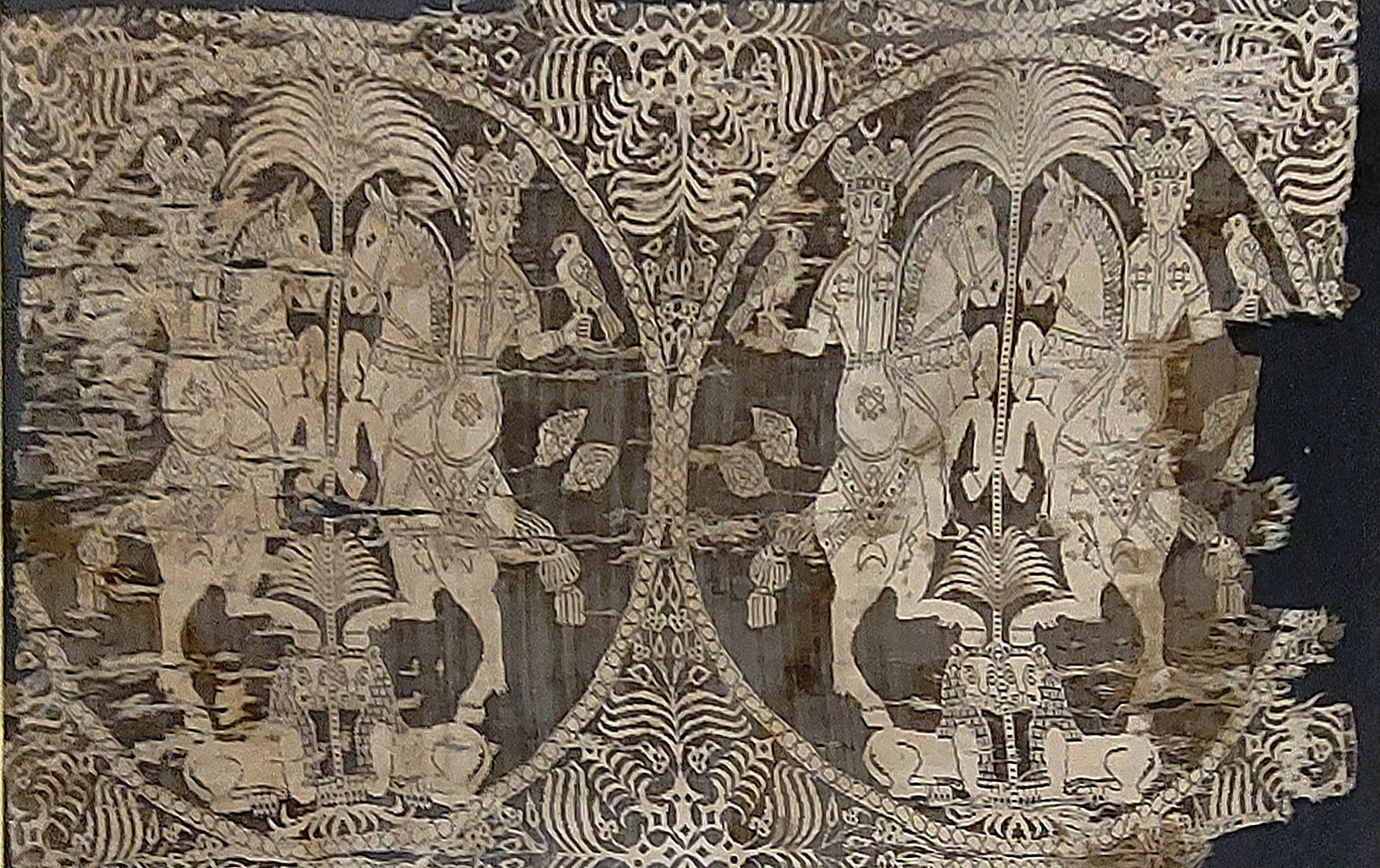
Buyid silk in pseudo-Sasanian style.

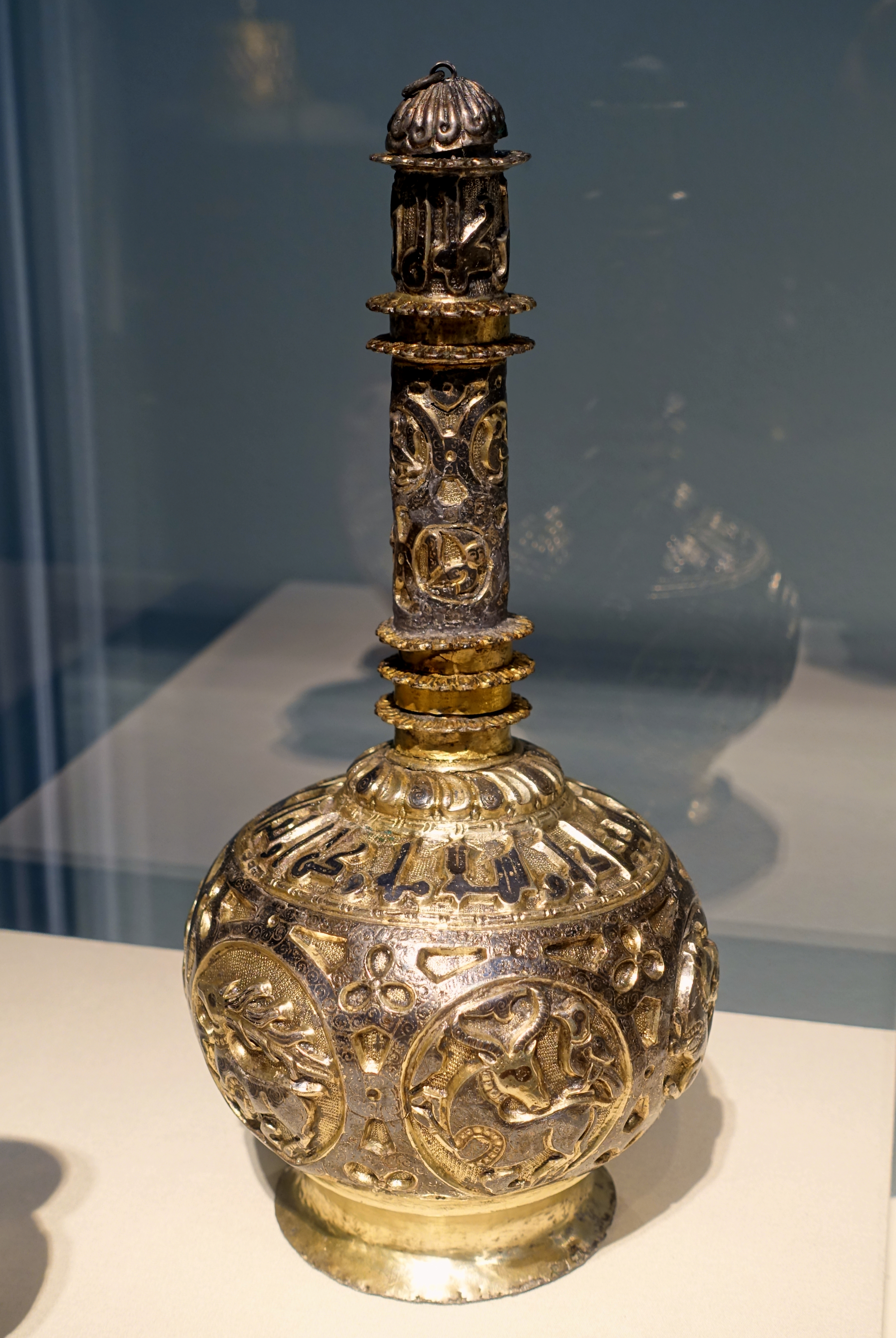
Rosewater bottle, Buyid art, early 12th century, Iran. Freer Gallery of Art.

=== Turkic dynasties (9–13th centuries) ===
With the rise of Turkic dynasties in Central Asia, Persian art started to evolve to adapt to the tastes of the new Turkic ruling class: in paintings, the composition of narrative scenes remains unchanged, but nomadic clothing, physical traits and power symbols (such as the bow and arrow) are now depicted. From the mid-12th century, beauty standards too evolve, with round and serene faces with almond-shaped eyes becoming uniquitous in artistic representations.

==== Kara-Khanid Khanate (840-1212) ====
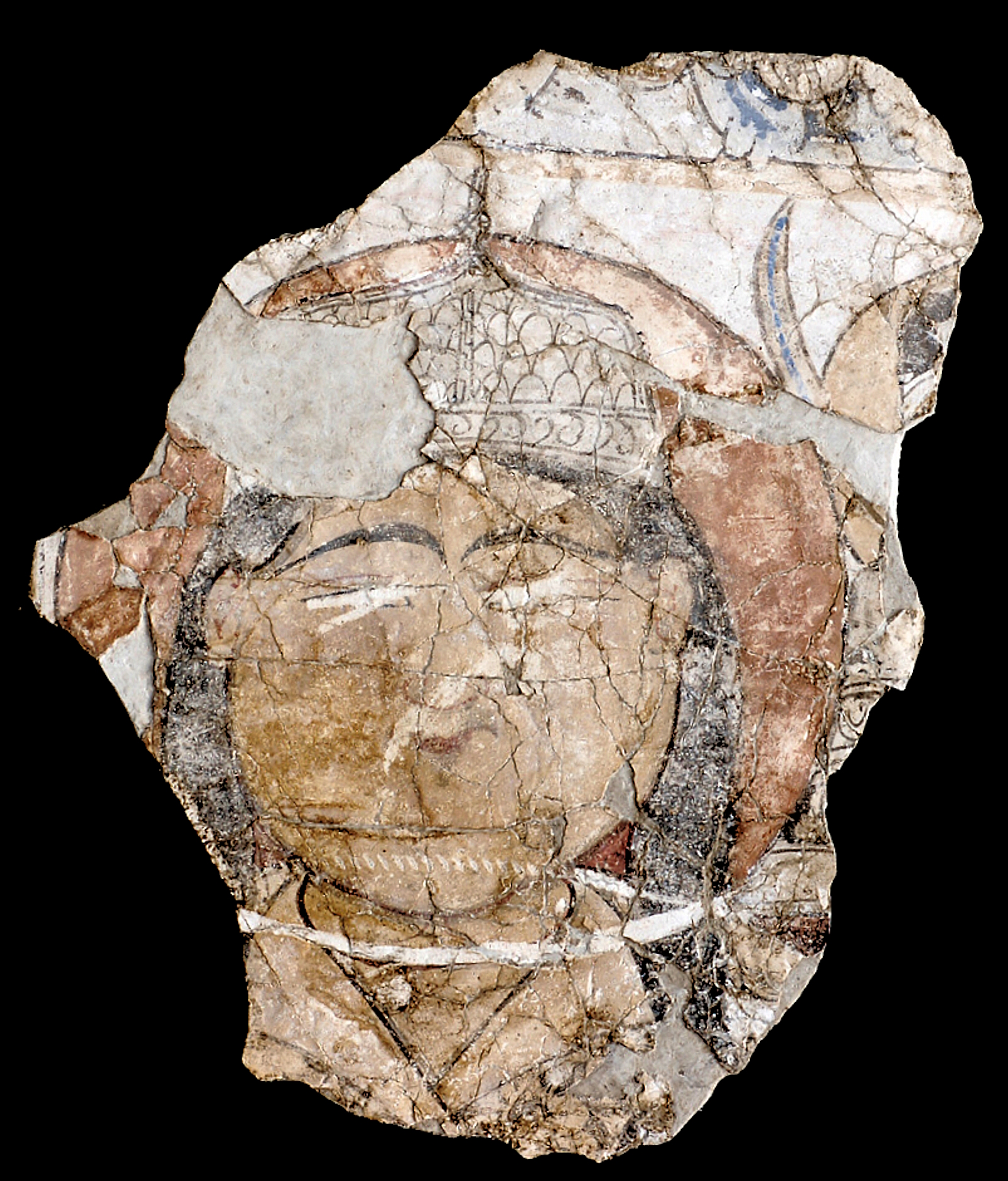
Detail of a Kara-Khanid ruler of Samarkand, probably Uthman ibn Ibrahim (sitting cross-legged on a throne in the complete reconstructed relief), Afrasiab, Samarkand, circa 1200 CE. It was possibly defaced in 1212 when the Khwarazmian Empire shah Muḥammad b. Tekish took over Samarkand.

A palatial structure dating to the Kara-Khanid Khanate (840–1212) was recently discovered in Afrasiab, complete with numerous decorative paintings dating to circa 1200. This period of artistic florescence would end in 1212, when the Kara-Khanids in Samarkand were conquered by the Kwarazmians. Soon however, Khwarezmia was invaded by the early Mongol Empire and its ruler Genghis Khan destroyed the once vibrant cities of Bukhara and Samarkand. However, in 1370, Samarkand saw a revival as the capital of the Timurid Empire.

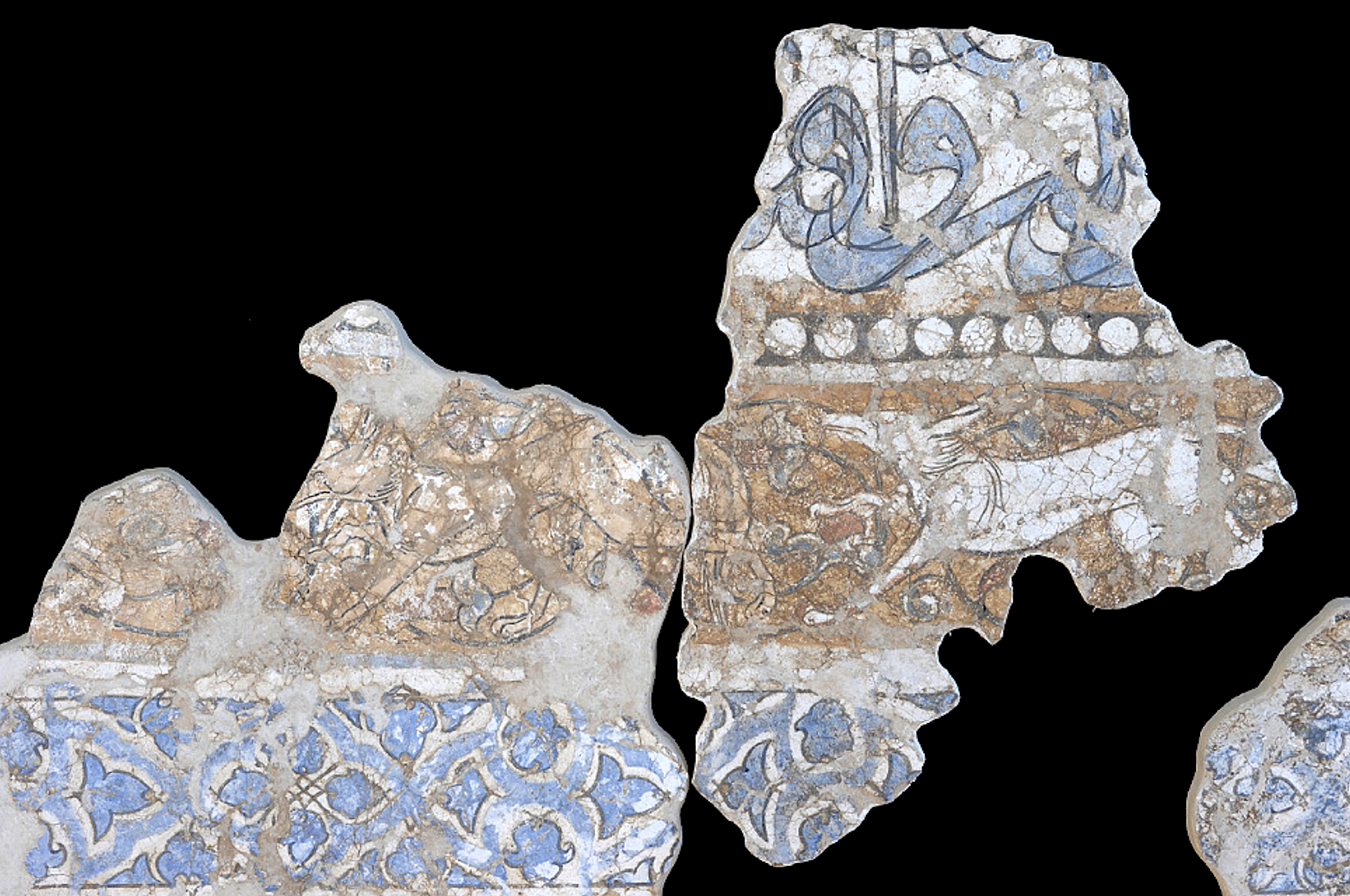
Kara-Khanid bands of inscription with running animals, Afrasiab, circa 1200 CE.

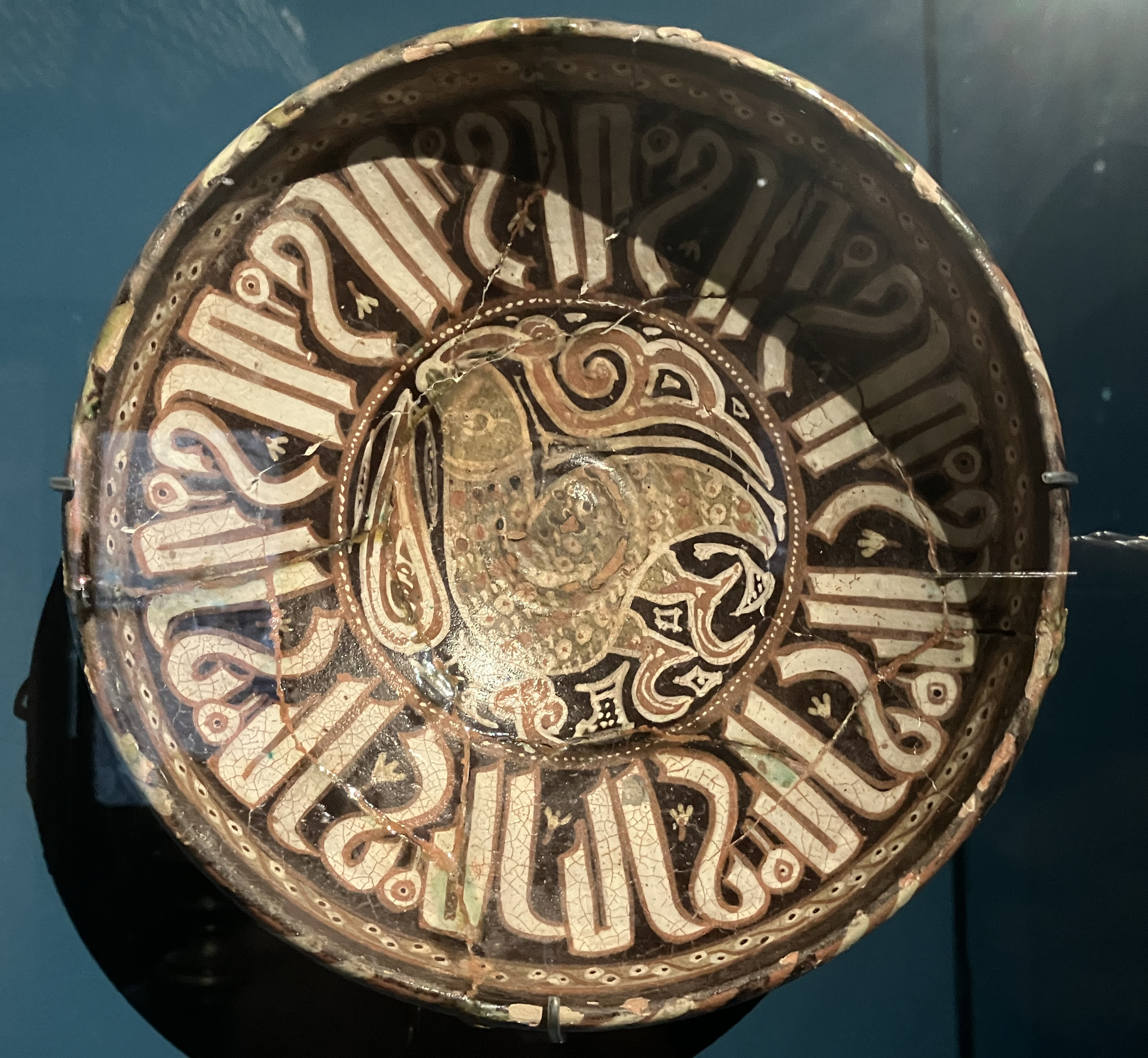
Bowl with bird. Afrasiab (Samarkand), 11th century.

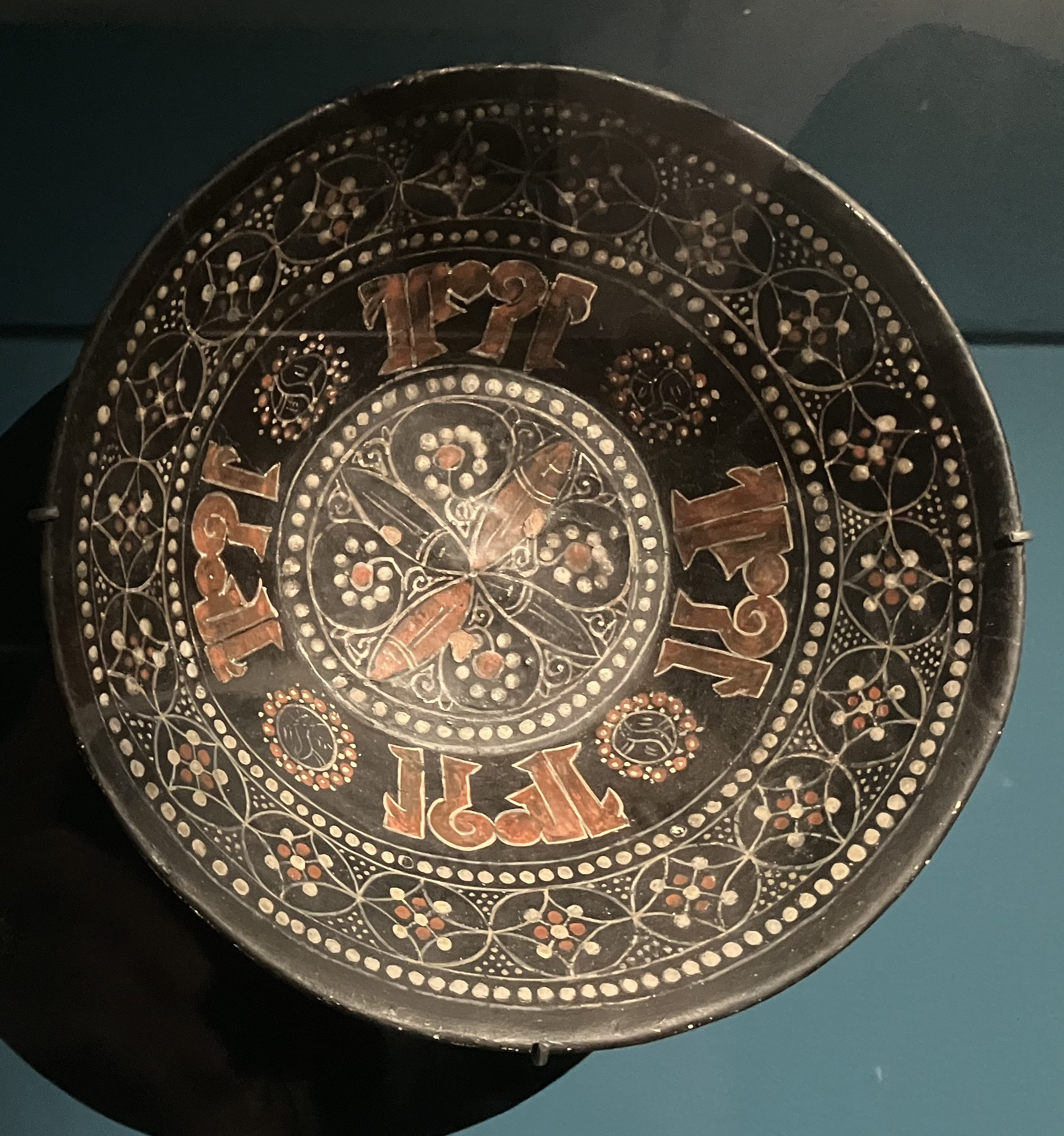
Bowl with bird. Afrasiab (Samarkand), 11th century.

==== Ghaznavids (977–1186) ====
The Ghaznavid dynasty was a Persianate Muslim dynasty of Turkic mamluk origin, (Note: The Ghaznavids were a dynasty of Turkic slave-soldiers...) at their greatest extent ruling large parts of Iran, Afghanistan, much of Transoxiana and the northwest Indian subcontinent from 977 to 1186.

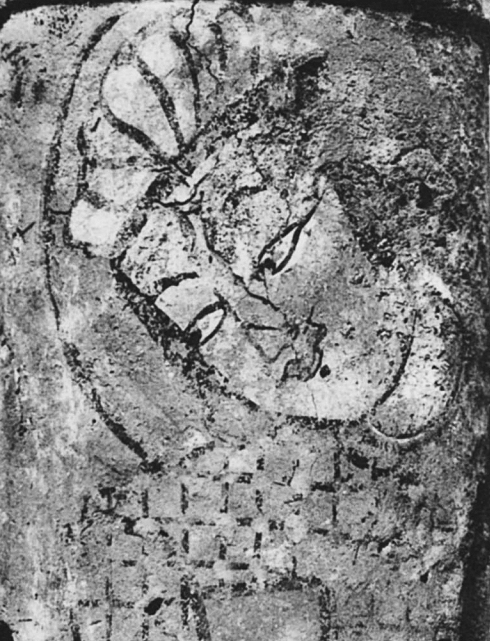
Ghaznavid portrait of a characteristically Turkic individual, Palace of Lashkari Bazar.

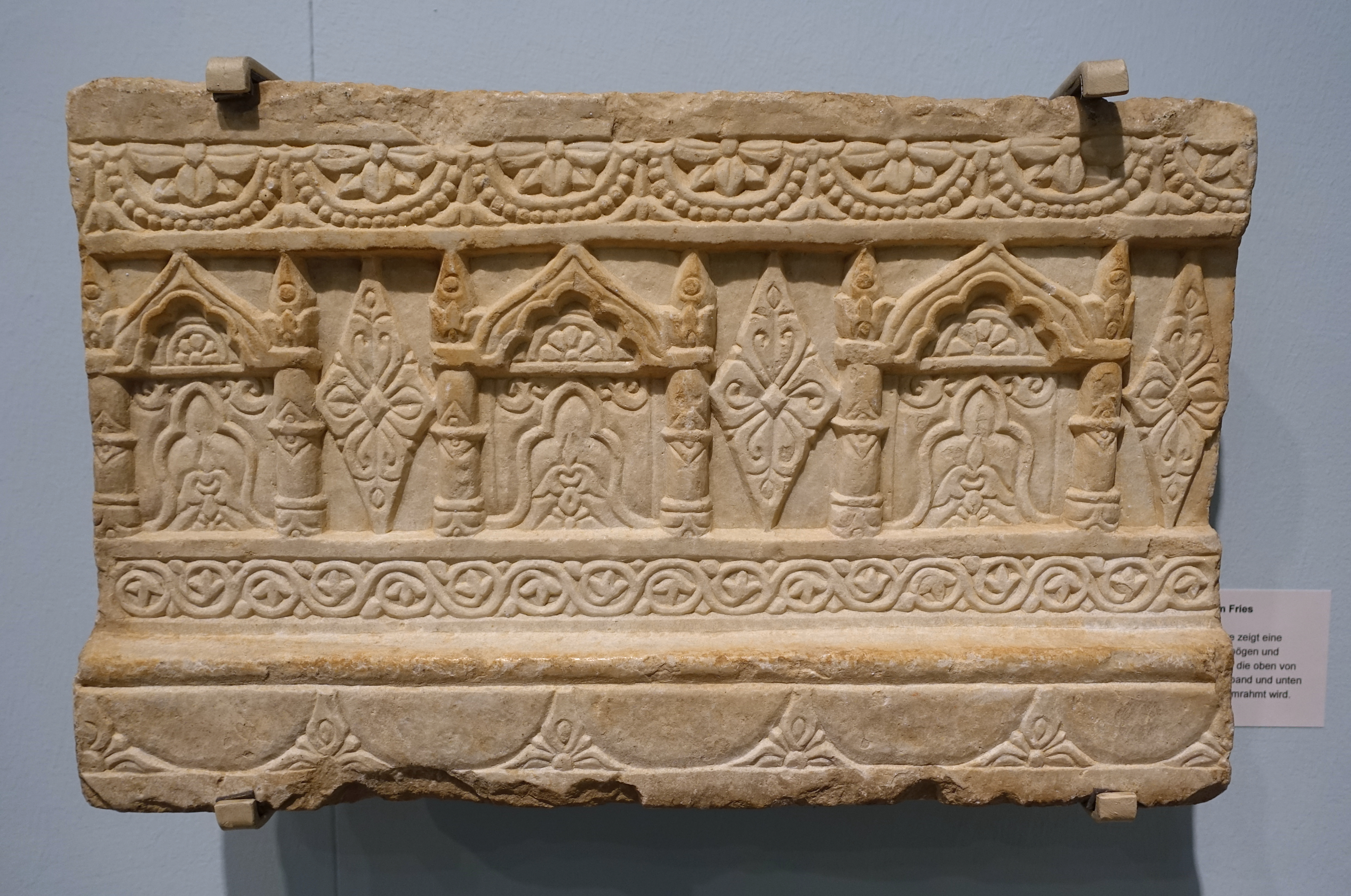
Ghaznavid sculpted architecture, marble, Ghazni, 12th century AD

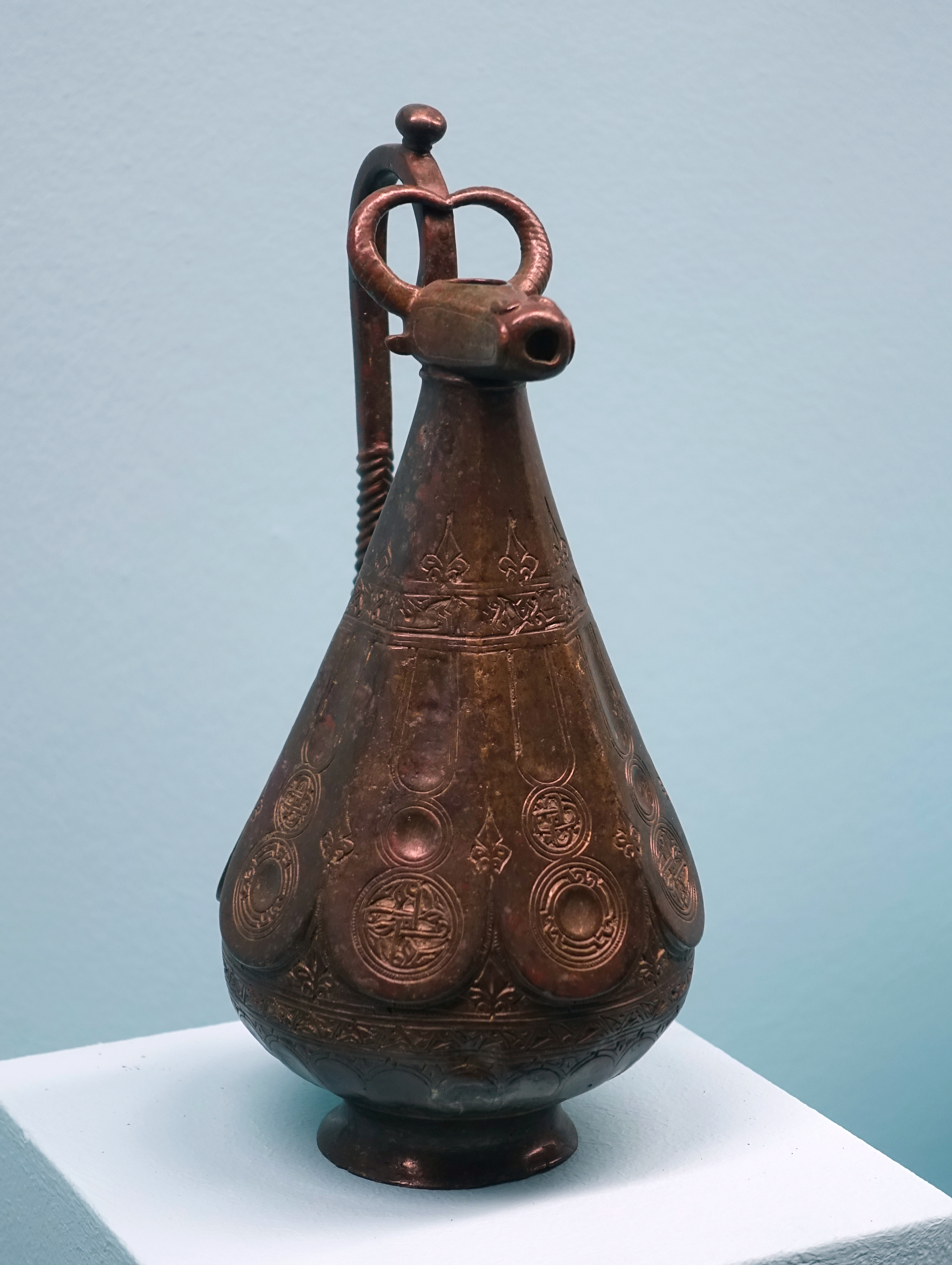
Vessel with bull's head spout, Ghaznavid dynasty, late 11th to early 12th century

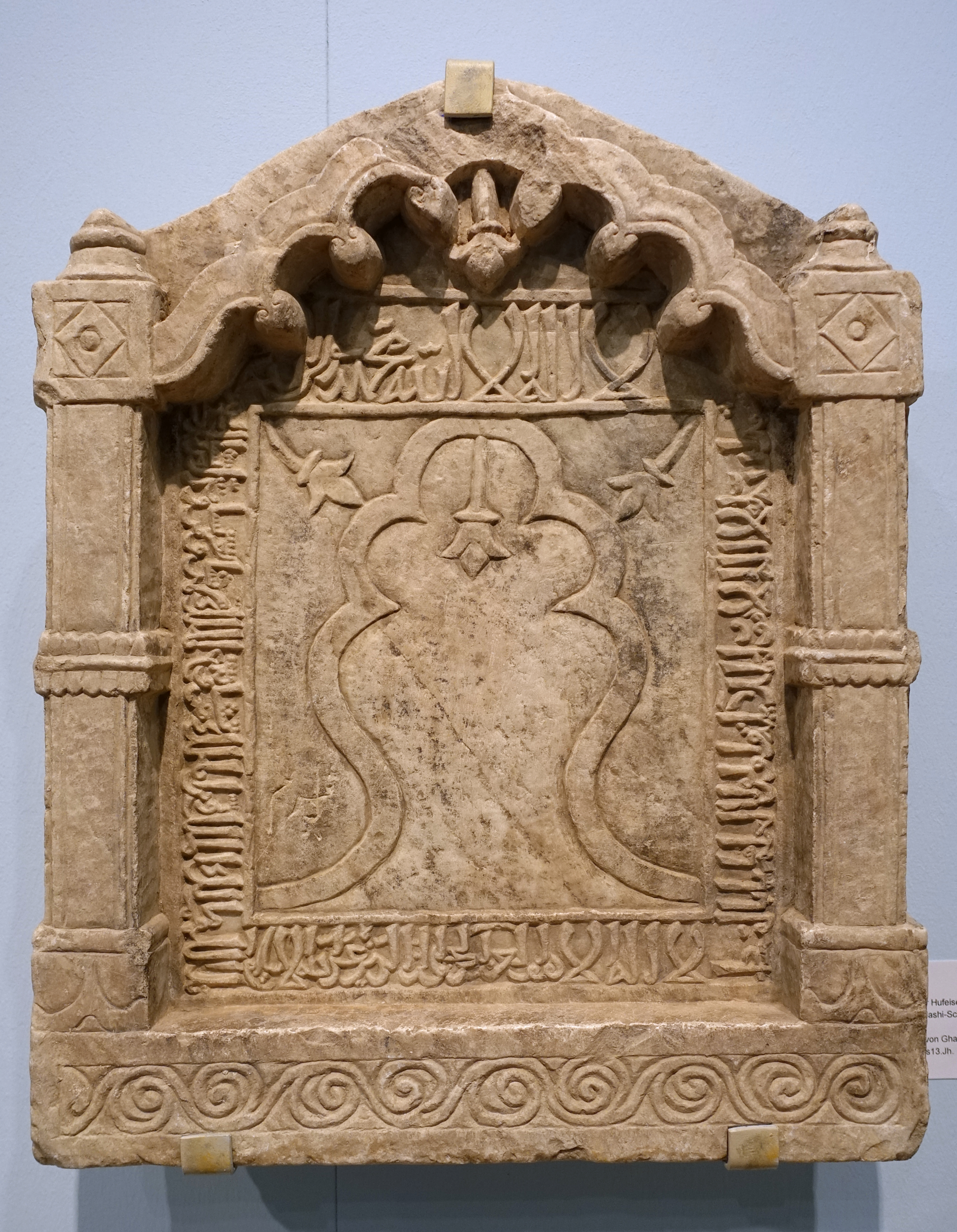
Ghaznavid sculpted architecture, marble, Ghazni, 12–13th century AD

==== Seljuks (1037–1194) ====
The Seljuk Empire (1037–1194 AD) was a high medieval Turko-Persian Sunni Muslim empire, originating from the Qiniq branch of Oghuz Turks. At its greatest extent, the Seljuk Empire controlled a vast area stretching from western Anatolia and the Levant to the Hindu Kush in the east, and from Central Asia to the Persian Gulf in the south.

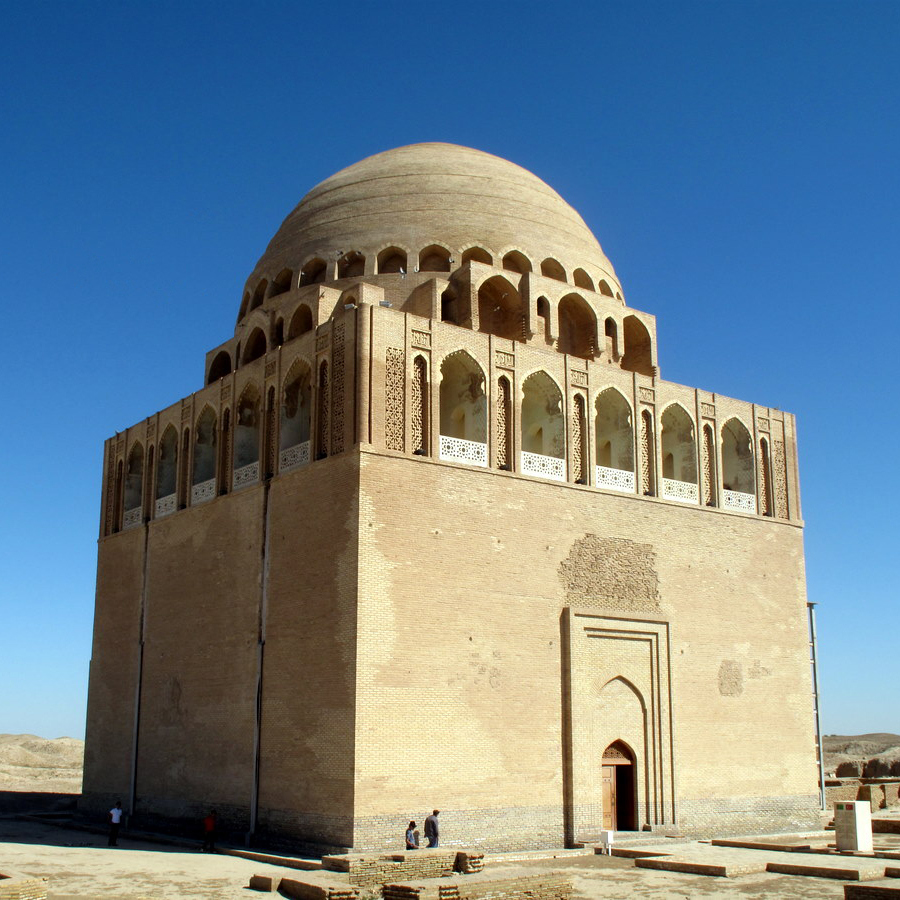
Mausoleum of Sultan Sanjar in Merv, Turkmenistan.

Seljuk-era art: Ghurid Ewer from Herat, Afghanistan, dated 1180–1210 AD. Brass worked in repousse and inlaid with silver and bitumen. British Museum.

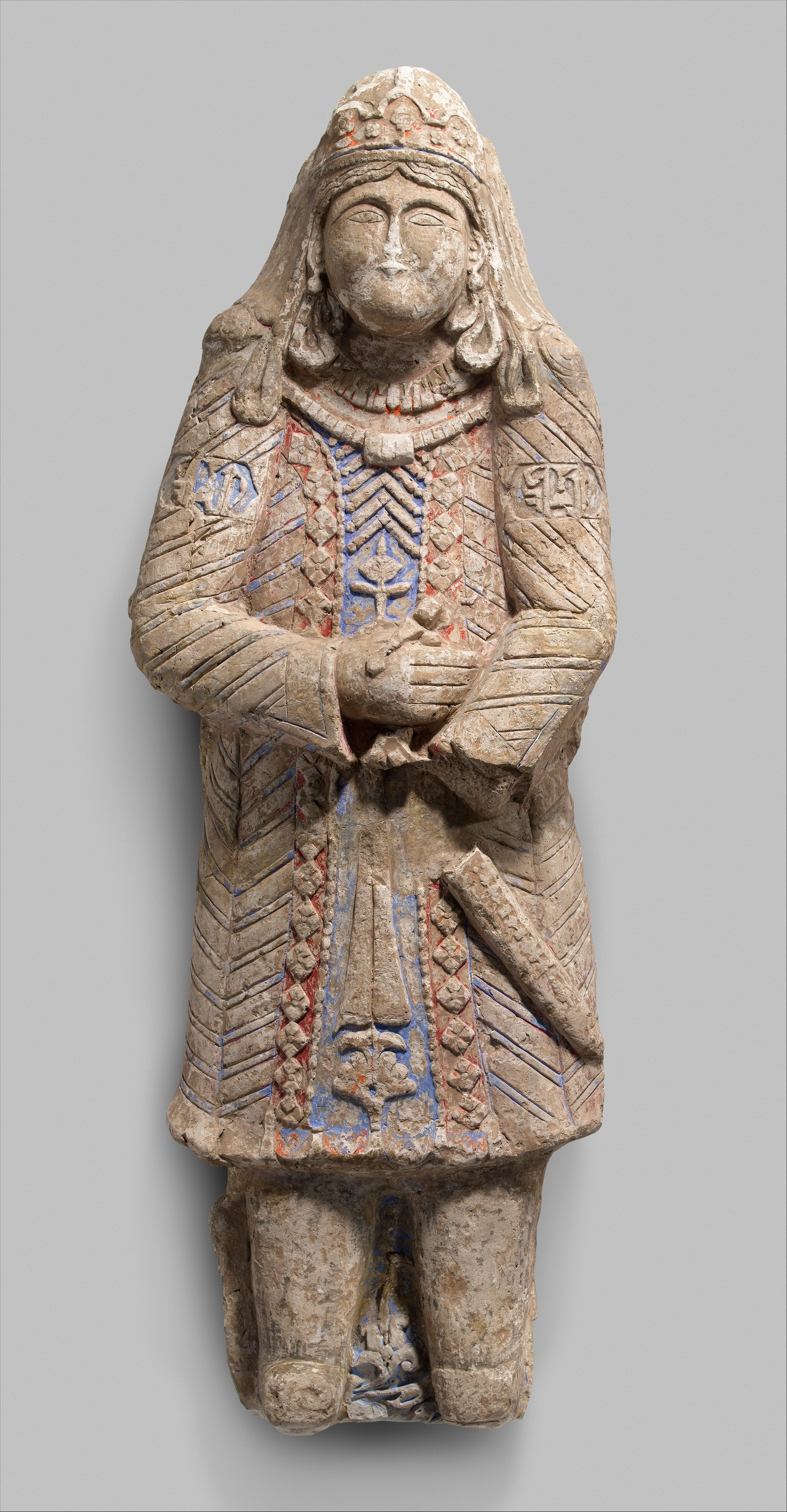
Princely figure related to the Seljuq sultan or one of his local vassals or successors, Seljuk period, Iran, late 12th–13th century.

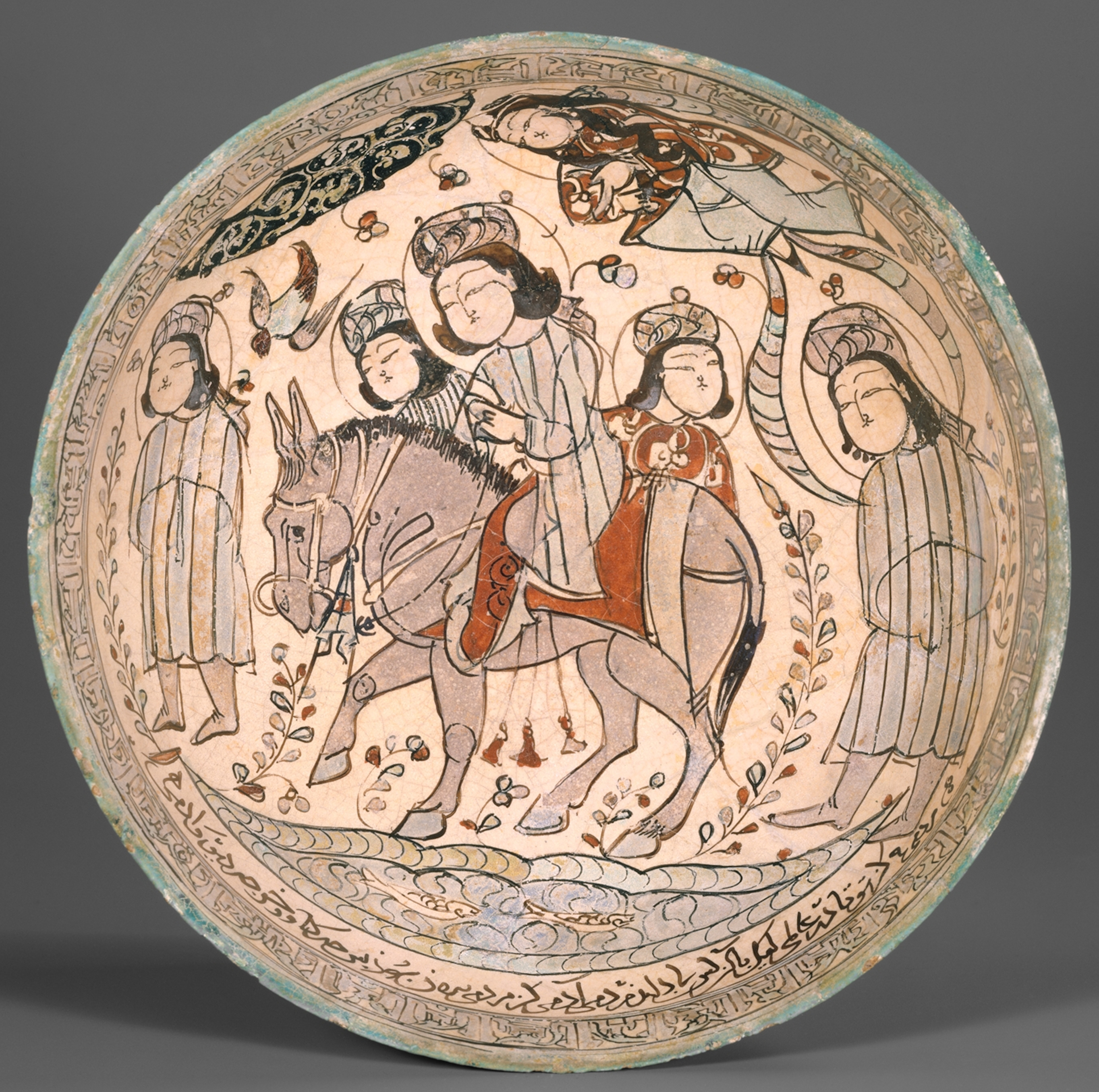
Mina'i bowl signed by Abu Zayd al-Kashani, dated 1187 CE, Iran.

==== Khwarazmians (1077–1231) ====
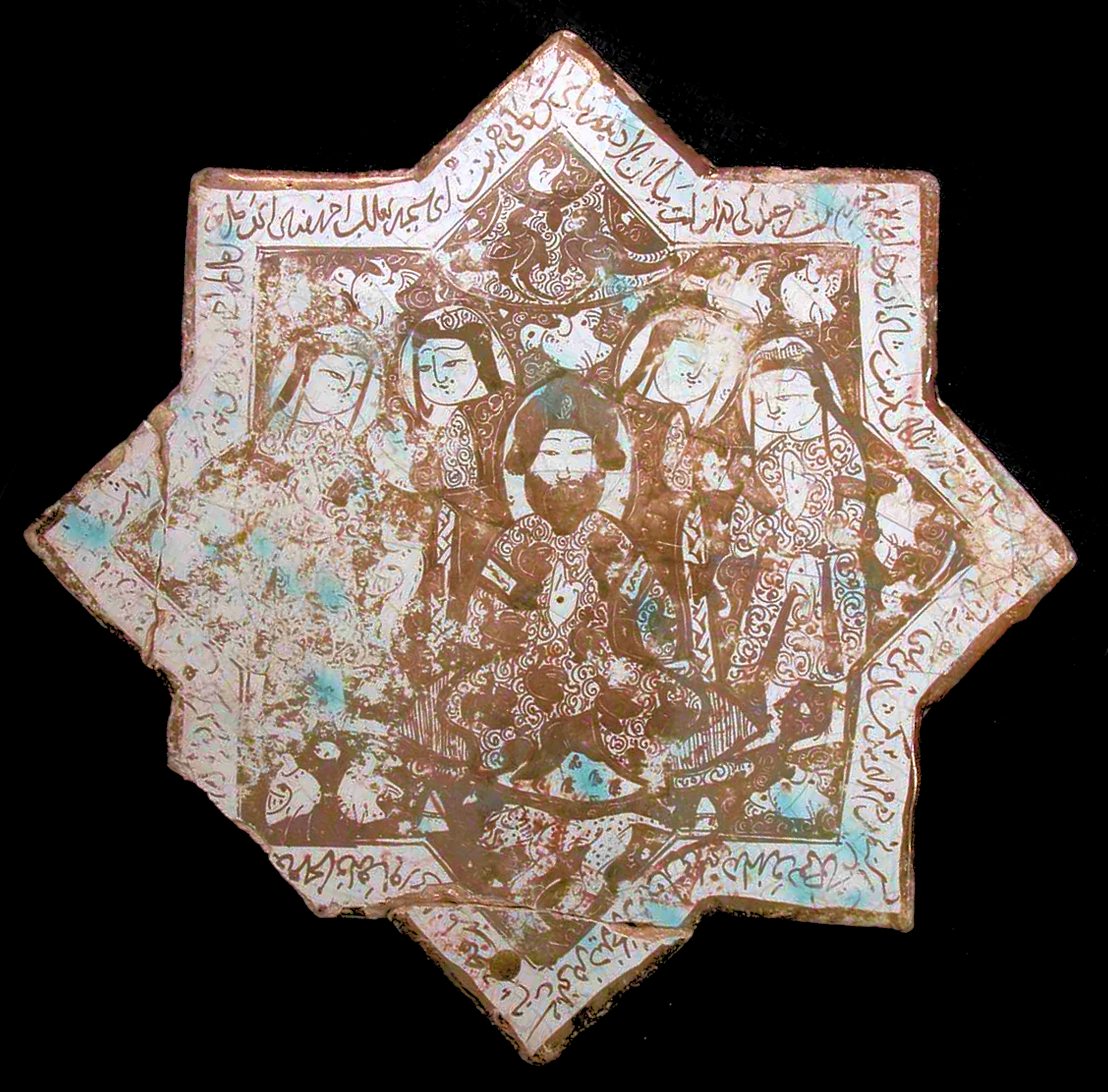
Luster star-shaped tile, showing a sultan surrounded by members of the court, dated 1211–12 CE. Kashan, Iran.

The Khwarezmian Empire was the last Turco-Persian Empire before the Mongol invasion of Central Asia. Finely decorated Mina'i ceramics were mainly produced in Kashan, in the decades leading up to the Mongol invasion of Persia in 1219, at a time when the Khwarazmian Empire ruled the area, initially under the suzerainty of the Seljuk Empire, and independently from 1190. Some of the "most iconic" productions of stonepaste vessels can be attributed to the Khwarazmian rulers, after the end of Seljuk domination (the Seljuk Empire itself ended in 1194). In general, it is considered that Mina'i ware was manufactured from the late 12th century and the early 13th century, and dated Mina’i wares range from 1186 to 1224.

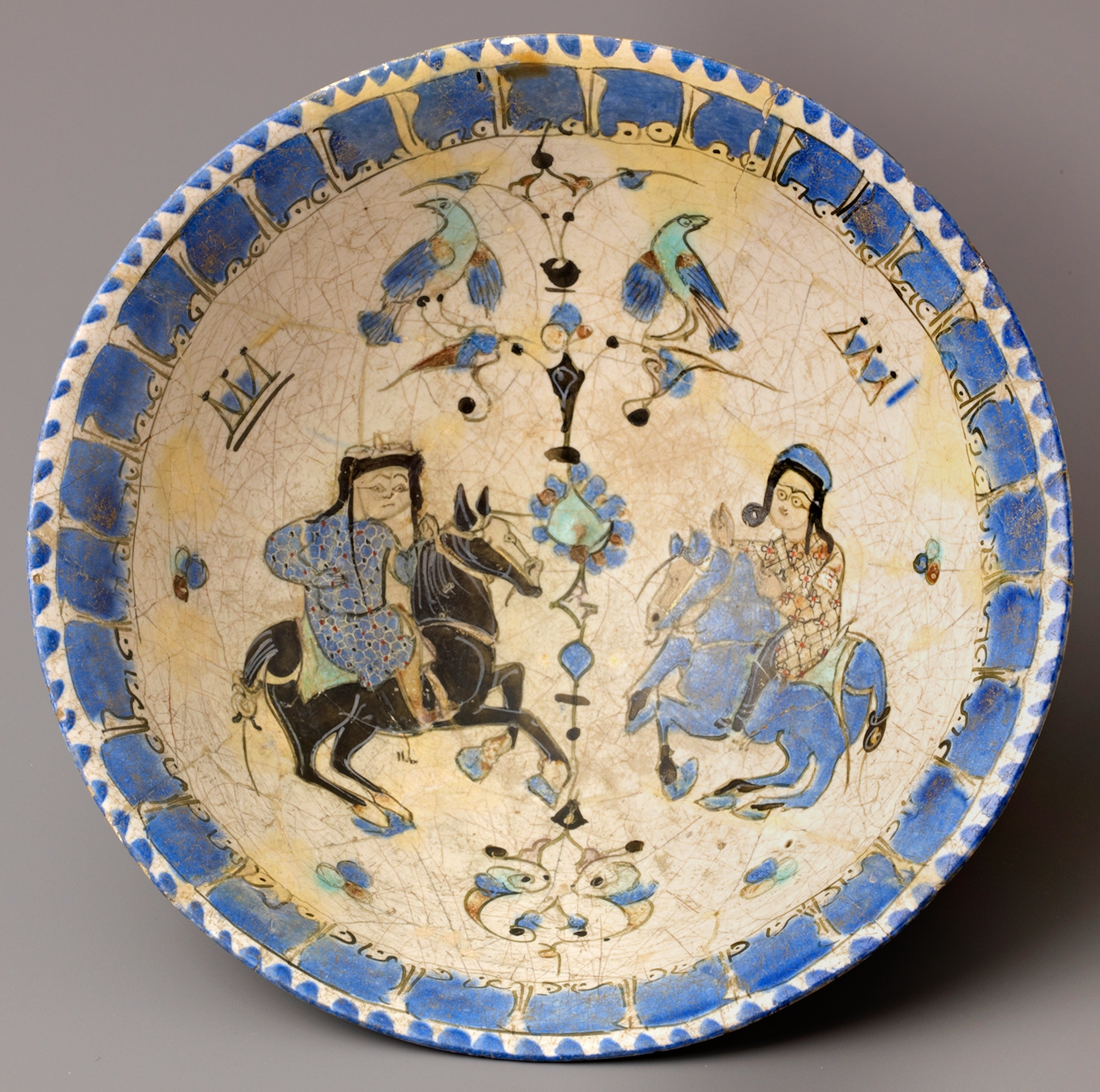
Horsemen, Mina'i ware, early 13th century, Iran.

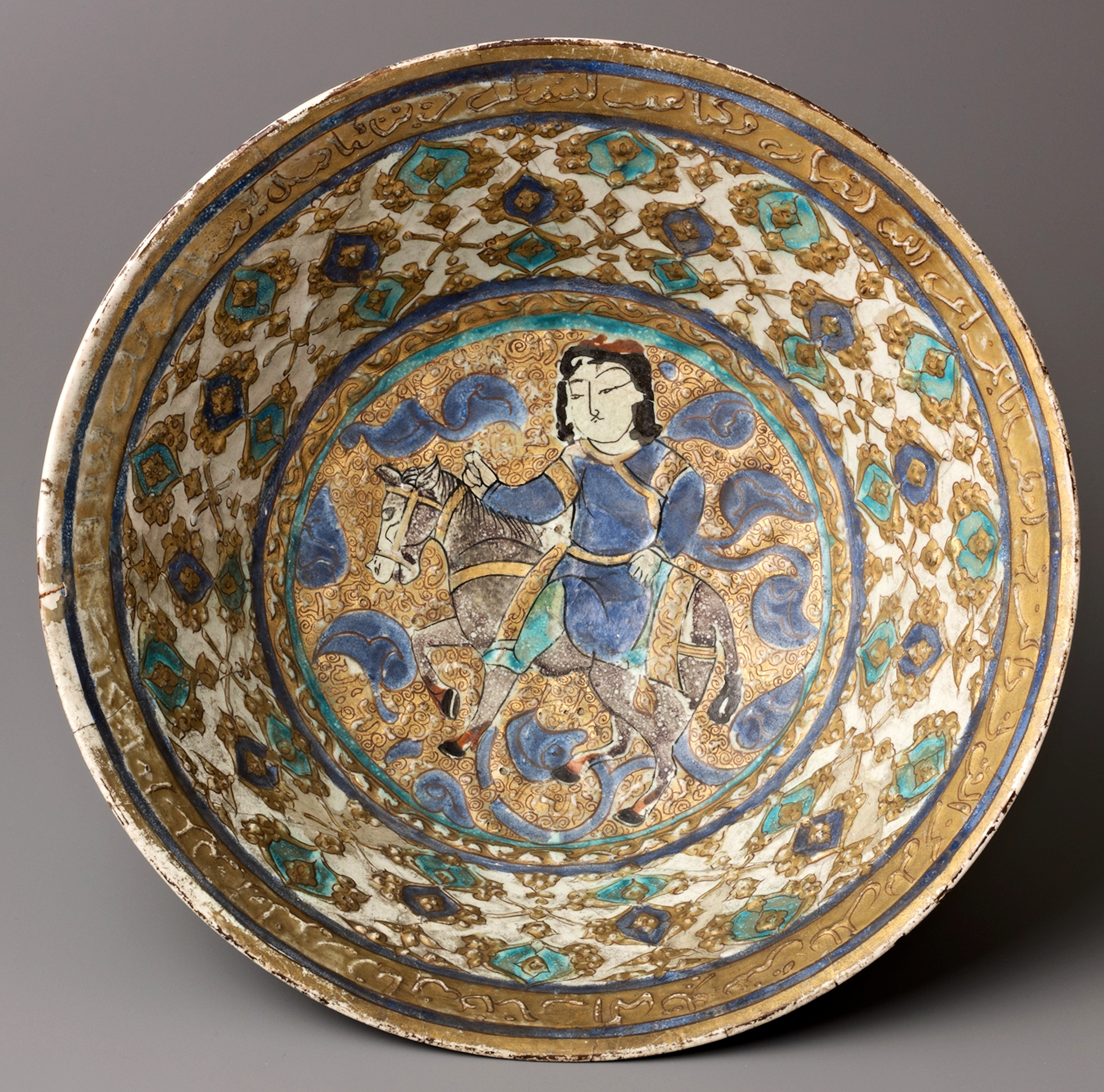
Mina'i Bowl with horserider, early 13th century, Iran.

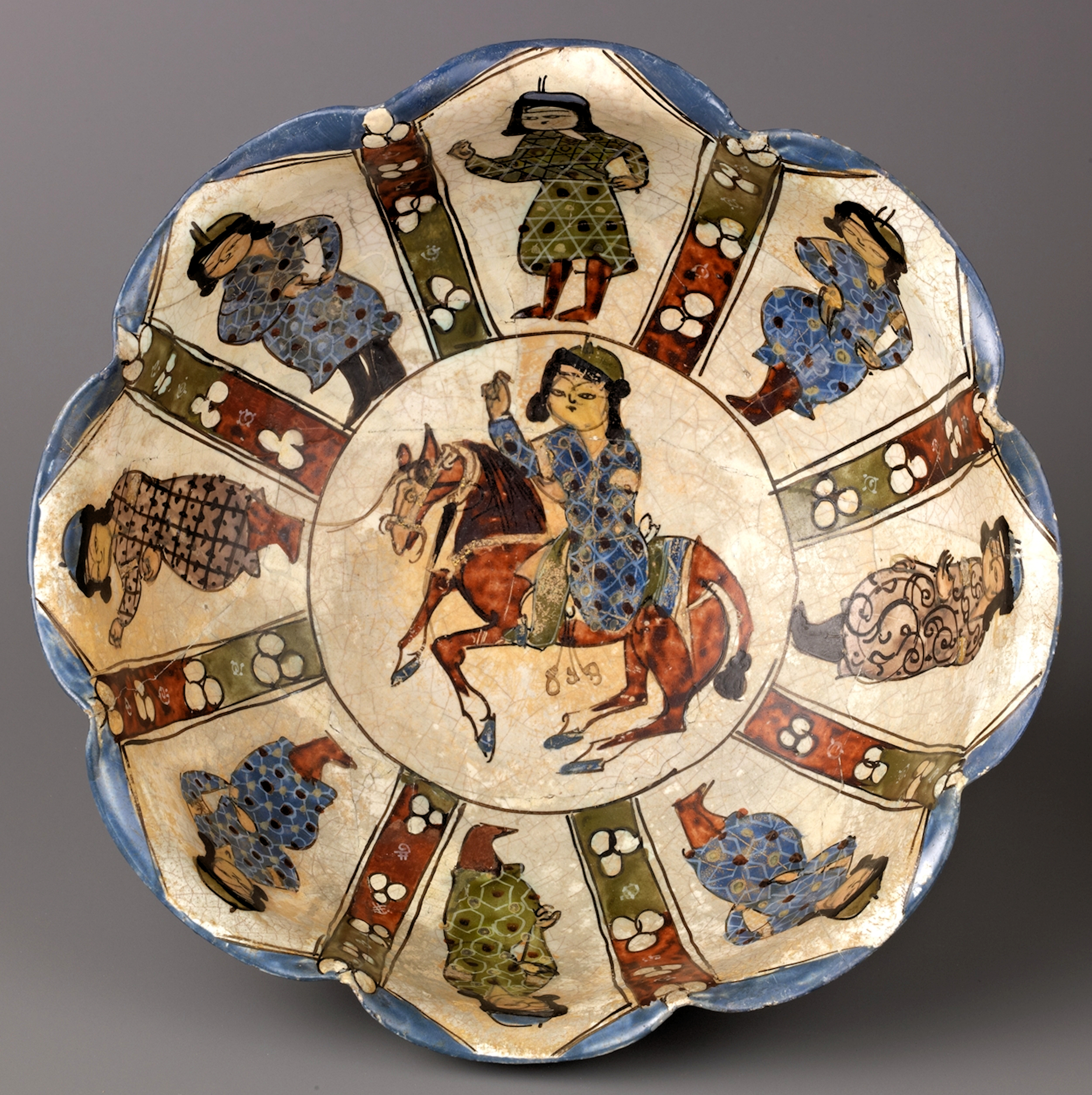
Mina'i Lobed bowl, early 13th century, Iran.

== Mongol invasion ==
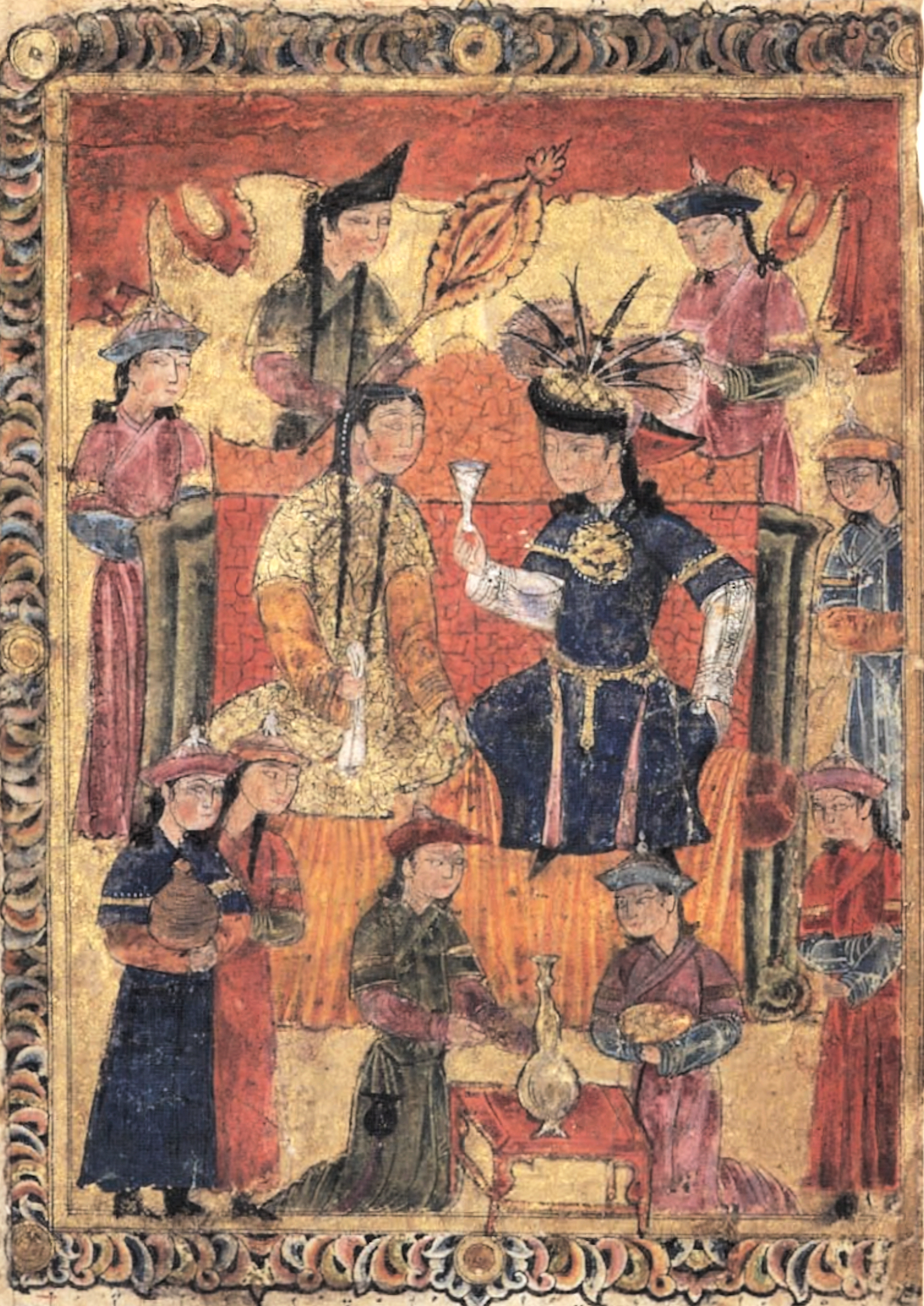
Mongol Ilkhanid court scene. Mu'nis al-ahrar, left frontispiece, 1341, probably Isfahan.

The Mongols under Genghis Khan invaded Central Asia in the early 13th century. The unified Mongol Empire was succeeded by the Chagatai Khanate, a Mongol and later Turkicized khanate. that comprised the lands ruled by Chagatai Khan, second son of Genghis Khan and his descendants and successors. At its height in the late 13th century, the khanate extended from the Amu Darya south of the Aral Sea to the Altai Mountains in the border of modern-day Mongolia and China, roughly corresponding to the defunct Qara Khitai Empire. Initially the rulers of the Chagatai Khanate recognized the supremacy of the Great Khan, but by the reign of Kublai Khan, Ghiyas-ud-din Baraq no longer obeyed the emperor's orders.

=== Timurid Renaissance ===
During the mid-14th century, the Chagatais lost Transoxania to the Timurids circa 1370. After the Mongol invasions, a new period of prosperity thus started, the Timurid Renaissance. After conquering a city, the Timurids commonly spared the lives of the local artisans and deported them to the Timurid capital of Samarkand. After the Timurids conquered Persia in the early 15th century, many Persian artistic traits became interwoven with existing Mongol art. Timur made Samarkand one of the centers of Islamic art and remained a subject of interest to Ibn Khaldun. In the mid 15th century the empire moved its capital to Herat, which became a focal point for Timurid art. As with Samarkand, Persian artisans and intellectuals soon established Herat as a center for arts and culture. Soon, many of the Timurids adopted Persian culture as their own.

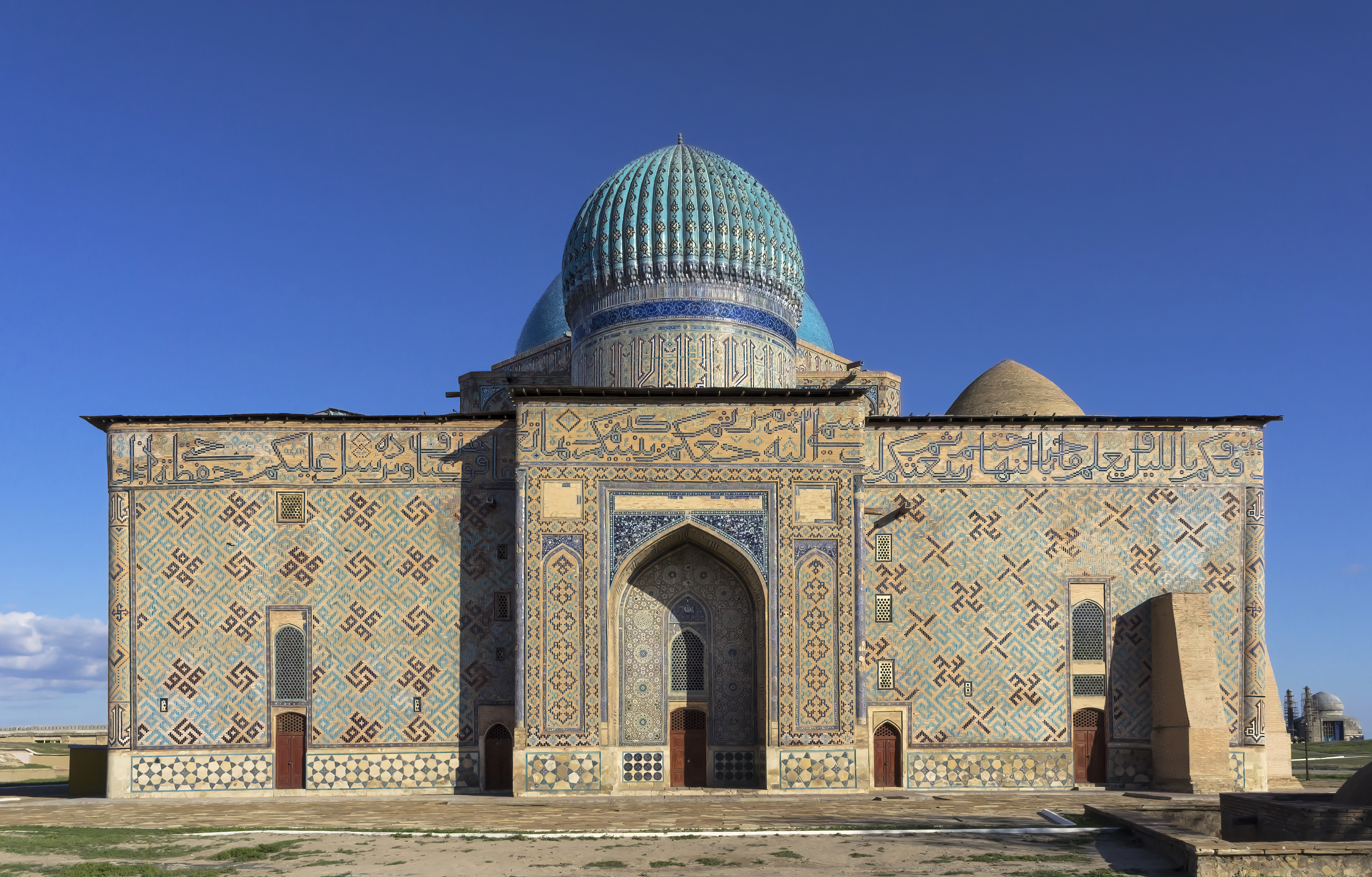
Mausoleum of Khoja Ahmed Yasawi in Hazrat-e Turkestan, Kazakhstan. Timurid architecture consisted of Persian art.

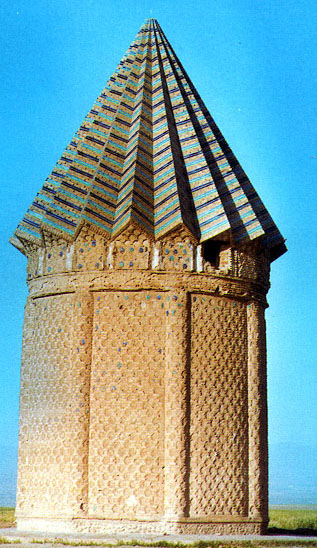
Akhangan's tomb, where Gawhar Shad's sister Gowhartāj is buried. The architecture is a fine example of the Timurid era in Persia.

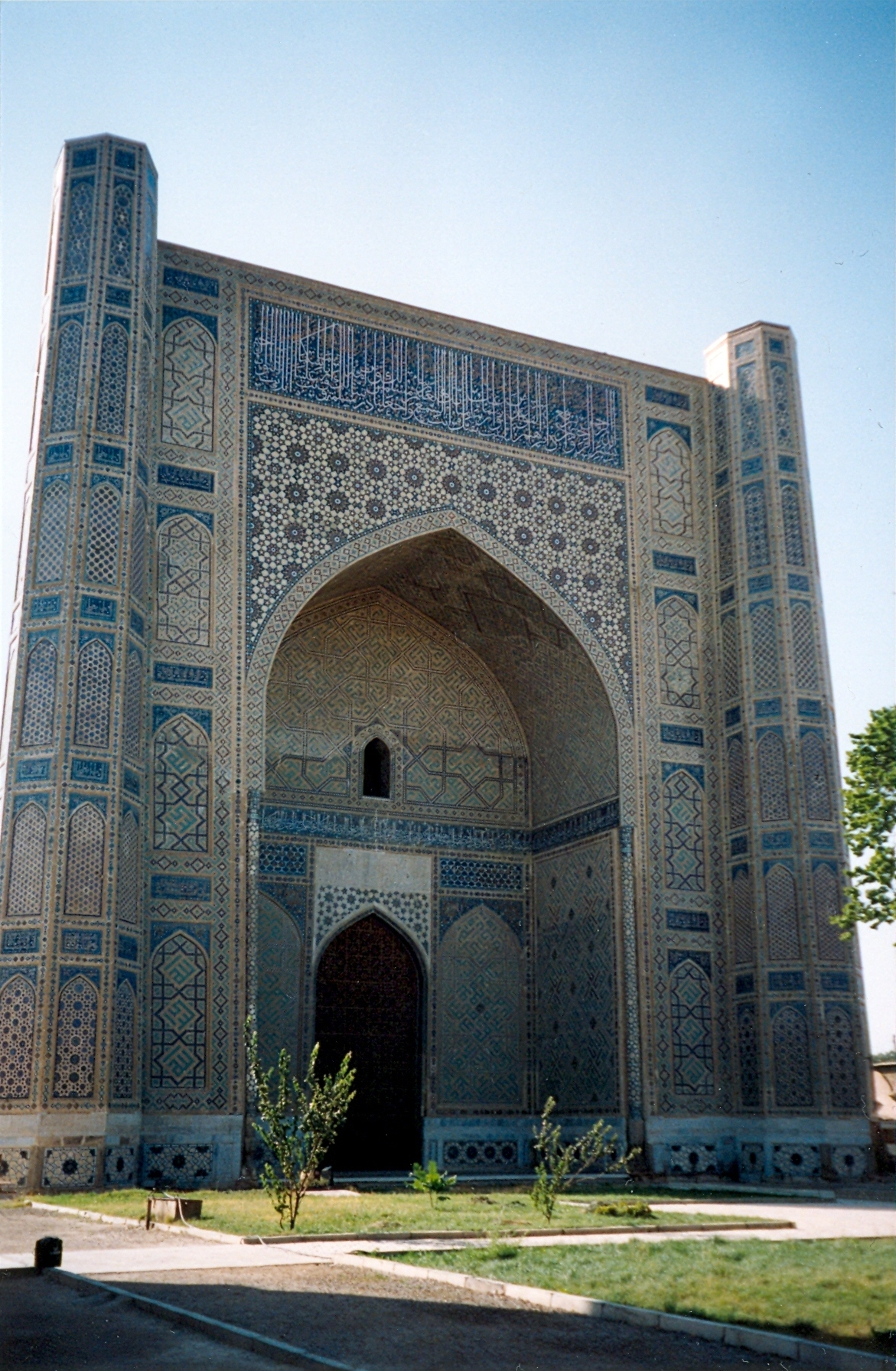
Façade of Bibi Khanym Mosque, Samarkand.

=== Khanate of Bukhara and Khanate of Khiva ===
The Khanate of Bukhara was a state centered on Uzbekistan from the second quarter of the 16th century to the late 18th century. Bukhara became the capital of the short-lived Shaybanid empire during the reign of Ubaydallah Khan (1533–1540). The khanate reached its greatest extent and influence under its penultimate Shaybanid ruler, the scholarly Abdullah Khan II (r. 1557–1598). In the 17th and 18th centuries, the Khanate was ruled by the Janid dynasty (Astrakhanids or Toqay Timurids). They were the last Genghisid descendants to rule Bukhara.

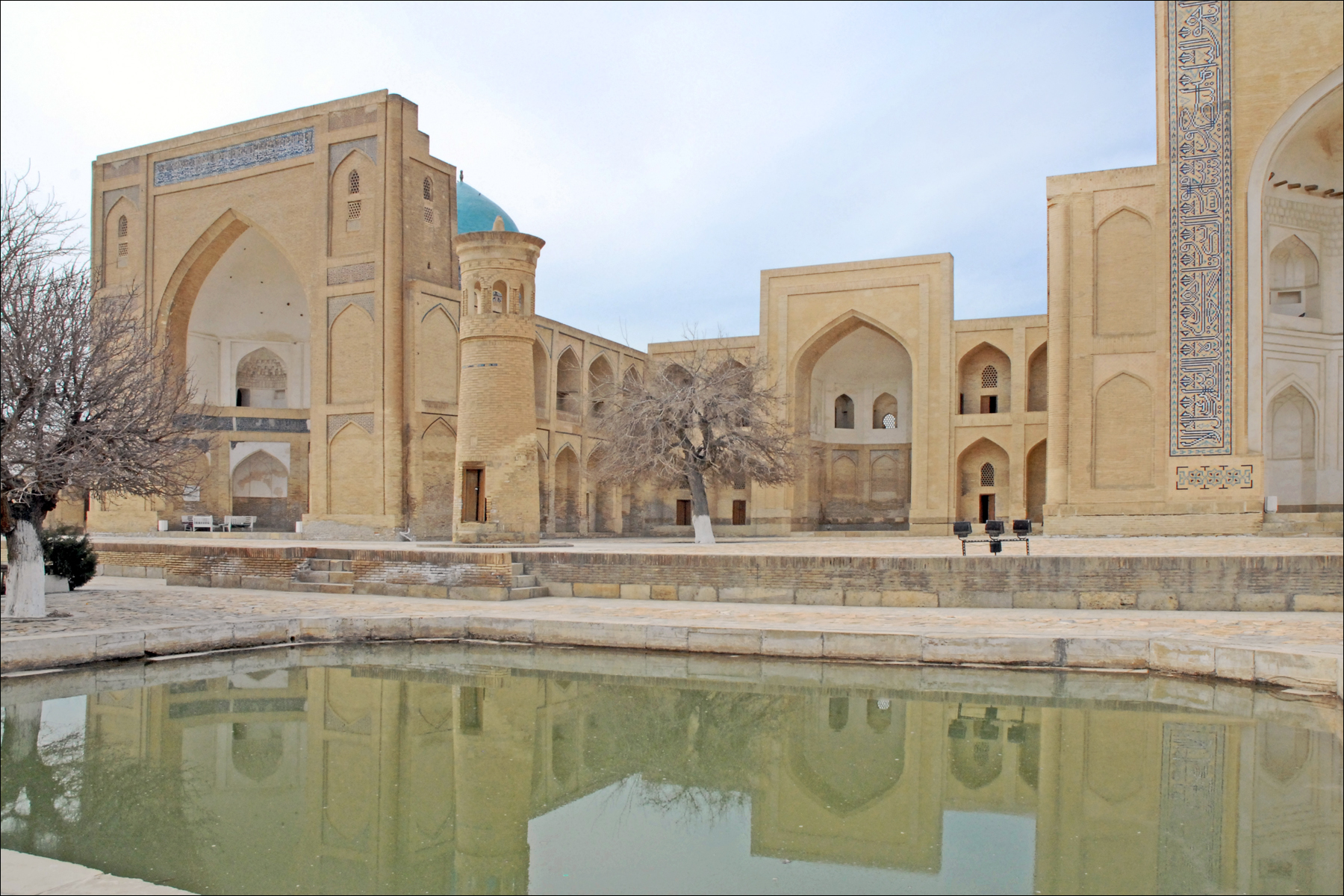
Chor-Bakr memorial complex, built by Muhammad Shaybani c. 1510, Bukhara

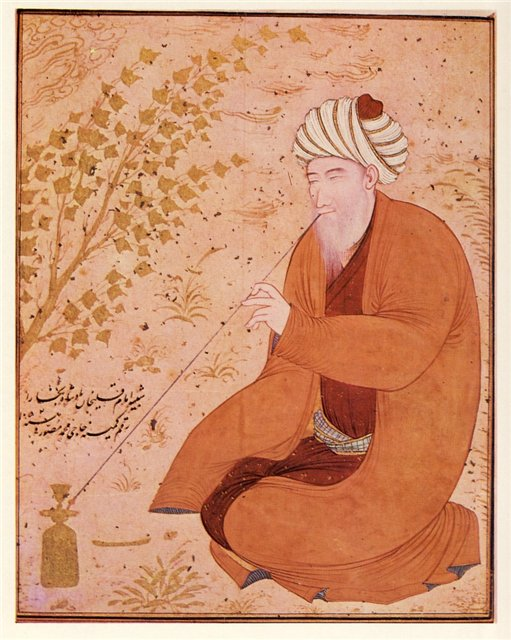
Imamquli-khan

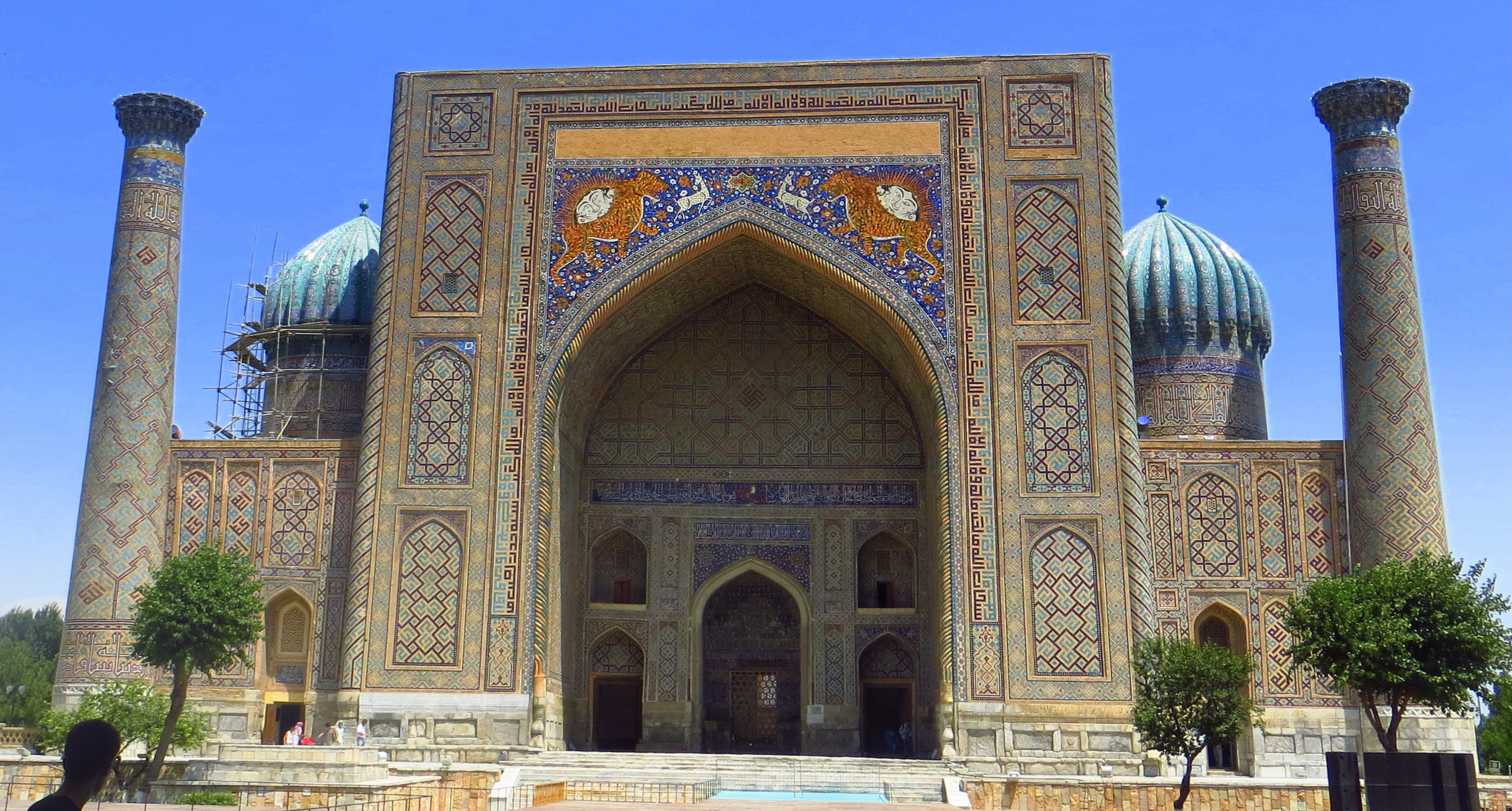
The Sherdar Madrasa, built between 1619 and 1636 by Governor of Samarkand Yalangtoʻsh Bakhodir, Khanate of Bukhara

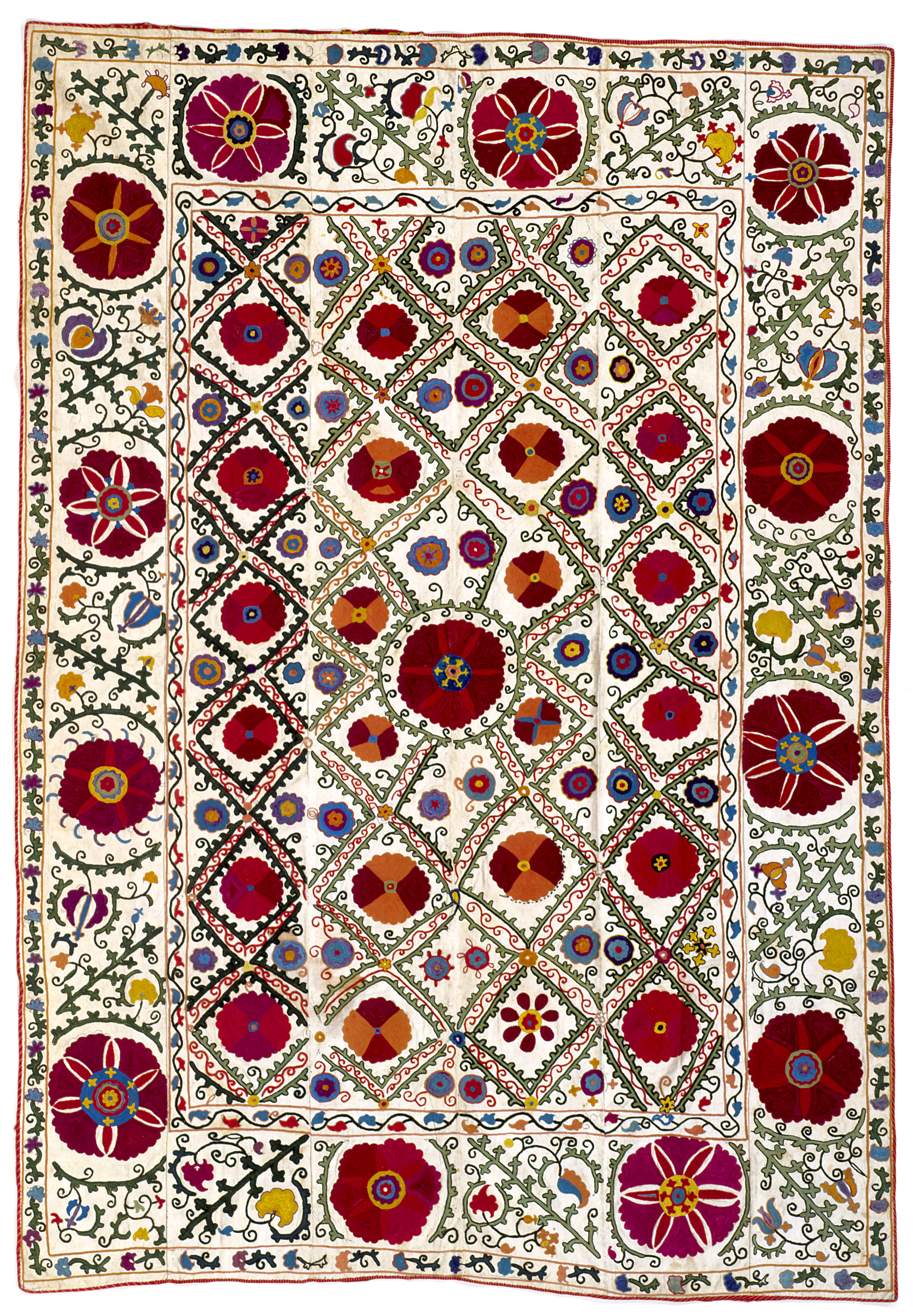
Suzani (ceremonial hanging); late 1700s; cotton; 92 × 63; from Uzbekistan; Indianapolis Museum of Art (US)

== Russian Turkestan (1867–1917) ==
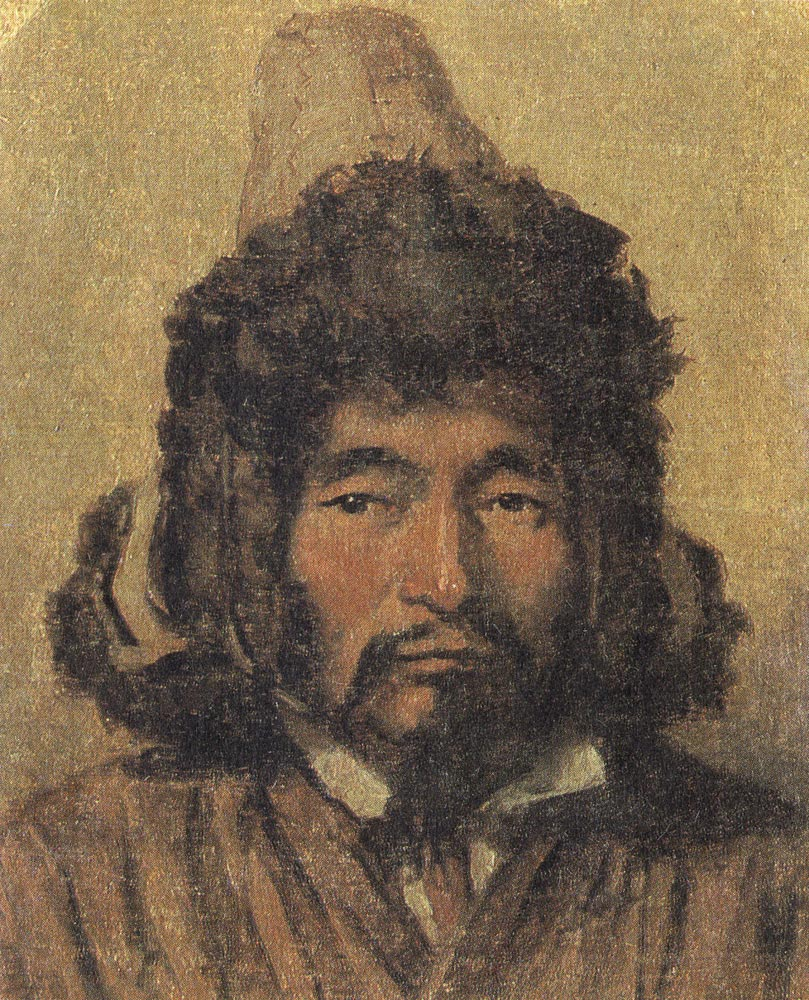
Kazakh in a fur hat (1867–1868), Vasily Vereshchagin (1842–1904).

Central Asia fell largely under the control of Russia in the 19th century, following the Russian conquest of Central Asia. Russian Turkestan (1867–1917) was the western part of Turkestan within the Russian Empire's Central Asian territories, and was administered as a krai or governor-generalship. It comprised the oasis region to the south of the Kazakh Steppe, but not the protectorates of the Emirate of Bukhara and the Khanate of Khiva. As a consequence of Russian colonization, European fine arts – painting, sculpture and graphics – have developed in Central Asia.

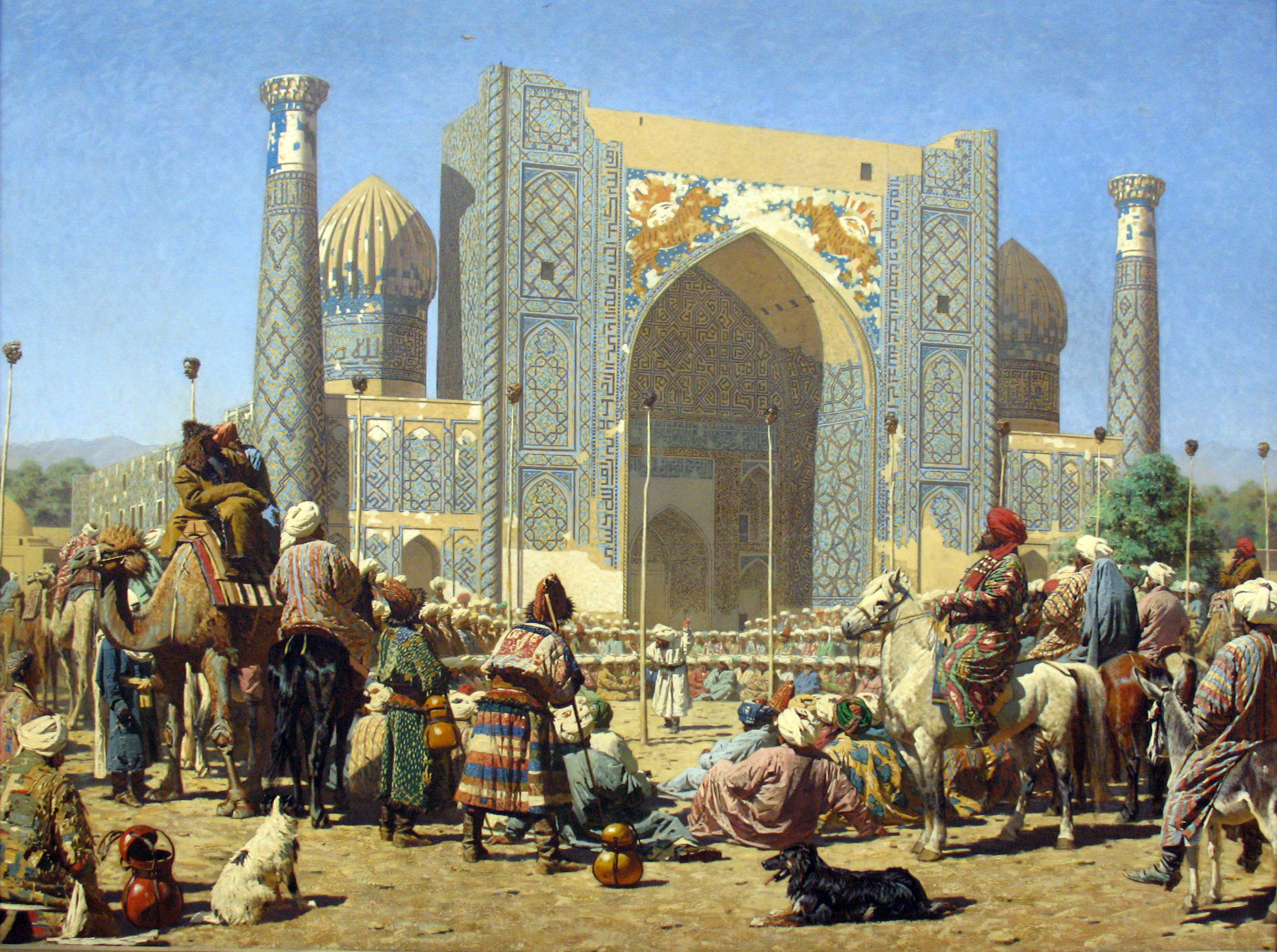
The Emir of Bukhara and the notables of the city watch how the heads of Russian soldiers are impaled on poles. Samarkand

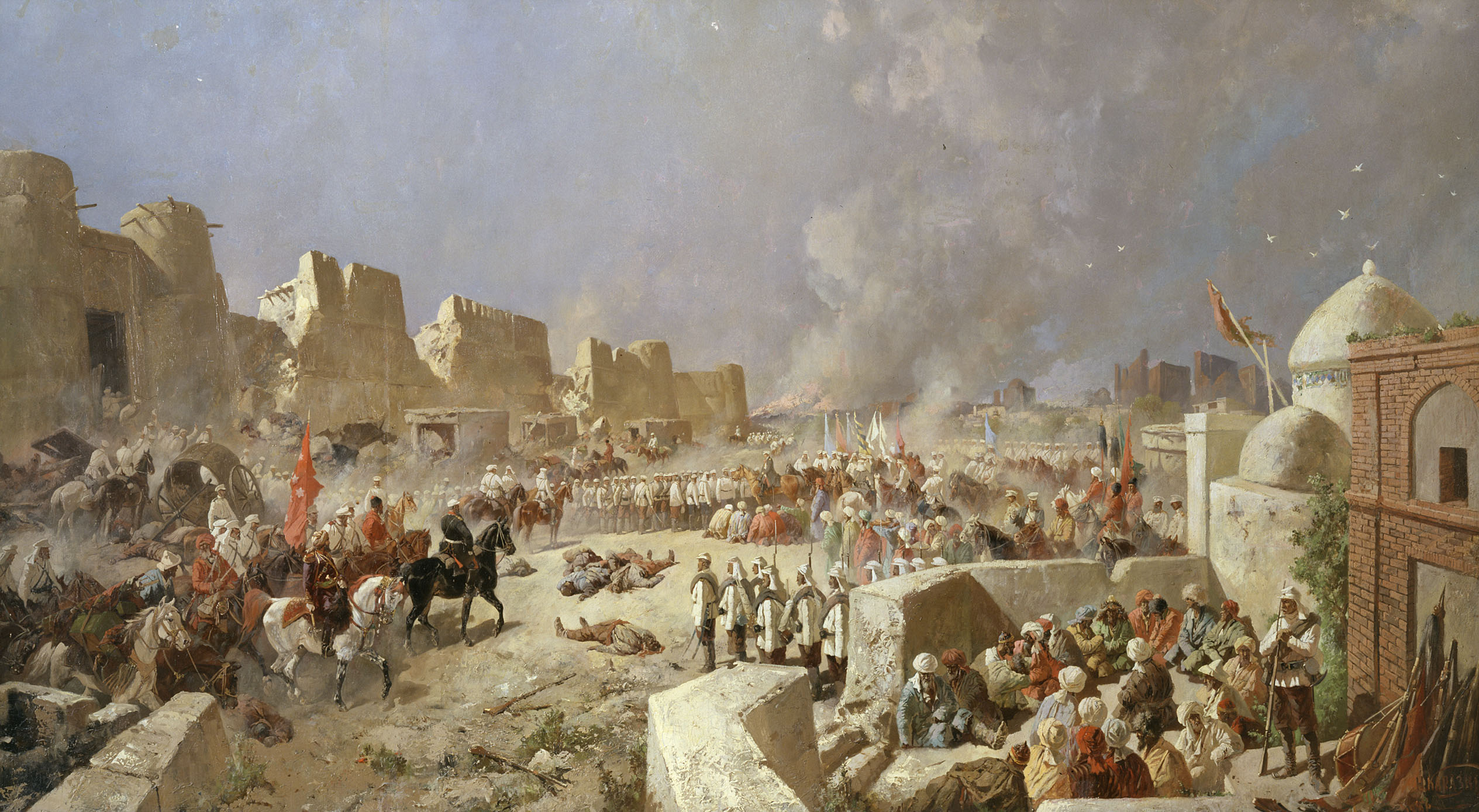
Russian troops taking Samarkand in 1868

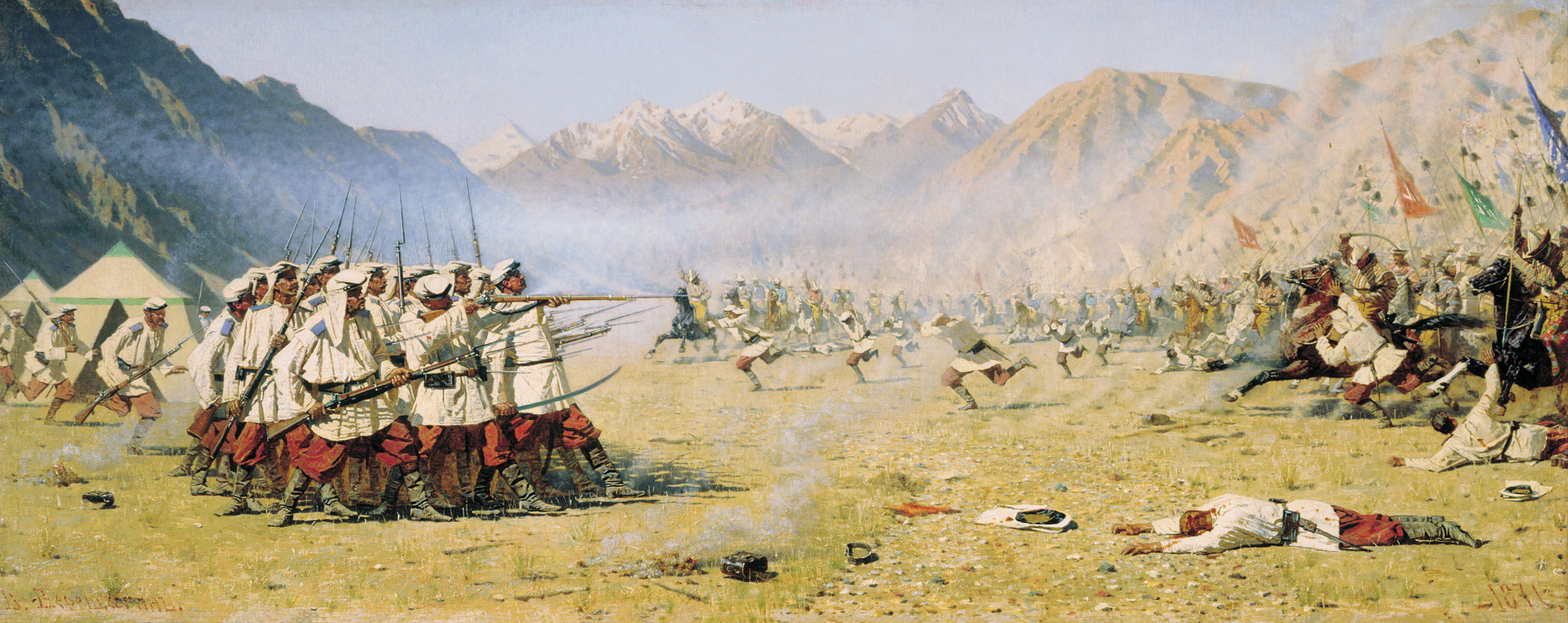
They Attack Unaware

== Soviet Central Asia (1918–1991) ==
Soviet Central Asia refers to the section of Central Asia formerly controlled by the Soviet Union, as well as the time period of Soviet administration (1918–1991). Central Asian SSRs declared independence in 1991. In terms of area, it is nearly synonymous with Russian Turkestan, the name for the region during the Russian Empire. The first years of the Soviet regime saw the appearance of modernism, which took inspiration from the Russian avant-garde movement. Until the 1980s, Central Asian arts had developed along with general tendencies of Soviet arts.

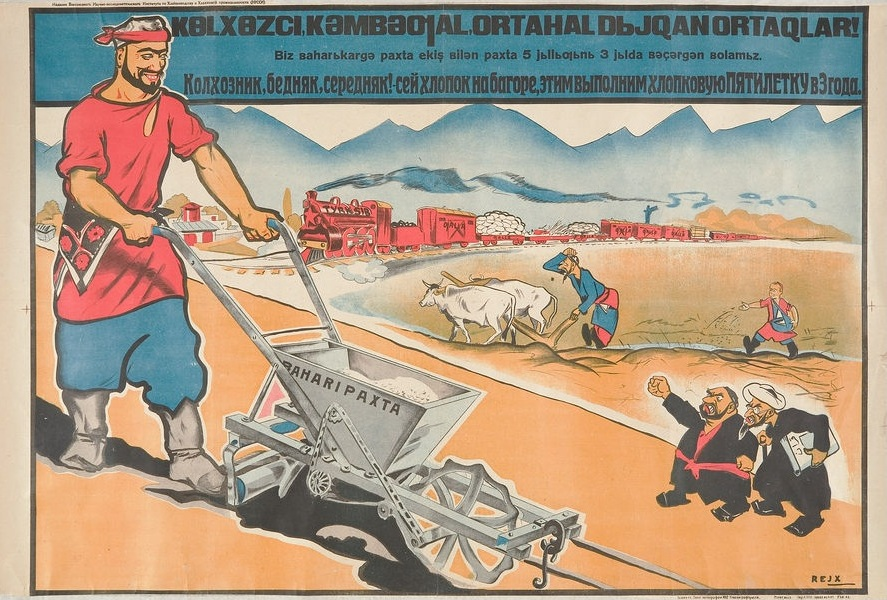
Urging peasants to speed up cotton production – Russian and Uzbek, Tashkent, 1920s

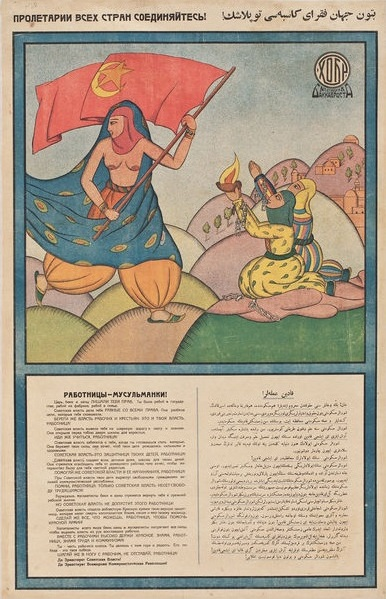
"Female Muslims- The tsar, beys and khans took your rights away" – Azeri, Baku, 1921 (Mardjani).

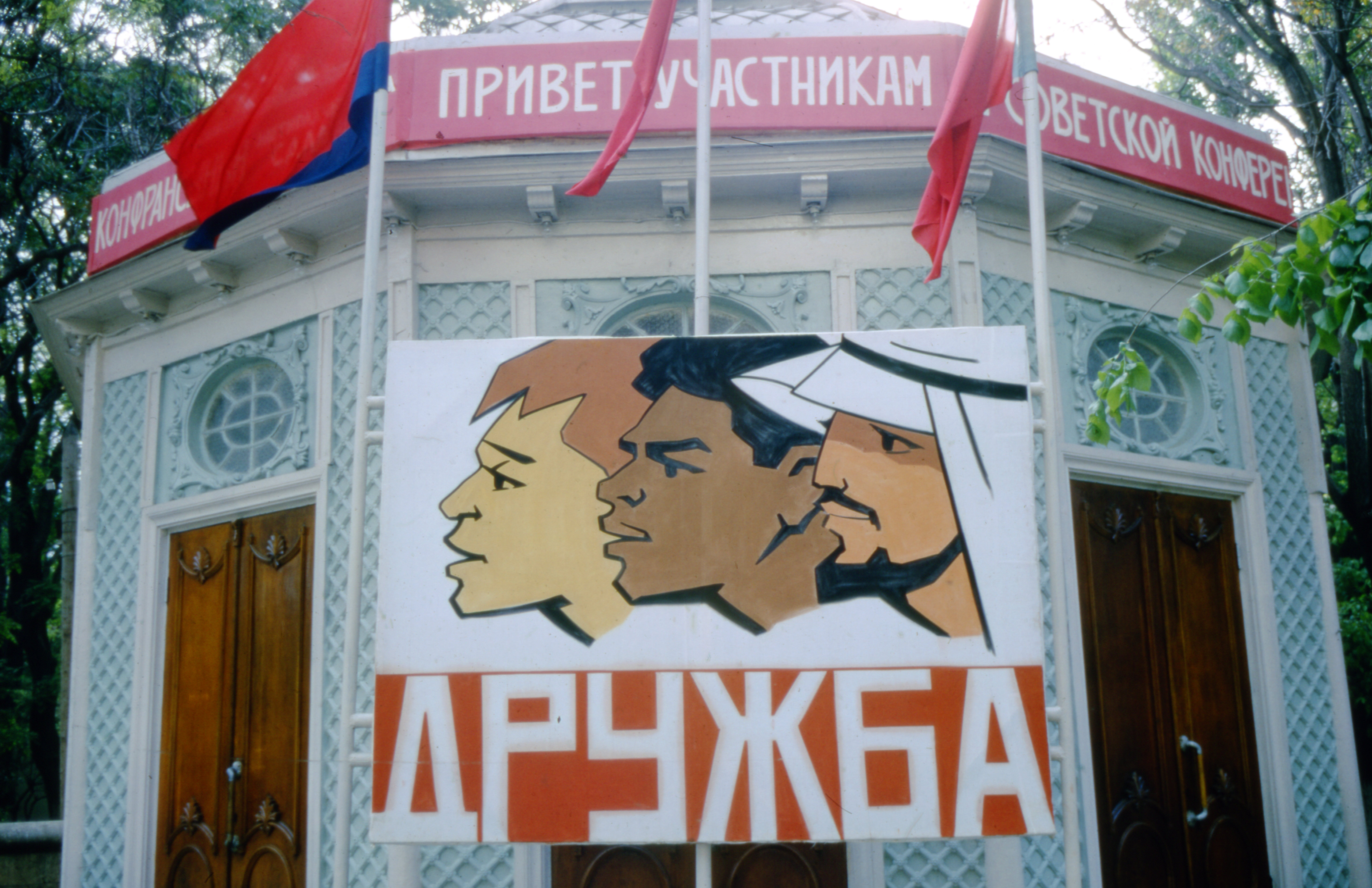
Poster of 3 different men with the word "friendship" underneath. Central Asia

Emblem of the Turkmen SSR.

== Contemporary period ==
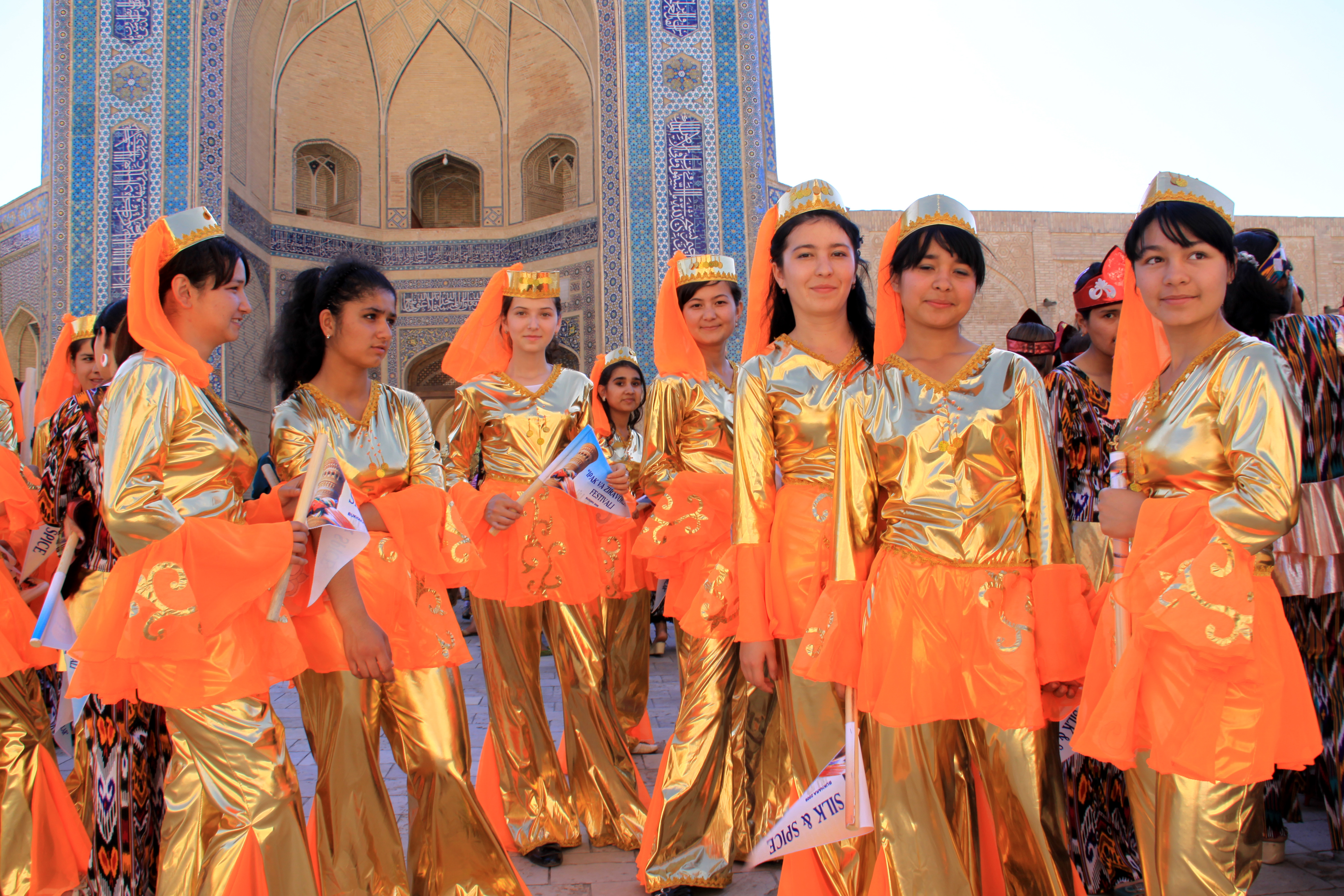
Uzbekistan, Bukhara, Spices and silk festival

In the 90s, arts of the region underwent some significant changes. Institutionally speaking, some fields of arts were regulated by the birth of the art market, some stayed as representatives of official views, while many were sponsored by international organizations. The years of 1990–2000 were times for the establishment of contemporary arts. In the region, many important international exhibitions are taking place, Central Asian art is represented in European and American museums, and the Central Asian Pavilion at the Venice Biennale has been organized since 2005.

== See also ==
- Architecture of Central Asia

== Sources ==
- Arjomand, Said Amir (2012). "Patrimonial state". In Böwering, Gerhard; Crone, Patricia; Mirza, Mahan (eds.). The Princeton Encyclopedia of Islamic Political Thought. Princeton University Press.
- Beckwith, Christopher I. (2009). Empires of the Silk Road: A History of Central Asia from the Bronze Age to the Present. Princeton University Press. ISBN 978-0-691-15034-5.
- Bosworth, C.E. (1963). The Ghaznavids:994–1040. Edinburgh University Press.
- Bosworth, C.E. (1968). "The Development of Persian Culture under the Early Ghaznavids". Iran. 6. Taylor & Francis, Ltd.: 33–44. doi:10.2307/4299599. JSTOR 4299599.
- Bosworth, C.E. (2006). "Ghaznavids". Encyclopaedia Iranica.
- Cribb, Joe (2010). Alram, M. (ed.). "The Kidarites, the numismatic evidence.pdf". Coins, Art and Chronology Ii, Edited by M. Alram et al. Coins, Art and Chronology II: 91–146.
- Hansen, Valerie (2012). The Silk Road: a new history. Oxford University Press. ISBN 978-0-195-15931-8.
- Jordana, Xavier (2009). "The warriors of the steppes: osteological evidence of warfare and violence from Pazyryk tumuli in the Mongolian Altai". Journal of Archaeological Science. 36 (7): 1319–1327. Bibcode:2009JArSc..36.1319J. doi:10.1016/j.jas.2009.01.008.
- Kim, Hyun Jin (2015). The Huns. Routledge. ISBN 9781138841758.
- Levi, Scott Cameron; Sela, Ron, eds. (2010). Islamic Central Asia: an anthology of historical sources. Indiana University Press.
- Li, Chunxiang; Li, Hongjie; Cui, Yinqiu; Xie, Chengzhi; Cai, Dawei; Li, Wenying; Mair, Victor H; Xu, Zhi; Zhang, Quanchao; Abuduresule, Idelisi; Jin, Li; Zhu, Hong; Zhou, Hui (December 2010). "Evidence that a West-East admixed population lived in the Tarim Basin as early as the early Bronze Age". BMC Biology. 8 (1): 15. Bibcode:2010BMCB....8...15L. doi:10.1186/1741-7007-8-15. PMC 2838831. PMID 20163704.
- Maenchen-Helfen, Otto J. (1973). Knight, Max (ed.). The World of the Huns: Studies in Their History and Culture. University of California Press. ISBN 978-0-520-01596-8.
- Maenchen-Helfen, Otto J. (1959). "The Ethnic Name Hun". In Egerod, Soren (ed.). Studia Serica Bernhard Karlgren dedicata. Copenhagen. pp. 223–238.
- Mallory, J. P.; Mair, Victor H. (2000). The Tarim Mummies: Ancient China and the Mystery of the Earliest Peoples from the West. Thames & Hudson. ISBN 978-0-500-05101-6.
- NOVA (2007). "Ice Mummies: Siberian Ice Maiden". PBS - NOVA.
- Rezakhani, Khodadad (2017). "East Iran in Late Antiquity". ReOrienting the Sasanians: East Iran in Late Antiquity. Edinburgh University Press. pp. 1–256. ISBN 9781474400305. JSTOR 10.3366/j.ctt1g04zr8. (registration required)
- State Hermitage Museum (2007). "Prehistoric Art - Early Nomads of the Altaic Region". The Hermitage Museum. Archived from the original on 2007-06-22.
- Thompson, E. A. (1996). Heather, Peter (ed.). The Huns. Blackwell Publishers. ISBN 978-0-631-15899-8.
- Walter, Mariko Namba (1998). "Tocharian Buddhism in Kucha: Buddhism of Indo-European Centum Speakers in Chinese Turkestan before the 10th Century C.E." (PDF). Sino-Platonic Papers. 85.
