= Tuan Andrew Nguyen =

Vietnamese-American artist (born 1976)

- Born: 1976 (age 49–50); Saigon - Gia Định, Republic of South Vietnam
- Education: California Institute of the Arts, University of California, Irvine
- Known for: Video, film, sculpture, installation art
- Awards: Joan Miró Prize, VIA Art Fund
- Website: Tuan Andrew Nguyen

Tuan Andrew Nguyen, The Unburied Sounds of a Troubled Horizon (still), Single-channel video installation, 4k, color, 5.1 surround sound, 58 min., 2022.

Tuấn Andrew Nguyễn (also known as Tuan Andrew Nguyen) (born 1976) is a Vietnamese-American artist known for moving-image works, sculptures and installations. His work taps into counter-memory, testimony and dialogue as forms of political resistance and empowerment, highlighting unofficial and underrepresented histories involving the fragmented consciousness of colonial inheritance and the cultural estrangement of expatriation and repatriation. He interweaves factual and speculative elements—archival resources, fiction, explorations of material memory embedded in objects (animism), and supernatural realms—in order to rework dominant narratives into poetic vignettes that imagine alternate forms of healing, survival and political potentiality. In 2023, New York Times critic Roberta Smith wrote, "Nguyen is a documentarian and an assembler of broken things with a preference for collaboration. His work aims to heal the fragmented lives and retrieve the suppressed memories of the marginalized people most affected by colonization, war and displacement, especially in Vietnam." In 2025 he was named a MacArthur Fellow by the MacArthur Foundation.

Nguyen's work belongs to the public art collections of the Museum of Modern Art, Solomon R. Guggenheim Museum, Singapore Art Museum and San Francisco Museum of Modern Art (SFMOMA), among others. In 2023, he received the Joan Miró Prize. He has exhibited at international exhibitions and film festivals including the Whitney Biennial, Sharjah Biennial, Berlin Biennale and Manifesta, and a solo show at the New Museum. He is a cofounding member of the artist collective The Propeller Group and is based in Ho Chi Minh City, Vietnam.

== Early life and career ==
Nguyen was born in 1976 in Sài Gòn - Gia Định. He and his family emigrated as refugees to the United States in 1979, and he grew up in Oklahoma and then Southern California. Initially a pre-med student, he earned a BFA from the University of California, Irvine in 1999. As an undergraduate he developed an inclination toward collective artmaking as a member of a graffiti crew; this would solidify in his later work with The Propeller Group and solo projects with various ethnic communities. He continued his art studies at California Institute of the Arts under Daniel Joseph Martinez, earning an MFA in 2004.

That same year Nguyen returned to Vietnam and settled in Ho Chi Minh City, in part out of a desire to understand and learn from his grandmother, who became a writer and published poet there at a young age. After the move, the country and its trials became a recurrent subject in his work. Nguyen's early exhibitions included solo shows at Voz Alta Projects (San Diego, 2004) and Galerie Quynh (Ho Chi Minh City, 2008), the 2006 Asia Pacific Triennial, and screenings at international and experimental film festivals. He cofounded the artist-run alternative space Sàn Art in Ho Chi Minh City in 2007.

=== The Propeller Group ===
In 2006, Nguyen co-founded The Propeller Group (TPG) with artist Phunam Thuc Ha; they were joined by Matt Lucero in 2008. For roughly a decade, TPG was the focus of Nguyen's efforts with large-scale collaborative projects that bridged fine art and mainstream media, including online viral campaigns, film productions, television commercials and installation art. TPG's work often combined contradictory concepts and strategies: public and private, political ideology and branding, low and high culture. The collective was featured in a traveling retrospective organized by the Museum of Contemporary Art Chicago (2016) and selected for the Guangzhou Triennial (2012), Venice Biennale (2015), and surveys at the Guggenheim Museum, New Museum and SFMOMA. In 2017, Phunam and Lucero withdrew from the group; Nguyen is still associated with TPG.

The contradictory concepts that Nguyen experimented with in The Propeller Group can be seen in their debut film AK-47 vs. M16, the Film that draws aesthetic influence from Hollywood, education documentaries, and utilizes YouTube clips in a 40-minute montage. These themes have been explored by Nguyen with The Propeller Group in various media, such as in Television Commercial for Communism, another video in 2011 released by the group, and then in the series of paintings, Proposal for a Vietnamese Landscape (2005-2006), and several of the collective’s films. The group has approached themes of continued American influence post-war and consumerism with what reviewers have characterized an irreverence and distinct from the melancholy tone that pervades over the reception of Vietnamese artists.

== Work and reception ==
Critics describe Nguyen's individual projects as more personal, subtler and more ambitious than his work with TPG. They draw upon both his own family's experience and the stories of others—Vietnamese-Senegalese people, the Aboriginal Ngurrara of Western Australia, migrants in Marseilles and endangered animals, among others. His projects have remained collaborative, as well as participatory, directly engaging with communities to devise and enact narratives, intergenerational dialogues, personal accounts and performances. The resulting works have been noted for their reflective, multi-perspectival character, lack of didacticism and refusal to reduce or erase cultural contradictions.

Tuan Andrew Nguyen, A Rising Moon Through The Smoke, 12 plate bells with 10th from bottom made of cast brass artillery shell, remaining 11 plate bells cast from 15% UXO bomb metal and 85% stainless steel; 149.625" x 118.125" x 118.125", 2022.

Nguyen frequently combines moving images and objects in his installations. His videos and films have dramatized paradoxes involving belief, mythology, decolonial politics, cultural legacies, consumerism and ecology. According to Artforum critic Murtaza Vali, Nguyen's sculptural work "seeks to give visibility and voice to displaced and marginalized communities, often through 'testimonial objects,' i.e., physical repositories of memory that retain the agency to narrate these recollections." For example, he has repurposed objects ranging from decorative animal statuary to salvaged bombshells from the American war in Vietnam (1955–75) in order to examine the traumas of war and extinction (e.g., A Rising Moon Through The Smoke, 2022). His Enemy's Enemy: A Monument to a Monument (2009) consisted of a baseball bat with the image of Buddhist monk Thich Quang Duc's 1963 self-immolating protest against the US-backed South Vietnamese government carved into it; the sculpture commented on cultural inheritance, a newly unveiled official monument to the event, and the use of such objects to serve political exigencies.

Since 2017, Nguyen has had solo exhibitions at institutions including the Asia Society, Joslyn Art Museum, Ulrich Museum, Centre for Contemporary Arts in Glasgow and New Museum ("Radiant Remembrance," 2023), among others; the New Museum exhibition was featured on the PBS NewsHour in August 2023. He has also shown at the James Cohan Gallery in New York and Galerie Quynh.

== Individual works and exhibitions ==
In his expansive exhibition "Empty Forest" (2017, Factory Contemporary Arts Center), Nguyen examined the complex, relationship in Vietnam between humans and animals, one involving traditional mythology, contemporary ecology and capitalist consumption. Placed in dialogue with an otherworldly menagerie of strange hybrid creatures, the two-channel video My Ailing Beliefs Can Cure Your Wretched Desires (2017) examined the paradoxical connection between archaic medicinal and spiritual beliefs, illegal trade in endangered animals and the extinction of species. The video was set in both real and surreal landscapes and revolved around a fictional Socratic dialogue (in voiceover) between the wandering spirits of the last Javan rhinoceros (poached in 2010) and the last giant softshell turtle concerning political revolution against humans. The exhibition's objects—neoritualistic masks, costumes-sculptures and mutations of animal statues on altar-like pedestals bathed in eerie purple neon light—together suggested a chilling spirit forest haunted by violence, greed and devastation; the show's title, "Empty Forest," is an ecological term for viable ecosystems void of large mammals due to hunting, poaching or deforestation.

In the forty-minute video The Island (2017, Whitney Biennial), Nguyen collapsed past and future and questioned notions of identity, trauma, history and exile. The video was set on the tiny Malaysian island of Pulau Bidong—the largest refugee camp after the Vietnam War, now overgrown with jungle, where Nguyen and his family briefly stayed. The video mixed historical footage with a dystopian narrative about the last two humans on earth: a man who is the island's last inhabitant and a woman scientist who washes up on shore after witnessing a nuclear holocaust. The Boat People (2020) took up similar themes, while reclaiming the eponymous derogatory term. It juxtaposed hand-carved wooden objects with a video fable set in an unspecified post-apocalyptic future that portrayed a band of scrawny children in steampunk headdresses navigating the open seas in a whimsical yellow boat. They wade ashore a deserted, sun-dappled island and collect objects that survived over time, trying to piece together the stories and history of a world they never knew.

In two video installations, Nguyen considered communities created and divided by colonial conflict, specifically the First Indochina War (1946–54). The collaborative, four-channel video and photography work The Specter of Ancestors Becoming (2019) was commissioned for the Sharjah Biennial. Its imagined, real and poetic cross-cultural exchanges depicted intergenerational memories, desires and conflicts from the small Vietnamese-Senegalese population in Dakar—descendants of colonial Senegalese troops conscripted to fight for the French in the war (the tirailleurs sénégalais) who took Vietnamese wives and then returned. Because No One Living Will Listen (2023), a two-channel work using CGI, centered on a Vietnamese woman mourning her father, a Moroccan soldier and defector who died when she was a baby; its video screen was bounded on either side by white khaki fabric embroideries—enlarged versions of the propaganda pamphlets that Viet Minh insurgents dropped on French colonial troops urging them to defect.

Nguyen's "Unburied Sounds" (2022, James Cohan) was an exhibition of video and sculptural works (used in the video) crafted from fragments of discarded Vietnam War remnants. Weaving fiction, folkloric ghost stories, history and testimony, the show explored the ways in which material contains memory and holds potential for salvation, healing and reincarnation—often through transformation by art. The video, The Unburied Sounds of a Troubled Horizon, centered on a woman who runs a small junkyard with her mother on the outskirts of Quang Tri one of the most heavily bombed areas in history, still haunted by a legacy of death and dismemberment, physical residue and the ongoing danger of unexploded ordnance (UXO). The woman scavenges and sells the discarded war metals, but also compulsively transforms them into musical instruments with healing properties (e.g., the temple gong sculpture, Unexploded Resonance) and mobiles that seem to channel the aesthetics and perhaps the spirit of sculptor Alexander Calder, who campaigned against the war in the 1960s.

From August 22, 2024, to July 20, 2025, Nguyen presented a solo exhibition titled The Other Side of Now at the Zeitz Museum of Contemporary Art Africa in Cape Town. The showcase explored the erased histories and transnational impacts of colonialism through three films and several sculptural relics, including singing bowls forged from discarded brass artillery shells.

Nguyen's statue of Buddha, The Light That Shines Through the Universe, is on display from Spring 2026 to Fall 2027 as the Plinth commission for the High Line in New York City. The 27-foot-tall sandstone statue and two bronze hands pay homage to the now-destroyed Bamiyan Buddhas of Afghanistan which were destroyed by the Taliban in March 2001.

== Collections and awards ==
Nguyen's work belongs to the public art collections of The Burger Collection (Switzerland), Carré d’Art (Musée d’art contemporain de Nîmes, France), Colección Diéresis (México), Kadist, Kemper Art Museum, Museum of Fine Arts, Houston, Museum of Modern Art, Philadelphia Museum of Art, Queensland Art Gallery and Gallery of Modern Art (QAGOMA), Singapore Art Museum, San Francisco Museum of Modern Art, Smithsonian American Art Museum, Solomon R. Guggenheim Museum and Whitney Museum, among others. He received the Joan Miró Prize (2023), a VIA Art Fund acquisition grant (2020), a Civitella Ranieri Foundation fellowship (2019), and an artist residency from Bellas Artes (2019, Bataan, Philippines).

On October 8, 2025, Nguyen was awarded a MacArthur Foundation Fellowship, popularly known as the MacArthur Foundation's “Genius Grant.”
