= Bamiyan (disambiguation) =

Bamiyan may refer to:

- Bamiyan Province, Afghanistan
- Bamiyan, the capital of Bamiyan Province
- The Buddhas of Bamyan, ancient gigantic statues, now destroyed
