= The Light That Shines Through the Universe =

Buddha statue by Tuan Andrew Nguyen

- Artist: Tuan Andrew Nguyen
- Year: 2026
- Medium: Sandstone
- Location: New York City; 40°45′08″N 74°00′04″W

The Light That Shines Through the Universe by Tuan Andrew Nguyen is a 27-foot-tall sandstone sculpture depicting Buddha and two metallic hands and part of its face removed. The work pays homage to the 6th-century Bamiyan Buddhas of Afghanistan that were destroyed by the Taliban in March 2001.

The work was selected as the 5th High Line Plinth commission, for Spring 2026.

== Inspiration ==
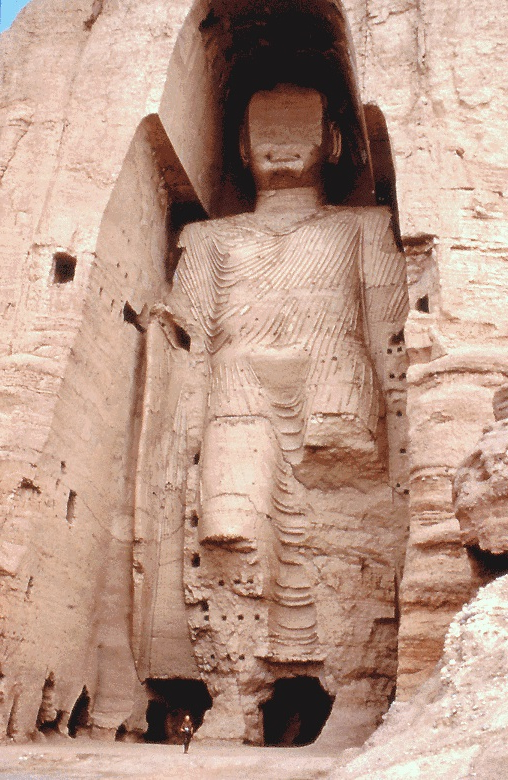
Taller Bamiyan Buddha pre-destruction

The work takes heavy inspiration from the Bamiyan Buddhas: two massive 6th-century in situ statues with a surrounding mandorla-like niche, the smaller of which, at 115 feet tall, depicting the Sakyamuni (historical) Buddha, and the larger, at 175 feet tall, depicting the Vairocana (universal) Buddha. These Buddhas, located on Silk Road pilgrimage site Bamiyan, Afghanistan, was an important trading and religious center. The complex features many gave galleries and passageways leading up the statues' shoulders similar to the niches that fill the lower body of Nguyen's statue.

The Bamiyan Buddhas were often affectionately called "Salsal" by the locals. This translate to "the light shines through the universe," which inspired the name of work.

The Bamiyan Buddhas were destroyed by the Taliban during the Afghan Civil War as both an act of iconoclasm and anger towards the prioritization of the protection of inanimate objects over humanitarian aid in the nation. The destruction of the statues was of great inspiration for Nguyen and explains the removal of the upper front of the statue's face.

Nguyen is a Vietnamese-American artist who took inspiration from the Vietnam War, its tragedy and long-lasting effects, in the symbolism behind this artwork.

== Subject and meaning ==
While the core subject is the tall sandstone sculpture, there are additional bronze hands that are held up by poles and separated for the main body. These hands were made from melted-down brass artillery shells reflecting the unexploded ordnances left after the Vietnam War and other large-scale military tragedies. The hands are placed into mudras into the Abhayamudra, symbolizing fearlessness, and Varadamudrā, symbolizing compassion. The gap between the hands and the body reflect the irreparability of some damages despite hope and potential of healing. His work is intended not as an "exact replica" but an "echo" with intent to invoke the collective memory of the Bamiyan Buddhas and their destruction.

Nguyen uses the sculpture as a counterpoint to political radicalism, nihilism, iconoclasm; according to the Director & Chief Curator of High Line Art, Cecilia Alemani:

It stands today as a powerful and poetic counterpoint to extremism and iconoclasm we continue to witness globally. By resurrecting the memory of the lost Bamiyan Buddhas, The Light That Shines Through the Universe reminds us that cultural treasures—and shared history—can transcend physical destruction.

The Light That Shines Through the Universe currently resides on the Plinth in the High Line in New York City, replacing the previous 16-foot-tall statue of a pigeon, Dinosaur by Iván Argote
