= Galerie Quynh =

Galerie Quynh is a commercial art gallery of contemporary art located in Ho Chi Minh City, Vietnam. Galerie Quynh is considered to be Ho Chi Minh City's "main commercial space" and a "leading contemporary commercial venue." Founded by Quynh Pham and Robert Cianchi in 2000 as an online resource of Vietnamese art, the gallery has since evolved into a physical site that "presents some of Vietnam's most inspiring and rigorous practitioners." The gallery mounts a new exhibition that varies from solo retrospectives to themed group shows every one or two months. In December of 2009, the gallery had an exhibition of works by Bruce Yonemoto, a Los-Angeles based Japanese-American artist, that further solidified its position in the international art world.

In May 2014, the gallery founded the not-for-profit educational initiative Sao La directed by artists Tung Mai and Nguyen Kim To Lan. Sao La has since evolved into an independent artist collective spearheaded by To Lan and Dalat-based artist Nguyen Duc Dat.
