= Buddhas of Bamiyan =

Sculptures in Afghanistan before 2001

UNESCO World Heritage Site
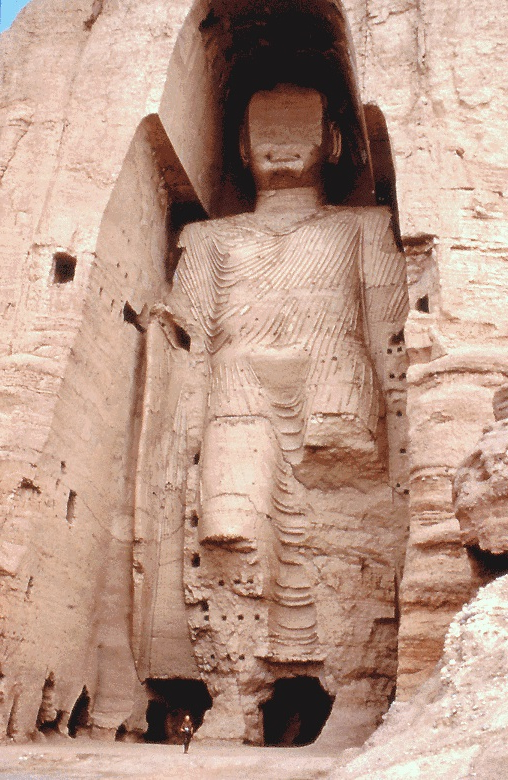
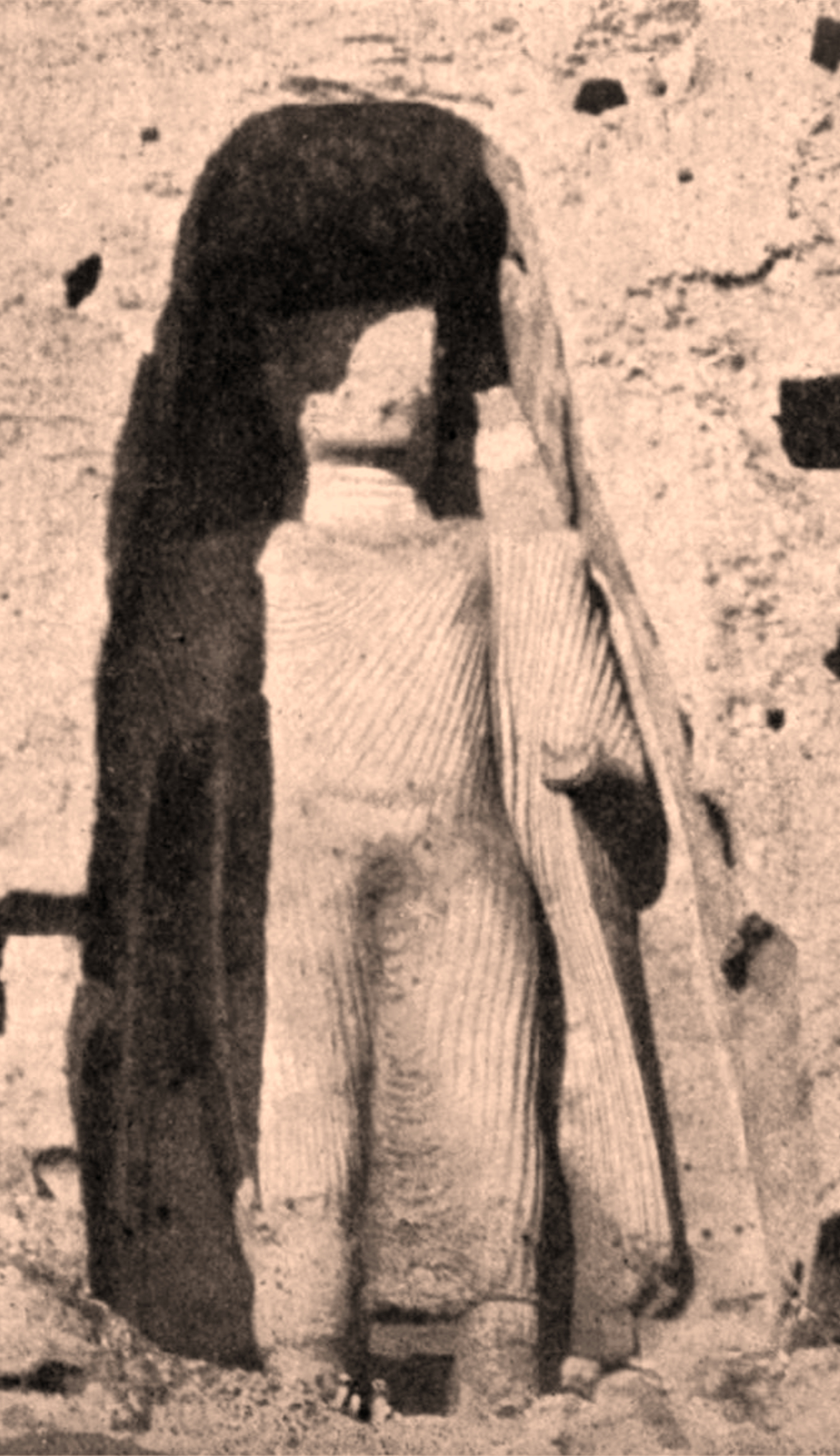
- 55-metre (180 ft) "Western Buddha" 38-metre (125 ft) "Eastern Buddha" Carbon dating indicates the Western Buddha was built c. 591–644 CE and the Eastern Buddha c. 544–595.

- Location within Afghanistan
- Location: Bamiyan, Afghanistan
- Part of: Cultural Landscape and Archaeological Remains of the Bamyan Valley
- Criteria: Cultural: i, ii, iii, iv, vi.
- Reference: 208
- Inscription: 2003 (27th Session)
- Endangered: 2003–present
- Area: 105 ha (260 acres)
- Buffer zone: 225.25 ha (556.6 acres)
- Coordinates: 34.8320°N 67.8267°E

The Buddhas of Bamiyan (Note: Pashto: د باميانو بودايي پژۍ Dari: تندیس‌های بودا در بامیان) were two monumental Buddhist reliefs in the Bamiyan Valley of what is now Afghanistan, carved possibly around the 6th-century. Located 130 kilometres (81 mi) to the northwest of Kabul, at an elevation of 2,500 metres (8,200 ft), carbon dating of the structural components of the Buddhas has determined the smaller 38 m (125 ft) "Eastern Buddha" was built around 570 CE, and the larger 55 m (180 ft) "Western Buddha" was built around 618, which would date both to the time when the Hephthalites ruled the region.

In March 2001, both structures were destroyed by the Taliban following an order given on February 26, 2001, by Taliban leader Mullah Muhammad Omar, to destroy all the statues in Afghanistan "so no one can worship or respect them in the future". International and local opinion condemned the destruction of the Buddhas. Inscribed in 2003 as part of a UNESCO World Heritage Site, the Buddhas are recognized as an outstanding expression of Gandharan Buddhism. In the meantime, the Taliban conducted several days of massacre of the Hazaras − a regional ethnic minority − going door to door, killing men, women, and children. Homes, markets, trees, graveyards, and other cultural sites of Hazaras were all destroyed. Hazara community leaders later claimed that as many as 15,000 people were massacred by the Taliban.

The sculptures represented a later evolution of the classic blended style of Greco-Buddhist art at Gandhara. The larger structure was named "Salsal" ("the light shines through the universe") and was referred as a male. The smaller relief is called "Shah Mama" ("Queen Mother") and is considered as a female figure, but this cannot be said with certainty. The smaller statue predated the larger one. Technically, both were reliefs: at the rear, they each merged into the cliff wall. The main bodies were hewn directly from the sandstone cliffs, but details were modeled in mud mixed with straw, coated with stucco. This coating, the majority of which wore away long ago, was painted to enhance the expressions of the faces, hands, and folds of the robes; the larger one was painted carmine red, and the smaller one was painted multiple colours. The lower parts of the sculptures' arms were constructed from the same mud-straw mix, supported on wooden armatures. Current research indicates the upper parts of their faces consisted of huge wooden masks.

Since the 2nd century CE, Bamiyan had been a Buddhist religious site on the Silk Road under the Kushans, remaining so until the Islamic conquests of 770, and finally coming under the Turkic Ghaznavid rule in 977. In 1221, Genghis Khan during the Siege of Bamyan invaded the Bamiyan Valley, wiping out most of its population but leaving the Bamiyan Buddhas undamaged. Later in the 17th century, Mughal emperor Aurangzeb briefly ordered the use of artillery to destroy the carvings, causing some damage, though the Buddhas survived without any major harm.

The Buddhas were surrounded by numerous caves, the walls of which were decorated with paintings made during the 6th to 8th centuries. Archeological evidence suggests the cave painting ended after the Muslim conquests of Afghanistan. The smaller works of art are considered to be an artistic synthesis of Buddhist art and Gupta art from ancient India, with influences from the Sasanian Empire and the Byzantine Empire, as well as the Tokhara Yabghus.

== History ==
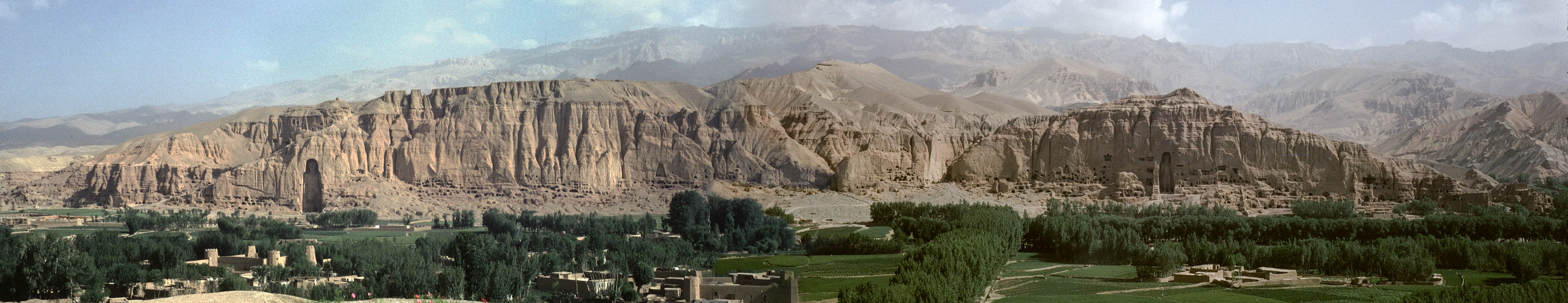
Panorama of the northern cliff of the Valley of Bamyan, with the Western and Eastern Buddhas at each end (before destruction), surrounded by a multitude of Buddhist caves.

=== Commissioning ===
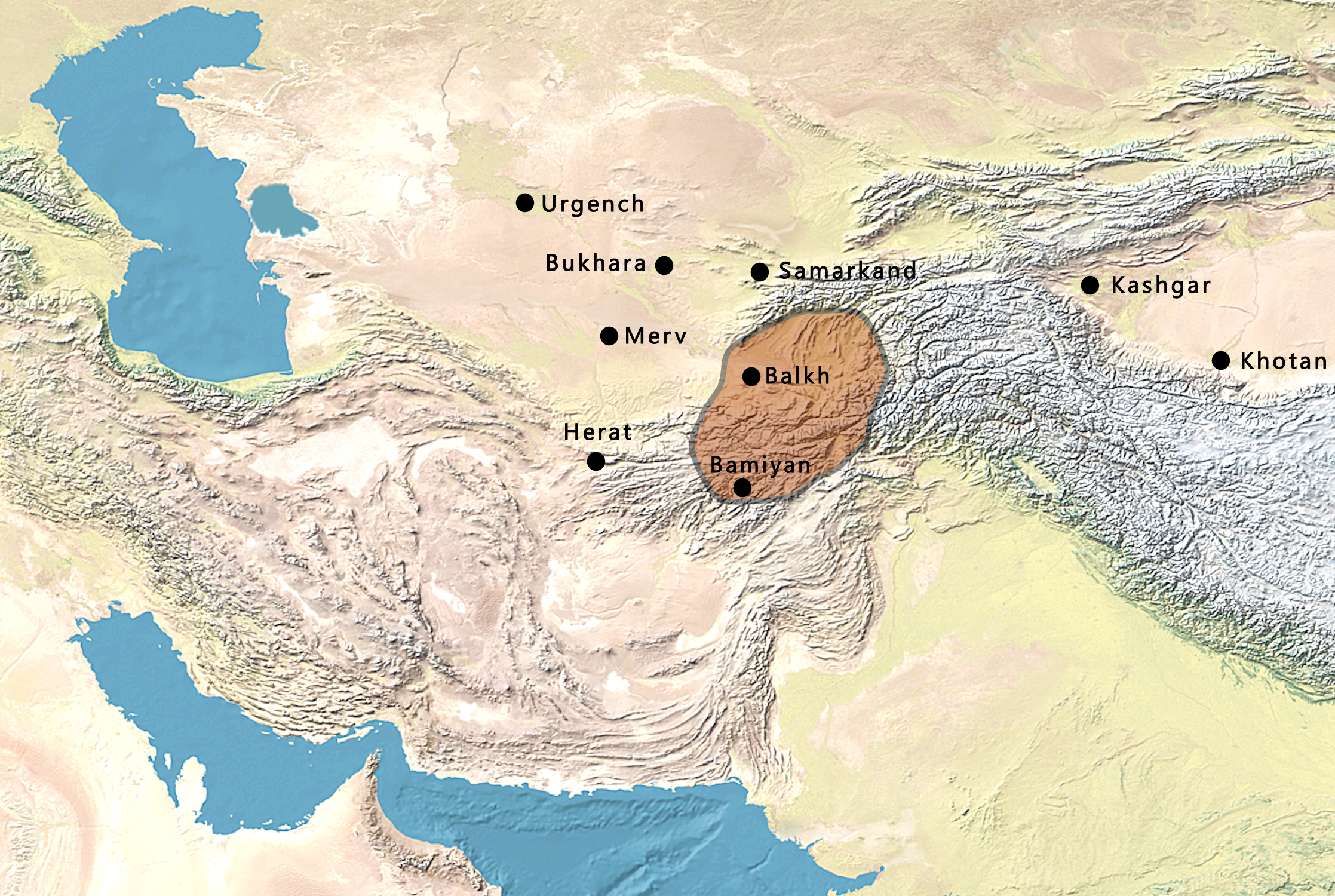
The Buddhas of Bamiyan were commissioned under the rule of the Hephthalite Principalities of Tokharistan and northern Afghanistan (c. 557-625 CE).

Bamiyan lies on the Silk Road, which runs through the Hindu Kush mountain region in the Bamiyan Valley. The Silk Road has been historically a caravan route linking the markets of China with those of the Western world. It was the site of several Buddhist monasteries, and a thriving center for religion, philosophy, and art. Monks at the monasteries lived as hermits in small caves carved into the side of the Bamyan cliffs. Most of these monks embellished their caves with religious statuary and elaborate, brightly colored frescoes, sharing the culture of Gandhara.

The Great Buddhas of Bamiyan were carved around 600 CE during the Hephthalites' rule as principalities in the areas of Tokharistan and northern Afghanistan. The Hephthalites did not always follow the Buddhist faith. For instance, during the time of Song Yun, who visited the chief of the Hephthalite nomads at his summer residence in Badakhshan and later in Gandhara, said they had no belief in the Buddhist law and served a large number of divinities." Bamiyan had been a Buddhist religious site since the 2nd century CE under the Kushans, and remained so up to the time of the Muslim conquest of the Abbasid Caliphate under Al-Mahdi in 770 CE. It became Buddhist again from 870 CE until the final Islamic conquest of 977 CE under the Turkic Ghaznavid dynasty. Murals in the adjoining caves have been carbon dated from 438 to 980 CE, suggesting Buddhist artistic activity continued down to the final occupation by the Muslims.

The two most prominent art works were the giant standing sculptures of the Buddhas Vairocana and Sakyamuni (Gautama Buddha), identified by the different mudras performed. The Buddha popularly called "Salsal" measured 55 meters tall, and "Shah Mama" 38 meters. The niches in which the figures stood are 58 and 38 meters respectively from bottom to top. Before being blown up in 2001, they were the largest examples of standing Buddha carvings in the world (the 8th century Leshan Giant Buddha is taller, but is sitting).

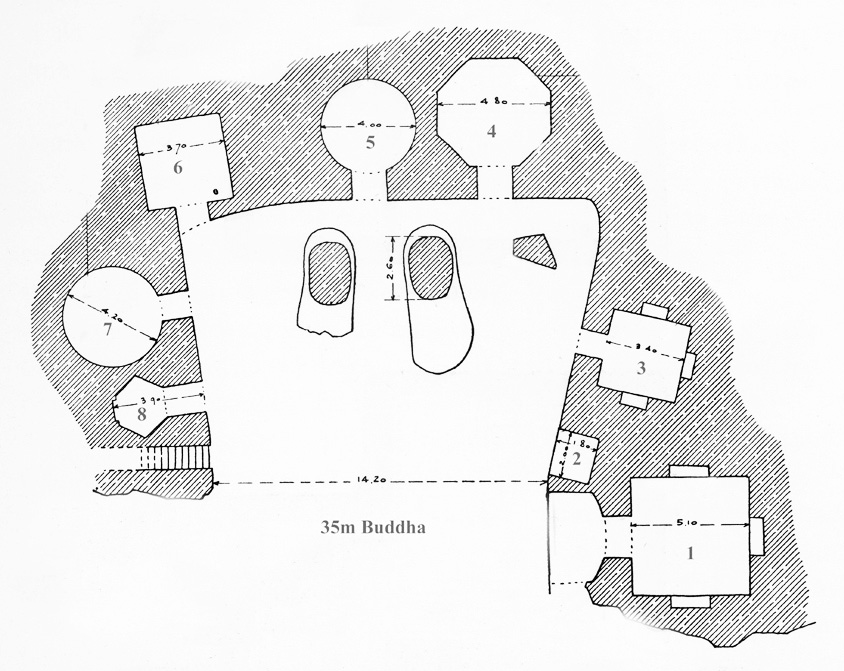
Mapping of the 38 meter smaller Eastern Buddha, dated to 591–644 CE, and its surrounding caves and chapels.

Following the destruction of the statues in 2001, carbon dating of organic internal structural components found in the rubble has determined the two Buddhas were built c. 600 CE, with narrow dates of between 544 and 595 CE for the 38-meter Eastern Buddha, and between 591 and 644 CE for the larger Western Buddha. Recent scholarship has also been giving broadly similar dates based on stylistic and historical analysis, although the similarities with the Art of Gandhara had generally encouraged an earlier dating in older literature.

Historic documentation refers to celebrations held every year attracting numerous pilgrims, with offers being made to the monumental statues. They were perhaps the most famous cultural landmarks of the region, and the site was listed by UNESCO as a World Heritage Site along with the surrounding cultural landscape and archaeological remains of the Bamyan Valley. Their colour faded through time.

=== Pre-modern era ===
Chinese Buddhist pilgrim Xuanzang visited the site on 30 April 630, and described Bamyan in the Da Tang Xiyu Ji as a flourishing Buddhist center "with more than ten monasteries and more than a thousand monks". He also noted both Buddha figures were "decorated with gold and fine jewels" (Wriggins, 1995). Intriguingly, Xuanzang mentions a third, even larger, reclining statue of the Buddha. A monumental seated Buddha, similar in style to those at Bamyan, still exists in the Bingling Temple caves in China's Gansu province.

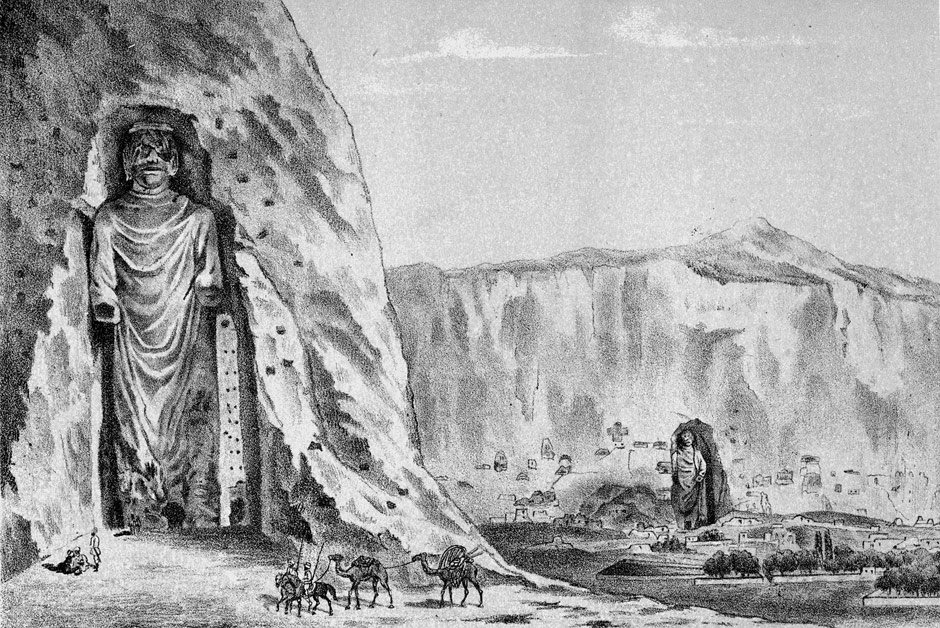
Engraving of the Buddhas, 19th century

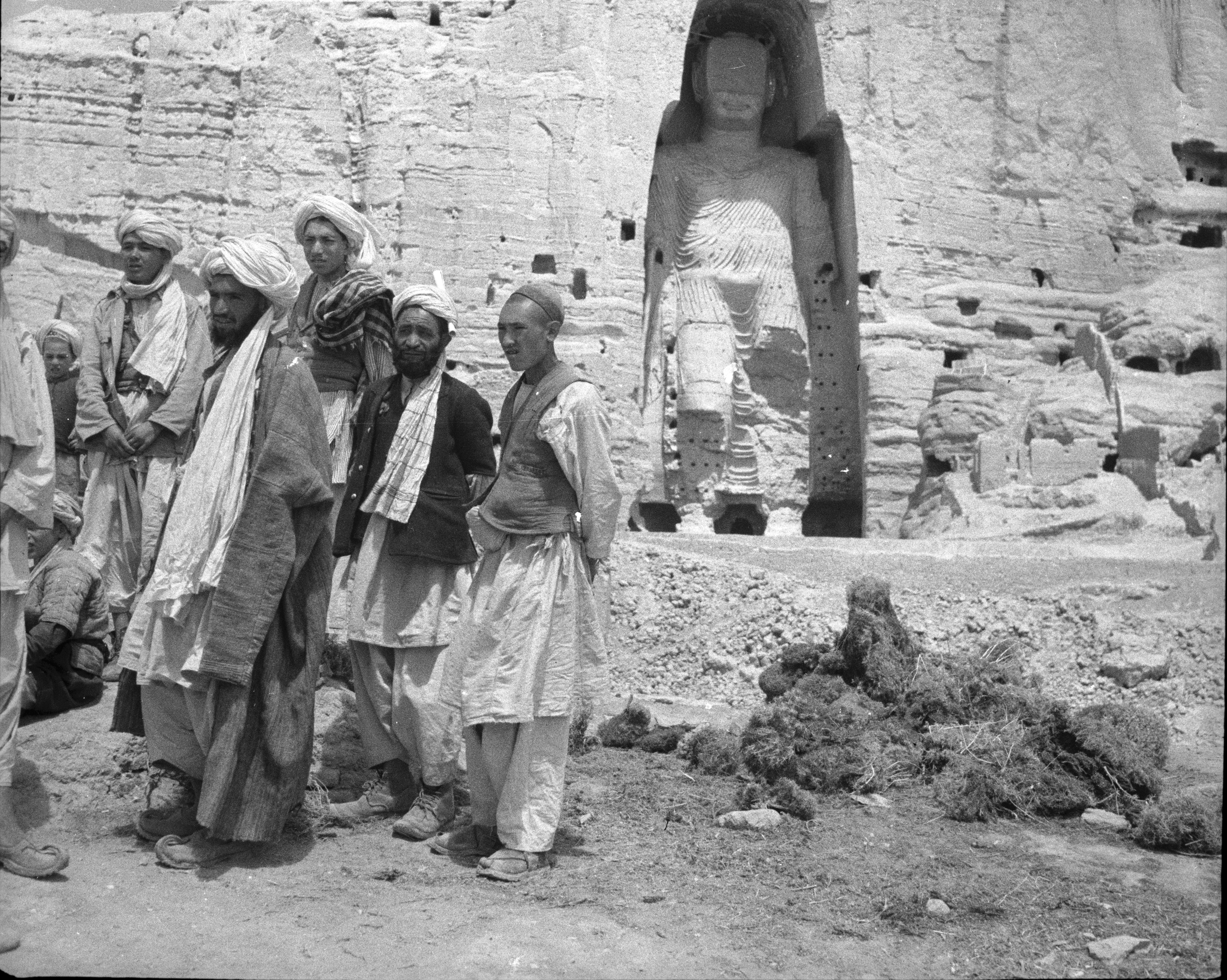
Local men standing near the larger "Salsal" Buddha statue, c. 1940

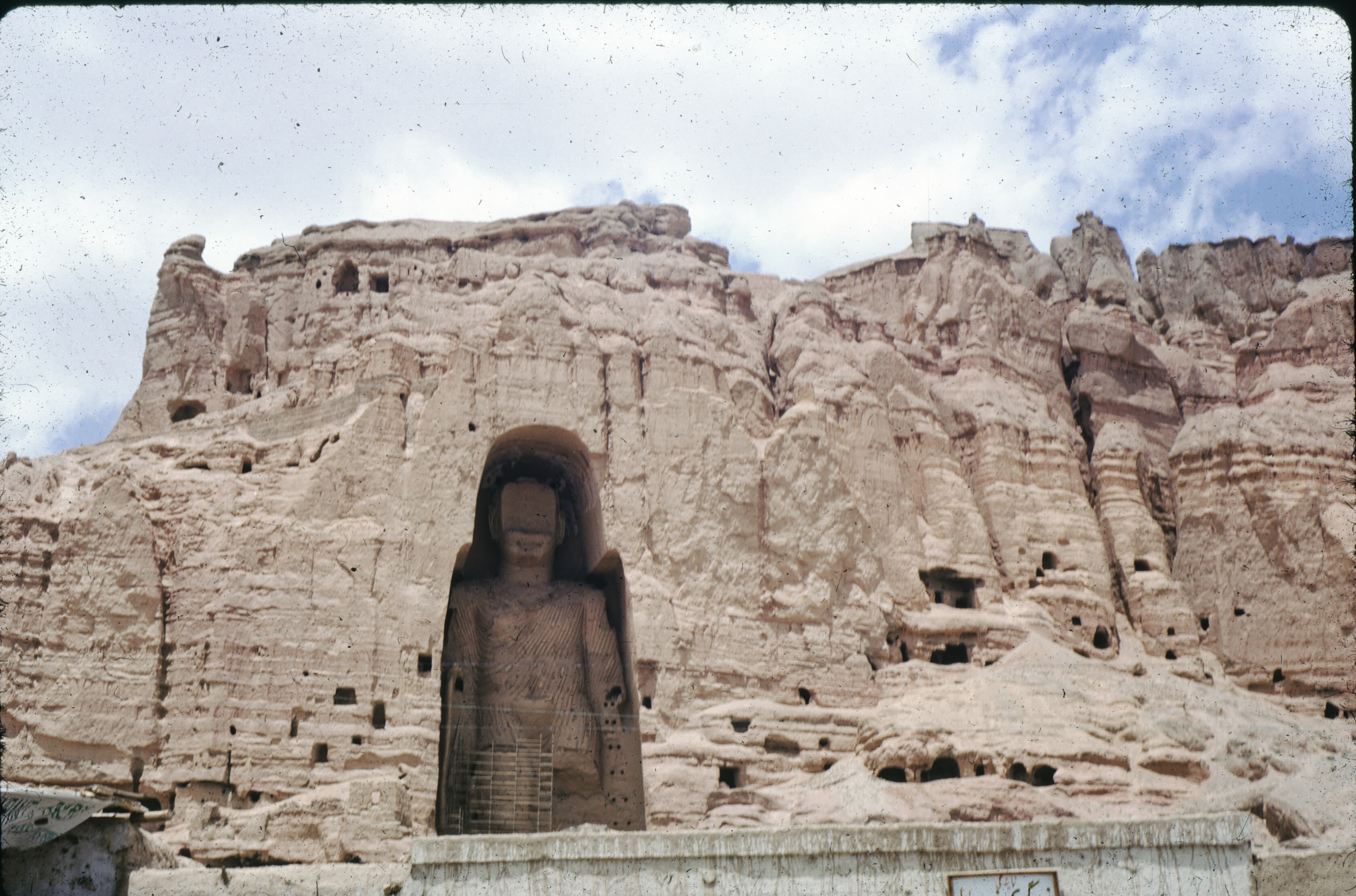
Photographed by Françoise Foliot

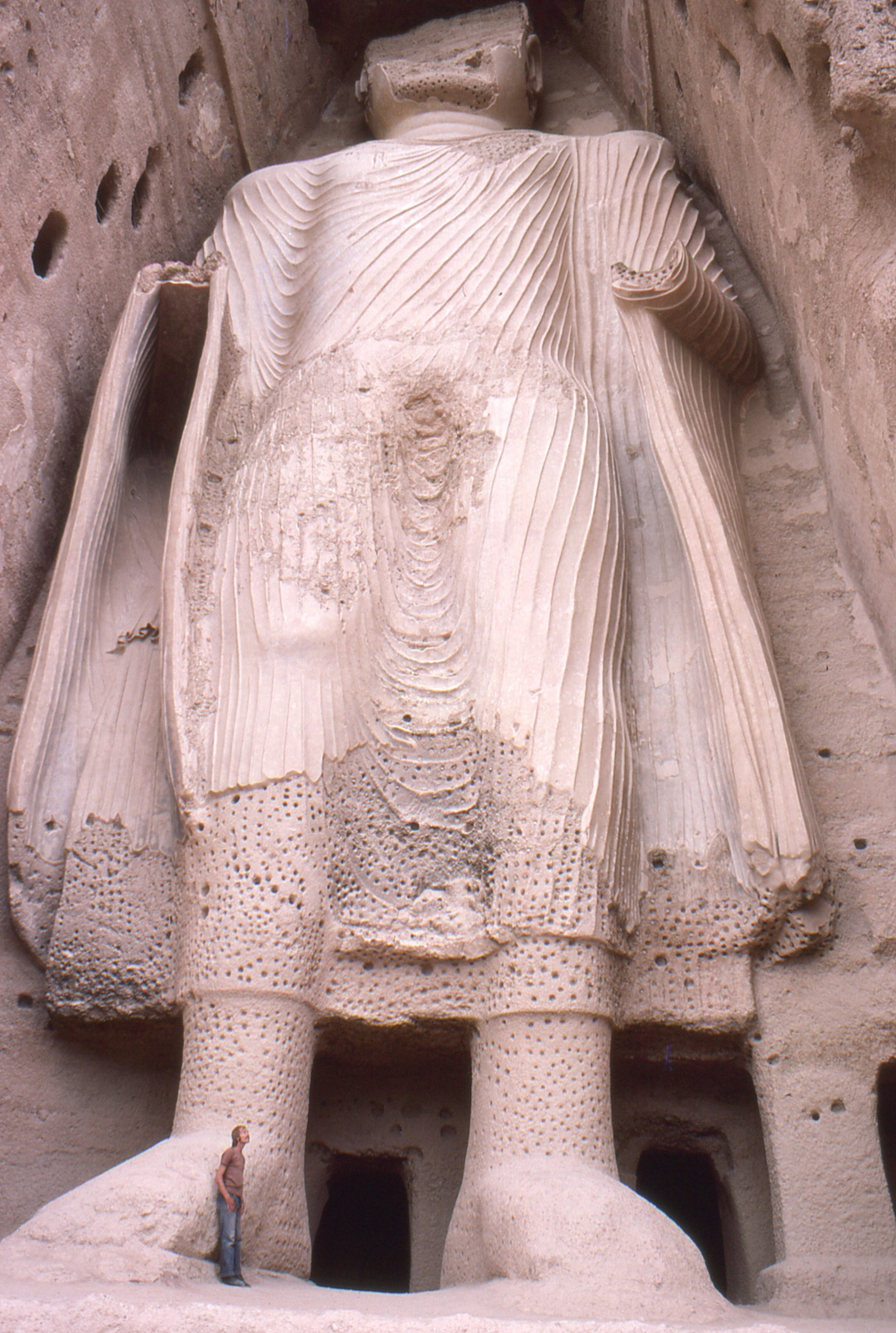
Smaller, 38 meter Buddha in 1977

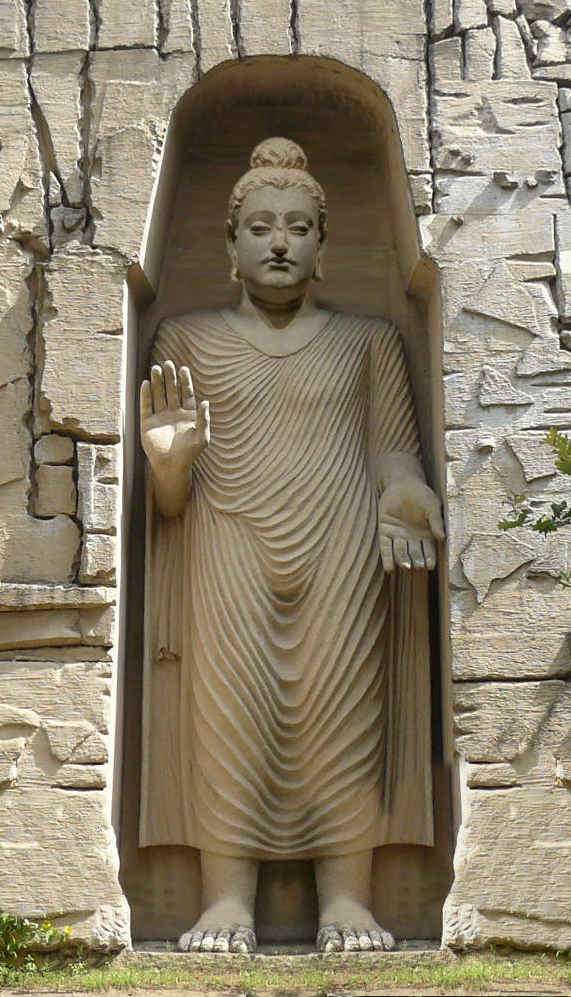
Possible reconstitution of the original appearance of the Western Buddha

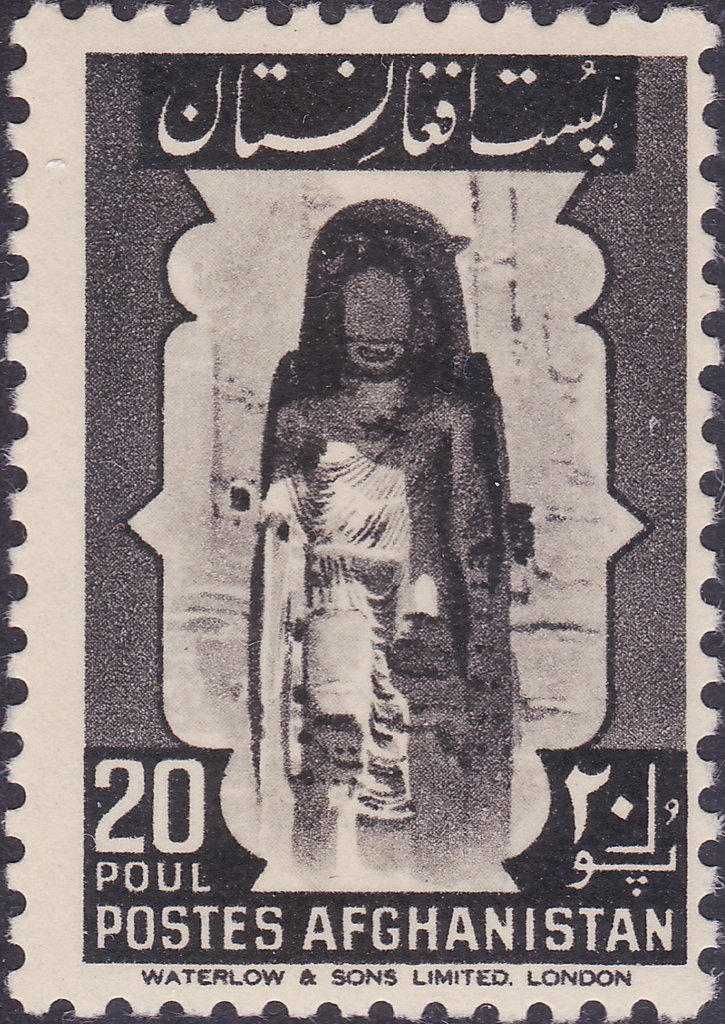
Bamiyan themed postage stamp (1951) issued by Postes Afghanes

== Mural paintings ==
The Buddhas are surrounded by numerous caves and surfaces decorated with paintings. It is thought that the period of florescence was from the 6th to 8th century CE, until the onset of Islamic invasions. These works of art are considered as an artistic synthesis of Buddhist art and Gupta art from India, with influences from the Sasanian Empire and the Byzantine Empire, as well as the country of Tokharistan. The later paintings are attributable to the "Turk period" (7th–9th century CE).

=== Eastern Buddha (built c. 544–595 CE) ===
Ceiling of the smaller 38 meter Buddha
(7th century CE)

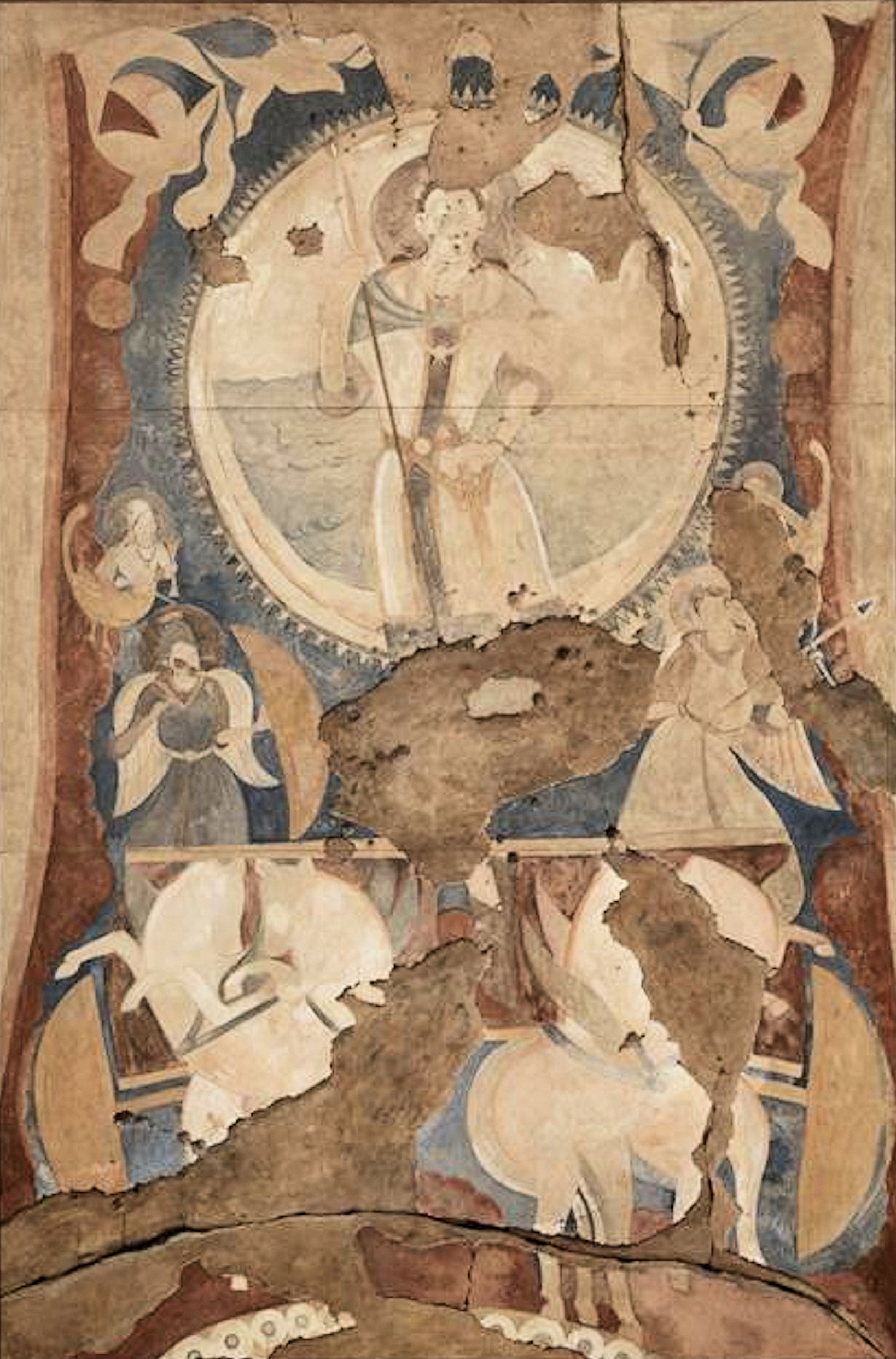
Central medallion: Sun God on his chariot

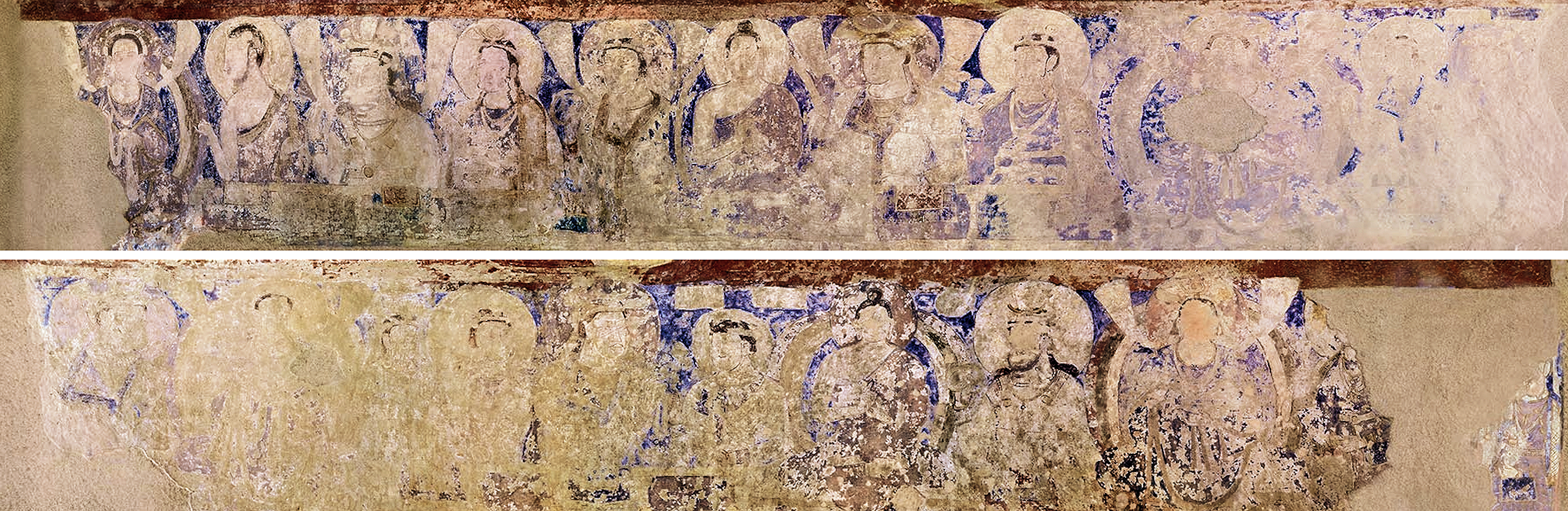
Lateral rows of attending Kings and dignitaries

Sun God in tunic and boots, on a charriot pulled by two horses. Vault of the 38 meter Buddha (now destroyed). This image of the Sun God is framed by two rows of King, dignitaries and Buddhas.

Most of the surfaces in the niche housing the Buddha must have been decorated with colourful murals, surrounding the Buddha with many paintings, but only fragments were remaining in modern times. For the 38 meter Eastern Buddha, built between 544 and 595 CE, the main remaining murals were the ones on the ceiling, right above the head of the Buddha. Recent dating based on stylistic and historical analysis confirms dates for these murals which follow the carbon-rated dates for the construction of the Buddhas themselves: the murals of the Eastern Buddha have been dated to the 6th to 8th century CE by Klimburg-Salter (1989), and post 635/645 CE by Tanabe (2004). As late as 2002, Marylin Martin Rhie argued a 3rd–4th century date for the Eastern Buddha, based on artistic criteria.

==== Sun God ====
Among the most famous paintings of the Buddhas of Bamiyan, the ceiling of the smaller Eastern Buddha represents a solar deity on a chariot pulled by horses, as well as ceremonial scenes with royal figures and devotees. The god is wearing a caftan in the style of Tokhara, boots, and is holding a lance. His representation is derived from the iconography of the Iranian god Mithra, as revered in Sogdia. He is riding a two-wheeled golden chariot, pulled by four horses. Two winged attendants are standing to the side of the chariot, wearing a Corinthian helmet with a feather, and holding a shield. In the top portion are wind gods, flying with a scarf held in both hands. This composition is unique, and distinct from Gandhara or India, but there are some similarities with the paintings of Kizil and Dunhuang.

The central image of the Sun God on his golden chariot is framed by two lateral rows of individuals: kings and dignitaries mingling with Buddhas and Bodhisattvas. One of the personages, standing behind a monk in profile, is likely the King of Bamyan. He wears a crenulated crown with single crescent and korymbos, a round-neck tunic and a Sasanian headband.

==== Hephthalite donors ====
The Bamiyan Buddhas were built at the time of the Hephthalites. Several of the figures have the characteristic appearance of the Hephthalites of Tokharistan, with belted jackets with a unique lapel of their tunic being folded on the right side, the cropped hair, the hair accessories, their distinctive physiognomy and their round beardless faces. These figures must represent the donors and potentates who supported the building of the monumental giant Buddha. The individuals in this painting are very similar to the individuals depicted in Balalyk Tepe, and they may be related to the Hepthalites. They participate "to the artistic tradition of the Hephthalite ruling classes of Tukharestan". These murals disappeared with the destructions of 2001.

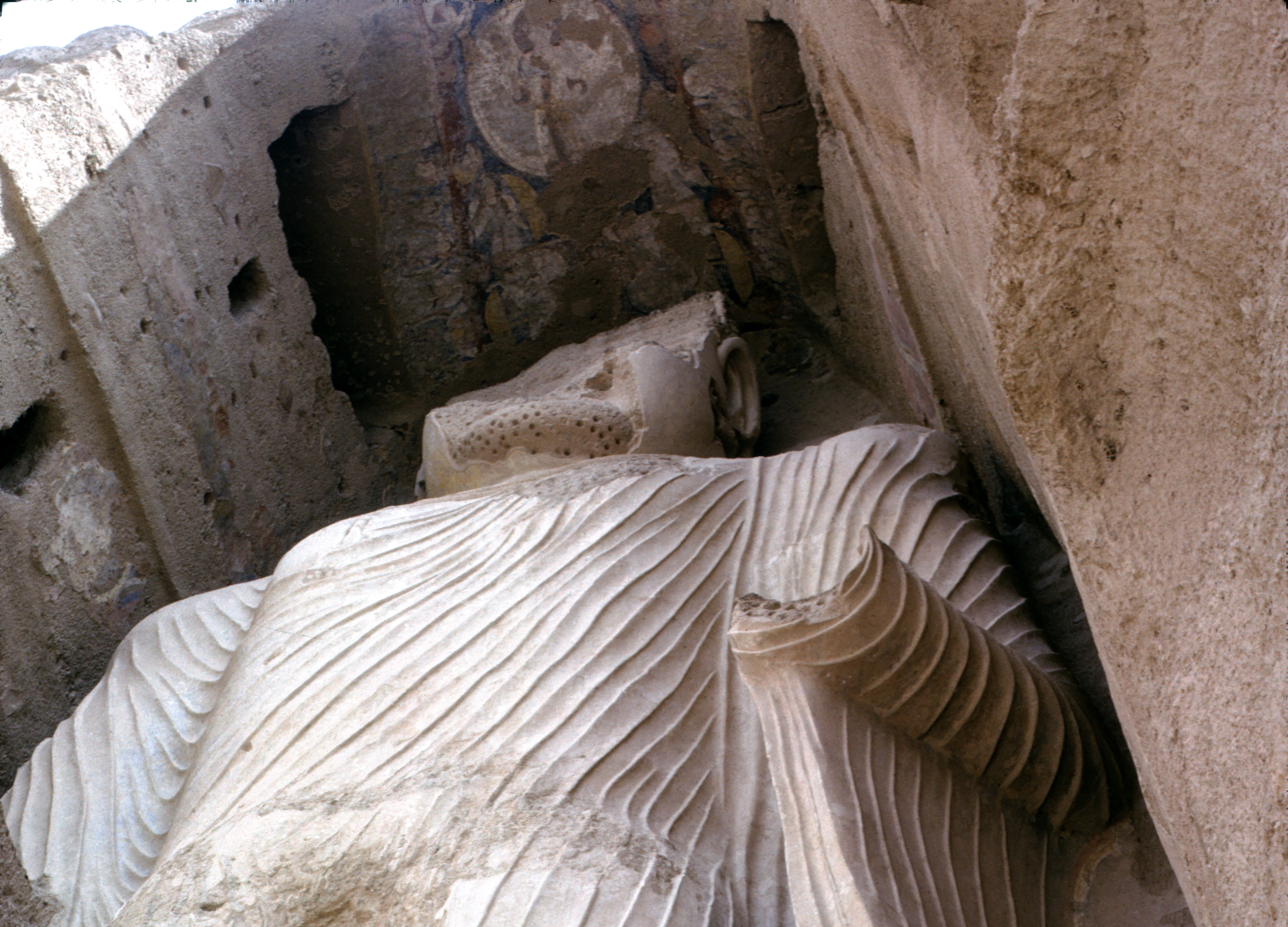
Mural of the Sun God riding his golden chariot and rows of royal donors along the sides, over the head of the smaller 38 meter Eastern Buddha (carbon-dated to 544–595 CE).

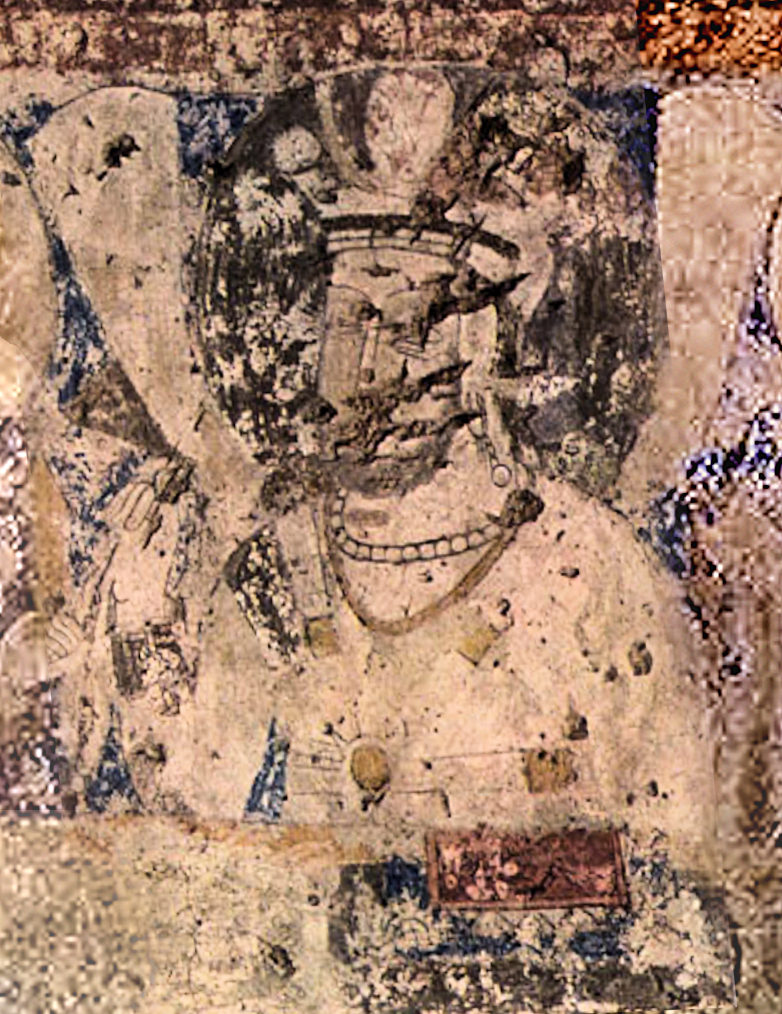
Probable King of Bamiyan, in Sasanian style, in the niche of the 38 meters Buddha, next to the Sun God, Bamiyan.

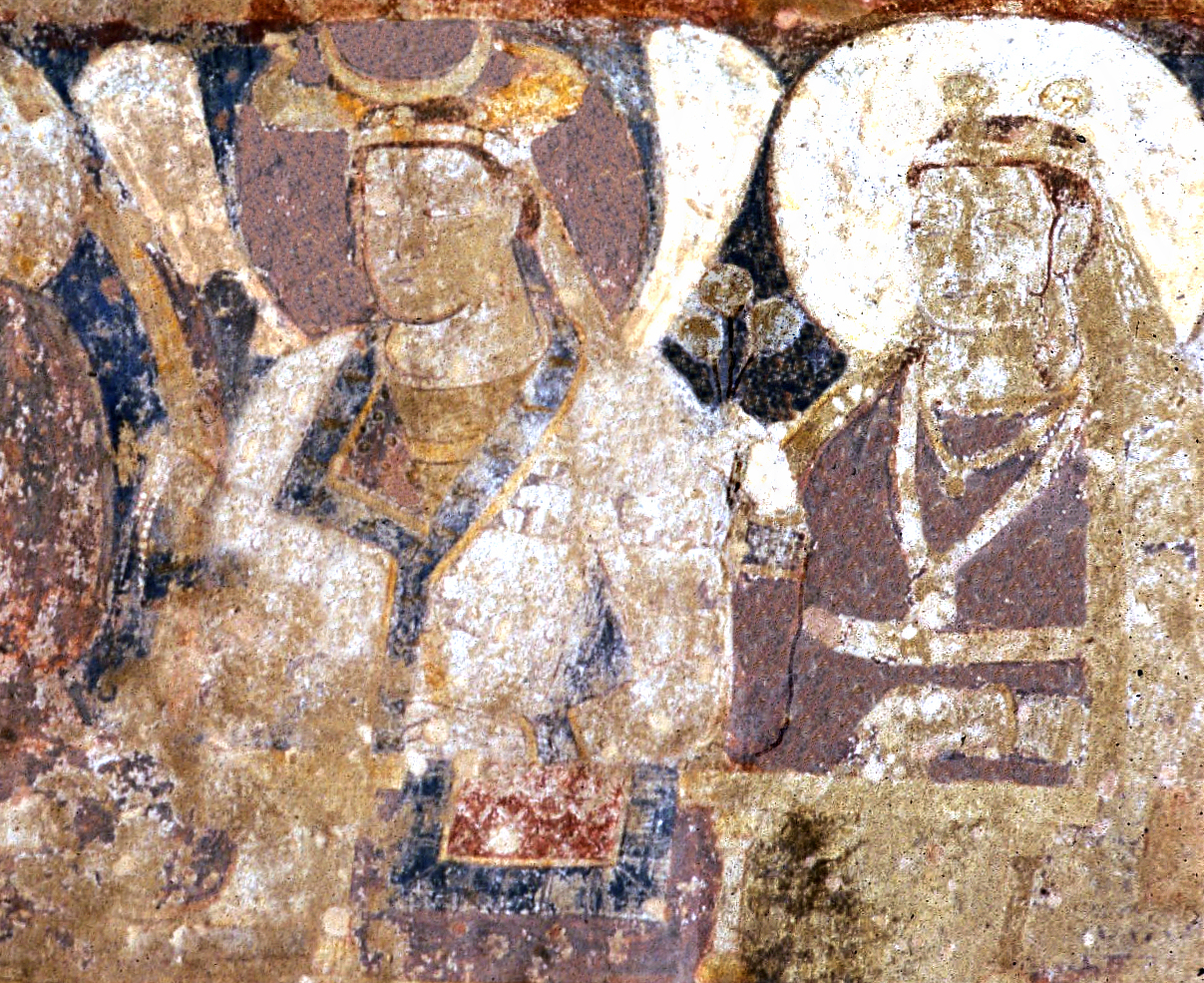
Probable Hepthalite rulers of Tokharistan, with single-lapel caftan and single-crescent crown, in the lateral row of dignitaries next to the Sun God.

=== Western Buddha (built c. 591–644 CE) ===
A few murals also remained around the taller 55 meter Western Buddha on the ceiling and on the sides. Many are more conventionally Buddhist in character. Some of the later mural paintings show male devotees in double-lapel caftans.

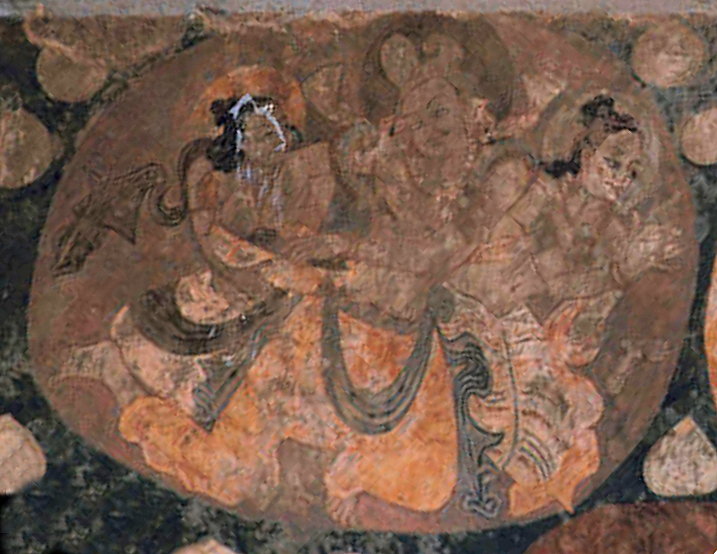
Paintings of celestial beings in the niche of the 55 meter large Buddha.

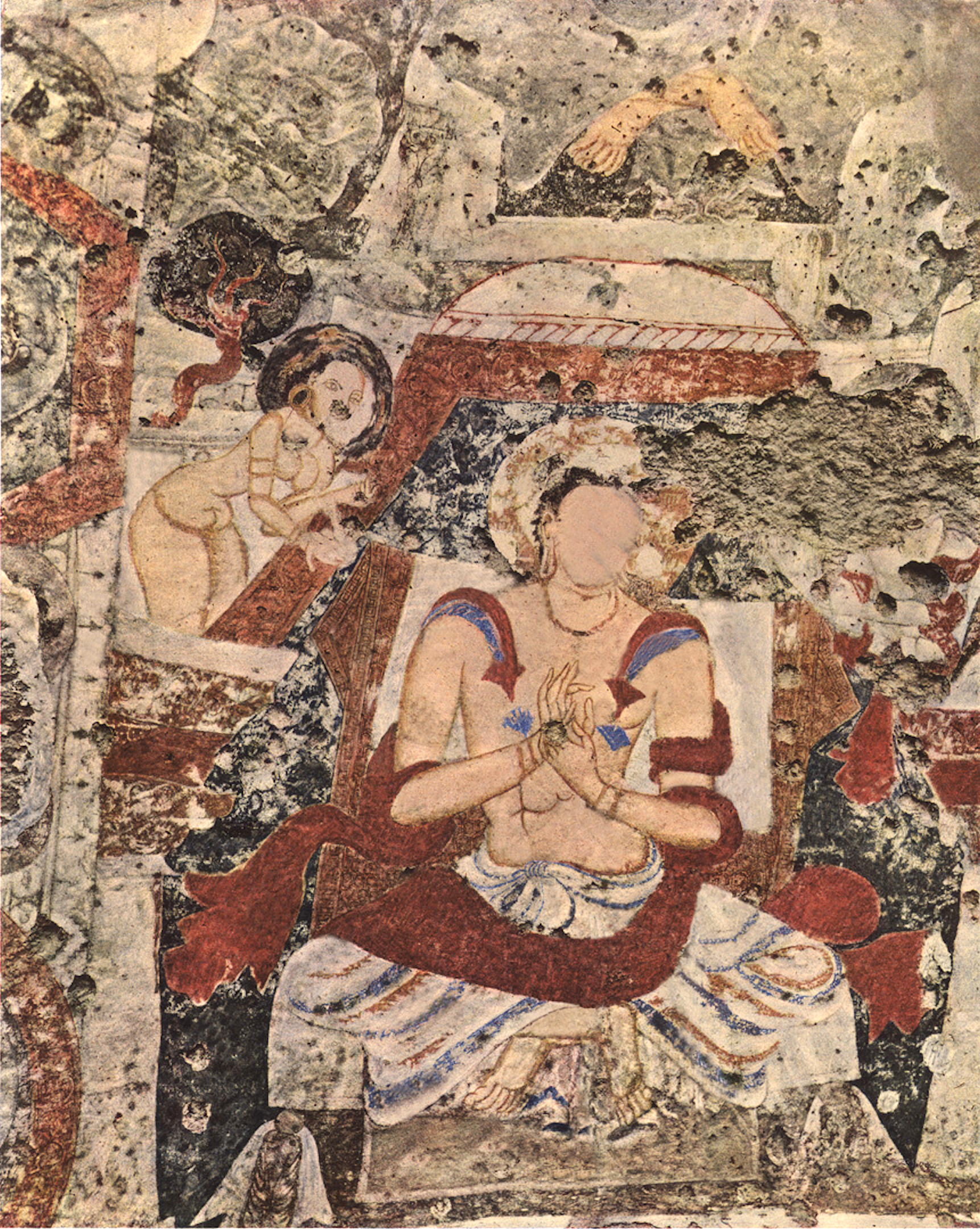
Western Buddha, Niche, ceiling, east section E1 and E2.

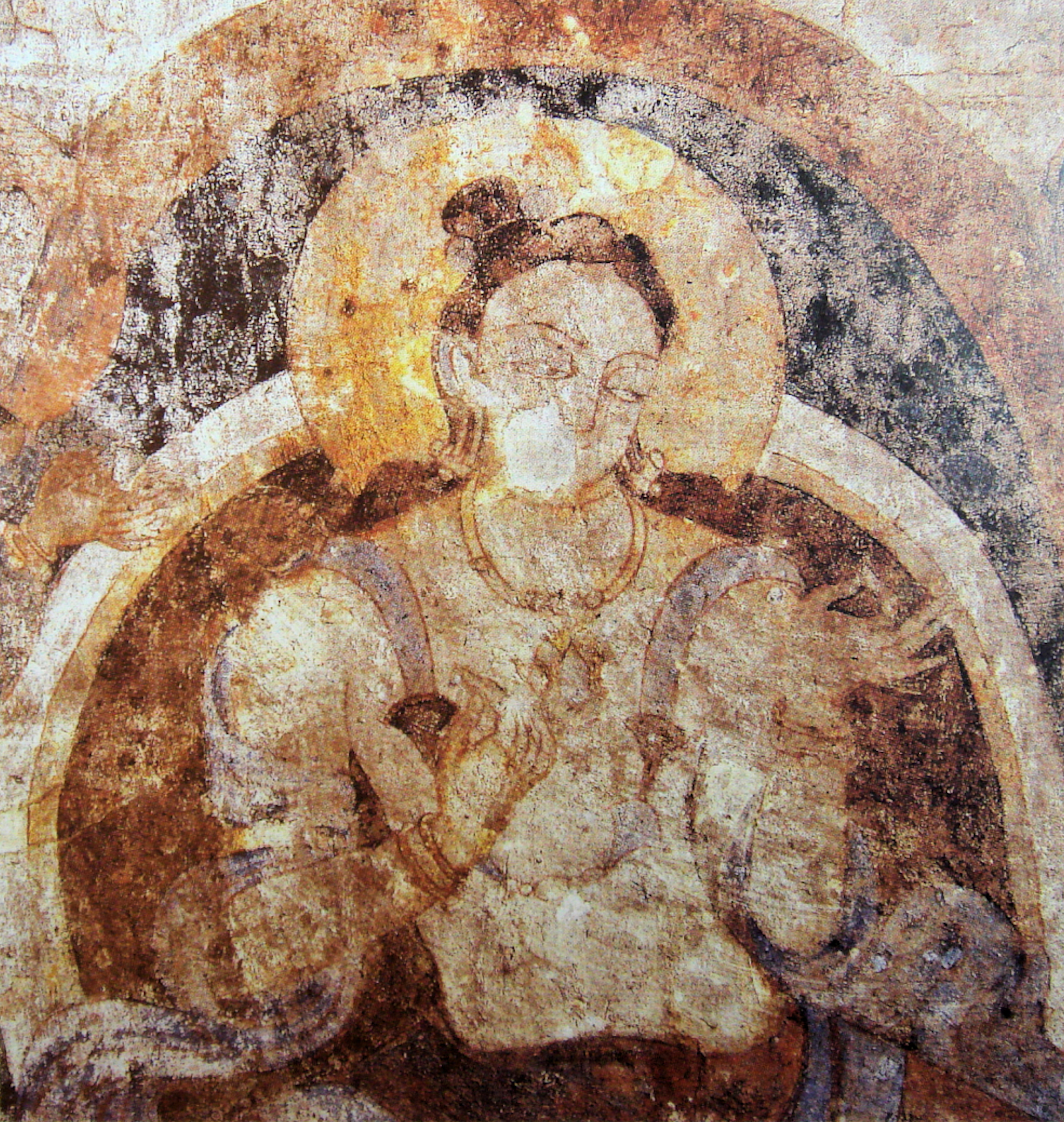
Bodhisattva, ceiling of the niche of the Great Western Buddha, early 7th century, Bamiyan

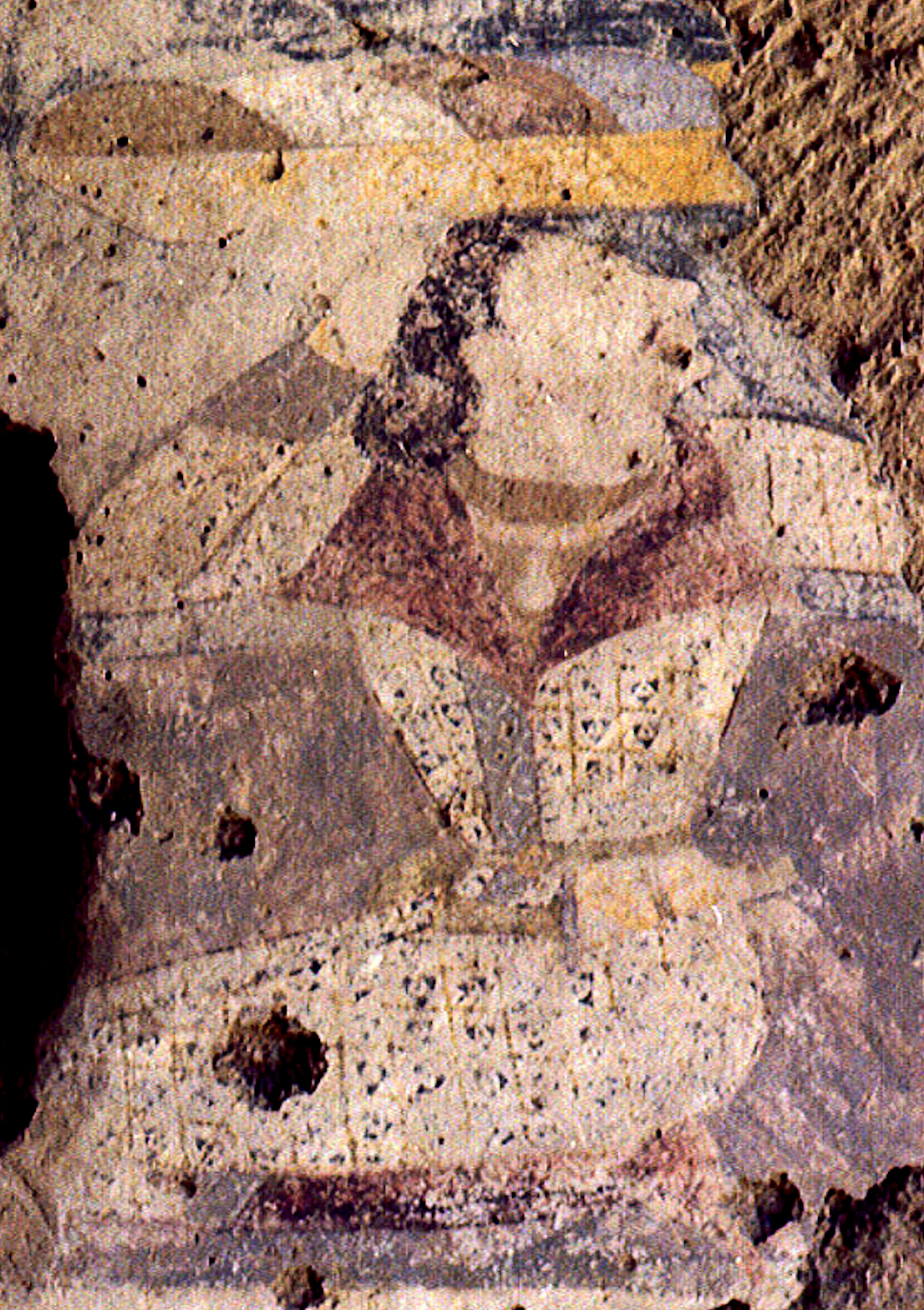
Devotee in double-lapel caftan, left wall of the niche of the Western Buddha. He has also been described as a Hephthalite.

=== Adjoining caves ===
Later mural paintings of Bamiyan, dated to the 7th–8th centuries CE, display a variety of male devotees in double-lapel caftans. The works of art show a sophistication and cosmopolitanism comparable to other works of art of the Silk Road, such as those of Kizil, are attributable to the sponsorship of the Western Turks (Yabghus of Tokharistan). The nearby Kakrak caves also have some works of art.

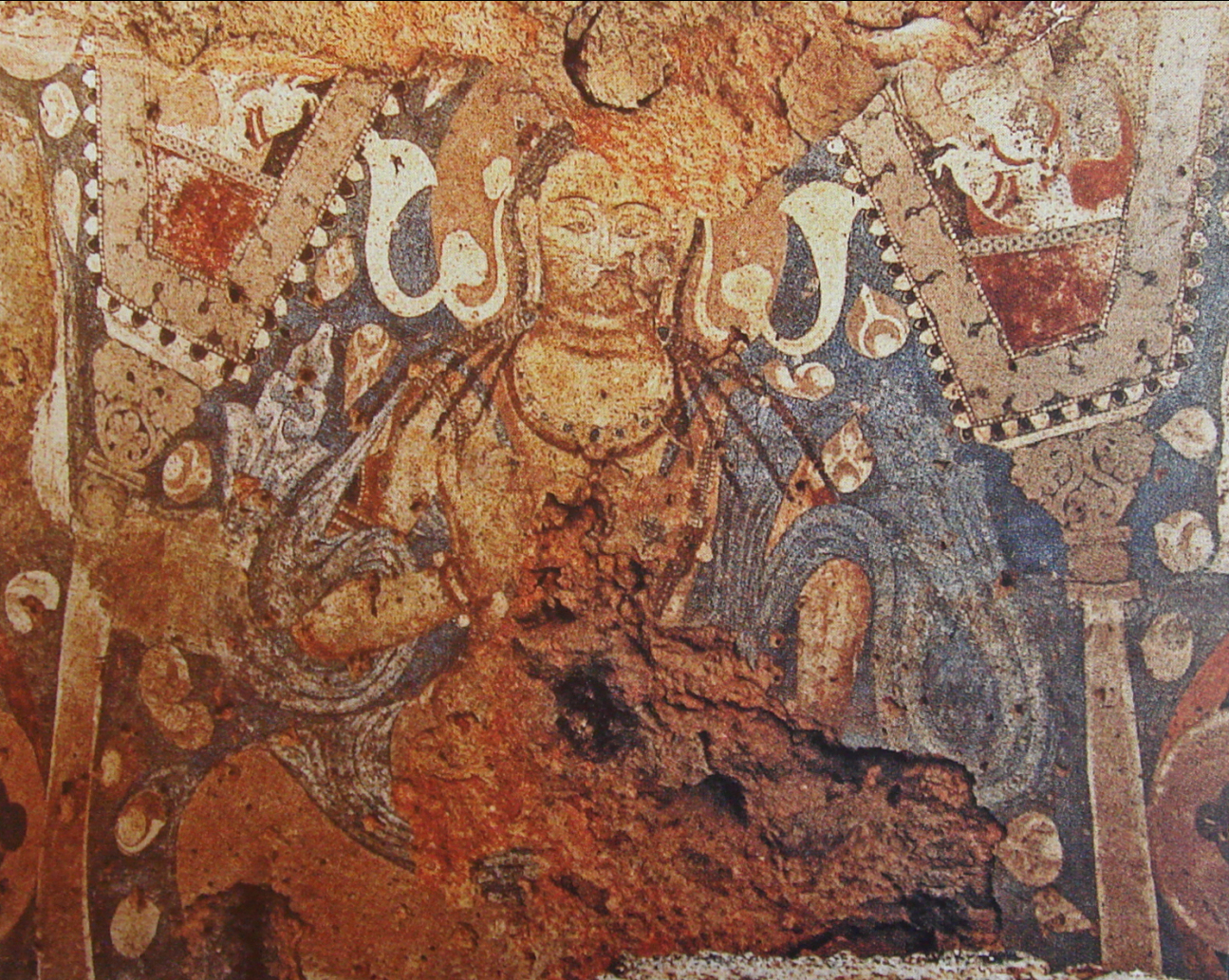
Bodhisattva Maitreya, ceiling of the cave E, late 7th early 8th century, Bamiyan

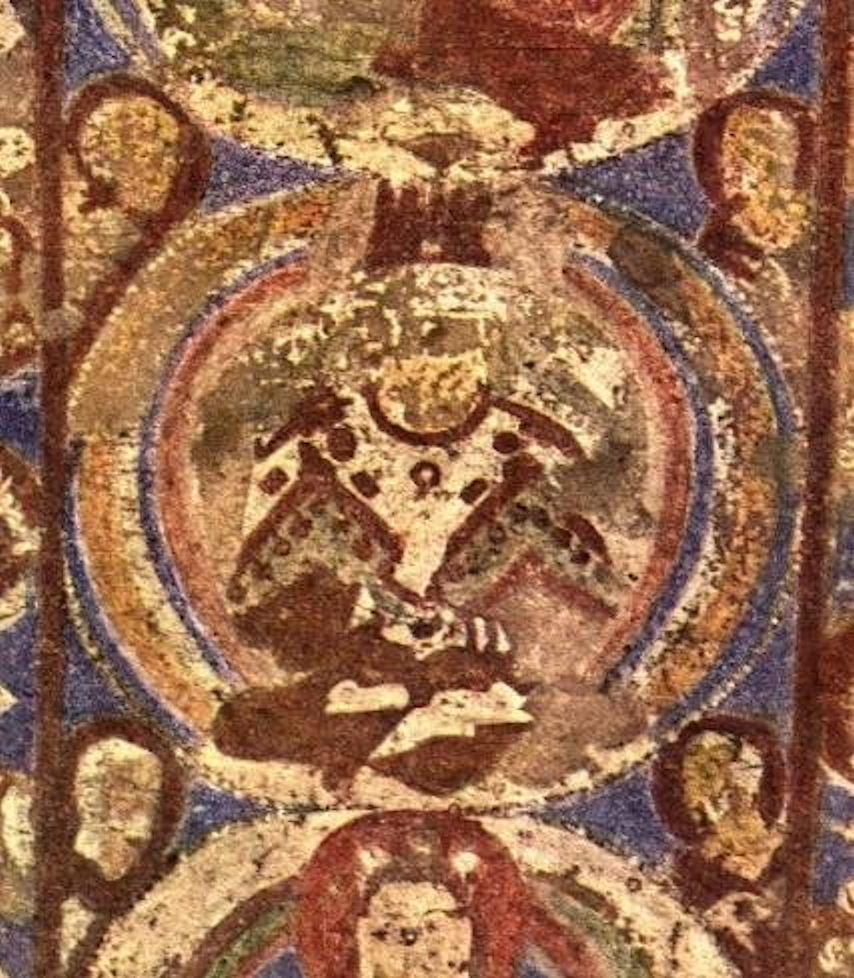
Buddha wearing a crown and a chamail cape. Painting in niche "I" at Bamiyan, 7th century CE

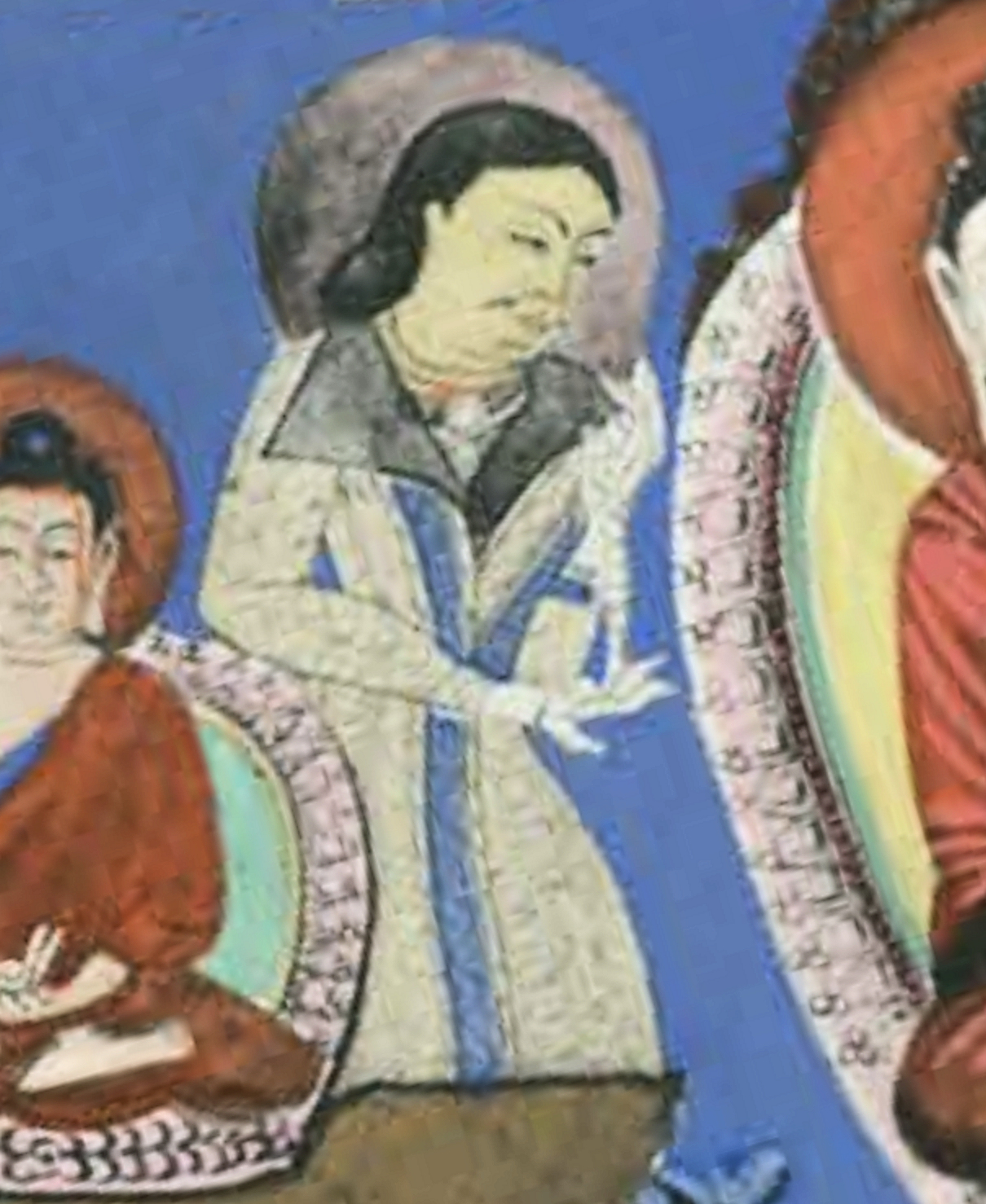
Devotee in double-lapel caftan, next to the Buddha. Cave G, Bamyan (detail)

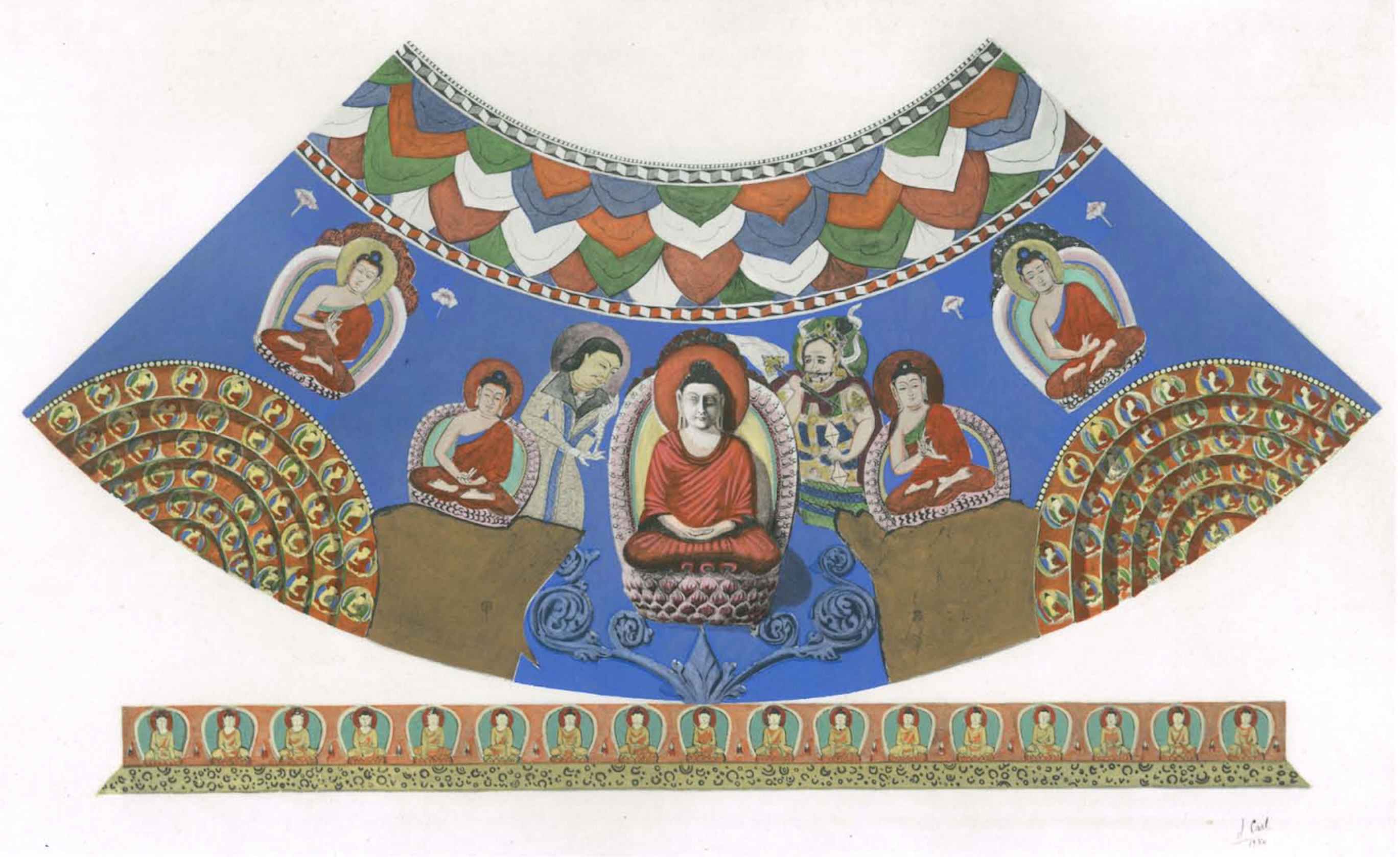
Reconstructed mural of Cave G, Bamyan

After the destruction of the Buddhas, 50 more caves were revealed. In 12 of the caves, wall paintings were discovered. In December 2004, an international team of researchers stated that the wall paintings at Bamyan were painted between the 5th and the 9th centuries, rather than the 6th to 8th centuries, citing their analysis of radioactive isotopes contained in straw fibers found beneath the paintings. It is believed that the paintings were done by artists travelling on the Silk Road.

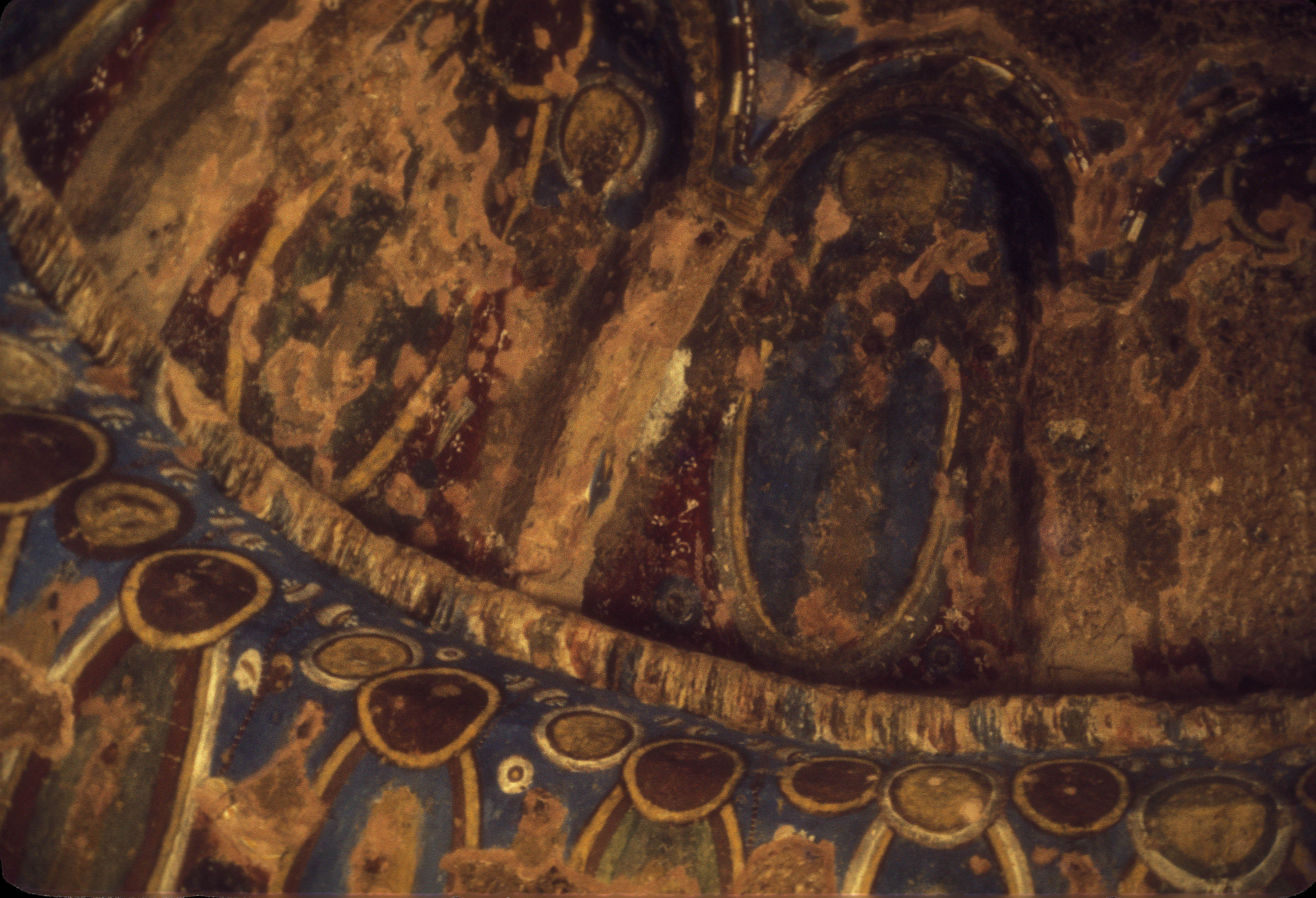
Grotto painting in 2008

Scientists from the Tokyo Research Institute for Cultural Properties in Japan, the Centre for Research and Restoration of Museums of France in France, the Getty Conservation Institute in the United States, and the European Synchrotron Radiation Facility (ESRF) in Grenoble, France, analysed samples from the paintings, typically less than 1 mm across. They discovered that the paint contained pigments such as vermilion (red mercury sulfide) and lead white (lead carbonate). These were mixed with a range of binders, including natural resins, gums (possibly animal skin glue or egg), and oils, probably derived from walnuts or poppies. Specifically, researchers identified drying oils from murals showing Buddhas in vermilion robes sitting cross-legged amid palm leaves and mythical creatures as being painted in the middle of the 7th century. It is believed that they are the oldest known surviving examples of oil painting, possibly predating oil painting in Europe by as much as six centuries. The discovery may lead to a reassessment of works in ancient ruins in Iran, China, Pakistan, Turkey, and India.

Initial suspicion that the oils might be attributable to contamination from fingers, as the touching of the painting is encouraged in Buddhist tradition, was dispelled by spectroscopy and chromatography giving an unambiguous signal for the intentional use of drying oils rather than contaminants. Oils were discovered underneath layers of paint, unlike surface contaminants. Scientists also found the translation of the beginning section of the original Sanskrit Pratītyasamutpāda Sutra translated by Xuanzang that spelled out the basic belief of Buddhism and said all things are transient.

== Attacks on the statues ==
=== Taliban incursions (1998–2001) ===
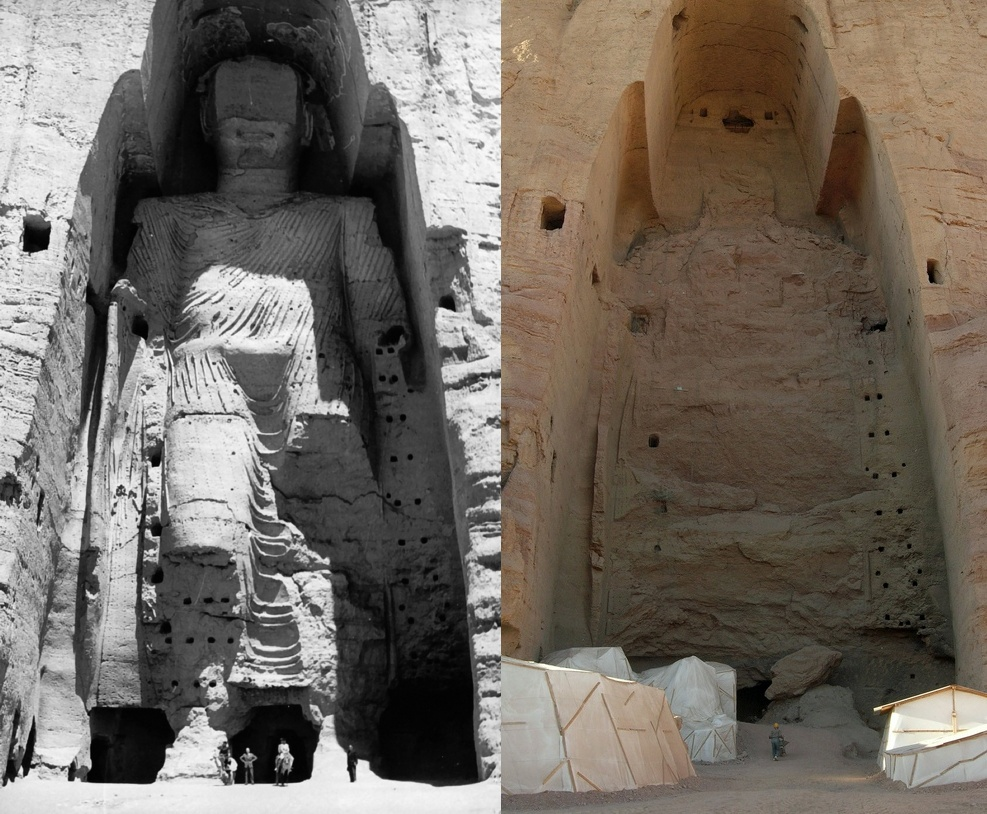
Taller, 55 meter Buddha in 1963 and in 2008 after destruction

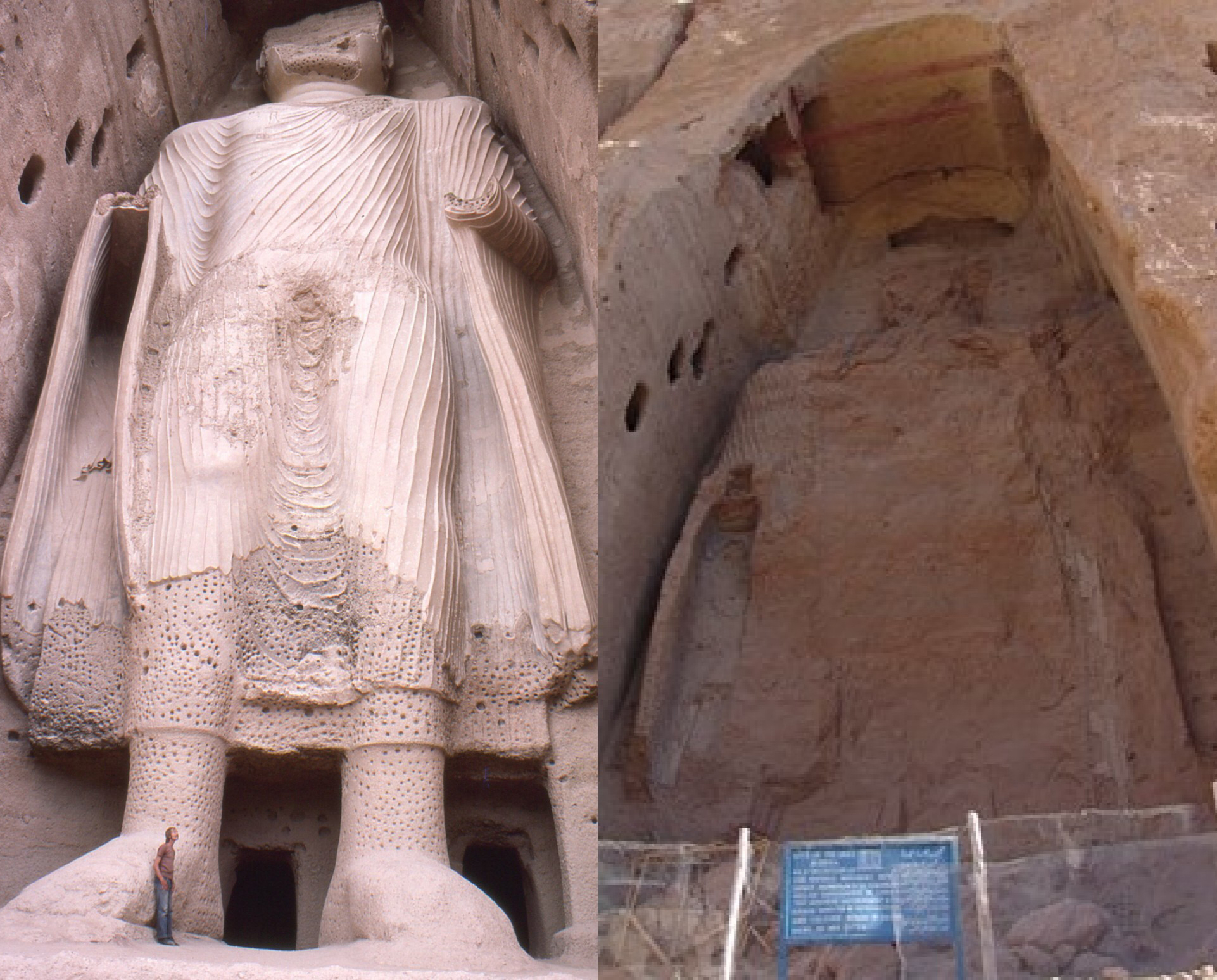
Smaller, 38 meter Buddha, before and after destruction. The paintings of Hepthalite royal sponsors on the ceiling have also disappeared.

During the Afghan Civil War, the area around the Buddhas was initially under the control of the Hezbe Wahdat—part of the Northern Alliance—who were against the Taliban. However, Mazar-i-Sharif fell in August 1998, and the Bamyan valley was entirely surrounded by Taliban forces. The town was captured on 13 September 1998 after a successful blockade.

Abdul Wahed, a local Taliban commander who had long before announced his intentions to obliterate the Buddhas, drilled holes in the Buddhas' heads into which he planned to load explosives. He was prevented from proceeding by Mullah Omar, the de facto leader of the Taliban: According to United Nations representative Michael Semple:

Mullah Omar appointed Maulawi Muhammad Islam of Ru-ye Doab as Bamian governor. As a Tatar from neighbouring Samangan Province, the Maulawi had connections with all the commanders of Bamian from the jihad era. Whatever his other sins, Bamian was also a part of Maulawi Islam's heritage. His deputies described to me how, when they saw what Abdul Wahed was doing, they contacted Mullah Omar in Kandahar and he gave the order to stop further drilling.

Other people blew off the head of the smaller Buddha using dynamite, aimed rockets at the larger Buddha's groin, and burnt tires at the latter's head. In July 1999, Omar decreed in favour of preserving the statues, and described plans to establish a tourism circuit. In early 2000, local Taliban authorities asked for the UN's assistance to rebuild drainage ditches around the tops of the alcoves where the Buddhas were set.

=== Destruction by the Islamic Emirate ===
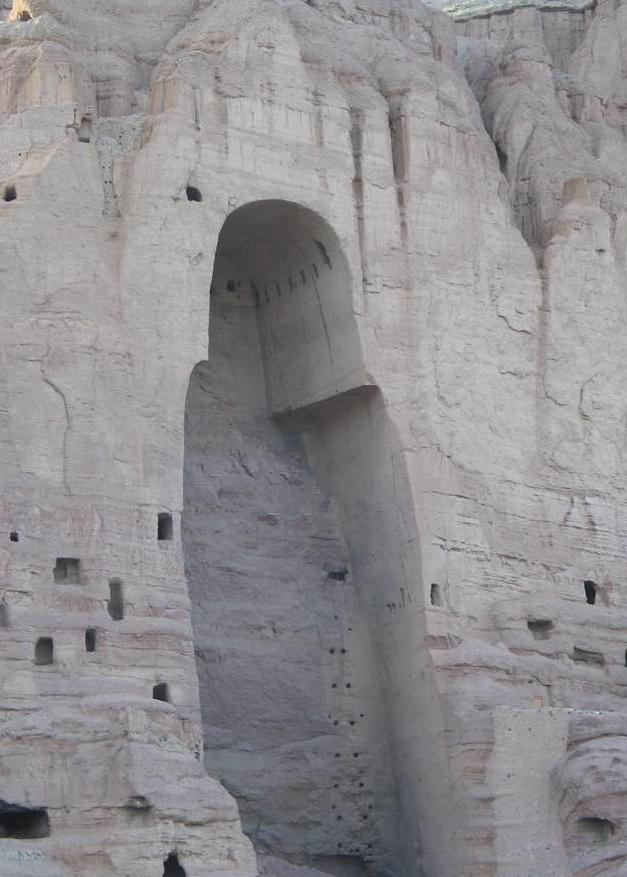
Site of the larger statue after it was destroyed

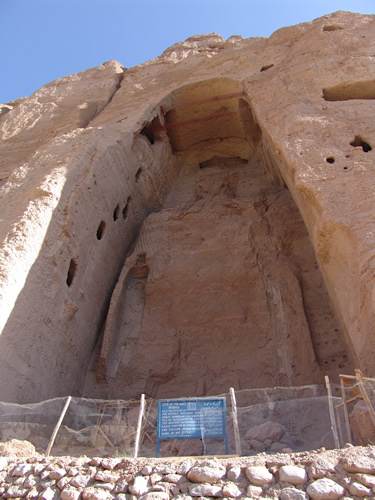
Site of the smaller statue in 2005

==== Decision to destroy ====
On 1 March 2001, the Taliban announced that all statues depicting humans in Afghanistan would be destroyed. Work to destroy the Buddhas began the next day, on 2 March, and continued for several weeks.

On 6 March 2001, British newspaper The Times quoted Omar as stating "Muslims should be proud of smashing idols. It has given praise to Allah that we have destroyed them."

During a 13 March interview for Japan's Mainichi Shimbun, Afghan Foreign Minister Wakil Ahmad Mutawakel stated that the destruction was anything but a retaliation against the international community for economic sanctions: "We are destroying the statues in accordance with Islamic law and it is purely a religious issue." A statement issued by the ministry of religious affairs of the Taliban regime justified the destruction as being in accordance with Islamic law.

Later, on 18 March 2001, then Taliban ambassador-at-large Sayed Rahmatullah Hashemi said that the destruction of the statues was carried out by the Head Council of Scholars after a Swedish monuments expert proposed to restore the statues' heads. Rahmatullah Hashemi is reported as saying: "When the Afghan head council asked them to provide the money to feed the children instead of fixing the statues, they refused and said, 'No, the money is just for the statues, not for the children'. Herein, they made the decision to destroy the statues"; however, he did not comment on the claim that a foreign museum offered to "buy the Buddhist statues, the money from which could have been used to feed children". Rahmatullah Hashemi added: "If we had wanted to destroy those statues, we could have done it three years ago," referring to the start of U.S. sanctions. "In our religion, if anything is harmless, we just leave it. If money is going to statues while children are dying of malnutrition next door, then that makes it harmful, and we destroy it." Hashemi denied any religious grounds in the justification of the statues' destruction.

In 2004, following the American invasion of Afghanistan and his exile, Omar explained in an interview:

I did not want to destroy the Bamiyan Buddha. In fact, some foreigners came to me and said they would like to conduct the repair work of the Bamiyan Buddha that had been slightly damaged due to rains. This shocked me. I thought, these callous people have no regard for thousands of living human beings—the Afghans who are dying of hunger, but they are so concerned about non-living objects like the Buddha. This was extremely deplorable. That is why I ordered its destruction. Had they come for humanitarian work, I would have never ordered the Buddha's destruction.

There is additional speculation that the destruction may have been influenced by al-Qaeda in order to further isolate the Taliban from the international community, thus tightening relations between the two; however, the evidence is circumstantial. Abdul Salam Zaeef held that the destruction of the Buddhas was finally ordered by Abdul Wali, the Minister for the Propagation of Virtue and the Prevention of Vice.

Destruction of the site by the Taliban

==== International reaction ====
The Taliban's intention to destroy the statues caused a wave of international shock and protest. According to UNESCO Director-General Kōichirō Matsuura, a meeting of ambassadors from the 54 member states of the Organisation of the Islamic Conference (OIC) was conducted. All OIC states—including Pakistan, Saudi Arabia, and the United Arab Emirates, three countries that officially recognised the Taliban government—joined the protest to spare the monuments. Saudi Arabia and the UAE later condemned the destruction as "savage". Although India never recognised the Taliban regime in Afghanistan, New Delhi offered to arrange for the transfer of all the artifacts in question to India, "where they would be kept safely and preserved for all mankind". These overtures were rejected by the Taliban. Pakistani president Pervez Musharraf sent a delegation led by Pakistan's interior minister Moinuddin Haider to Kabul to meet with Omar and try to prevent the destruction, arguing that it was un-Islamic and unprecedented. As recounted by Steve Coll:

Haider quoted a verse from the Koran that said Muslims should not slander the gods of other religions. ... He cited many cases in history, especially in Egypt, where Muslims had protected the statues and art of other religions. The Buddhas in Afghanistan were older even than Islam. Thousands of Muslim soldiers had crossed Afghanistan to India over the centuries, but none of them had ever felt compelled to destroy the Buddhas. "When they have spared these statues for fifteen hundred years, all these Muslims who have passed by them, how are you a different Muslim from them?" Haider asked. "Maybe they did not have the technology to destroy them," Omar speculated.

According to Taliban minister, Abdul Salam Zaeef, UNESCO sent the Taliban government 36 letters objecting to the proposed destruction. He asserted that the Chinese, Japanese, and Sri Lankan delegates were the most strident advocates for preserving the Buddhas. The Japanese in particular proposed a variety of different solutions to the issue, including moving the statues to Japan, covering the statues from view, and the payment of money. The second edition of the Turkistan Islamic Party's magazine Islamic Turkistan contained an article on Buddhism, and described the destruction of the Buddhas of Bamyan despite attempts by the Japanese government of "infidels" to preserve the remains of the statues. The exiled Dalai Lama said he was "deeply concerned".

The destruction of the Bamiyan Buddhas despite protests from the international community has been described by Michael Falser, a heritage expert at the Center for Transcultural Studies in Germany, as an attack by the Taliban against the globalising concept of "cultural heritage". The UNESCO Director-General Kōichirō Matsuura called the destruction a "...crime against culture. It is abominable to witness the cold and calculated destruction of cultural properties which were the heritage of the Afghan people, and, indeed, of the whole of humanity." Ahmad Shah Massoud, leader of the anti-Taliban resistance force, also condemned the destruction.

In Rome, the former Afghan King, Mohammed Zahir Shah, denounced the declaration in a rare press statement, calling it "against the national and historic interests of the Afghan people". Zemaryalai Tarzi, who was Afghanistan's chief archeologist in the 1970s, called it an "unacceptable decision".

==== Process of destruction ====
The destruction was carried out in stages. Initially, the statues were fired at for several days using anti-aircraft guns and artillery. This caused severe damage, but did not obliterate them. During the destruction, Taliban Information Minister Qudratullah Jamal said that, "The destruction work is not as easy as people would think. You can't knock down the statues by dynamite or shelling as both of them have been carved in a cliff. They are firmly attached to the mountain." Later, the Taliban placed anti-tank mines at the bottom of the niches, so that when fragments of rock broke off from artillery fire, the statues would receive additional destruction from particles that set off the mines. In the end, the Taliban lowered men down the cliff face and placed explosives into holes in the Buddhas. After one of the explosions failed to obliterate the face of one of the Buddhas, a rocket was launched that left a hole in the remains of the stone head.

A local civilian, speaking to Voice of America in 2002, said that he and some other locals were forced to help destroy the statues. He also claimed that Pakistani and Arab engineers were involved in the destruction. Mullah Omar, during the destruction, was quoted as saying, "What are you complaining about? We are only waging war on stones".

=== Current status (2002–present) ===
Though the figures of the two large Buddhas have been destroyed, their outlines and some features are still recognizable within the recesses. It is also still possible for visitors to explore the monks' caves and passages that connect them. As part of the international effort to rebuild Afghanistan after the Taliban war, the Japanese government and several other organizations—among them the Afghanistan Institute in Bubendorf, Switzerland, along with the ETH Zurich—have committed to rebuilding, perhaps by anastylosis, the two larger Buddhas. The local residents of Bamyan have also expressed their favour in restoring the structures. In April 2002, Afghanistan's post-Taliban leader Hamid Karzai called the destruction a "national tragedy" and pledged the Buddhas to be rebuilt. He later called the reconstruction a "cultural imperative".

In September 2005, Mawlawi Mohammed Islam Mohammadi, Taliban governor of Bamyan province at the time of the destruction and widely seen as responsible for its occurrence, was elected to the Afghan Parliament. He blamed the decision to destroy the Buddhas on Al-Qaeda's influence on the Taliban. In January 2007, he was assassinated in Kabul. Swiss filmmaker Christian Frei made a 95-minute documentary titled The Giant Buddhas on the statues, the international reactions to their destruction, and an overview of the controversy, released in March 2006. Testimony by local Afghans validates that Osama bin Laden ordered the destruction and that, initially, Mullah Omar and the Afghans in Bamyan opposed it.

Since 2002, international funding has supported recovery and stabilisation efforts at the site. Fragments of the statues are documented and stored with special attention given to securing the structure of the statue still in place. It is hoped that, in the future, partial anastylosis can be conducted with the remaining fragments. In 2009, ICOMOS constructed scaffolding within the niche to further conservation and stabilization. Nonetheless, several serious conservation and safety issues exist and the Buddhas are still listed as World Heritage in Danger.

In the summer of 2006, Afghan officials were deciding on the timetable for the re-construction of the statues. As they waited for the Afghan government and international community to decide when to rebuild them, a $1.3 million UNESCO-funded project was sorting out the chunks of clay and plaster—ranging from boulders weighing several tons to fragments the size of tennis balls—and sheltering them from the elements. The Buddhist remnants at Bamyan were included on the 2008 World Monuments Watch List of the 100 Most Endangered Sites by the World Monuments Fund. In 2013, the foot section of the smaller Buddha was rebuilt with iron rods, bricks and concrete by the German branch of ICOMOS. Further constructions were halted by order of UNESCO, on the grounds that the work was conducted without the organisation's knowledge or approval. The effort was contrary to UNESCO's policy of using original material for reconstructions, and it has been pointed out that it was done based on assumptions.

In 2015, a wealthy Chinese couple, Janson Hu and Liyan Yu, financed the creation of a 3D light projection of an artist's view of what the larger Buddha, known as Solsol to locals, might have looked like in its prime. The image was beamed into the niche one night in 2015; later the couple donated their $120,000 projector to the culture ministry. Shortly after the 2021 Taliban offensive that saw the overthrow of the Islamic Republic of Afghanistan and the return of Taliban to the government, tourists were again granted permission to visit the site. While the Taliban promised to preserve the Bamyan valley, preservation work was ceased indefinitely. UNESCO's Afghan operations were stymied, largely due to foreign investors' fears that continued support of cultural preservation projects in the country would run afoul of international sanctions. In February 2023, UNESCO's restoration work resumed when the Italian government approved new funding.

== Restoration ==
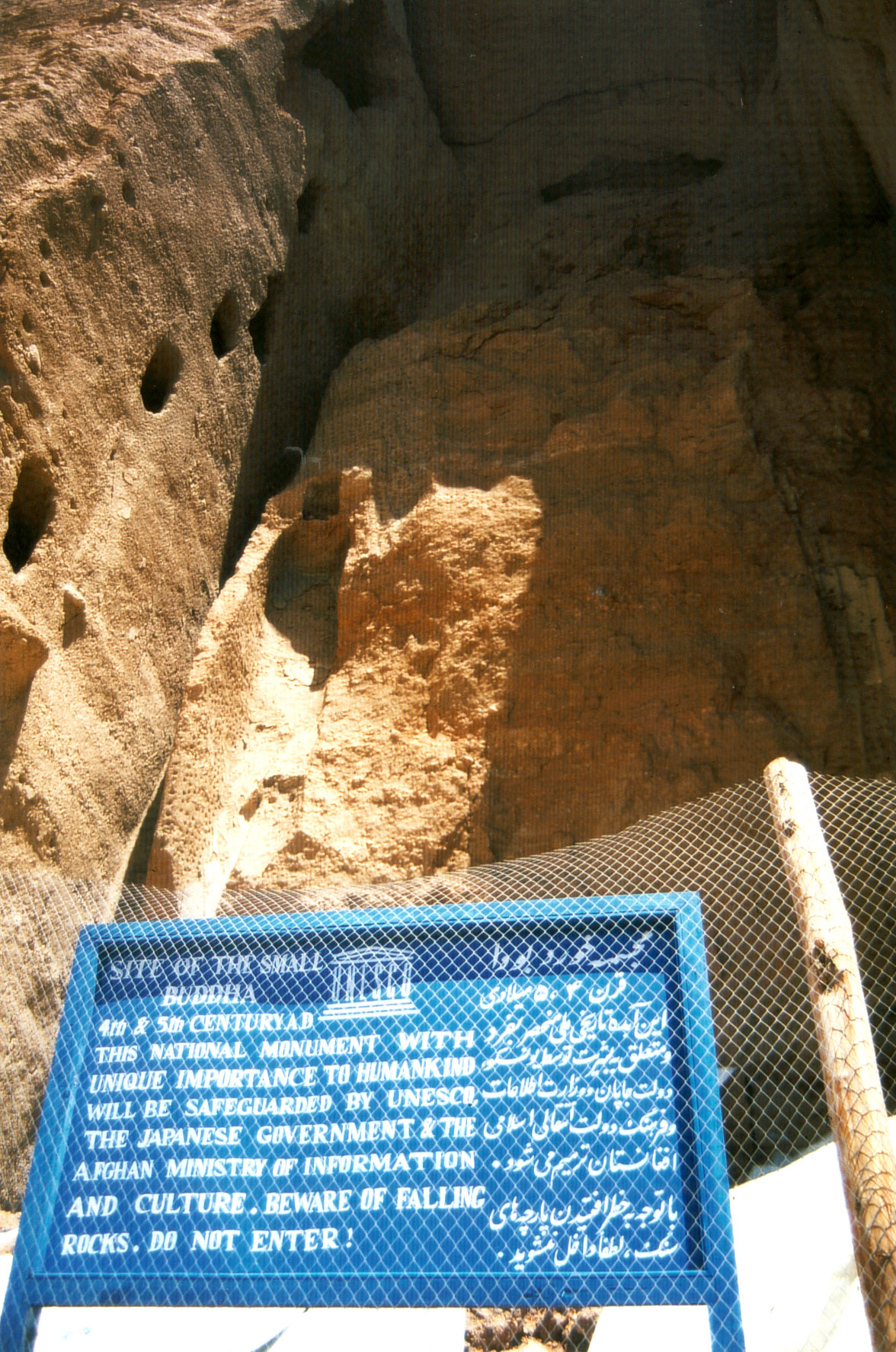
Caution Sign, 2017

The UNESCO Expert Working Group on Afghan cultural projects convened to discuss what to do about the two statues between 3 and 4 March 2011 in Paris. Researcher Erwin Emmerling of Technical University of Munich announced he believed it would be possible to restore the smaller statue using an organic silicon compound. The Paris conference issued a list of 39 recommendations for the safeguarding of the Bamyan site. These included leaving the larger Western niche empty as a monument to the destruction of the Buddhas, a feasibility study into the rebuilding of the Eastern Buddha, and the construction of a central museum and several smaller site museums. Work has since begun on restoring the Buddhas using the process of anastylosis, where original elements are combined with modern material. It is estimated that roughly half the pieces of the Buddhas can be put back together according to Bert Praxenthaler, a German art historian and sculptor involved in the restoration. The restoration of the caves and Buddhas has also involved training and employing local people as stone carvers. The project, which also aims to encourage tourism to the area, is being organised by UNESCO and the International Council on Monuments and Sites (ICOMOS).

The work has come under some criticism. It is felt by some, such as human rights activist Abdullah Hamadi, that the empty niches should be left as monuments to the fanaticism of the Taliban, while others believe the money could be better spent on housing and electricity for the region. Some people, including Habiba Sarabi, the provincial governor, believe that rebuilding the Buddhas would increase tourism, which would aid the surrounding communities.

=== Rise of the Buddhas with 3D light projection ===
After fourteen years, on 7 June 2015, a Chinese adventurist couple Zhang Xinyu and Liang Hong filled the empty cavities where the Buddhas once stood with 3D laser light projection technology. The projector used for the installation, worth approximately $120,000, was donated by Zhang and Liang, who were saddened by the destruction of the statues. With the desire of paying tribute, they requested permission from UNESCO and the Afghan government to do the project. About 150 local people came out to see the unveiling of the holographic statues.

=== Replicas ===
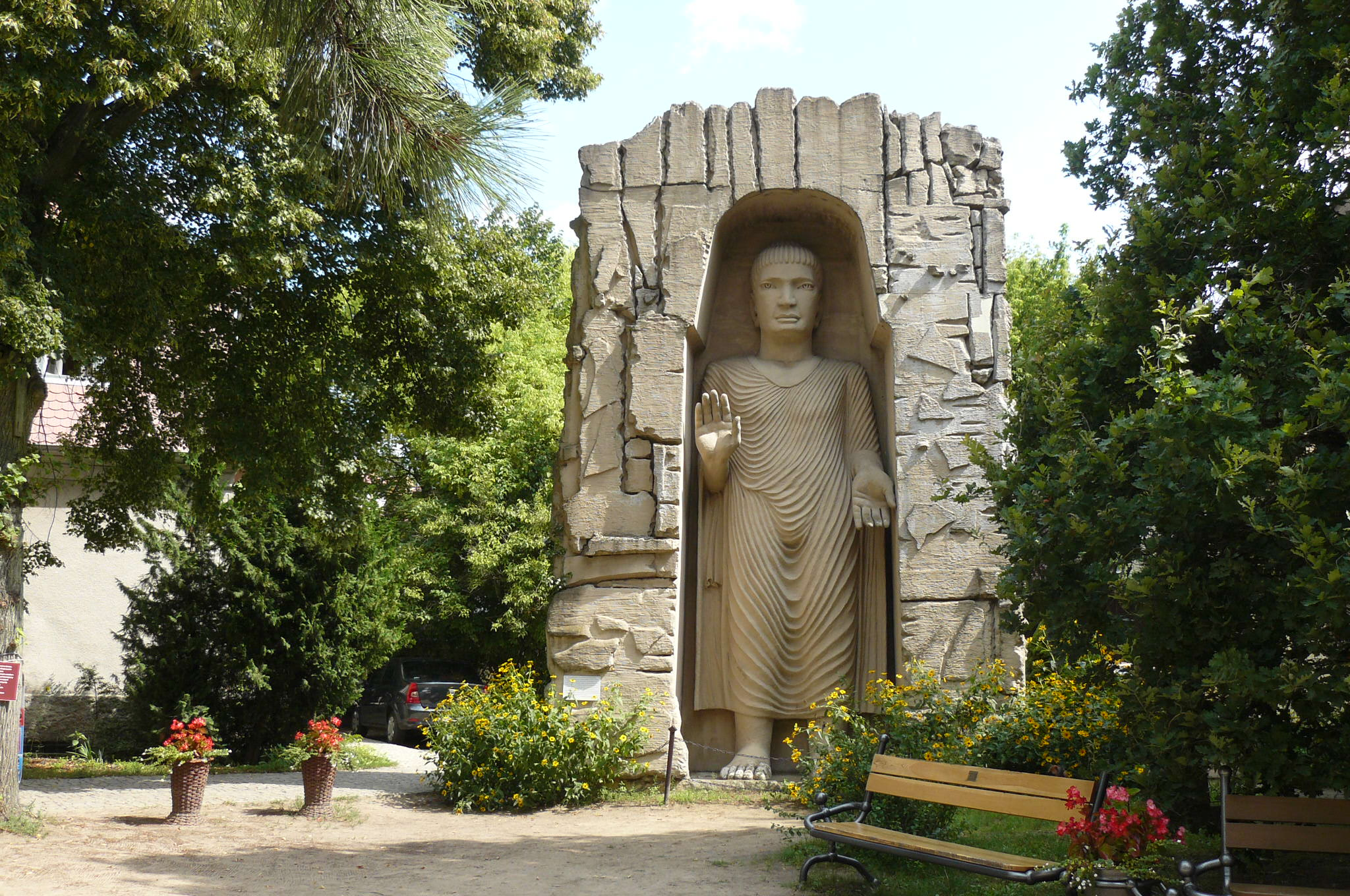
Arkady Fiedler Museum, Bamyan Replica

The destruction of the Buddhas of Bamyan inspired attempts to construct replicas of the Bamyan Buddhas. These include the following.

- In 2001 in China, carving of a 37-metre (121 ft) high Buddha was initiated in Sichuan, which is the same height as the smaller of the two Bamiyan Buddhas. It was funded by a Chinese businessman, Liang Simian. The project appears to have been given up for unknown reasons.
- In Sri Lanka, a full-scale replica has been created, which is now known as the Tsunami Honganji Viharaya at Pareliya. It is dedicated to the victims of the 2005 tsunami in the presence of Mahinda Rajapaksha. It was funded by Japan's Hongan-ji Temple of Kyoto and was inaugurated in 2006.
- In Poland, the Arkady Fiedler Museum of Tolerance has a replica of a Bamiyan Buddha.
- An 80-foot (24 m) stone Buddha was inaugurated at Sarnath in India in 2011. It stands within the Thai Buddhist Vihara.

== Gallery ==
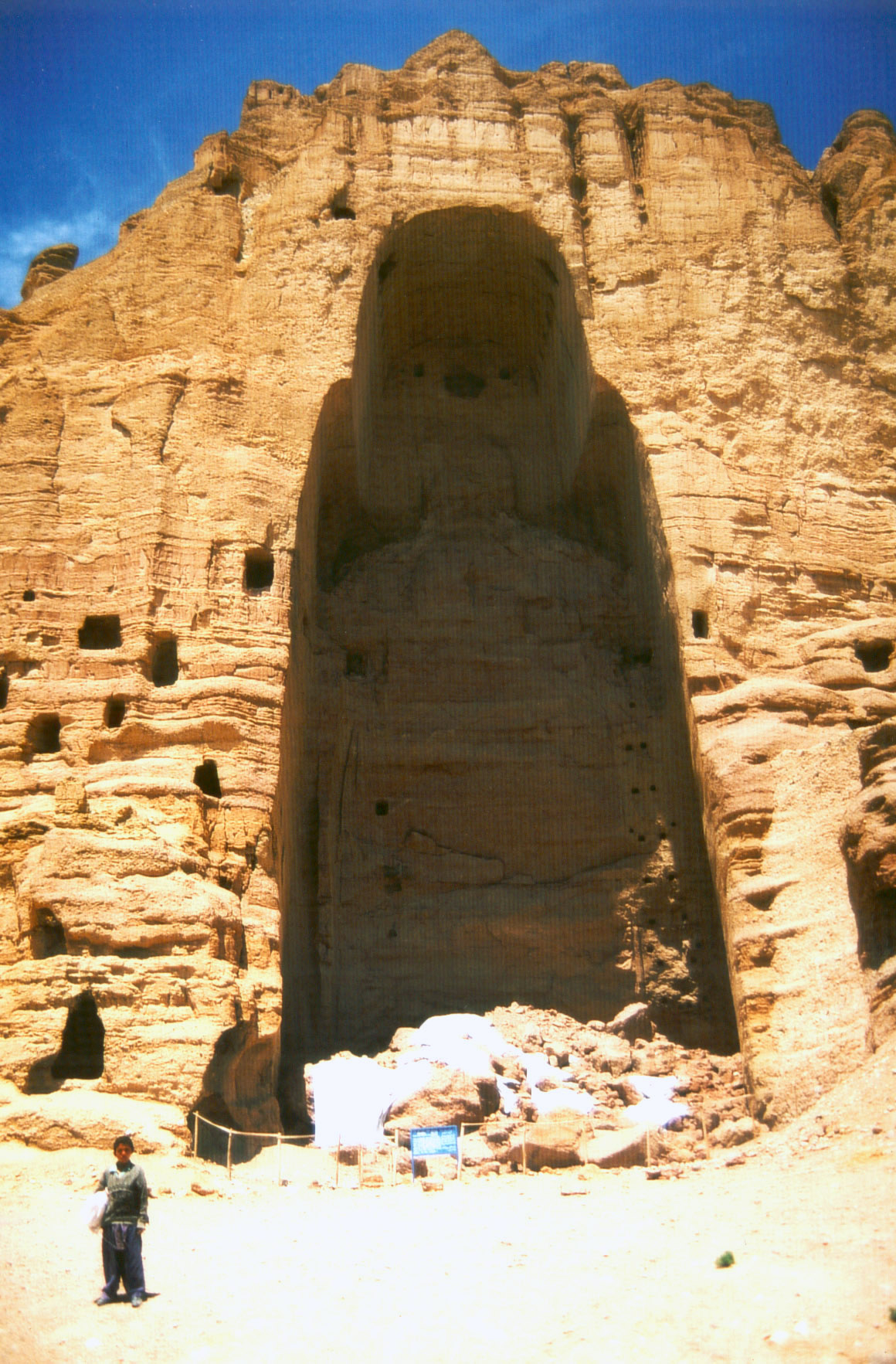
Taller Buddha, after destruction

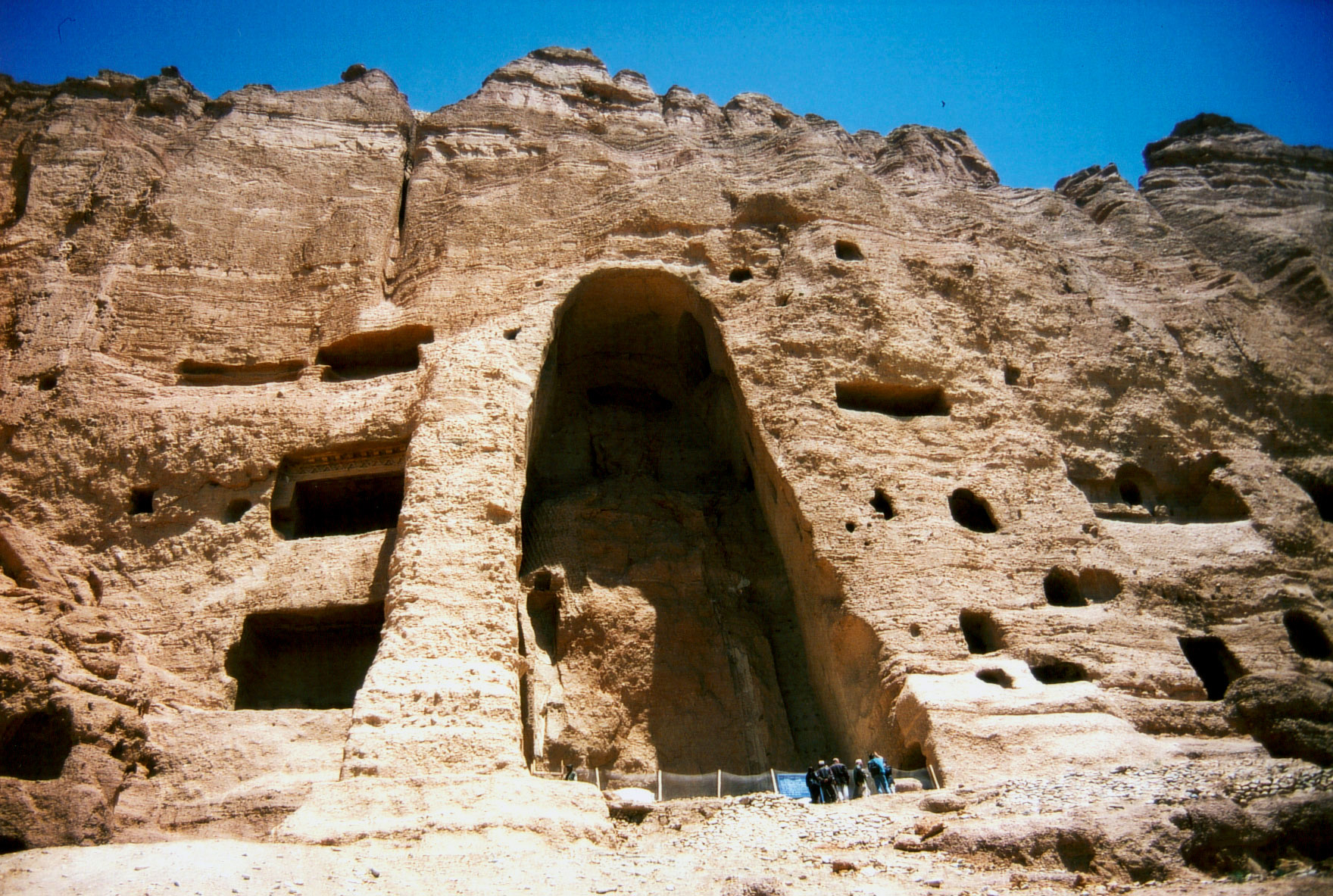
Smaller Buddha, after destruction

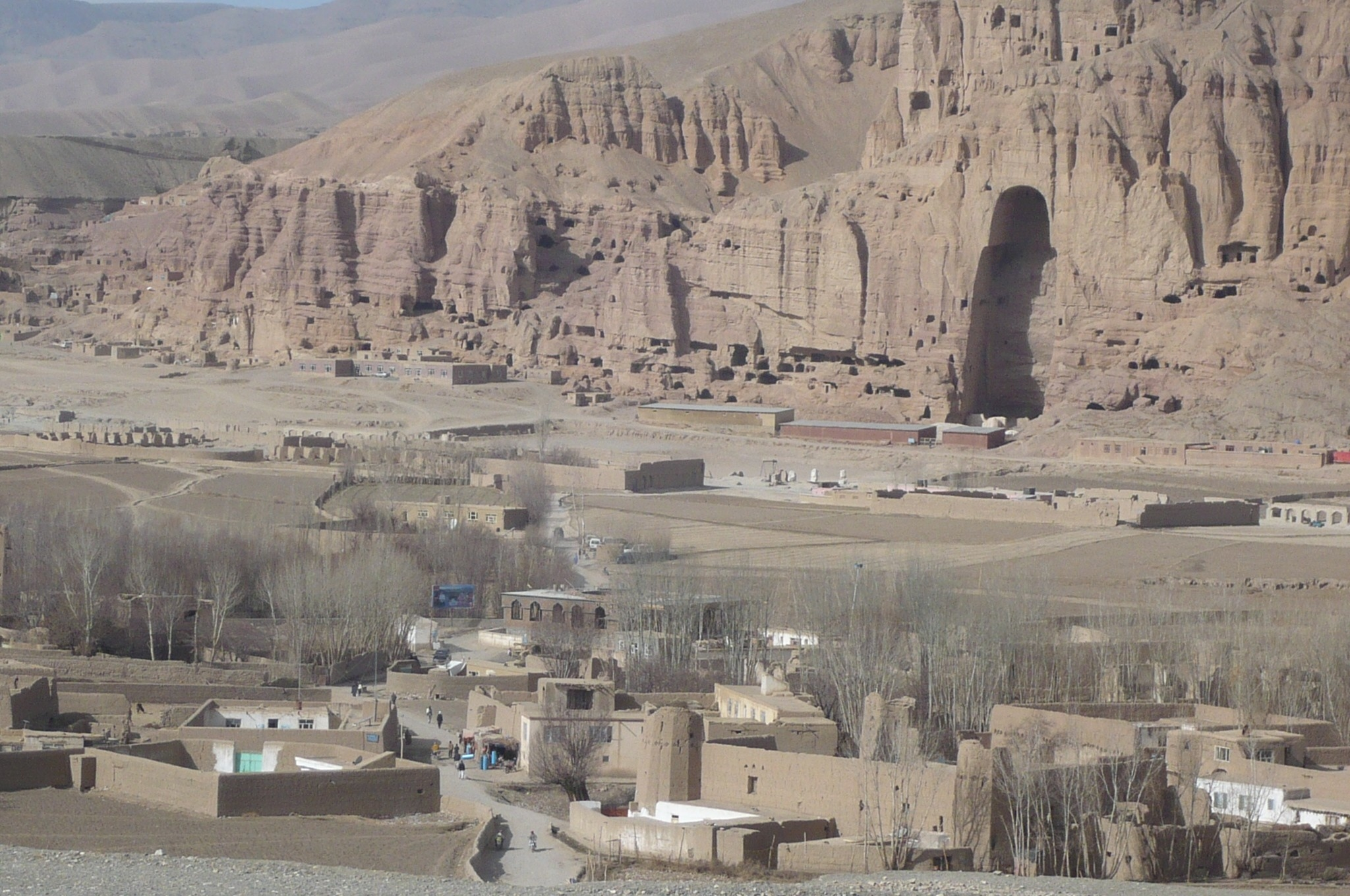
View of the rock where monasteries and Buddhas are carved

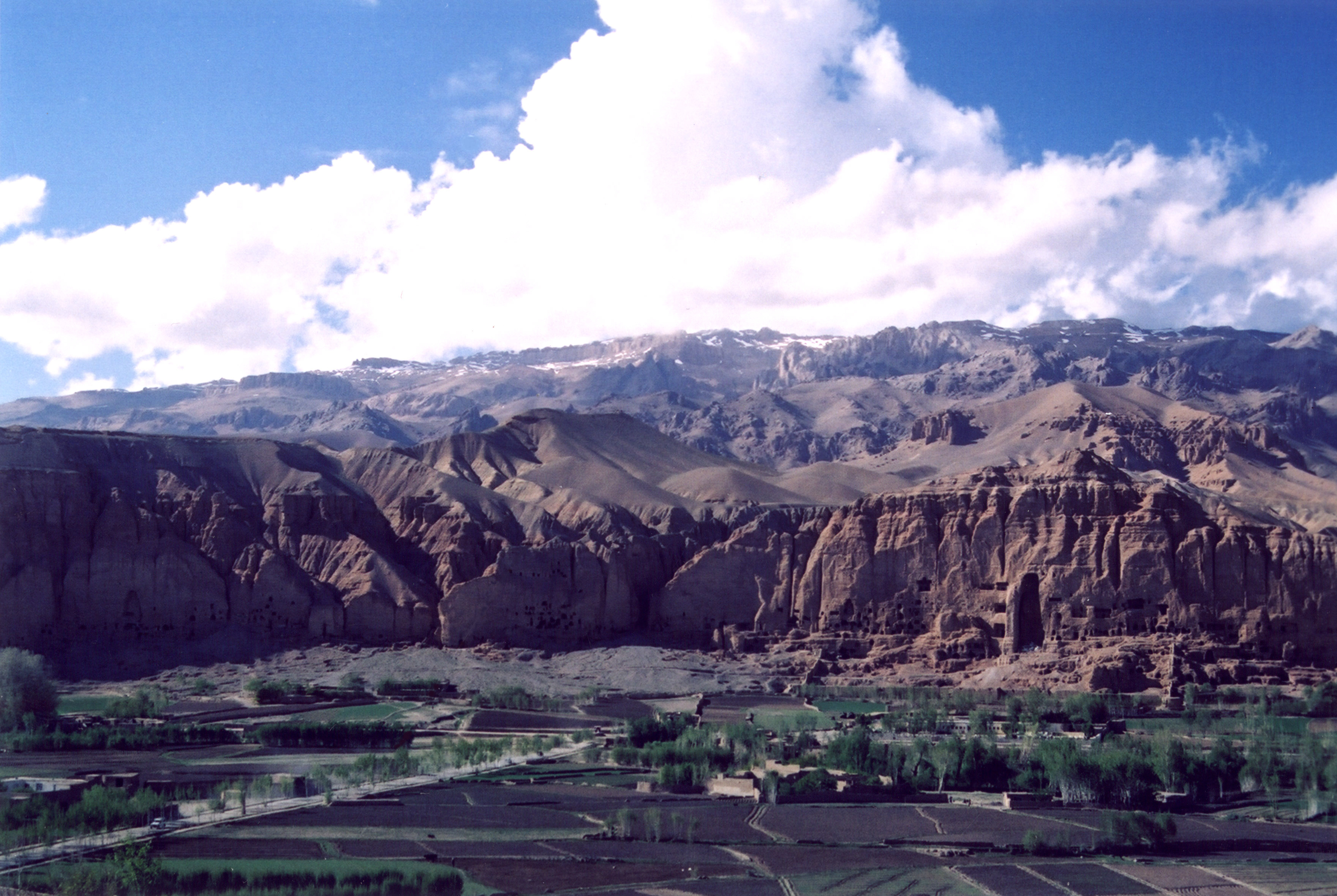
The landscape of the archaeological Remains of the Bamyan Valley

== In popular culture ==
Despite the Buddhas's destruction, the ruins continue to be a popular culture landmark, bolstered by increasing domestic and international tourism to the Bamyan Valley. The area around the ruins has since been used for the traditional game of buzkashi, and other events. The music video of pop singer Aryana Sayeed's hit 2015 song "Yaar-e Bamyani" was also shot by the ruins. The statues inspired Islamic writers in historical times. The larger statue appears as the malevolent giant Salsal in medieval Turkish tales.

In June 1971, Empress Michiko of Japan visited the Buddhas during an Imperial state visit to the Kingdom of Afghanistan with her husband. Upon her return to Japan, she composed a waka poem. A 2012 novel by Rajesh Talwar titled An Afghan Winter provides a fictional backdrop to the destruction of the Buddhas and its impact on the global Buddhist community. 2012 first person shooter Call of Duty: Black Ops II features the Buddhas of Bamiyan in the opening of the campaign mission Old Wounds, set in 1986 during the Soviet–Afghan War. They are also the mission's menu picture. The AD 507 chapter of 2020 novel A Traveller at the Gates of Wisdom by John Boyne writes an imaginary account of how the Buddhas were commissioned and built.

The 2022 Indian film Ram Setu shows the destruction of the Buddhas of Bamiyan and an archaeological team's subsequent attempts to salvage the remains where they discover a fictional treasure belonging to Raja Dahir and a colossal reclining Buddha (which has been described in the writings of Xuanzang but has not actually been discovered). The Light That Shines Through the Universe, a statue by Tuan Andrew Nguyen that pays homage to the Buddhas of Bamiyan is on display as the Plinth commission for the High Line in New York City from Spring 2026 to Fall 2027.

== See also ==
- Buddha Collapsed out of Shame
- Destruction of art in Afghanistan
- Buddhism in Afghanistan
- Buddhism in Central Asia
- Aniconism
- Aniconism in Islam
- Iconoclasm
- Destruction of cultural heritage by the Islamic State
- Greco-Buddhism
- Index of Buddhism-related articles
- Islamist destruction of Timbuktu heritage sites
- List of colossal sculptures in situ
- List of destroyed heritage
- List of tallest statues
- Ancient history of Afghanistan
- Silk Road transmission of Buddhism
- List of World Heritage in Danger
- The Light That Shines Through the Universe
