= Chronology of the expedition of Alexander the Great into Asia =

This is a chronological summary of the expedition of Alexander the Great into Asia against the Persian Empire of king Darius III, with indication of the countries/places visited or simply crossed, including the most important battles/sieges and the cities founded (Alexandrias). The events of the expedition are shown in chronological order. For each event is given, separated by:

1. date of event,
2. places/cities crossed, indicated by ancient name (present name, country),
3. regions, provinces or Persian satrapies of the places/cities crossed, with indication of their capital cities (where appropriate).

== Expedition ==
Date	Event	Source
April 334 B.C.	Departure of the expedition from Amphipolis (Greece)	
May 334	Troy (Turkey)―Troades, capital city	
May 334	Battle of the Granicus River (Biga Çay, near Dimetoka, Turkey)―Hellespontine Phrygia (capital city Dascylium (Ergili), captured by Parmenion)	
Jun 334	Sardes (near Salihli, Turkey)―Lydia, capital city	
Jun 334	Ephesus (Turkey)―Ionia	
Jul 334	Siege of Miletus (Turkey)―Ionia, capital city	
Sep 334	Siege of Halicarnassus (Bodrum, Turkey)―Caria, capital city	
?	Lycia (Turkey)―Lycia (capital city Xanthos)	
Dec 334	Phaselis (near Kemer, Turkey)―Pamphylia	
?	Termessos (Turkey)―Pamphylia	
Jan 333	Perge (modern Murtina, near Aksu, Turkey)―Pamphylia, capital city	
?	Aspendos (near Serik, Turkey)―Pamphylia	
?	Side (near Manavgat, Turkey)―Pamphylia	
?	Kelainai (near Dinar, Turkey)―Pisidia (capital city Sagalassos)	
Apr 333	Gordion (Yassihöyük, near Polatli, Turkey)―Great Phrygia, capital city	
?	Ankyra (Ankara, Turkey)―Cappadocia (capital city Comana (Kayseri))	
?	Cilician Gates (Turkey)―Cilicia	
Sep 333	Cydnos River (Tarsus Çayi River, Turkey )―Cilicia	
Sep 333	Tarsus (Turkey)―Cilicia, capital city	
Oct 333	Soli (Mezetlu, west of Mersin, Turkey)―Cilicia	
Nov 333	Battle of Issus, Pinarus River (Payas River, near Dörtyol, Turkey)―Cilicia	
Nov 333	Alexandretta or Alexandria near Issus (Iskenderun, Turkey)―Cilicia	
Dec 333	Aradus Island (Arwad, 3 km off the Syrian coastal town of Tartus, Syria)―Phoenicia(Syria)	
Jan 332	Byblos (40 km north of Beirut, Lebanon)―Phoenicia (Syria)	
Jan 332	Sidon (Lebanon)―Phoenicia (Syria)	
Jan-July 332	Siege of Tyre (Lebanon)―Phoenicia (Syria)	
?	Damascus (Syria)―Syria, capital city	
???	Jerusalem (Israel)―Syria	
Sep 332	Siege of Gaza (Palestine)―Syria	
Dec 332	Pelusium (Port Said, Egypt)―Egypt	
Jan 331	Memphis (Egypt)―Egypt, capital city	
Jan 331	Alexandria (Egypt)―Egypt	
Feb 331	Siwa, oracle (Egypt)―Egypt	
May 331	Tyre (Lebanon)―Phoenicia (Syria)	
?	Damascus (Syria)―Syria	
?	Alep (Syria)―Syria	
Jul 331	Thapsacus (Tipsah) (Dibsi Faray, Euphrates River, Syria)―Mesopotamia	
Jul 331	Harran (Turkey)―Mesopotamia	
Jul 331	Edessa or Urhai (Urfa, Turkey)―Mesopotamia	
Jul 331	Tigris River (Iraq)―Mesopotamia	
Oct 331	Battle of Gaugamela (Tel Gomel, Iraq)―Mesopotamia	
Oct 331	Arbela (Arbil/Irbil, Iraq)―Mesopotamia (ancient Assyria), capital city	
Oct 331	Babylon (on the Euphrates, Iraq)―Babylonia, capital city	
Dec 331	Susa (Iran)―Susiana (Elam), capital city	
?	Battle of the Persian Gate (Darvazeh-ye Fars, northeast of Yasuj, Iran)―Persia	
Jan 330	Persepolis (Iran)―Persia, capital city	
?	Pasargadae (plain of Morghab, Iran)―Persia	
Jun 330	Deh Bid Pass (Zagros Range) to modern Yazd and Esfahan, Iran―Persia/Media	
Jun 330	Ecbatana (Hamadan, Iran)―Media, capital city	
Jun 330	Rhagae (Rey, Iran)―Media	
Jun 330	Caspian Gates (between modern Eyvanakey and Aradan or Tehran and Semnan, Iran, Media/Parthia border)―Media/Parthia	
Jul 330	Alexander's detour from modern Semnan to the Dasht-e-Kavir desert (Iran)―Parthia	
Jul 330	Thara (near Ahuan, between Semnan and Qusheh, Iran) where the Persian king Darius III was killed―Parthia	
Jul 330	Hecatompylos (Shahrud, Iran)―Parthia, capital city	
Jul 330	Zadracarta―Hyrcania, largest city	
Aug 330	Hyrcanian campaign (Caspian Sea/Elburz Range, Iran)―Hyrcania	
Sep 330	Susia (Tus, near Mashhad, Iran)―Parthia	
?	Nisa-Alexandroupolis (Bagir Village, 18 km southwest of Ashgabat, Turkmenistan)???―Parthia	
Sep 330	Artacoana, Alexandria in Aria (Herat, Afghanistan)―Aria, capital city	
Oct 330	Phrada, Alexandria Prophthasia (Farah, Afghanistan)―Drangiana, capital city	
Dec 330	Alexandria in Arachosia (Kandahar, Afghanistan)―Arachosia, capital city	
Winter 329	Alexandria (Ghazni, Afghanistan)―Arachosia	
Apr 329	Ortospana, Kabura (Kabul, Afghanistan)―Gandara	
Apr 329	Cophen River (Kabul River, Afghanistan)―Gandara	
Apr 329	Kapisa, Alexandria in the Caucasus (Bagram near Charikar, Afghanistan)―Gandara, capital city	
May 329	Paropamisus (Hindu Kush, Afghanistan) (Paropamisus is the western part of Gandara)―Gandara	
May 329	Khawak Pass (leading from Badakhshan to Panjshir valley, 100 km northeast of Kabul, Afghanistan)―Gandara	
May 329	Drapsaca (Konduz/Kondoz or Qonduz/Qondoz, Afghanistan)―Bactria	
May 329	Bactra (Balkh, near Mazar-i-Sharif, Afghanistan)―Bactria, capital city	
May 329	Oxus River (Gozan, (Amudar'ja River, Afghanistan/Uzbekistan border)	
May 329	Alexandria Tarmita (Termez/Termiz, Uzbekistan)―Sogdia (or Transoxiana)	
Jun 329	Nautaca (Uzunkir, near Shakhrisabz, between Samarkand and Karshi, Uzbekistan)―Sogdia	
Jun 329	Maracanda (Samarkand, Uzbekistan)―Sogdia, capital city	
Jul 329	Jaxartes River (Syrdar'ya River) and Fergana Valley (Uzbekistan/Tajikistan/Kyrgyzstan)―Sogdia	
Jul 329	Fergana Valley with 7 Achaemenid cities-fortresses, among which Cyropolis or Cyreschata/Kurushkatha (Uroteppa, Tajikistan)―Sogdia	
Jul 329	Alexandria Eschate (Leninabad, Khodzent, Khudzhand or Hudzand, Tajikistan)―Sogdia	
Oct 329	Sogdians and Scythians Massagetes (Spitamenes' revolt) (north of Jaxartes River)	
Nov 329	Maracanda (Samarkand, Uzbekistan)―Sogdia	
Nov 329	Tribactra (Bukhara, Uzbekistan)―Sogdia	
Nov 329	Bactra (Balkh, near Mazar-i-Sharif, Afghanistan)―Bactria	
Spring 328	Alexandria Oxiane/on the Oxus (perhaps Ai-Khanoum/Ay Khanom???) (confluence of the Amudar'ja and Kowkcheh rivers, near Deshitiqala (Badakhshan region), northern frontier of Afghanistan )―Bactria	
?	Alexandria in Margiana (Mary/Merv, Turkmenistan) (founded by Craterus and refounded by Antiochus I and called Antiochia)―Margiana, capital city	
Summer/Autumn 328	Sogdian campaigns and attack of the Sogdian settlements in the Gissarskiy (or Hissar) Range (Pamiro-Alai region, Tajikistan)―Sogdia	
Dec 328	Nautaca (Uzunkir, near Shakhrisabz, between Samarkand and Karshi, Uzbekistan)―Sogdia	
Mar 327	Sogdian Rock or Rock of Sisimithres (where Oxyartes and Roxana were) (Gissarskiy (or Hissar) Range, Pamiro-Alai region, Tajikistan)―Sogdia	
Spring 327	Bactra (Balkh, near Mazar-i-Sharif, Afghanistan)―Bactria	
Spring 327	Kapisa, Alexandria in the Caucasus (Bagram near Charikar, Afghanistan)―Gandara, capital city	
?	Cophen River (Kabul River, Afghanistan/Pakistan)―Gandara	
Sep 327	Passo Khyber/Khyber Pass (Afghanistan/Pakistan)―Gandara	
Autumn 327	Peucelaotis (Charsadda, north of Peshawar, at the Kabul River, Pakistan), occupied by Perdiccas and Hephaestion―Gandara, Pakistan	
Autumn 327	Arigaeum (Arigaion), capital city of the Aspasians (Nawagai, Pakistan), Alexander campaign against Aspasians and Guraei―Gandara, Pakistan	
Autumn 327	Massaca/Massaga, capital city of the Assacenes (Alexander campaign) (Wuch near Chakdara, lower Swat (Soastus) valley, Pakistan)―Gandara, Pakistan	
Autumn 327	Bazira (Bir-Kot/Barikot, lower Swat valley, Pakistan)―Gandara, Pakistan	
Autumn 327	Ora (Ude-Gram/Odigram, lower Swat valley, Pakistan)―Gandara, Pakistan	
Autumn 327	Shang-La Pass, Pakistan (4300m)―Gandara, Pakistan	
Autumn 327	Aornus Rock (Pir-Sar or Pir Sarai, 1600m, at the Indus River, Pakistan)―Pakistan	
Winter 326	Modern Hund, Pakistan (the two Macedonian armies reunited)-Pakistan	
Mar 326	Alexander's detour to Nysa (legend: founded by Dionysius) (near Jalalabad, at the river Chitral or Kunar (Euas) in eastern Afghanistan)―Gandara, Pakistan	
Spring 326	Taxila (Takshaçila, 20 km west from Islamabad, Pakistan)―Pakistan, capital city	
Jul 326	Battle of Hydaspes River against Porus (modern Jhelum, Pakistan)―Eastern Punjab (kingdom of Porus, Pauravas)	
Jul 326	Alexandria Nicaea (west bank of Jhelum, Haranpur???, Pakistan)―Eastern Punjab	
Jul 326	Alexandria Bucephala (east bank of Jhelum, Haranpur???, Pakistan)―Eastern Punjab	
Aug 326	Acesines River (Chenab, Pakistan) (crossing between Gujrat and Sialkot, Pakistan)―Eastern Punjab	
Aug 326	Hydraotes River (Ravi, Pakistan)―Eastern Punjab	
Aug 326	Sangala (near Amritsar, India) (siege against the Mallians)―Eastern Punjab	
31 Aug 326	Hyphasis River (Bias/Beas, India) (the easternmost border of Alexander's expedition, mutiny of the army)―Eastern Punjab	
Sep 326	Alexandria on the Hyphasis (west bank, eastern border of Alexander's empire, near Amritsar, India)―Eastern Punjab	
Sep 326	Return to Hydaspes River (modern Jhelum, Pakistan), Nicaea and Bucephala (Pakistan)―Eastern Punjab	
Nov 326	Departure of the fleet at the Hydaspes River (Pakistan)―Eastern Punjab	
Autumn 326	Death of Alexander and Roxana's first-born son at the Hydaspes River	
Nov-Dec 326	Mallians and Oxydracae campaign (Pakistan)―Eastern Punjab	
Nov-Dec 326	Town of the Brahmans (Harmatelia???, Pakistan)―Eastern Punjab	
Nov-Dec 326	Siege of Multan (capital city of the Mallians (Malava)), Pakistan (where Alexander was seriously wounded by an arrow)―Eastern Punjab	
Nov-Dec 326	Alexandria on the Indus (at the confluence of Indus and Chenab) (Uch, Pakistan) (Alexandria of Opiane???)―Eastern Punjab	
Dec 326	Campaigns against the kingdoms of Musicanus (modern Alor, Pakistan) and Sambus (modern Sehwan, Pakistan)―Sind (capital city Thatta)	
Dec 326	Patala (modern Hyderabad???, Pakistan)―Sindh	
Jul-Dec 325	Expedition of Craterus from Patala to Hormuz: Patala, Bolan Pass, between Sibi and Quetta (Pakistan), Kandahar (Afghanistan), Hamun Lake, Hormuz (Bandare Abbas) (Iran)	
Aug-Dec 325	The return of Alexander: Patala-Hormuz (with Hephaestion)	
Aug 325	Arabius River (Hab River, crossing near modern Karachi, Pakistan)―Sind	
?	Arabitians and Oreitans campaigns, Pakistan―Gedrosia	
Autumn 325	Alexandria Rhambacia (Bela, Pakistan)―Gedrosia	
?	Alexandria in Makarene (120 km west of Karachi, area of Hab River, Pakistan)	
Autumn 325	Gedrosian Desert (Baluchistan (Makran), Pakistan/Iran)―Gedrosia	
Nov 325	Pura (Bampur, Iran)―Gedrosia, capital city	
Dec 325	Alexandria in Carmania (Golashkerd, Iran)―Carmania (capital city Harmozia/Hormuz)	
Sep-Dec 325	Expedition of Nearchus from Patala to Hormuz: Patala, Karachi, Hab River, Sonmiani Bay, Ormara, Pasni, Gwadar, Jask, Strait of Hormuz, Hormuz (Bandar Abbas) (Iran)	
Dec 325	The reuniting at Hormuz―Carmania	
Jan-Feb 324	The return of Alexander from Hormuz to Susa:	
Jan 324	Pasargad (plain of Morghab, Iran) (visit to the tomb of Cyrus the Great)―Persia	
Feb 324	Persepolis (Iran)―Persia	
Feb 324	Susa (Iran)―Susiana (Elam), capital city	
Jan-Feb 324	The return of Hephaestion and Craterus along the coastline of Carmania and Persia (from Hormuz to Susa)	
Jan-Feb 324	The return of Nearchus from Hormuz to Susa: Hormuz, Qeshm Island, Mond River, Karun River, Susa	
Mar 324	The marriages of Susa (Iran)	
?	Persian Gulf, Mouth of the Tigris (Iraq/Iran)―Susiana	
Spring 324	Alexandria in Susiana or Alexandria of Characene, later Alexandria Antiocheia), Karka (Charax, near Al Qurnah, Iraq)―Susiana	
Spring 324	Mutiny of the army at Opis (east bank of the Tigris, not far from the confluence of Tigris and Diyala rivers, south of Baghdad, Iraq)―Babylonia	
Summer 324	Ecbatana (Hamadan, Iran)―Media, capital city	
Oct 324	Death of Hephaestion in Ecbatana (Hamadan, Iran)―Media	
Winter 323	Cossaeans campaign (Loristan/Luristan, Zagros Range, Iran)―Media/Babylonia	
Spring 323	Babylon (on the Euphrates, Iraq)―Babylonia, capital city	
10 or 11 June 323 B.C.	Death of Alexander in Babylon (Iraq)―Babylonia	

== Bibliography ==
- Roger Caratini, Alessandro Magno, Storia e leggenda del più grande condottiero dell’antichità, Newton & Compton editori, 2005
