= Morghab =

Morghab or Murgab (Persian: مرغاب) may refer to:

- Murgab River (Afghanistan)
- Morghab, Afghanistan
- Morghab, Iran, a village in Kerman Province, Iran
- Morghab, Khuzestan, a village in Khuzestan Province, Iran
