= Zurmala Stupa =

Buddhist stupa in Uzbekistan

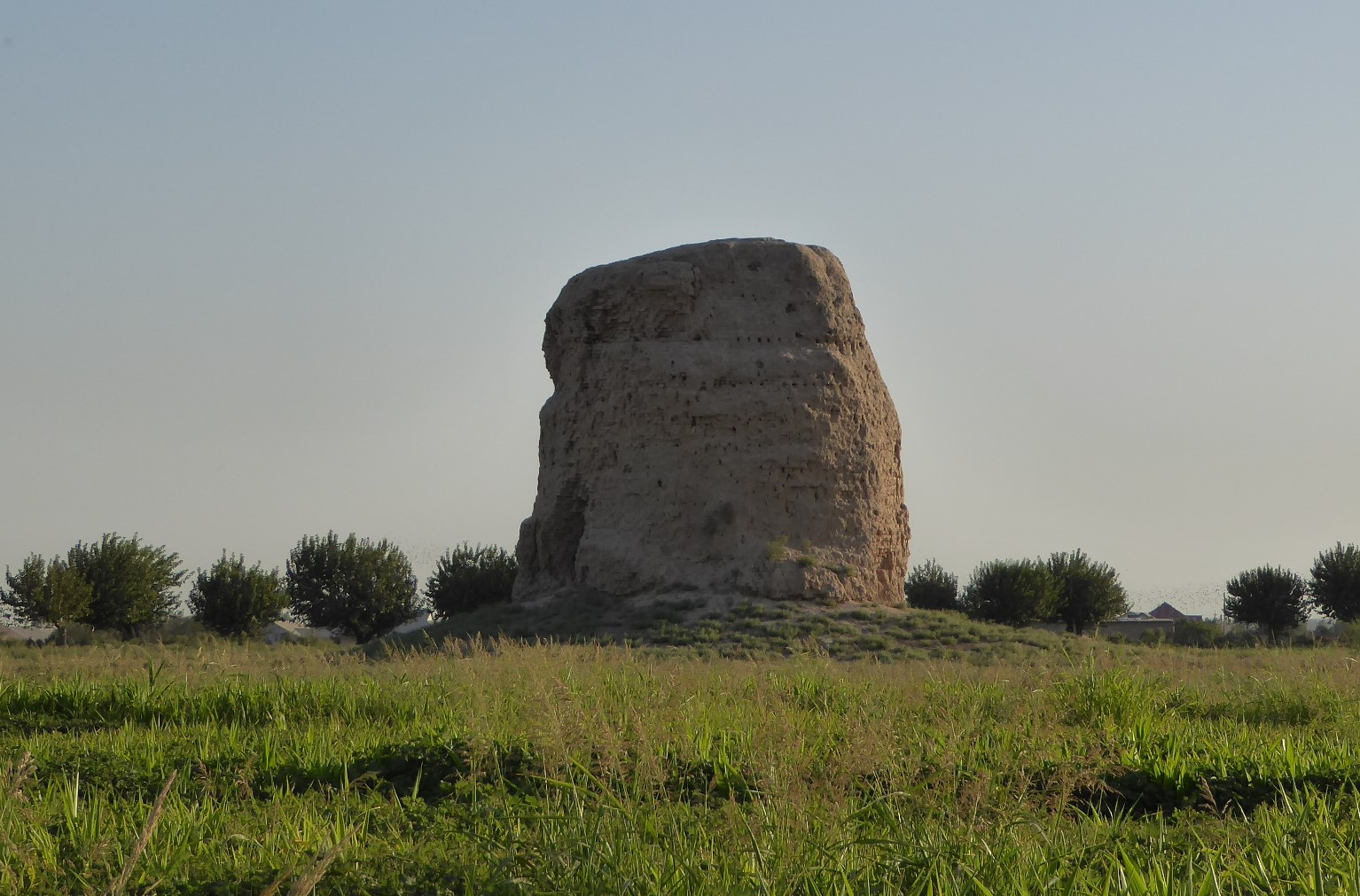

Location
- Location: Termez
- Country: Uzbekistan
- Interactive map of Zurmala Stupa
- Coordinates: 37.2319°N 67.0999°E

Zurmala stupa is a remnant of the largest Buddhist stupa located in Termez district in Uzbekistan. It is considered to be the oldest construction still standing in Uzbekistan. It was built in the first or second century CE.

The stupa is 13.5m tall and has a diameter of about 14 m. It is made up of square bricks. Each of the bricks has a stamp which is similar to one used in Bactria during the Kushan Empire in the 3rd century AD. The fragment of kilned bricks can also be found around the stupa. It is believed that the exterior facade of the stupa was painted a bright red colour. Currently, the stupa has huge cracks around it.

== History ==
The early information about the stupa can be found in the diaries Xuan Jian, a Chinese buddhist priest who visited Termez in 629-630. According to him, there were more than 10 monasteries in Termez and more than 1000 monks. He mentioned that there were many stupas in the area. The study by A.S. Strelkov in 1926–1928 in the expedition by the Oriental Museum of Moscow and the Hermitage Museum of St. Petersburg, noted the similarity with the description of Xuan Jian. Later, M.E. Masson organized an expedition to understand the general features of these monuments.

Archaeologist Alexander Strelkov, who investigated the tower in 1927, assumed that it was a Buddhist stupa. However, this statement was confirmed only half a century later during excavations led by Galina Pugachenkova. As a result of archaeological research of the monument, an assumption was made that its height is 13 meters, with a diameter of 14.5 meters. The monument is rectangular in shape (22 x 16 meters) and built of raw brick in the form of a cylindrical tower topped by a dome with bas-relief sculptures. During excavations many planks up to 3 meters long were found. Presumably the stupa was faced with red burnt bricks and stone blocks with scenes from Buddhist mythology.
