= Qirqqiz Fortress =

9th- and 10th-century Islamic academy

- Qirqqiz qal’asi
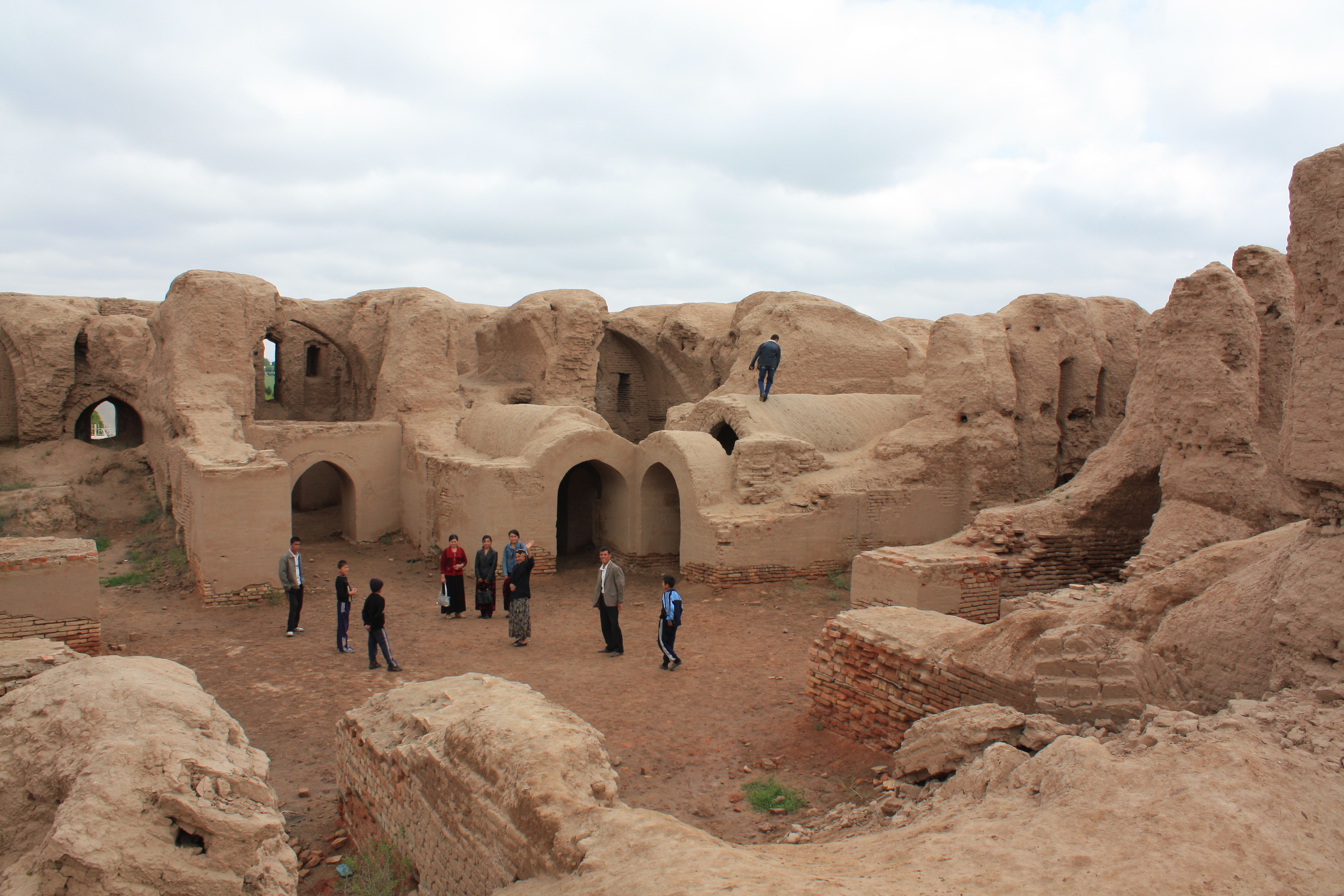
- Qirqqiz Fortress interior
- Interactive map of the Qirqqiz Fortress area
- Former names: Shahri Somon
- Etymology: forty girls

General information
- Type: fortress
- Location: Surxondaryo region, Termiz, Uzbekistan
- Coordinates: 37.2666°N 67.2900°E
- Year built: 9th-15th centuries

Technical details
- Material: mud bricks and fired bricks
- Size: 53.3×54.8m
- Floor count: 2

Design and construction
- Architects: masters from Iran and India

The Qirqqiz Fortress (Uzbek: Qirqqiz qal'asi; meaning: forty girls) is a historical monument in Uzbekistan, the first Islamic academy for girls - located in Surxondaryo region (9-10th centuries). It is preserved in a ruined state in Termiz District . There is no information about the purpose of its construction (fortress, palace, khanqah, caravanserai). There are various hypotheses by researchers about the function of this monument. It is suggested that it was a remote palace, a girls’ madrasa, a khanqah, a caravanserai and other possibilities. The fact that it was located outside the city of Termez in the Middle Ages indicates that the fortress served as an outpost outside the city. It was built in a rigid monumental style according to the directions of the world.

It is currently included in the list of material cultural heritage of Uzbekistan of republican significance.

== Construction ==
Qirqqiz Fortress was built by the Samanids in the 9th century. The construction involved masters brought from Iran and India. The second floor of the building was destroyed during the Mongol invasion in the 12th-13th centuries.

The fortress was rebuilt several times between 9th and 15th centuries.

== Architecture ==
Qirqqiz Fortress is a rectangular(53.3×54.8m), one-story building consisting of two stories. It has 54 rooms. The walls are made of mud bricks (30×30×5 — 5.5cm), and the same size fired bricks are also used in the arches and vaults. The outer side of the fortress is surrounded by a thick wall (the thickness of the outer wall is 2-2.5 meters), the corners are reinforced with massive towers; there are porches covered with domes between the towers, and the niches are decorated in a repetitive style. All the rooms and the central courtyard (11.5×11.5 m) are connected by corridors; the central courtyard is assumed to have been a hall or a domed hall.

Qirqqiz Fortress was built in a rigid monumental style according to the directions of the world. The porch and corridors divide the building into four parts. They are two identical parts, each with five rooms and a corridor surrounded by three sides, the width of the corridor is 2.1 meters. The north-western and north-eastern parts, as well as the two south-western (5 rooms connected by two corridors) and south-eastern (2 rooms and a large guest room with three columns connected by a corridor) parts. The corridors and rooms are lit through the niches in the wall. Qirqqiz Fortress has various types of domes, domes with intersecting arches, other types of domes, arches and vaults. The fortress also had a classroom, a bathhouse, and toilets. Water entered through canals.

The fortress could be entered through the gates on all four sides.

== Naming ==
According to oral information, the heroic girl Guloyim and her 40 friends who repelled the attack of the enemies mentioned in the folk epics lived in this place.

According to another legend, a ruler who had 40 wives wanted to marry a 41st woman. He sent his 40 wives who resisted him to this fortress alive.

The local people believe that the fortress served as the first girls’ academy in the region.

Moreover, until the 20th century, the people called the place of the fortress “Shahri Somon” (City of Saman).

== Usage ==
According to falk epics, at the time when the rule of the Samanids weakened and new struggles for the throne began, a fortress was built near Old Termez. The fortress was a unique school for girls, an academy for studying science and art, and accepted its first students. According to reports, the first students of the academy were the most talented and intelligent 40 girls of the country. For this reason, the people named the fortress Qirqqiz.

The daughters of the rulers of the region studied religious and secular sciences here. The girls who lived in the fortress learned Islam, medicine, arithmetic, astronomy and chemistry, weaving and military affairs. They were advanced, intelligent and outstanding scientists of their time. They died during the invasion of Genghis Khan. According to the legends, the Mongol soldiers did not know that the defenders of the fortress were girls, and attacked with great force. Despite this, the girls defended the fortress heroically, and died due to their lack of strength. The veil of the last defender opened, and shocked the Mongol soldiers.

At one time, this building also functioned as a medical complex.

== Archaeological research ==
In 1926, the expedition conducted by the Museum of Oriental Culture studied Qirqqiz for the first time, and the expedition member V. Zgura described the monument as a small palace or a fortress outside the city. He compared it to the Khigarka fortress near the Froth River, built by Harun al-Rashid(786-809). V. Zgura stated that the monument was not built near the water and was destroyed by the Mongols in the 13th century. At the same time, in 1927, the second expedition of the Museum of Oriental Culture was conducted under the leadership of B.N.Zasipkin. Zasipkin carried out excavation works in the central part of Qirqqiz Fortress. In his 1928 report, he identified that there was a dome in the lower part of the monument, which was later destroyed. He dated Qirqqiz to the period before the Mongols and called the monument a khanqah. In his 1948 research, he estimated that the complex was built in the 8th-9th centuries. In 1936, the TAKE expedition led by M.Y. Masson studied the monument and attributed it to the 6th-7th centuries. According to G.A.Pugachenkova, it was a remote palace outside the city. Later research suggested that it was built in the Early Middle Ages and that the place was called “Shahri Somon” and that the monument was related to the Samanids. In 1940, B.V. Veymarn called Qirqqiz a caravanserai. In 1983, Z.Hakimov discovered a large fire in the area of the monument during his excavations. E.V.Rtveladze dated the coins found from the ashes to the 14th-15th centuries, and one coin to the 12th century. The Termez archaeologist T.J.Annayev conducted extensive scientific research at Qirqqiz in 2016 and estimated that the building was built in the 14th-15th centuries.

== Gallery ==
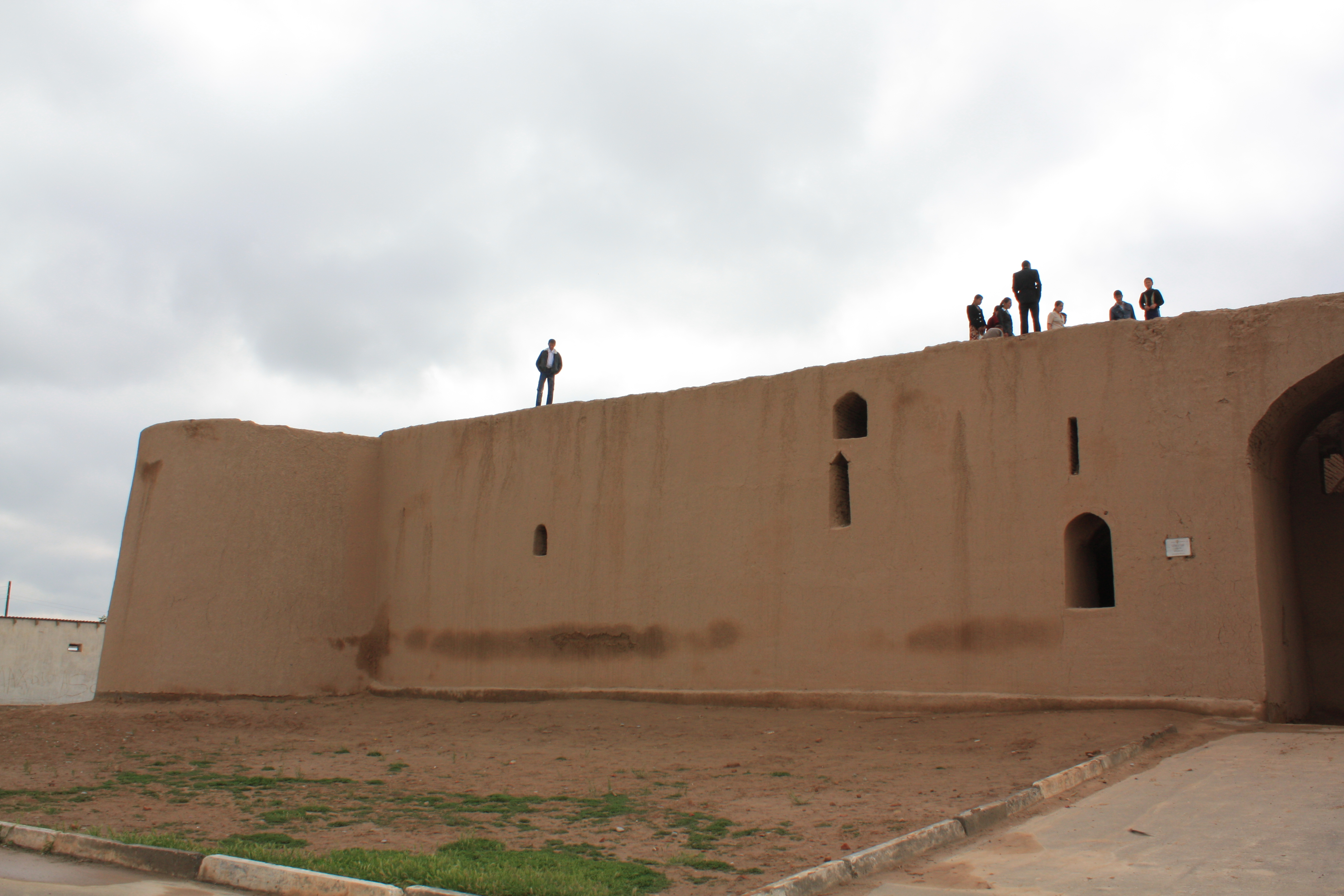
Qirqqiz Fortress exterior

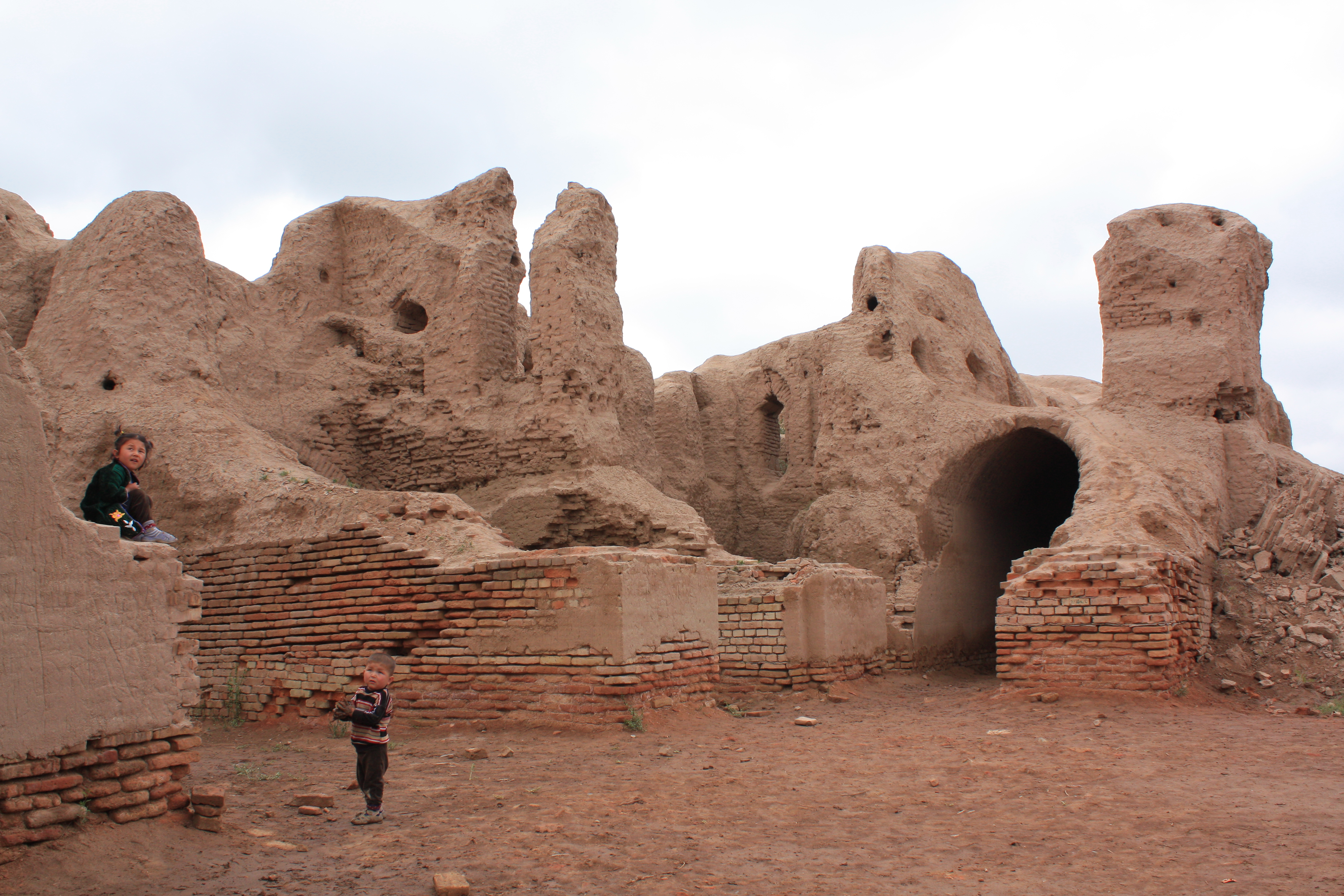
Qirqqiz Fortress interior

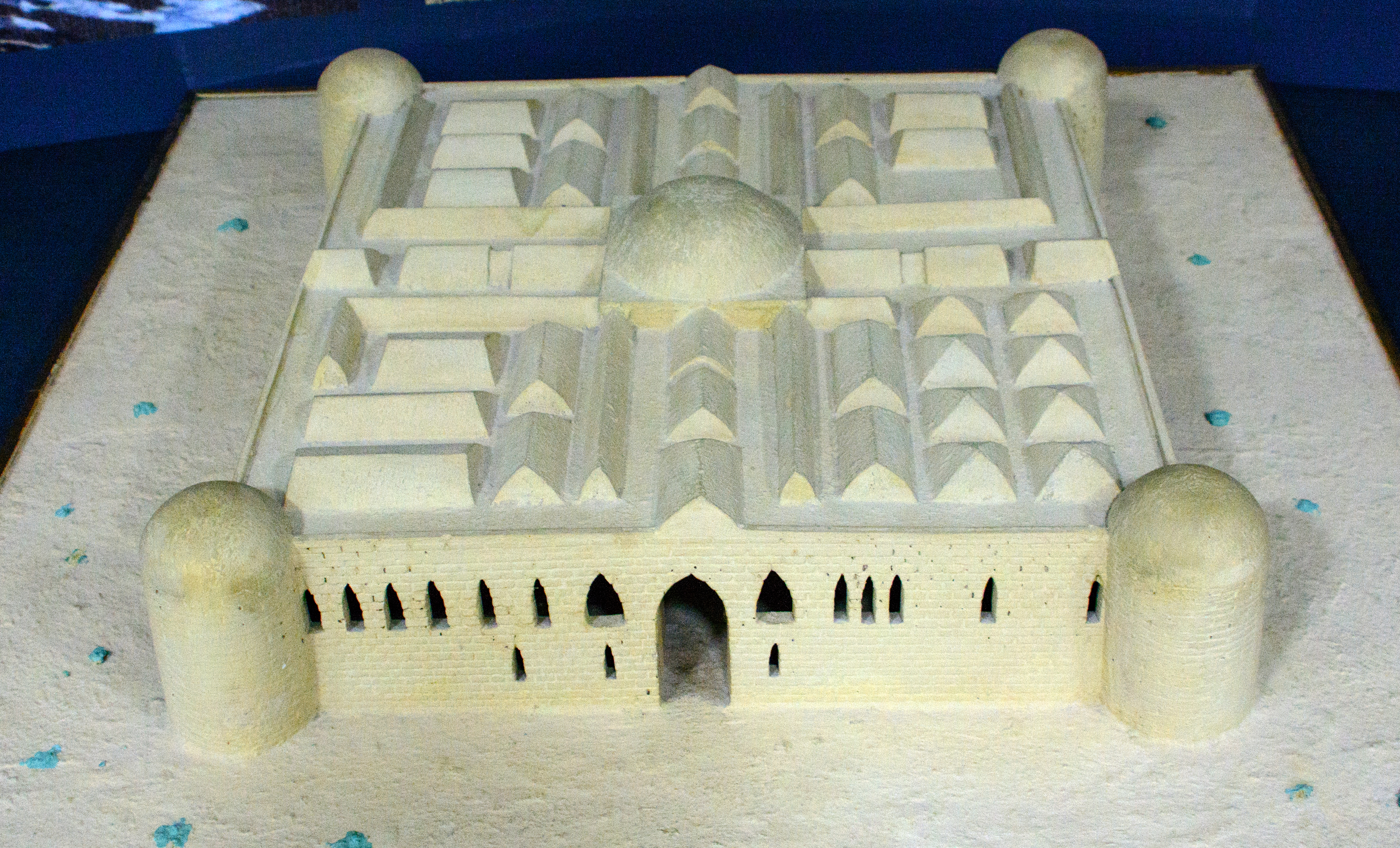
