= Sultan Saodat =

Coordinates: 37.2630°N 67.3092°E

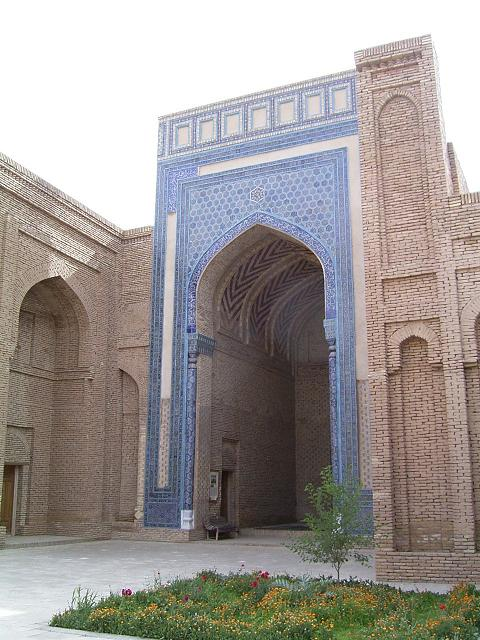

Sultan Saodat is a complex of religious structures located on the outskirts of modern Termez, in Uzbekistan.

The complex of Sultan Saodat, which was formed between the 10th and 17th centuries, holds the graves of the influential Sayyid dynasty of Termez. The Termez Sayyids claimed direct descendancy of the Islamic prophet Muhammad. The founder of the family is presumed to be Termez Sayyid Hassan al-Amir, descendant of Husayn ibn Ali, the grandson of Muhammad. Another historical tradition mentions that Sultan Saadat (Sodot) is the Sultan of Sayyids and the owner "Sultan Saodat" Mausoleum in Termez city – and Sultan Saadat is Sayyid Ali Akbar Termizi, who is also mentioned with the nickname (kunyat) Abu Muhammad, and is presumed to have died at the end of the 9th century or early in the 10th century in Termez.

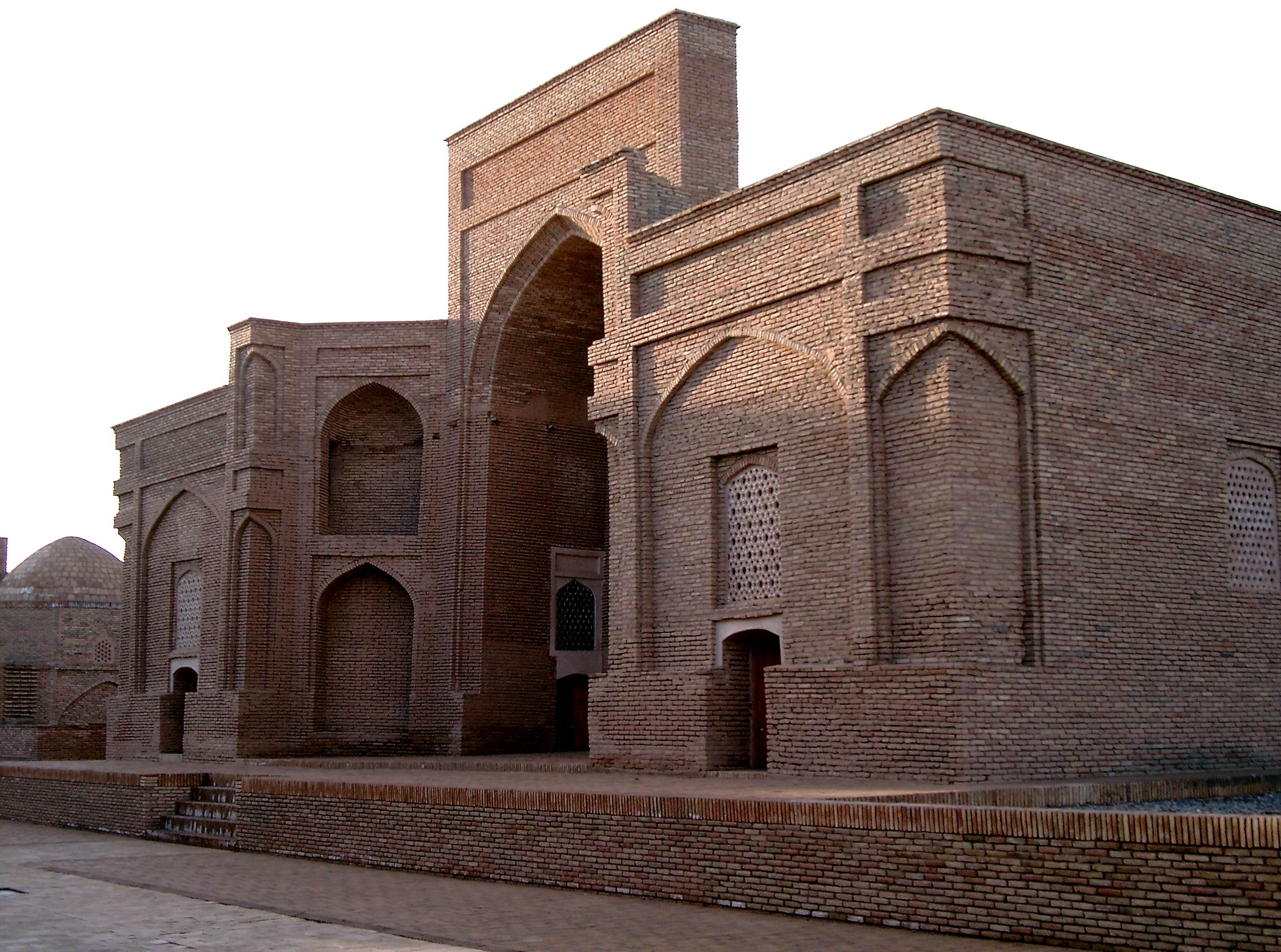
Sultan Saodat Komplex Seit

Sultan Saodat complex is a series of religious structures – mausoleums, mosques and khanaqa – built around a central passage. The oldest here are two large single-chamber, square, domed mausoleums (10th century). They are united by a 15th-century iwan.

In the second half of the 15th century two new buildings were built in front of the two mausoleums. Two parallel rows were built in the 15th–17th centuries and joined with the other buildings. Also, some new mausoleums were also pairwise connected with intermediate iwan; their decorations no longer exist. In the 16th–17th centuries courtyards to the south and the north were built up with mausoleums of different sizes and from different eras. The entrance was set up on the west side of the yard. The majestic ensemble stands out as a group of mausoleums, homogeneous in structure and decoration, though built in different styles.

== See also ==
- Muhammad ibn Ali al-Hadi
