= Termizi Memorial Complex =

- Termiziy meʼmoriy majmui (Uzbek)
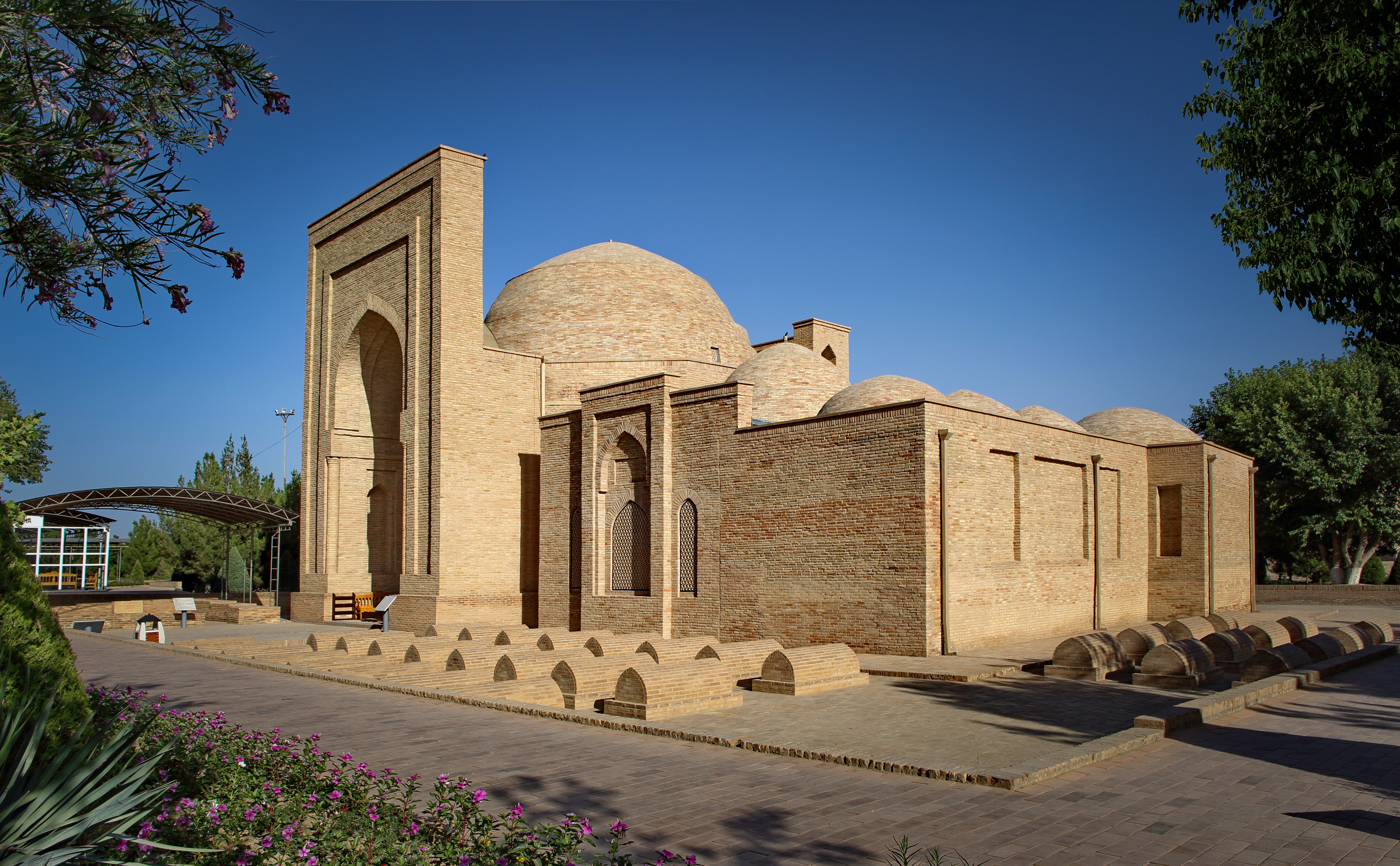
- Termizi Architectural Complex
- Interactive map of Termizi Memorial Complex
- 37°15′57″N 67°11′21″E
- Location: Termez, Uzbekistan
- Nearest city: Termez

History
- Built: 9th-15th century
- Built for: Mausoleum

Site notes
- Restored: 1980—1981, 2001—2002

Termizi Memorial Complex, Hakim Termezi Mausoleum, is a historical site in Termez (9th–15th centuries), Uzbekistan. Al-Hakim al-Termezi Mausoleum, considered sacred for Muslims, is situated in the ancient part of Termez. It houses the tomb of Abu Abdullah Muhammad Hakim Termezi, a prominent Islamic scholar, author of various philosophical and religious works, and the founder of a group of dervishes. The complex is associated with Abu Abdullah Muhammad Hakim Termezi (approximately 750–760 Termez – 869). This mausoleum houses the grave of Termezi. The Termezi Memorial Complex has been reconstructed several times throughout the centuries. Today, this complex is considered one of the primary pilgrimage sites for visitors and guests of the province.

== Structure ==
The complex includes buildings such as a mosque, a mausoleum, quarters, and a room for religious retreats. The total area of the complex is 28.0 x 29.0 meters, with the mausoleum itself measuring 5.10x4.70 meters. According to tradition, initially, a room for religious retreats (9th century), initially made of clay bricks, was constructed, where Hakim Termezi is believed to have lived and taught. A portion of the spacious hall of the building is preserved with thick walls and an earth-filled "hujra" in the northeast corner. Over time, a mausoleum was constructed by digging to the south using clay bricks above the grave, adjacent to the southwest corner of the room for religious retreats (9th century). Later, the mausoleum's eastern wall was attached to create a smaller room, the mausoleum of his son, Al-Hakim Abdullah (10th century). A mosque, resembling a corridor with three domes, and additional rooms were added in the north (11th–12th centuries).

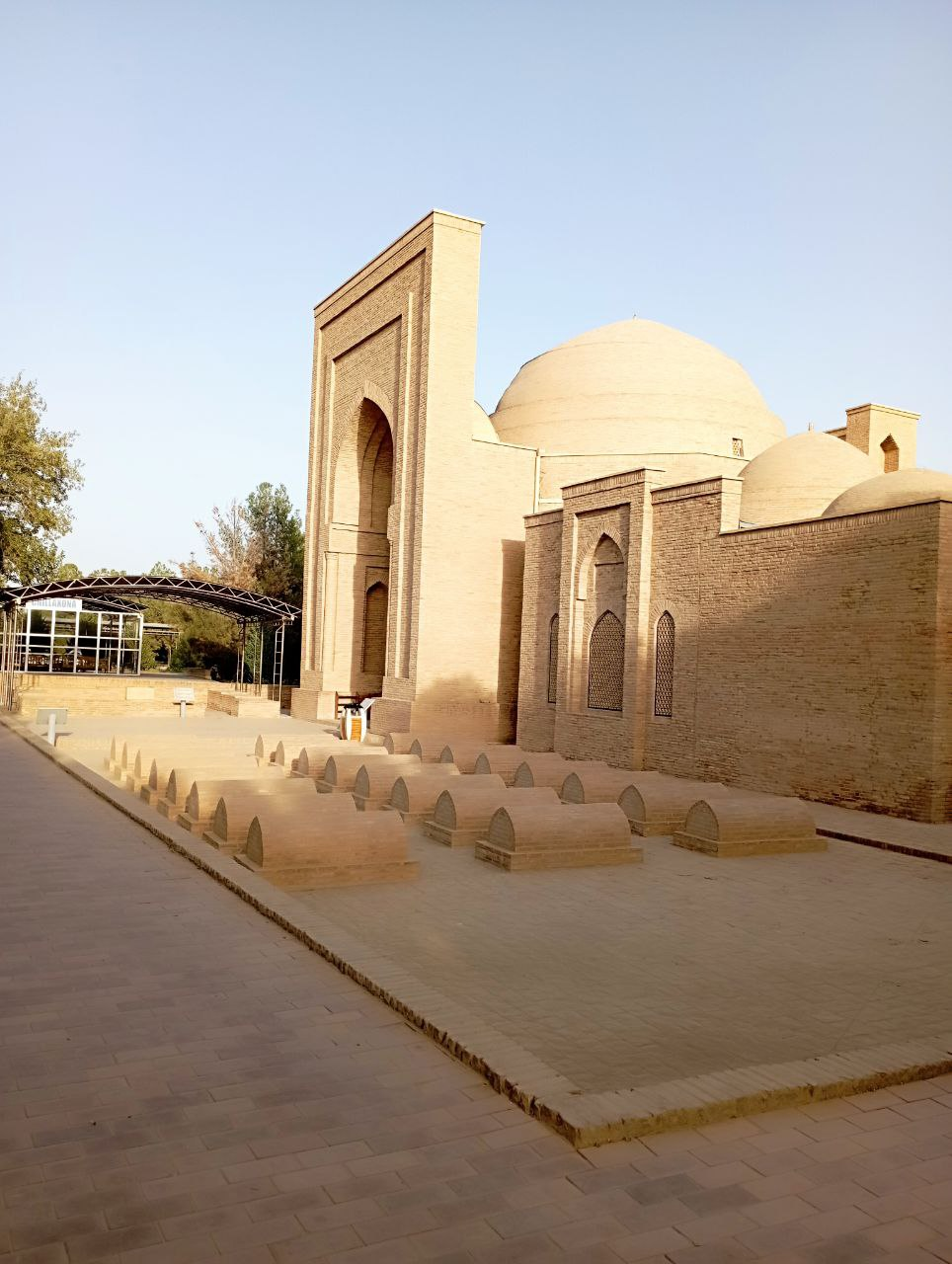
Termizi Memorial Complex

Additionally, there are ancient cellars within the At-Termezi complex. These cellars are considered to be a historical architectural heritage dating back to the 5th–10th centuries. The complex is also known among the locals as Termiz-ota. He was martyred – according to legend, his enemies strangled him with a scarf at the city gate (end of the 9th century). A dome was erected over the mausoleum, and within the building are very delicate coverings. The attention is drawn to the stone grave, adorned with unique and rare carvings and Arabic inscriptions. Adjacent to the ensemble was a later-built Friday mosque. In the At-Termizi complex, there are several other intriguing places of interest: ancient cellars dating back to the 5th–10th centuries, the ruins of the ancient city of Tarmita (Old Termez), Termez city, and the Termez Archaeological Museum.

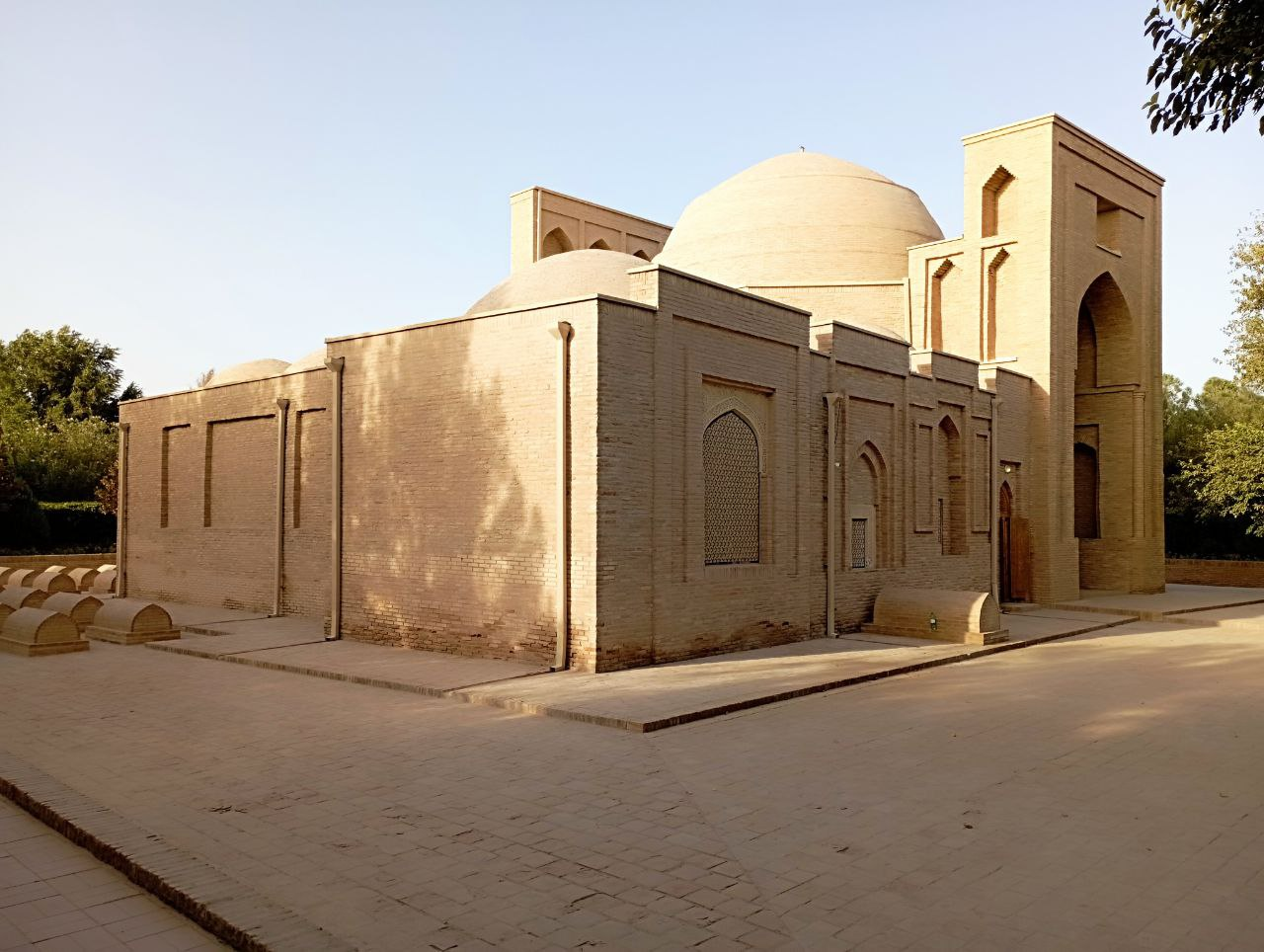
Termizi Memorial Complex

=== Mausoleum ===
Hakim at-Termizi is considered a famous Sufi figure. According to scholars, there are more than 400 works attributed to him, of which about 60 have reached us. Hakim at-Termizi was killed by his enemies and his grave was covered. Later, he was buried in this complex. The memorial consists of four sections (rooms) built in a square-shaped structure. Due to the construction of a courtyard in the northeast, the number of rooms was reduced to three. The mausoleum adjacent to the courtyard is domed with a slightly conical, cylindrical style. The mausoleum has a dome and its own mihrab. Its floor is significantly lower than the courtyard, separated by central pillars. The mausoleum is adorned with precious coverings. Six arches are embedded in its exterior walls. Restoration work on the Termizi mausoleum was carried out in 1996 on the occasion of the 660th anniversary of Amir Temur's birth.On the entrance of Hakim at-Termizi's mausoleum, a series of sentences in Arabic script are inscribed. The inscription reads:

"Allah Ta'ala reminds: 'Enter here with peace and security'".

== Repairings ==
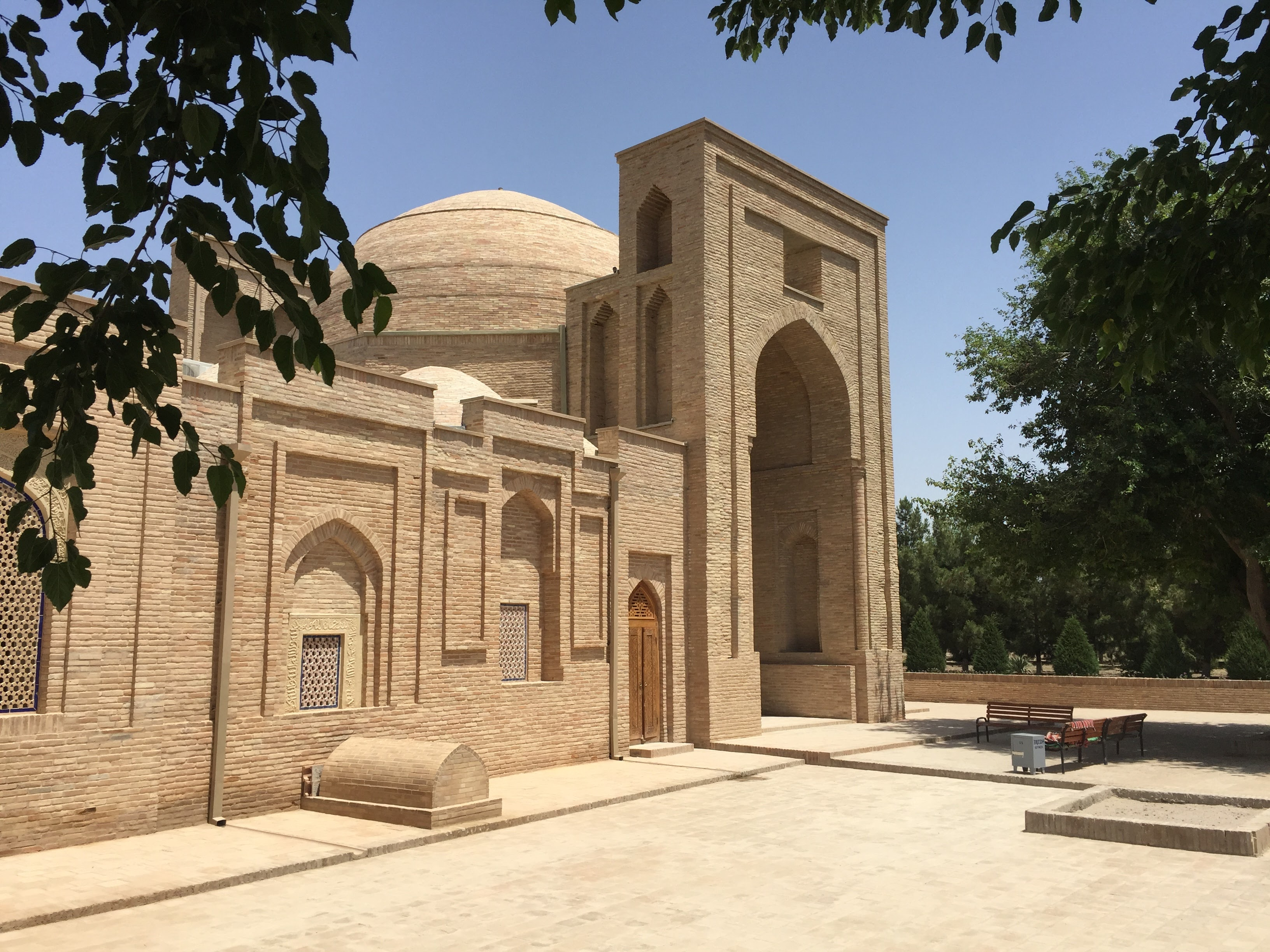
Termizi Memorial Complex

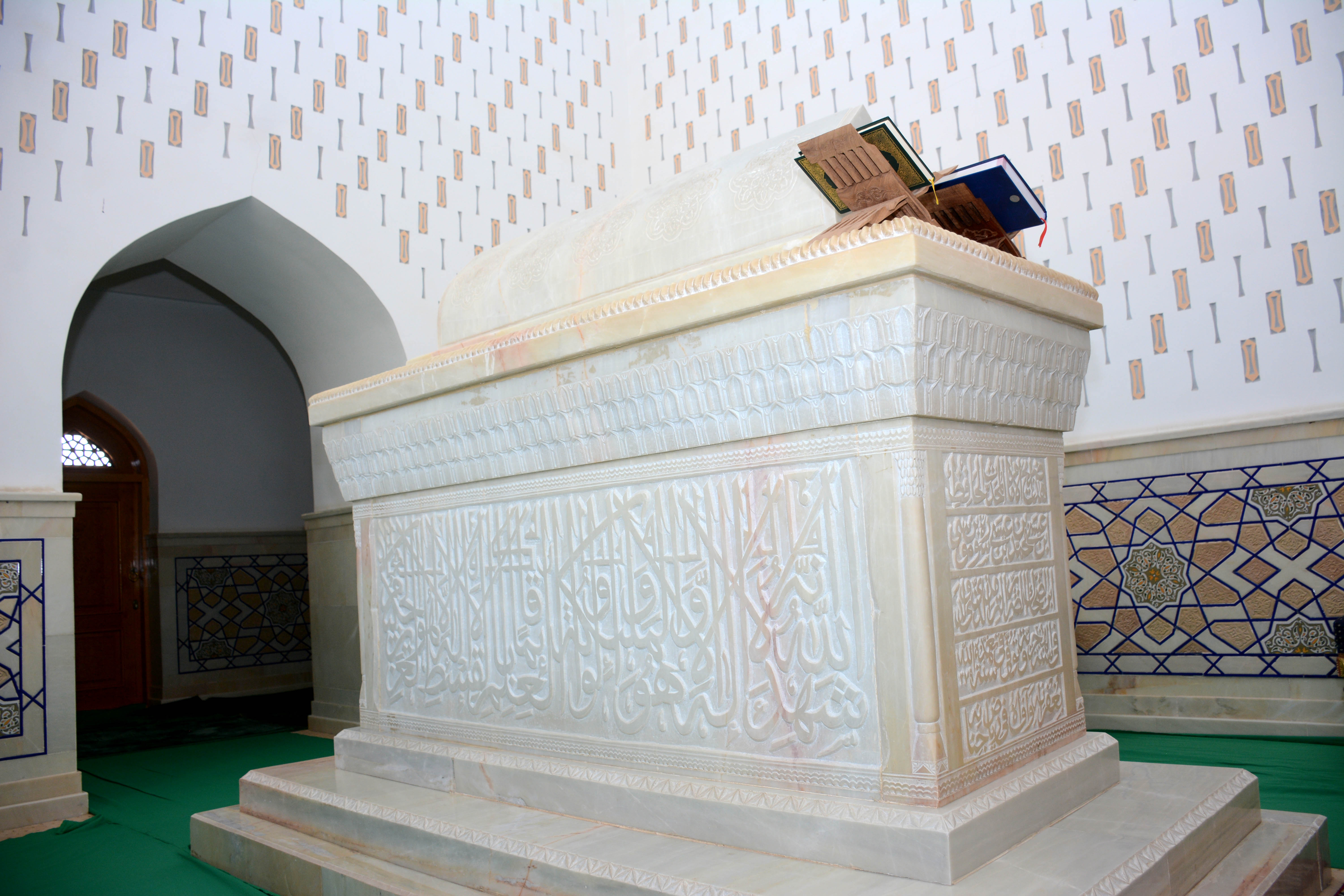
Termizi Memorial Complex

During the Timurid reign (15th century), the higher foundation of the quarters (1.5m high) was rebuilt using brickwork. The rooms attached to it underwent renovation. The northern and southern sides of the quarters were plastered. The simple yet precisely constructed walls of the quarters display projections in a "diamond" pattern. The mausoleum of Hakim Termizi was one of the quarters built in the 9th century. The mosque with three domes on the west side of the courtyard adjoins the mausoleum, facing three arches into the courtyard. The western wall of the mosque contains a spacious mihrab. There are embossed inscriptions, stalactite forms, and decorative terracotta tiles on the floor, giving it a unique appeal. The mosque's walls are adorned with tiled mosaics. The passage from the mosque leads to the mausoleum. Inside the mausoleum, a glazed tile with intricate designs covers the grave in geometric patterns. Quranic verses from Surah 36 are inscribed under the dome's base. The interior of the quarters is adorned with star-like geometric patterns.

The windows of the arches are fitted with grilles. The use of white marble inside the mausoleum represents the high art of the Timurid period. The marble work includes a three-tiered sarcophagus with Islamic ornamentation and inscriptions, a central section of three decorative niches adorned with muqarnas vaulting, and a depiction of two shining stars on the sides. The inscriptions on the marble depict the life and activities of Termizi.

Renovation work has also been carried out on the smaller mausoleum. During the Abdulla Khan reign (16th century), a nine-domed mosque (including the old mosque) was constructed within the current courtyard. An elegant vaulted roofed entrance is positioned in front. In the 19th century, a four-domed mosque was built in place of the nine-domed mosque. Towards the south, another mausoleum (comprising a burial vault and a pilgrimage site) was built, connected to the Termizi mausoleum and quarters through arched passages.

The Termizi Memorial complex was studied scientifically and restored to its 14th–15th-century appearance between 1955 and 1957. Restoration work was carried out on the mausoleum and quarters in 1980–1981 and 2001–2002. The marble tomb was transferred from its original place to the Termiz Museum. In its place, a replica was created by artisans and installed. The mausoleum underwent several renovations and was reopened for visits multiple times.
