= Termez =

Ancient city in Uzbekistan

Termez Termiz / Термиз (Uzbek)
- District-level city
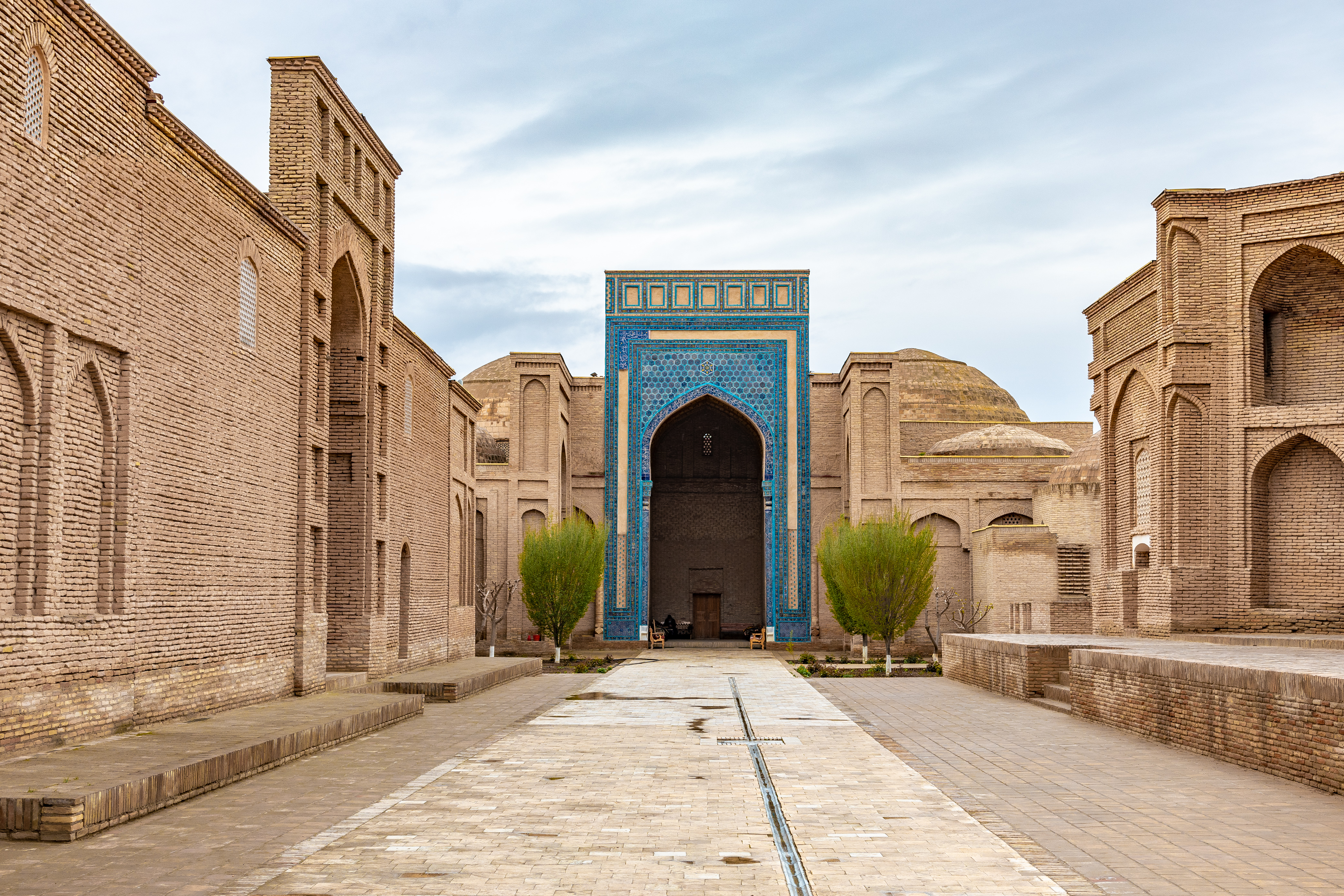
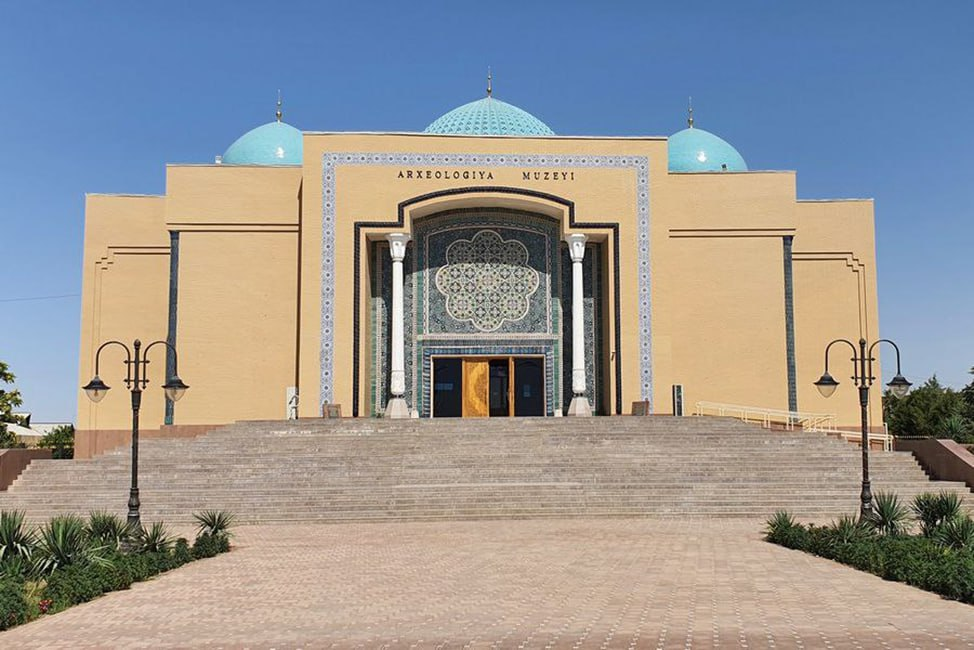
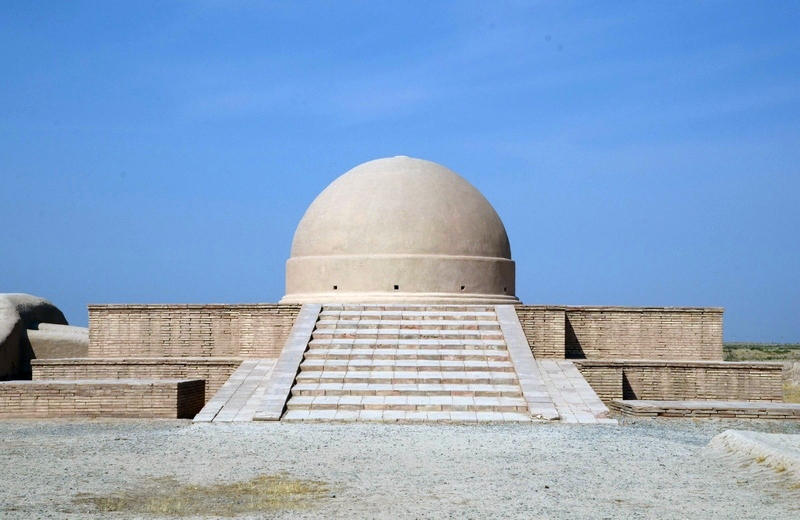
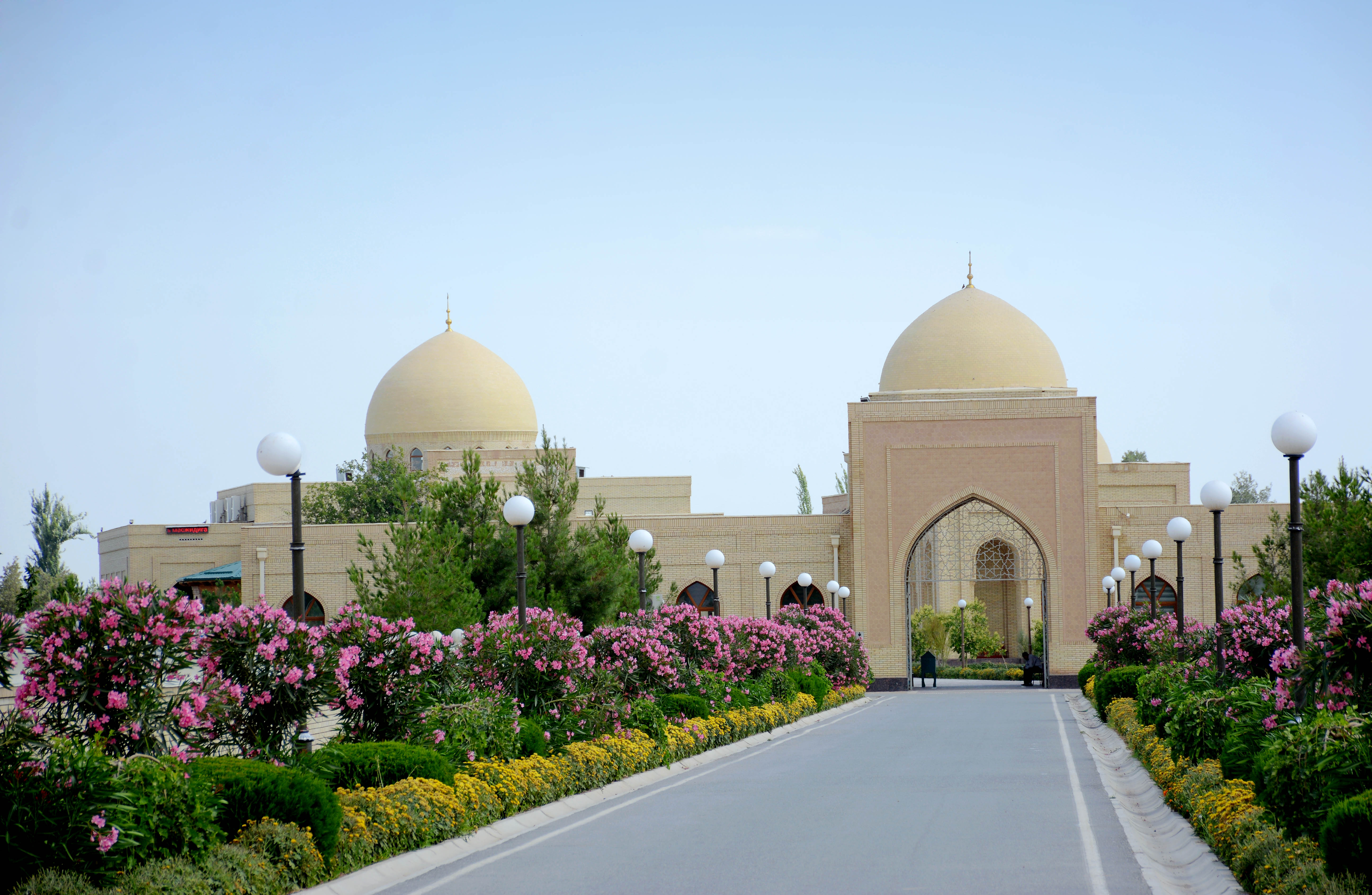
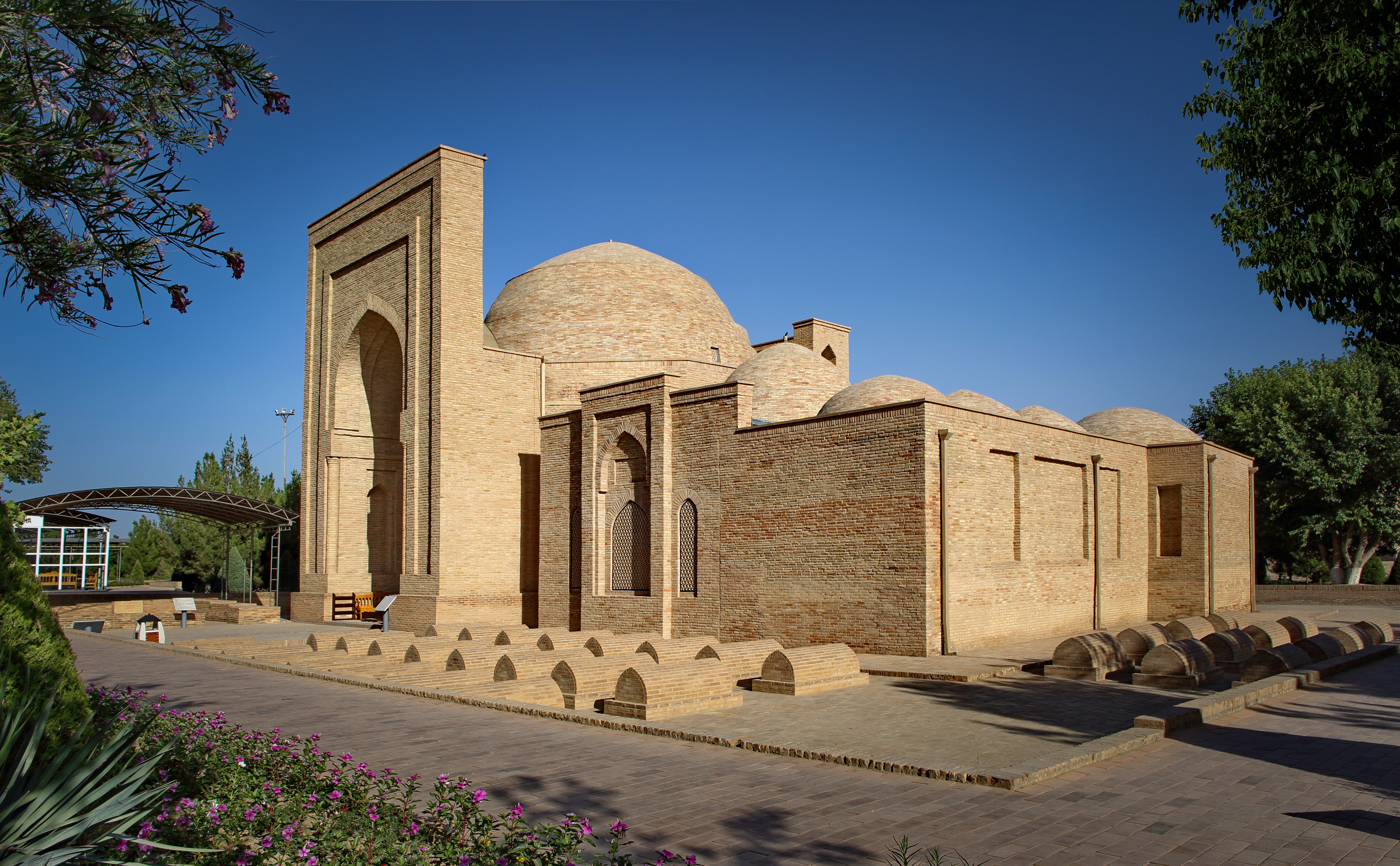
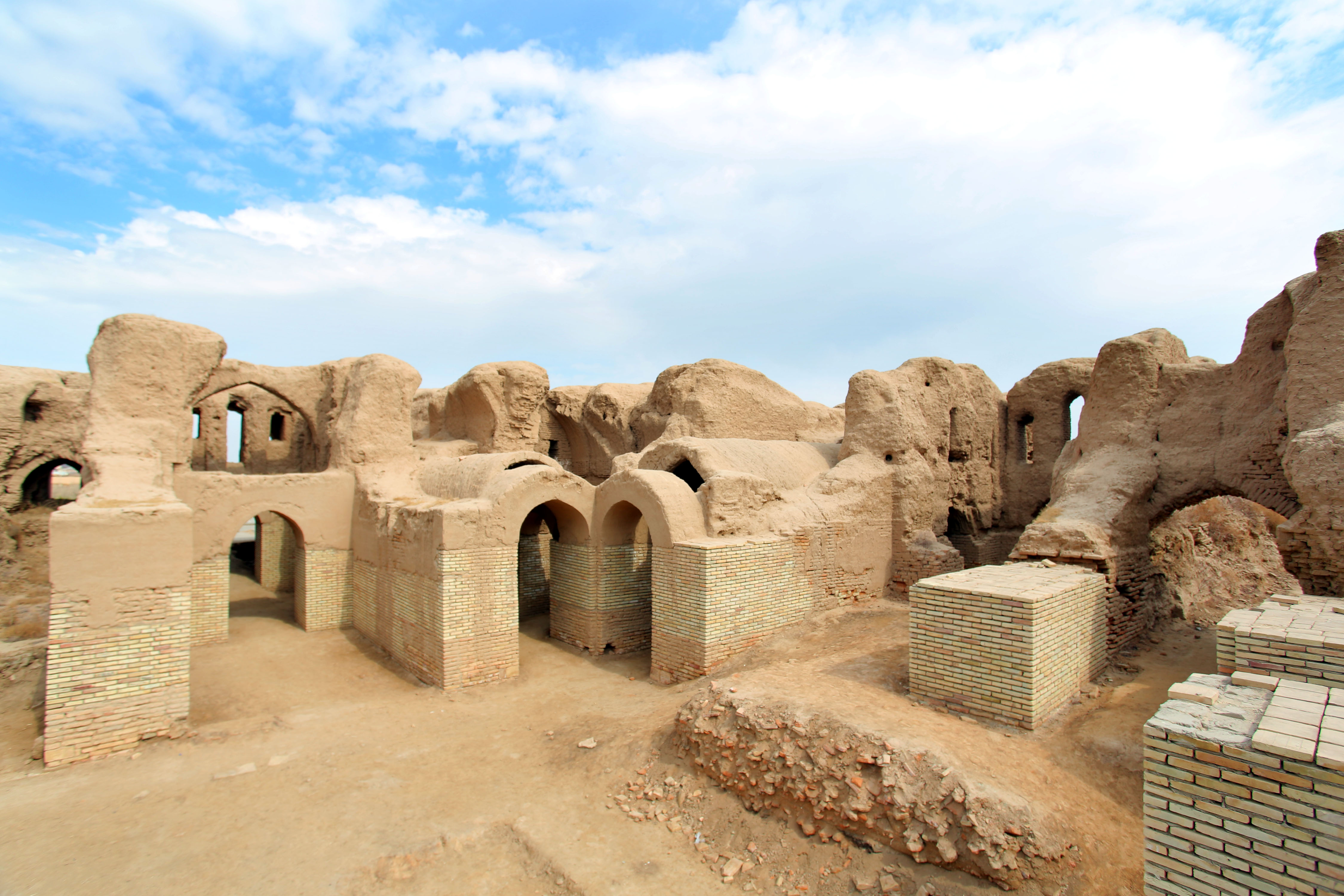
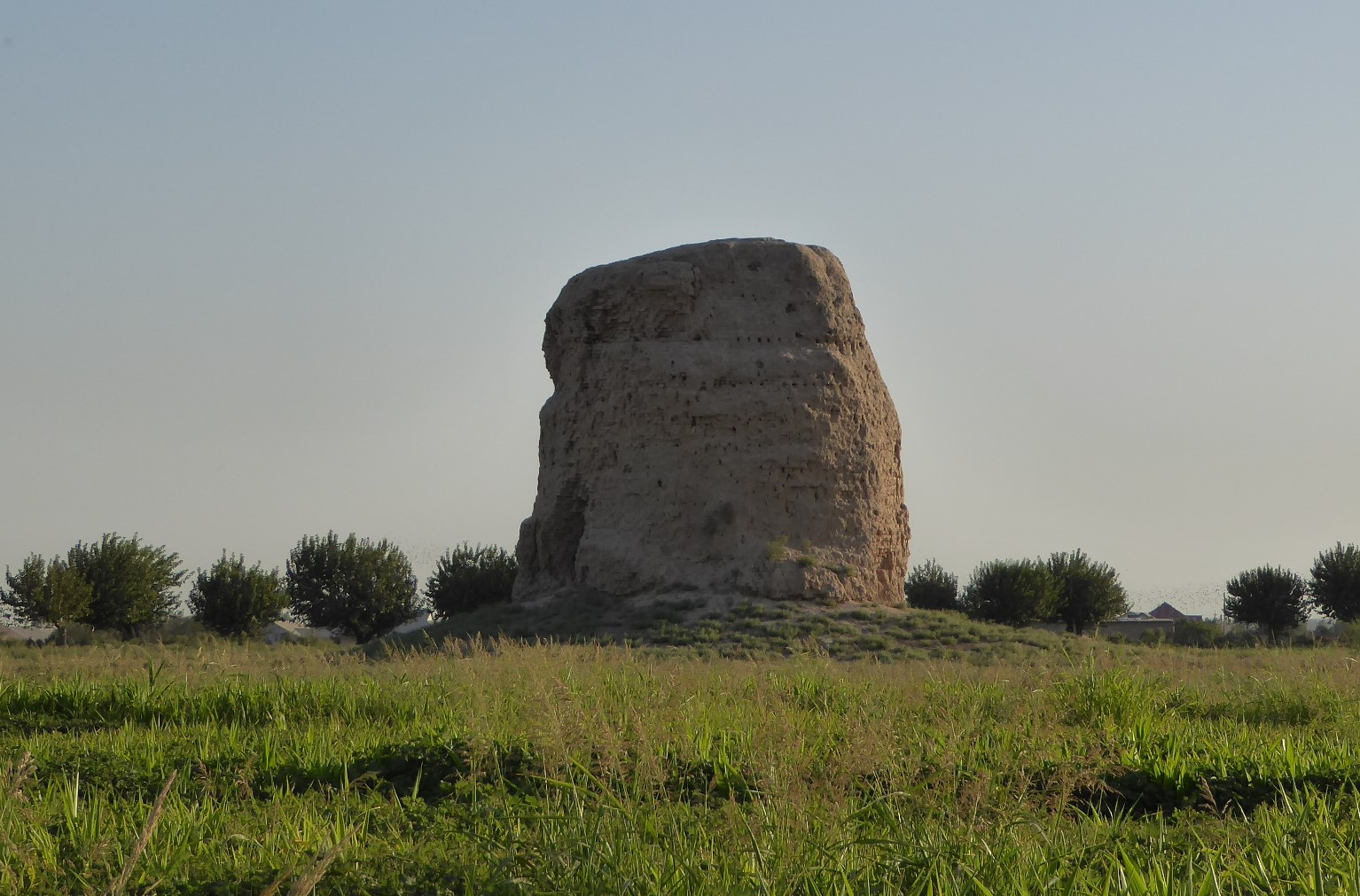
- Sultan Saodat Complex Archaeological Museum Fayaz Tepe Hakim at-Termizi Mausoleum Termizi Memorial Complex Kirk Kiz Fortress Zurmala Stupa

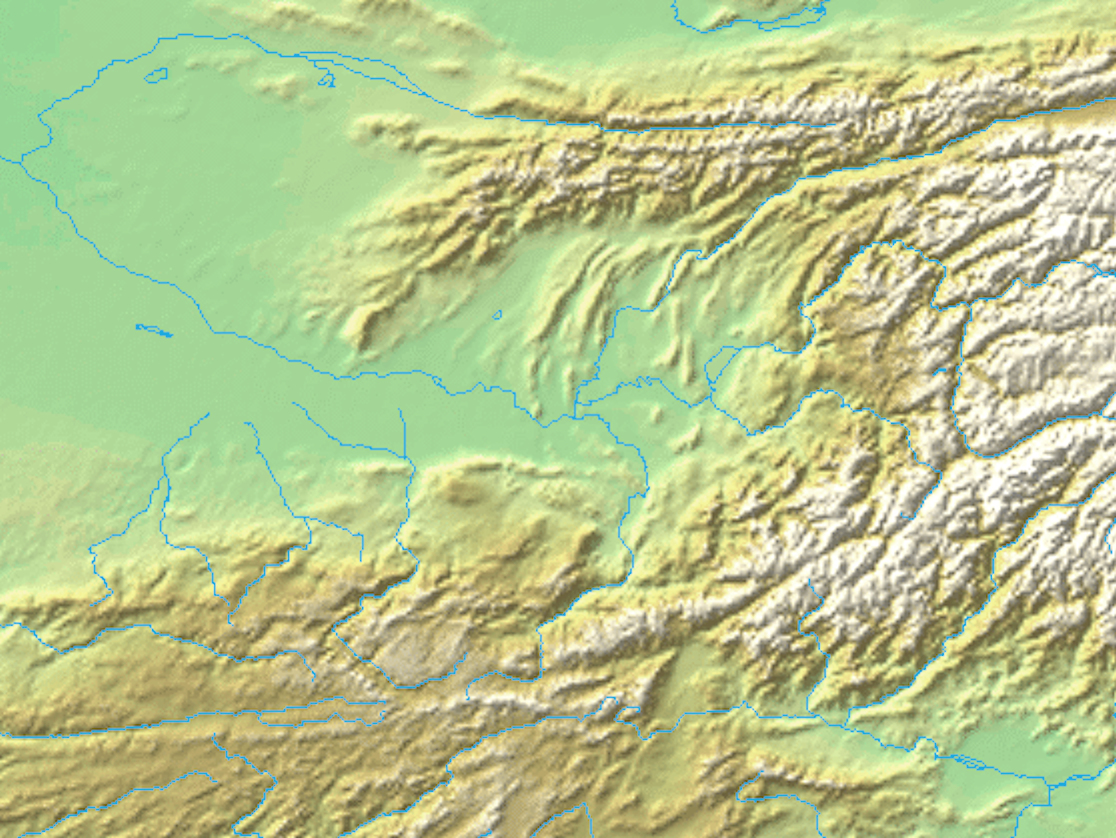
- Location in Uzbekistan Termez (Bactria) Termez (West and Central Asia)
- Coordinates: 37°13′N 67°17′E
- Country: Uzbekistan
- Region: Surxondaryo
- Founded: 5th century BC

Government
  - Type: City Administration
  - Hokim (Mayor): Sharofiddin Lolaev

Area
  - Total: 36.0 km^{2} (13.9 sq mi)
- Elevation: 302 m (991 ft)

Population (2021)
  - Total: 182,800
  - Density: 5,080/km^{2} (13,200/sq mi)
- Demonym(s): Termizlik (Uzbek); Termezian
- Time zone: UTC+05:00
  - Summer (DST): UZT
- Postal code: 190100
- Area code: (+998) 76
- Website: https://gov.uz/en/termizsh

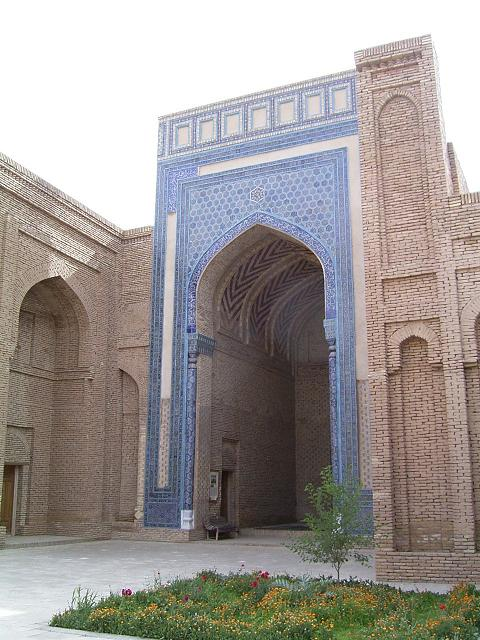
Sultan-Saodat Mausoleum

Termez (/tɜːrˈmɛz/ tər-MEZ) (Note: Uzbek: Termiz/Термиз [tʰerˈmɪz]; Tajik: Тирмиз Tirmiz [tʰɪrˈmɪz]; Persian: ترمذ Termez [tʰeɹˈmez]; Arabic: ترمذ Tirmidh [tʰɪrˈmɪð]; Hindustani: तिरमिज़/ترمذ Tirmiz [tɪɾˈmɪz]; Russian: Термез [tʲɪrˈmʲez]; Chinese: 铁尔米兹 Tiěrmǐzī [tʰjèɚ̀mìtsɹ̩́]; Ancient Greek: Θέρμις Thérmis [tʰérmis̠]) is the capital of Surxondaryo Region in southern Uzbekistan. Administratively, it is a district-level city. Its population is 182,800 (2021). It is notable as the site of Alexander the Great's city Alexandria on the Oxus, as a center of early Buddhism, as a site of Muslim pilgrimage, and as a base of Soviet Union military operations in Afghanistan, accessible via the nearby Hairatan border crossing.

== Etymology ==
Some link the name of the city to the Greek word Θέρμος (thermos), meaning "hot", and date the toponym to the rule of Alexander the Great. Others suggest that it came from Sanskrit तर्मतो (tarmato), meaning "on the river bank".

== History ==
=== Ancient times ===
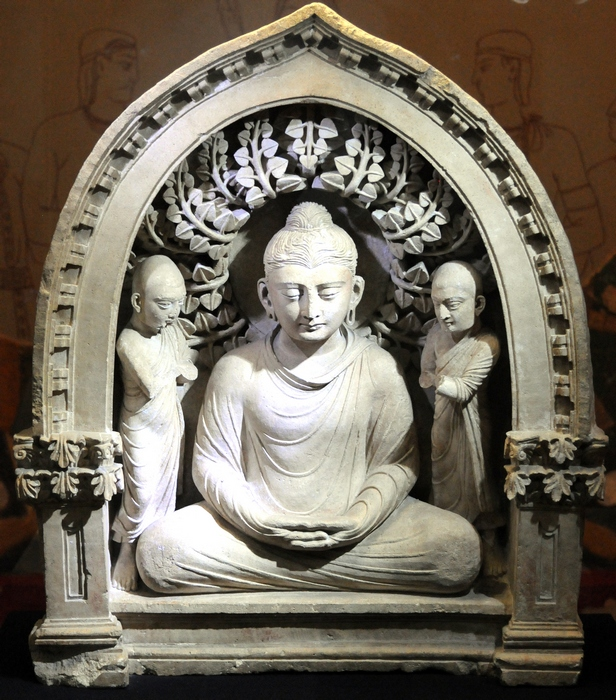
Buddha with monks, from Fayaz Tepe.

One of Central Asia's oldest towns, Old Termez, located a few kilometers west of the modern city along the Amu Darya river, was established sometime before the 3rd century BC. The city may have been known to the Achaemenids (the 10th century Shahnameh purports its existence during the mythological Zoroastrian Kayanian dynasty).

In 329 BC Alexander the Great conquered the surrounding region, known as Sogdia. Most recent scholarship argues that Termez is the site of Alexandria on the Oxus, though some identify this site with Ai-Khanoum. After a period of Seleucid rule, Termez became part of the breakaway Greco-Bactrian Kingdom. The Ionian Greek language persisted in the area through the Tocharian period, being phased out of administrative use during the time of the Kushan Empire, in favor of the Bactrian language.

It was during this period that Termez, named Ta-li-mi (迭里迷) in Chinese sources, became an important center of Mahāsāṃghika Buddhism. Termez was incorporated into the Sassanid Persian Empire in the 3rd century AD, and elements of Zoroastrian-Buddhist religious syncretism appear in the archaeological record, with Buddhist monasteries containing fire altars, and a graffiti inscription referencing "Buddha-Mazda." Most inscriptions of the Kushan and Kushano-Sasanian periods come from Termez, in particular from the Buddhist monasteries of Kara-tepe and Fayaz-tepe.

During the 7th century, Termez played host to the Buddhist monk and traveler Xuanzang, who reported:

There are about ten Sangharamas with about one thousand monks. The stupas and the images of the honoured Buddha are noted for various spiritual manifestations.

— Xuanzang, Great Tang Records on the Western Regions

In the three decades that followed, as the Umayyads conquered the Persians, Termez found itself across the river from the caliphate.

=== Islamic Golden Age ===
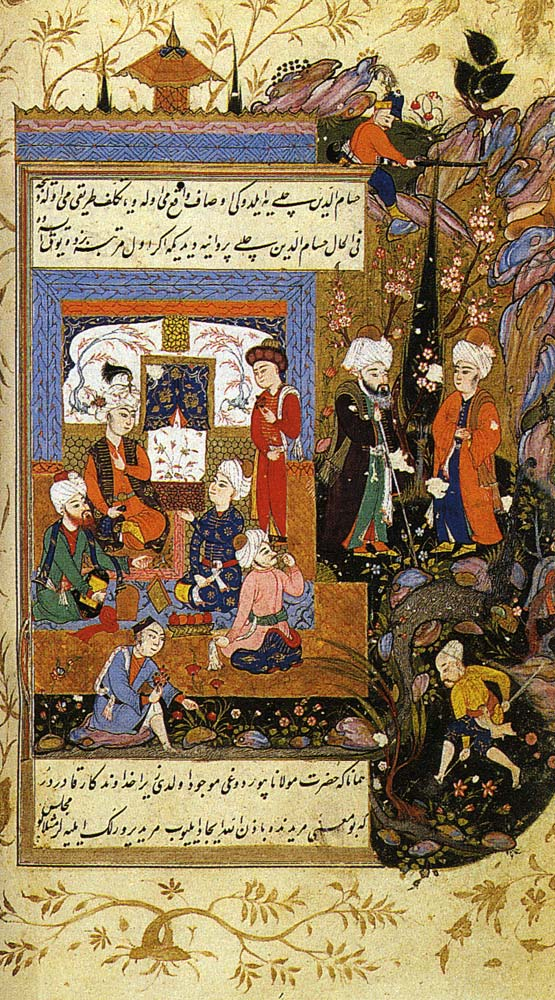
Termez is the setting of some of the stories in Rumi's Masnavi.

In 676 the city was conquered by the Umayyad Caliphate.

It again rose to religious significance during the Abbasid and Samanid empires, producing notable scholars such as the renowned hadith scholar al-Tirmidhi and Sufi master and theologian al-Hakim al-Tirmidhi.

Termez passed through the hands of the Ghaznavid, Seljuk, Karakhanid, and Khorezmshah kingdoms from the 11th to 13th centuries.

In 1220 after a two-day siege, the city was destroyed by the troops of Genghis Khan. According to one account, "all the people, both men and women, were driven out onto the plain, and divided in accordance with their [the Mongols'] usual custom, then they were all slain."

Ibn Battuta found the city reconstructed in the early 14th century:

We set out from Samarqand and reached Tirmidh [Termez], a large town with fine buildings and bazaars and traversed by canals. It abounds in grapes and quinces of an exquisite flavour, as well as in flesh-meats and milk. The inhabitants wash their heads in the bath with milk instead of fuller's earth; the proprietor of every bath-house has large jars filled with milk, and each man as he enters takes a cupful to wash his head. It makes the hair fresh and glossy . . . The old town of Tirmidh was built on the bank of the Oxus, and when it was laid in ruins by Tinklz [Chingiz] this new town was built two miles from the river.

— Ibn Battuta Travels in Asia And Africa 1325–1354

The restored Termez soon came under the rule of Tamerlane's Timurid Empire with the backing of the Tirmidh Sayyids, a local religious aristocracy claiming descent from Muhammad through Sayyid Ali Akbar. The Timurids held the territory until it became a part of the independent Emirate of Bukhara in the 16th century.

By the second half of the 18th century the city was again abandoned, and the ruins of the reconstituted Termez laid outside the nearby villages of Salavat and Pattakesar (Pattagissar).

=== In the Russian Empire and the Soviet Union ===
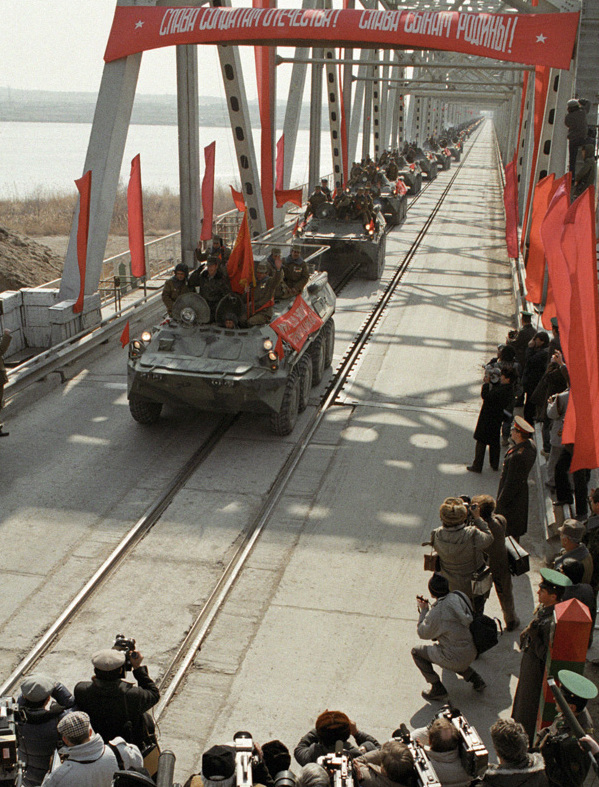
The last column of soviet BTRs leaves Afghanistan in 1989.

In 1887, the Russian Empire began to operate a brown water navy on the Amu Darya River.

In December 1894, the Amu Darya Fleet was joined by the 31st Amu Darya Border Brigade. In the coming years troop levels were increased, as the 4th Orenburg Cossack Regiment, the 13th Turkestan Special Battalion, and the 2nd Orenburg Cossack Battery were relocated to the area.

The Emirate of Bukhara acquiesced to increasing demands from the Tsarist government for more lands, until on January 27, 1900, over 9,000 acres were donated to Russia, and the Russian military began a program of Russian resettlement to the area.

In the immediate aftermath of the Russian Revolution, Pattakesar became a part of the Bukharan People's Soviet Republic, and then the Uzbek Soviet Socialist Republic. In 1928, as part of the Soviet Union, Pattakesar was renamed and took the city's ancient name of Termez. In 1929, the village became a town.

During the years of Soviet rule, as Termez became a hub of Russian military activity, many industries were developed, and a pedagogical institute and a theatre were opened. Termez saw a significant increase in industrial development during World War II, as the Soviet Union replaced industrial centers in the western regions that had been disrupted by Nazi attacks.

For many years after the Second World War the 108th Motor Rifle Division, the former 360th Rifle Division, was based in the town. During the Soviet–Afghan War (1979–1989), Termez became an increasingly important military post, with over 100,000 Soviet troops stationed there. A military airfield and the Afghanistan–Uzbekistan Friendship Bridge, a combined bridge over the Amu Darya, were built. In 1989, Soviet forces withdrew from Afghanistan via the Termez bridge, bringing the conflict to an end.

=== 21st century Afghan conflicts and aftermath ===
In 2001, Germany began operating a base in Termez. The military airfield was the main support base for German and Dutch forces operating with the ISAF for transiting goods into Afghanistan. It was closed in 2015.

Following the 2021 Taliban offensive and resultant Fall of Kabul, the Biden administration reached out to Uzbekistan, as well as Kazakhstan and Tajikistan, to ask if they might temporarily accommodate up to 9,000 Afghans who might face reprisals for working with U.S. military forces. By the 5th of July, the state security services had constructed a refugee camp in Termez to brace for an Afghan refugee crisis. Uzbek president Shavkat Mirziyoyev reported that 494 Afghans were evacuated through the Termez Airport.

In August 2021, Russia and Uzbekistan held joint military exercises outside of Termez.

== Transportation ==
The river Amu Darya divides the two countries of Uzbekistan and Afghanistan and the Afghanistan–Uzbekistan Friendship Bridge crosses the river to Hairatan in Afghanistan. Termez is also served by Termez Airport, with flights to Tashkent and Moscow. Termez is connected with Uzbek Railways to other cities of the country and Mazar-i-Sharif, Afghanistan. The Tashkent–Termez (no. 379) and Termez–Tashkent (no. 380) trains run every day. Dushanbe–Kanibadam (no. 367) and Kanibadam-Dushanbe (No: 368) trains also pass through Termez.

Plans exist to connect Termez to Peshawar by rail, as a part of the China–Pakistan Economic Corridor, and China's larger Belt and Road Initiative.

There is public transportation in the city, represented by buses and marshrutkas. There are also public and private taxi services. Termez river port (Termiz daryo bandargohi) is located in the south-eastern part of the city.

The city has an international airport "Termez", which has regular air connections with Tashkent, with some other major cities of Uzbekistan, as well as with some Russian cities, including Moscow and St. Petersburg.

Termez is the main southern gateway of Uzbekistan. 12 km east of Termez, the Amu Darya River is crossed by the pedestrian, highway and railroad cross-border bridge Hairatan (also known as the Afghanistan–Uzbekistan Friendship Bridge), which is the only border crossing between Uzbekistan and Afghanistan. Every day, people, cars, trucks and freight trains pass over the bridge in both directions.

The city is one of the main railroad hubs of southern Uzbekistan. It is from Termez that the international freight railroad leading to the Afghan city of Mazar-i-Sharif begins.

In fact, the railroad goes all the way to Mazar-i-Sharif International Airport, 8 km east of that city. The distance between Termez and Mazar-i-Sharif is about 80 km by road or rail. As of 2024, the Afghan part of this line is not open for passengers.

== Demographics ==
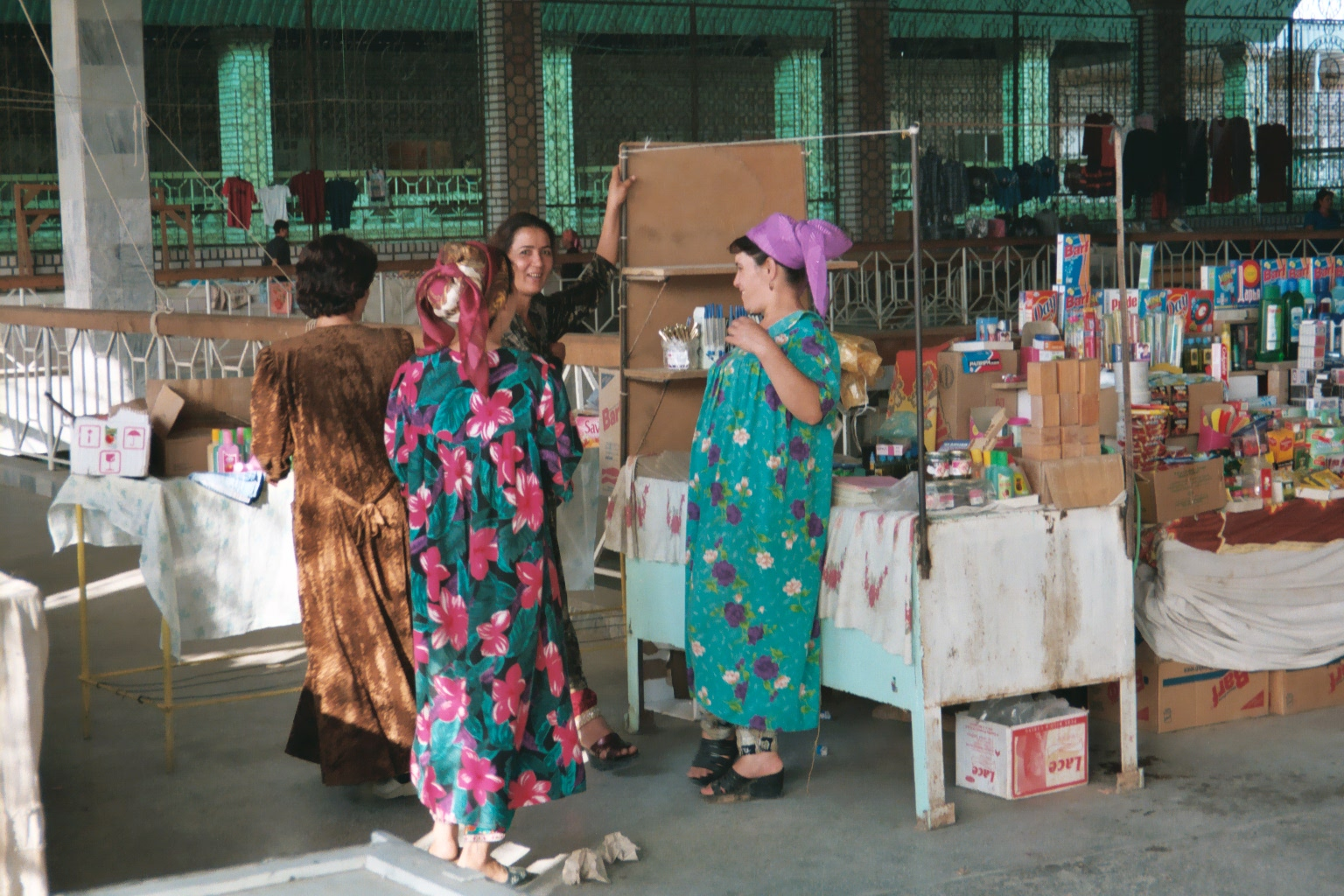
Stall-holders in a Termez bazaar

The estimated population of Termez in 2021 was 182,800. Uzbeks and Tajiks are the largest ethnic groups. An undetermined number of Lyuli live in Termez.

A 2014 World Bank report found that the population of Termez grew by 50% in the period between 1990 and 2014. Using satellite data, Termez was classified as a "Type 3" city, having a "Growing Population & Declining Economic Activity." This report was issued, however, before the presidency and economic reforms of President Shavkat Mirziyoyev.

== Education ==
In 1992 the Pedagogical Institute was upgraded to Termez State University. Termez is also served by the Termez Branch of Tashkent Medical Academy, Termez Technical University, and the Termez Branch of Tashkent State Agrarian University.

There are 26 secondary schools in Termez, six of which offer instruction in the Russian language. A presidential school opened in 2021.

== Climate ==
Termez has a cool arid climate (Köppen BWk) bordering upon a hot arid climate (BWh) with long, sweltering summers and short, cool winters.

Climate data for Termez (1991-2020, extremes 1936-present)
Month	Jan	Feb	Mar	Apr	May	Jun	Jul	Aug	Sep	Oct	Nov	Dec	Year
Record high °C (°F)	23.9 (75.0)	30.1 (86.2)	37.3 (99.1)	39.1 (102.4)	43.6 (110.5)	47.0 (116.6)	47.0 (116.6)	46.3 (115.3)	41.5 (106.7)	37.5 (99.5)	33.5 (92.3)	26.7 (80.1)	47.0 (116.6)
Mean daily maximum °C (°F)	10.7 (51.3)	13.4 (56.1)	19.6 (67.3)	26.9 (80.4)	33.2 (91.8)	38.2 (100.8)	39.8 (103.6)	38.0 (100.4)	33.0 (91.4)	25.9 (78.6)	17.9 (64.2)	12.0 (53.6)	25.7 (78.3)
Daily mean °C (°F)	4.6 (40.3)	6.9 (44.4)	12.7 (54.9)	19.2 (66.6)	25.0 (77.0)	29.5 (85.1)	30.8 (87.4)	28.6 (83.5)	23.4 (74.1)	16.9 (62.4)	10.4 (50.7)	5.5 (41.9)	17.8 (64.0)
Mean daily minimum °C (°F)	−0.2 (31.6)	1.8 (35.2)	6.8 (44.2)	12.1 (53.8)	16.1 (61.0)	19.4 (66.9)	20.0 (68.0)	17.3 (63.1)	13.7 (56.7)	9.1 (48.4)	4.7 (40.5)	0.7 (33.3)	10.1 (50.2)
Record low °C (°F)	−23.9 (−11.0)	−21.7 (−7.1)	−7.9 (17.8)	−2.0 (28.4)	−0.1 (31.8)	11.4 (52.5)	12.9 (55.2)	9.3 (48.7)	4.6 (40.3)	−4.2 (24.4)	−11.0 (12.2)	−18.4 (−1.1)	−23.9 (−11.0)
Average precipitation mm (inches)	22.9 (0.90)	29.6 (1.17)	31.5 (1.24)	24.3 (0.96)	9.5 (0.37)	1.3 (0.05)	0.2 (0.01)	0 (0)	0.5 (0.02)	3.0 (0.12)	20.0 (0.79)	17.8 (0.70)	160.6 (6.33)
Average precipitation days (≥ 1.0 mm)	10	11	11	9	6	2	0	0	1	3	8	9	70
Average rainy days	7	10	11	8	5	1	1	0.2	0	3	6	8	60
Average snowy days	4	3	1	0.03	0.1	0	0	0	0.03	0.1	1	3	12
Average relative humidity (%)	77	71	66	57	45	36	36	38	45	53	65	76	55
Mean monthly sunshine hours	151.5	155.5	207.7	266.5	340.4	378.1	394.5	369.0	322.8	267.9	184.4	150.7	3,189
Source 1: Pogoda.ru.net
Source 2: NOAA

== Entertainment and culture ==
=== Sports ===
Termez hosts the Surkhon Termez football club, which plays in Alpomish Stadium.

Termez also has a kurash training facility, and a hippodrome where kupkari is played.

Various competitions are often held here. At the end of May 2022, Termez now hosted the Uzbekistan kurash championship among juniors born in 2007–2008.

=== Historical and archaeological sites ===
- Termez Archaeological Museum opened in 2002 to commemorate the 2,500th anniversary of Termez. It exhibits archaeological finds and other historic artefacts from sites across Surxondaryo Region. The modern building has a turquoise domed roof and an attractively tiled facade. It is one of the largest and best museums in Uzbekistan. There are around 27,000 items in the collection.

Much of the museum's collection focuses on Termez's Buddhist history, in particular the Graeco-Bactrian and Kushan eras. There are scale models of archeological sites including Kampir Tepe, Fayaz Tepe, and Khalchayan; and magnificent wall paintings and sculptures, as well as coins, ceramics, and even ancient chess sets.

- Kyr Kyz (The 40 Girls Fortress) takes its name from a Central Asian legend about a princess and her 40 companions who defended their land against invaders. Although this monument is called a fortress, archeologists believe it was actually either a caravanserai or a summer palace. It was built during the 9th century in the Samanid period. Although it is now in ruins, it is still possible to see the 54m long mud brick walls, which in places are two storeys high. One section has been restored so you are able to compare the old and the new.
- The Al Hakim At-Termizi architectural complex dates from the 10th to 15th centuries. It is centred on the mud brick mausoleum of Al Hakim At-Termizi, a Sufi saint, jurist, and writer who died in Termez in 859. The site was expanded and improved at the instigation of Timur's son, Shah Rukh, in the 15th century.
- The Sultan Saodat architectural ensemble developed in stages between the 10th and 17th centuries. It was the family necropolis of the Termez Sayyids, a politically and religiously influential local dynasty which claimed descent from Ali. There are approximately 120 graves in the complex, as well as a number of religious buildings. The mortar holding the mud bricks together is an unusual mixture of clay, egg yolk, camels’ blood, and milk. There are pre-Islamic decorative symbols on some of the buildings, including a Zorastrian star motif which represents infinity and fertility.
- The Kokil Dara Khanagha was built by Abdullah Khan II of Bukhara in the 16th century. The building was created as a resting place for itinerant Sufi dervishes and other holy men. It has cultural links with various buildings in Afghanistan, including the styling of the vaulted ceiling. There is no central courtyard as this order of Sufis didn't whirl, but instead focused on quiet, solitary meditation.
- Kara Tepe is a rock cut Buddhist temple complex founded in the 2nd century AD on the hills outside Termez. It is right on the Uzbek–Afghan border, and so a permit is required to visit. The site includes cave cells (which were used as burial sites once the temple was abandoned in the 4th century), a series of brick buildings, and small stupas. It is similar in design to other Buddhist temples built in Gandhara.
- Fayaz Tepe is a Buddhist monastery, most of which dates from the 1st to 3rd centuries AD. The main stupa (which is now encased in a protective dome) could be much older. Fayaz Tepe was a regionally important site, attracting Buddhist scholars from along the Silk Road, as is evidenced by pottery finds inscribed with Brahmi, Punjabi, Kharosthi, and Bactrian scripts. The Buddhist frescoes excavated here are now on display in the State Museum of History of Uzbekistan in Tashkent.
- The Zurmala Stupa is one of the oldest surviving buildings in Uzbekistan, dating from the 1st to 2nd centuries AD. Its brick structure is 16m high and is the only remaining part of a vast Buddhist stupa which would have been originally clad in stone and richly decorated.
- Kampir Tepe was a substantial city built on the Amu Darya river by Alexander the Great. Known as Alexandria on the Oxus, the city had an important harbour with a lighthouse, as well as a citadel, temples, and a gateway that is a replica of one found in Pamphylia in Turkey. The site is still being excavated by archeologists but is open to the public.
- Termizi Memorial Complex, Hakim Termezi Mausoleum, is a historical site in Termez (9th-15th centuries). Al-Hakim al-Termezi Mausoleum, considered sacred for Muslims, is situated in the ancient part of Termez. It houses the tomb of Abu Abdullah Muhammad Hakim Termezi, a prominent Islamic scholar, author of various philosophical and religious works, and the founder of a group of dervishes. The complex is associated with Abu Abdullah Muhammad Hakim Termezi (approximately 750-760 Termez - 869).
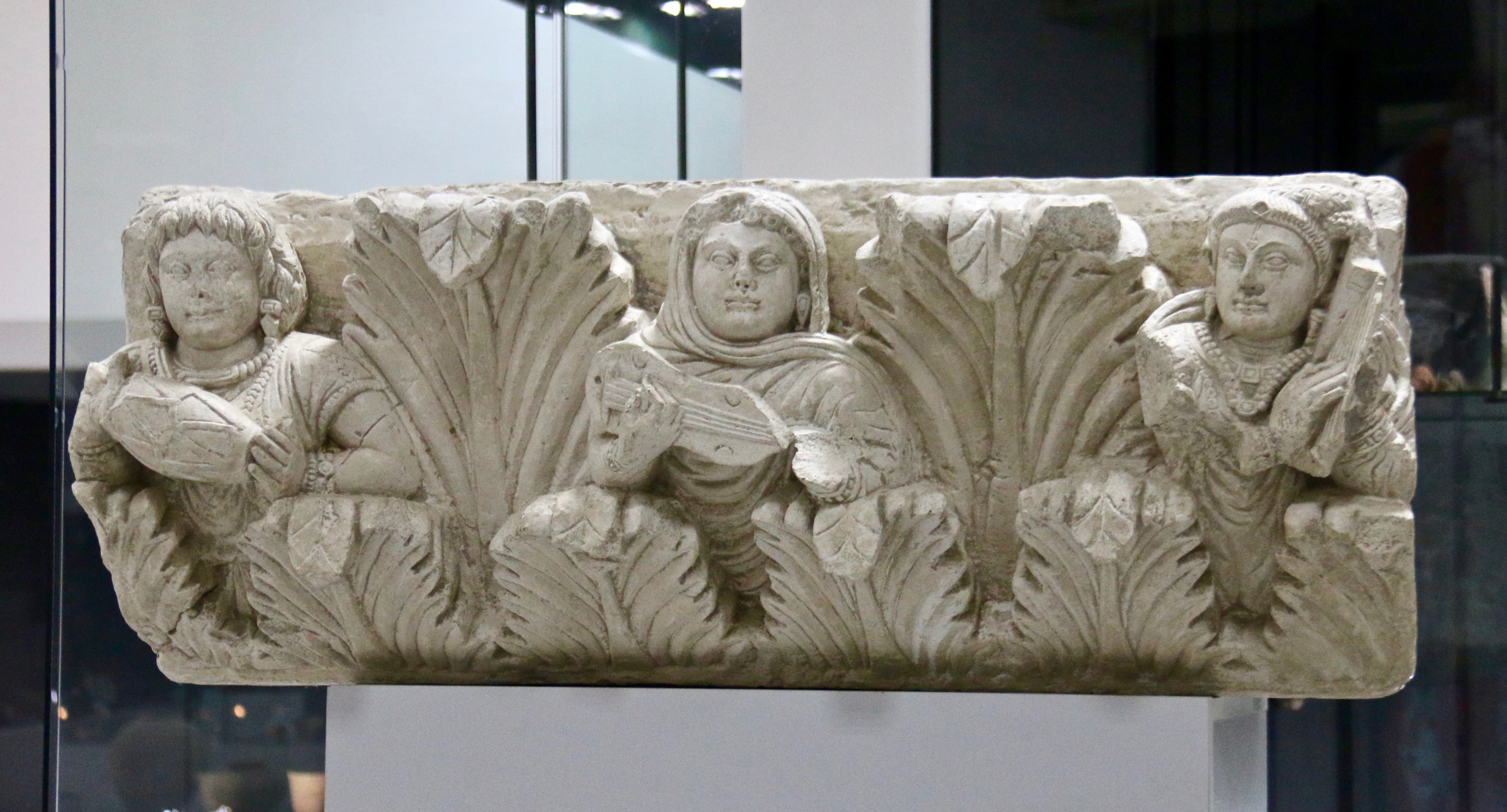
Greco-Buddhist Airtam Frieze showing musicians, in the style of Gandhara.

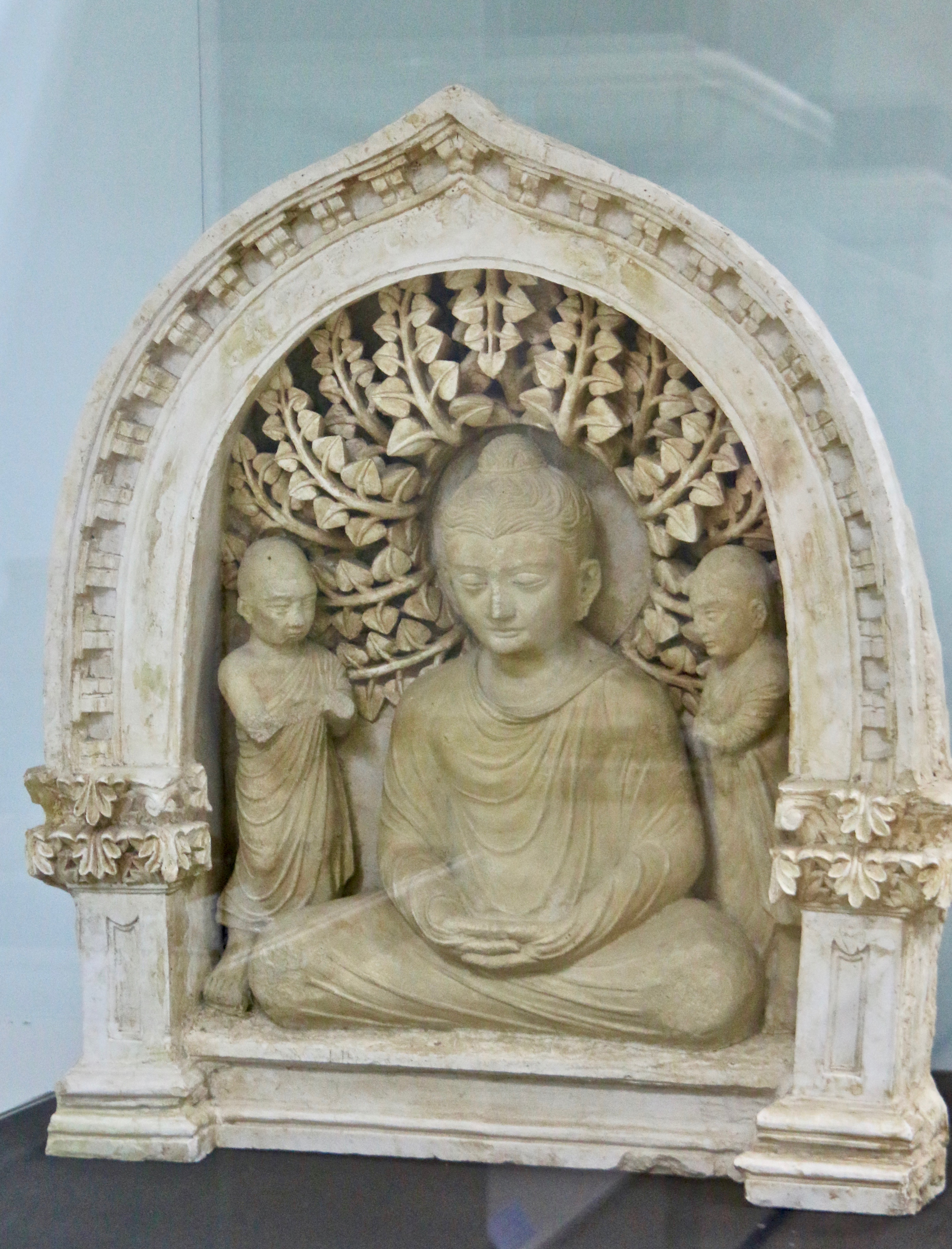
The Buddha and attendants (original in the State Museum of History of Uzbekistan, Tashkent).

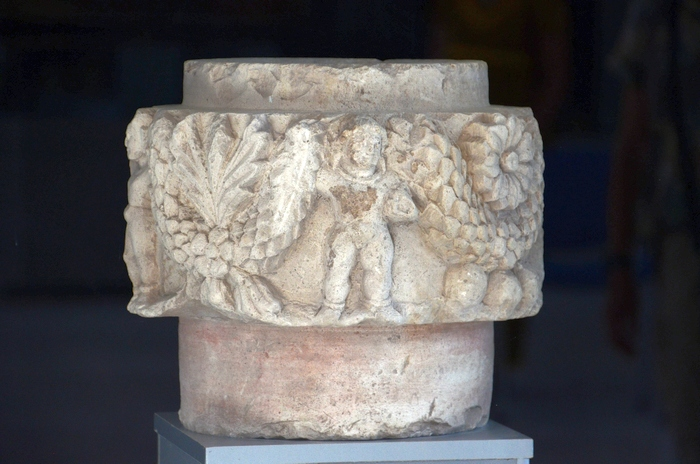
Capital with Classical Garland bearers, 100-200 CE.

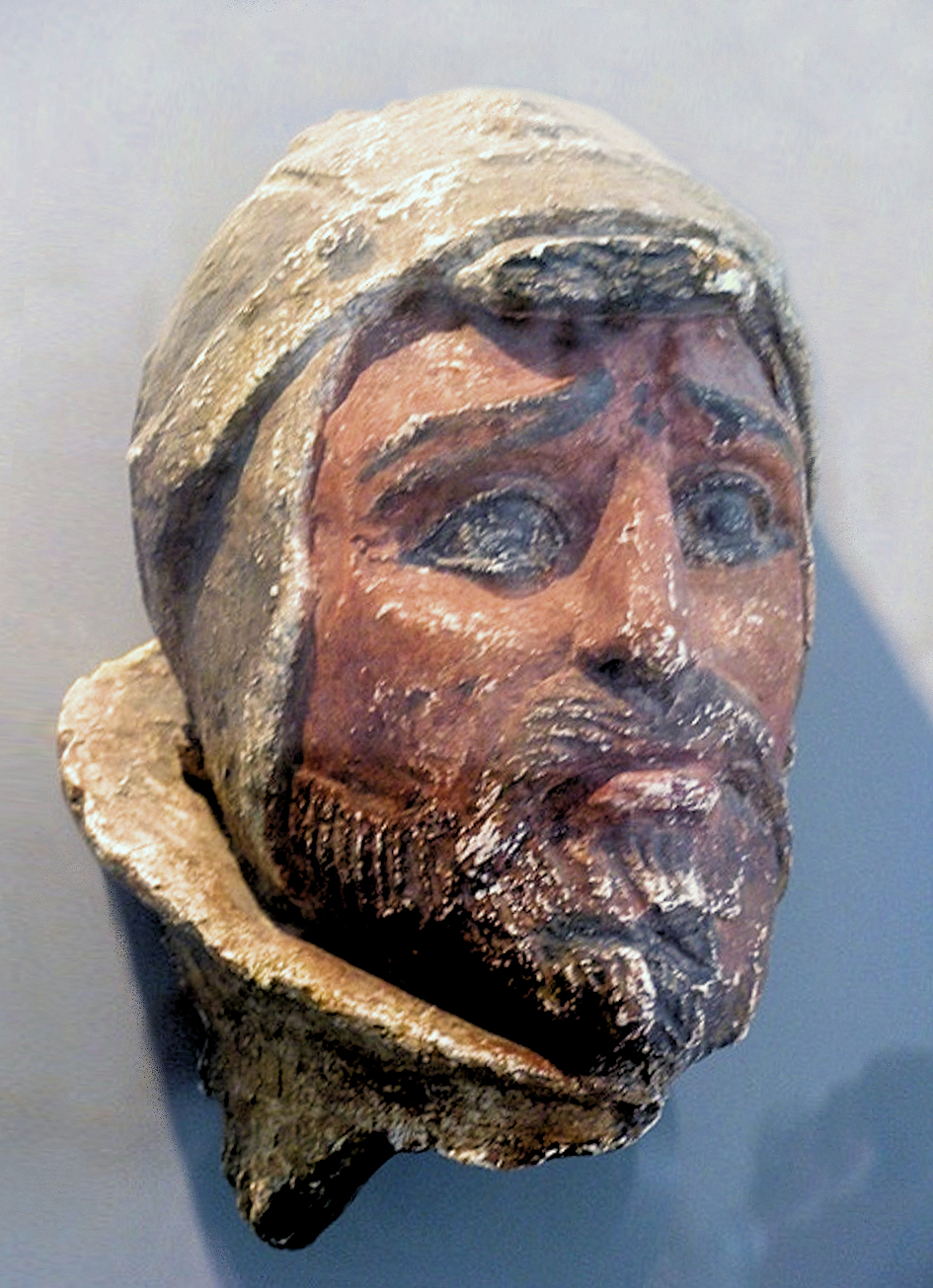
Saka warrior from the site of Khalchayan. Art of the Yuezhi.

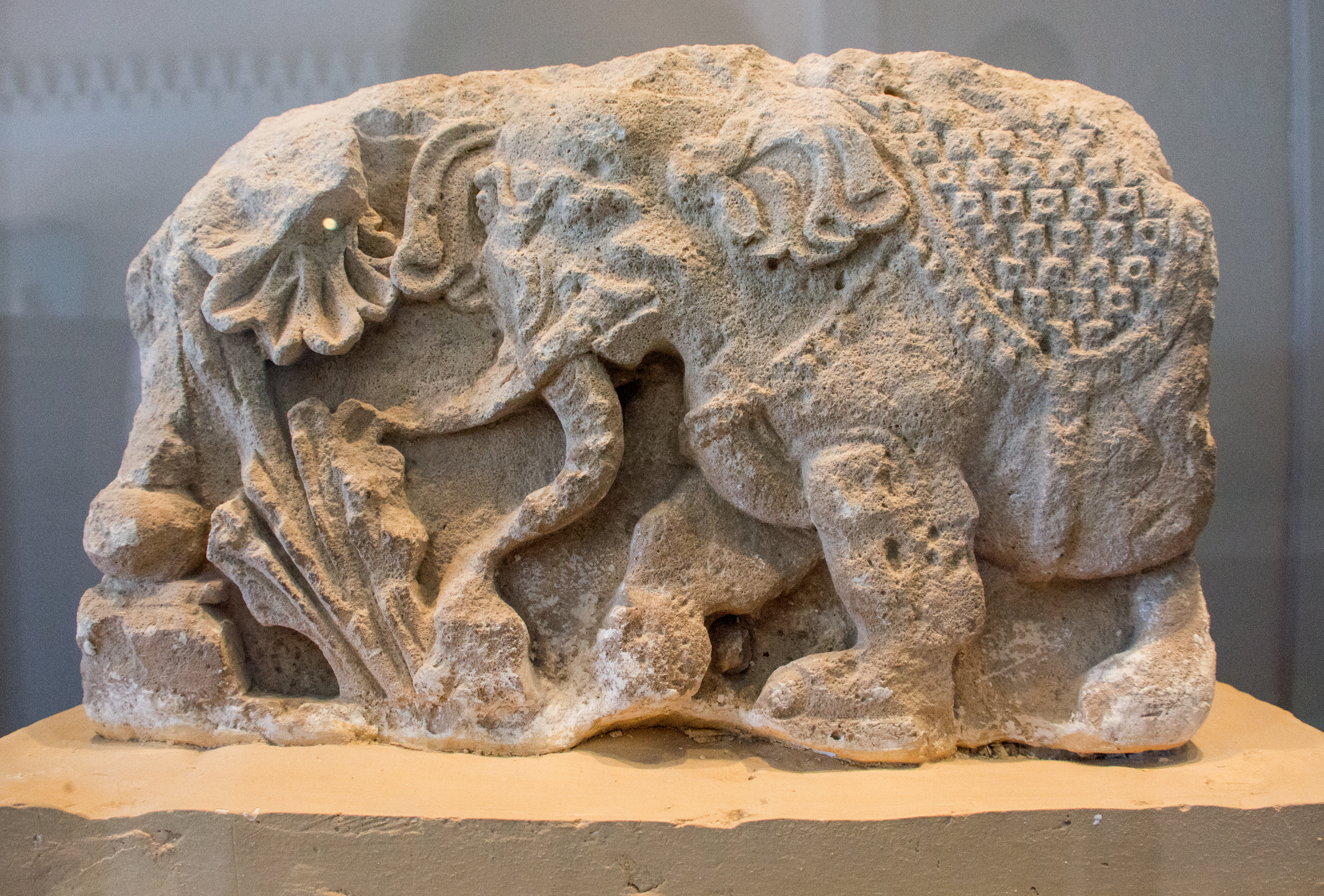
Elephant among Lotus Flowers, Old Termez, 2nd–3rd cent CE.

== Notable people ==
- Its most famous native son is Al-Tirmidhi, born in its suburb Bugh and buried 60 kilometers north of Termez, on the outskirts of Sherobod, Uzbekistan. He is one of the six canonical hadith collectors of Sunni Islam. He is locally known as Abu Isa at Termezi.
- Hakim-at-Termizi, one of the famous Sufi theologians, is buried in old Termez which is in the suburbs of modern Termez. He is also known as Termez Ota (a patron saint of Termez).
- Sayyid Ali Akbar was an Islamic saint, the son of the eleventh Shia Imam, Hasan al-Askari and the brother of the twelfth Imam, Muhammad al-Mahdi. Sayyid Ali Akbar is Sultan Saadat (Sodot) who died in Termez. His burial place is located in the main mausoleum Sultan Saodat memorial complex in Termez.
- Adib Sabir, 12th-century Persian poet
- Said Baraka was from old Termez. He was a philosopher, war strategist and religious nobleman, and Amir Temur's teacher.
- Ali Termezi known as "Pir Baba" was a Sayyid born in Termez, (1502–1583 CE). His mausoleum is in a village named Pir Baba after him in Buner District of Khyber Pakhtunkhwa, Pakistan.
- Valery Khalilov (1952–2016) was born in Termez. He was a Russian general and a composer.
- Serhii Prokazin (1975–2023), Ukrainian military pilot, posthumously awarded with the title Hero of Ukraine

== See also ==
- List of cities in Uzbekistan
- List of cities founded by Alexander the Great
