= Margha =

Margha مرغا
- Village
- Location within Iran
- Coordinates: 31°42′41″N 50°10′17″E
- Country: Iran
- Province: Khuzestan
- County: Izeh
- Bakhsh: Dehdez
- Rural District: Dehdez

Population (2006)
  - Total: 23
- Time zone: UTC+3:30 (IRST)
  - Summer (DST): UTC+4:30 (IRDT)

Margha (Persian: مرغا, also Romanized as Marghā; also known as Morghāb) is a village in Dehdez Rural District, Dehdez District, Izeh County, Khuzestan Province, Iran. At the 2006 census, its population was 23, in 5 families.
