= Mond River =

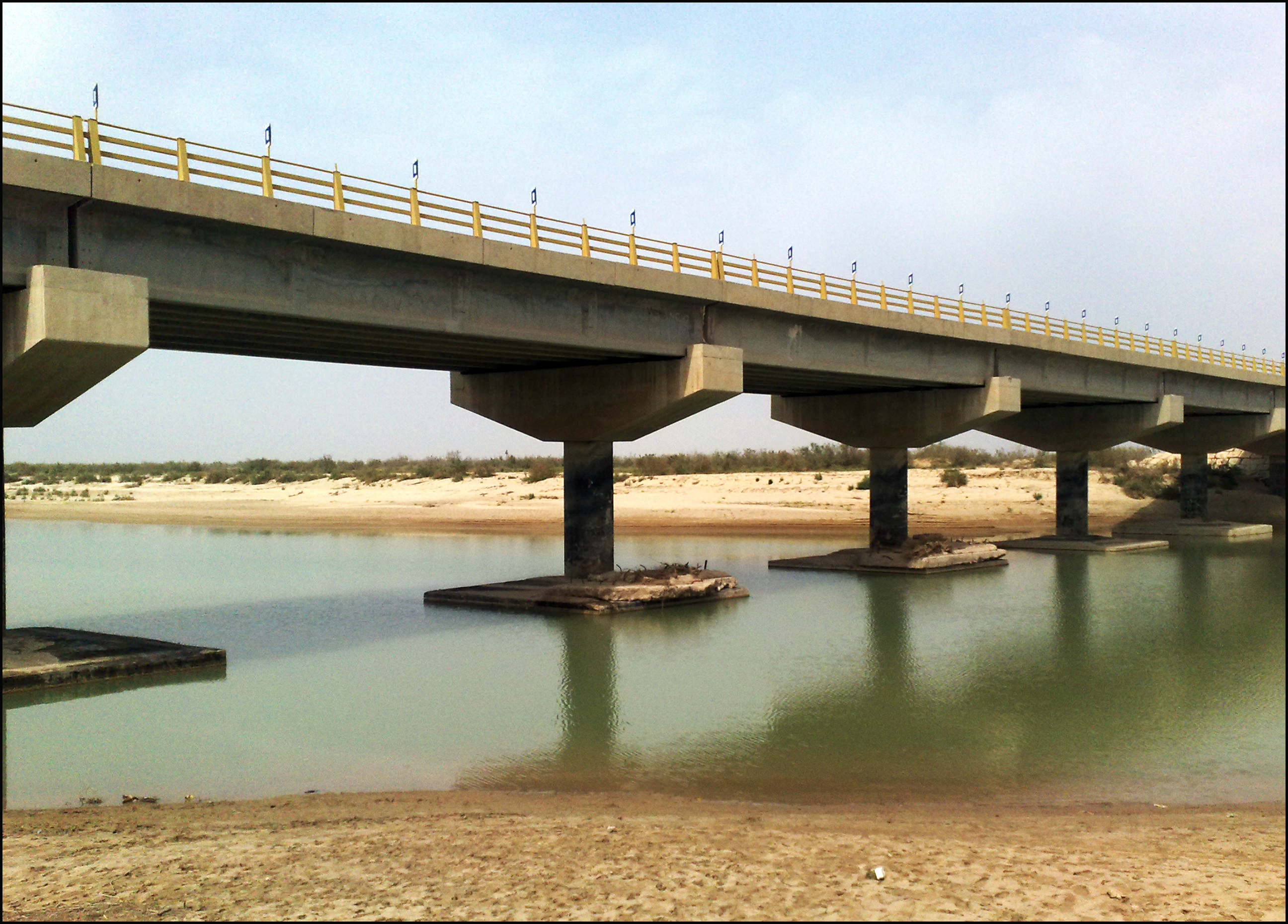
- Native name: رودخانه مند (Persian)

Physical characteristics
- Source
  - location: Fars province, west of Shiraz
  - coordinates: 29°49′28″N 51°51′38″E
- Mouth
  - location: Persian Gulf, in Bushehr province
  - coordinates: 28°8′16″N 51°16′11″E

The Mond River (Persian: رودخانه مند), also known in English as the Mand River, runs through Fars province and Bushehr province in south-western Iran, flowing to the Persian Gulf.

== See also ==
- Mond protected area
