= Hakim at-Termizi Mausoleum =

Mausoleum in Uzbekistan

Hakim at-Termizi mausoleum
- Termiziy maqbarasi
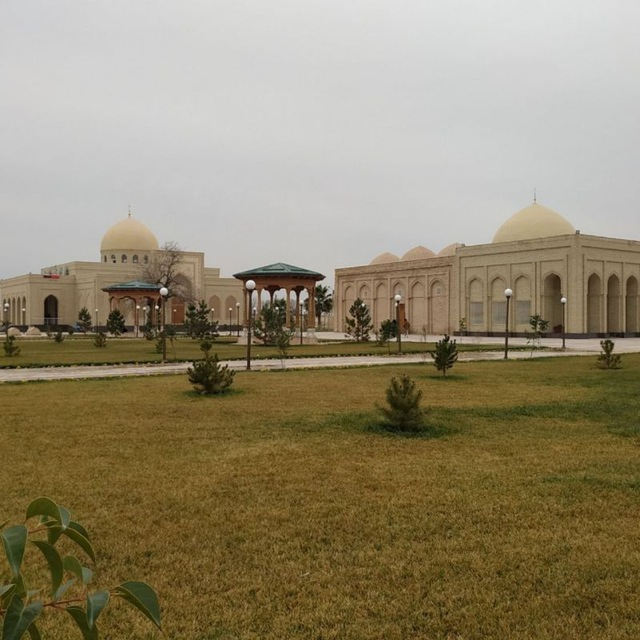
- The mausoleum of Hakim at-Termizi in Surxondaryo Region, Uzbekistan
- Interactive map of Hakim at-Termizi mausoleum
- Location: Surxondaryo Region, Uzbekistan
- Coordinates: 37.67575°N 67.07931°E
- Type: Mausoleum
- Material: Brick, marble, stucco, terracotta
- Beginning date: 11th century
- Completion date: 15th century
- Restored date: 1980-1981, 2001-2002
- Dedicated to: Hakim at-Termizi, an Islamic scholar and founder of the Hakimiyya order of dervishes

The Hakim at-Termizi Mausoleum (Uzbek: Hakim at-Termiziy maqbarasi; other names: Termizi Mausoleum) is a historical funerary monument located in the Sherobod district of Surxondaryo Region, Uzbekistan. It serves as a memorial to Islamic scholar Al-Hakim at-Termizi. The mausoleum was constructed on top of his grave.

== History ==
The At-Termizi Mausoleum is a part of the Hakim at-Termizi complex. In addition to the mausoleum, the complex includes a mosque, guesthouse, and cells for pilgrims. Over the years, this complex has undergone several renovations.

On the eastern side of the mausoleum, a guesthouse was built in a distinctive architectural style. Additionally, near the mausoleum, Hakim at-Termizi's son, al-Hakim Abdullokh, had his mausoleum erected in the 10th century. Furthermore, during the 11th and 12th centuries, a three-dome mosque for prayer was also constructed.

During the Timurid dynasty (15th century), the guesthouse was expanded to a height of half a meter, and its cells were refurbished. The adjoining cells were also restored. The mihrab, located in the western part of the mosque, was constructed during this era.

Significant restoration work was carried out during the rule of Abdullakhan in the late 16th century (1583-1598). A new mosque with eight domes was built within the complex. Additionally, an entrance porch was added. Another small mausoleum and a pilgrimage area were created at the southern entrance. This further connected the mausoleum with the guesthouse.

== Architecture ==
The mausoleum consists of a roughly square-shaped building with four chambers (rooms) interconnected through passageways, with approximate dimensions of 4.3 by 4.5 meters. The construction features an eastern-style entrance on the northeastern side, added at a later stage. One of the three rooms within this structure has a square layout and contains a marble cenotaph. This cenotaph is elaborately adorned with stucco designs, including inscriptions. An entrance from the cenotaph leads to the guesthouse. The guesthouse chambers, relatively smaller in size than the courtyard, are separated by a spacious aisle. The guesthouse is equipped with a dome and mihrab. Two rooms open towards the northeastern side in the style of northern and eastern architecture. On the outside of the guesthouse, three gumbads surmount the structure, featuring square shapes and ornate squinches. The exteriors are adorned with stucco and six-ribbed muqarnas decorations. The rectangular windows on the external walls are covered by ornate wooden latticework and bear decorative carvings. The mausoleum is richly decorated with terracotta friezes, intricate floral designs, and six rows of rectangular windows. These windows have ornate tracery, and the window frames are enhanced with carved details. The outer walls are adorned with stucco, displaying six-ribbed muqarnas and various inscriptions. The balconies are decorated with stucco designs. The exterior walls are fortified with six decorative panels, while the windows are adorned with stucco and intricate tracery. The mausoleum's primary architectural feature is a small kiosk-style gumbad on the roof.

== Academic research ==
The first-ever scholarly examination of the mausoleum was undertaken by D. N. Logofet, and the findings were published in road sketches. In 1945, V. L. Voronina conducted comprehensive measurements of the building.

Scientific investigations were carried out at the Hakim at-Termizi Mausoleum between 1955 and 1957. As a result, the mausoleum's state, typical of the 14th and 15th centuries, was reevaluated and restored.

== Restoration ==
The mausoleum underwent restoration work in the years 1980-1981. Subsequently, in from 2001 to 2002, both the mausoleum and the guesthouse sections were fully refurbished. The marble cenotaph from the mausoleum was relocated to the Museum of Termez, and in its place, a modern replica, created by contemporary craftsmen, was installed.

In honor of the 660th anniversary of the birth of Amir Temur, restoration work was carried out at the at-Termizi Mausoleum. Its cenotaph and decorative lattice windows were reinstalled.
