= Morghab, Iran =

Morghab مرغاب
- village
- Location within Iran
- Coordinates: 29°24′36″N 56°36′00″E
- Country: Iran
- Province: Kerman
- County: Baft
- Bakhsh: Central
- Rural District: Kiskan

Population (2006)
  - Total: 15
- Time zone: UTC+3:30 (IRST)
  - Summer (DST): UTC+4:30 (IRDT)
- ISO 3166 code: IRN

Morghab (Persian: مرغاب, also Romanized as Morghāb) is a village in Kiskan Rural District, in the Central District of Baft County, Kerman Province, Iran. At the 2006 census, its population was 15, in 6 families.
