= Buddhism in Central Asia =

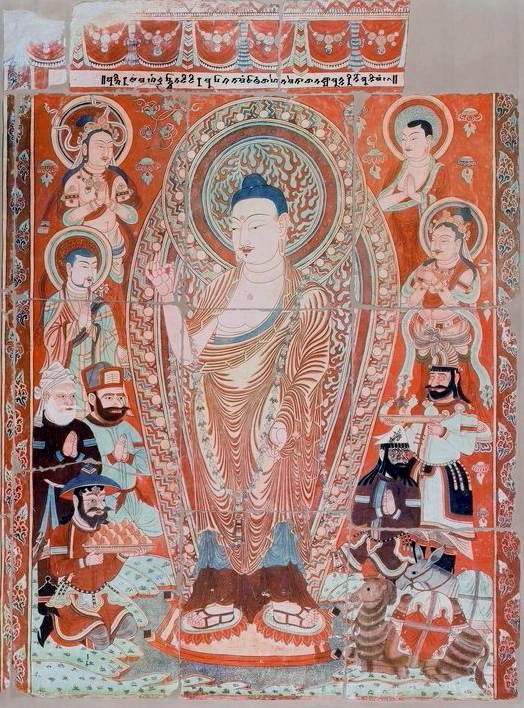
Pranidhi scene, temple 9 (Cave 20). Bezeklik Thousand Buddha Caves

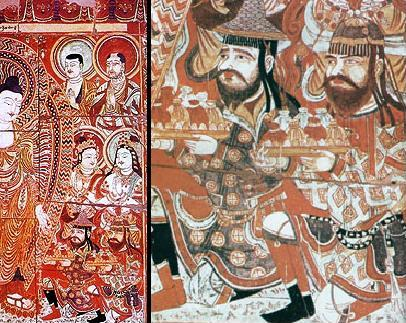
Sogdian merchant donors giving to the Buddha. Bezeklik Thousand Buddha Caves

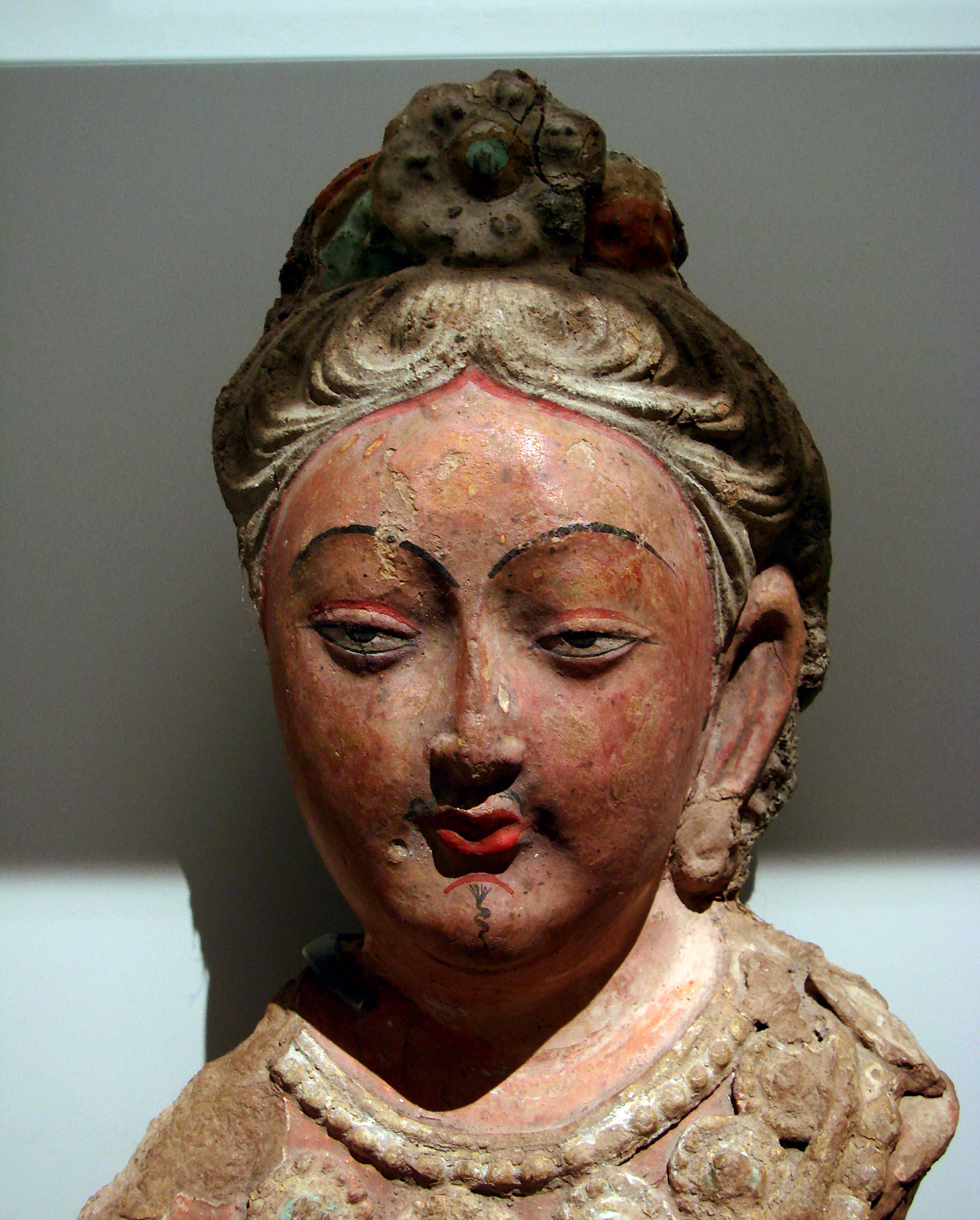
Bust of a bodhisattva from Kucha, 6th-7th century. Musée Guimet.

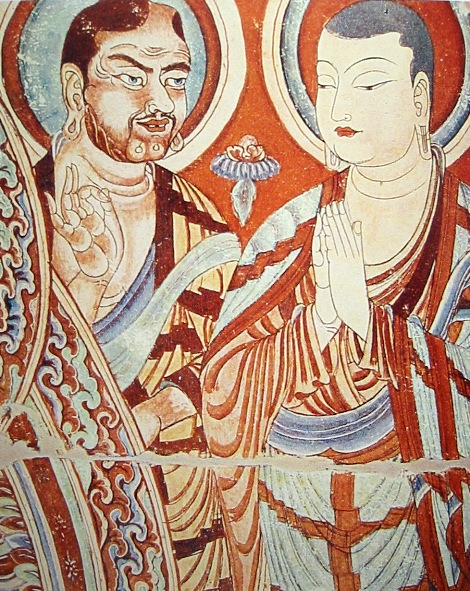
Blue-eyed Central Asian monk teaching East-Asian monk, Bezeklik, Turfan, eastern Tarim Basin, China, 9th century; the monk on the left is possibly Tocharian, although more likely Sogdian.

Buddhism in Central Asia mainly existed in Mahayana forms and was historically especially prevalent along the Silk Road. The history of Buddhism in Central Asia is closely related to the Silk Road transmission of Buddhism during the first millennium of the common era. Buddhism dominated in Pre-Islamic Central Asia. It has been argued that the spread of Indian culture and religions, especially Buddhism, as far as Sogdia, corresponded to the rule of the Kidarites over the regions from Sogdia to Gandhara.

Buddhism has now been largely replaced by Islam in modern Central Asia. Uzbekistan and Kazakhstan have the most Buddhists, largely practiced by their Koryo-saram minority, although the former has the lowest percentage of Buddhists. Due to historical Tibetan, Mongol and Manchurian influence, Kyrgyzstan has the highest percentage of Buddhists in Central Asia.

== History ==
=== Buddhist monastic groups ===
A number of Early Buddhist schools were historically prevalent throughout Central Asia. A number of scholars identify three distinct major phases of missionary activities seen in the history of Buddhism in Central Asia, which are associated with the following sects (chronologically):

1. Dharmaguptaka
2. Sarvāstivāda
3. Mūlasarvāstivāda

The Dharmaguptaka made more efforts than any other sect to spread Buddhism outside India, to areas such as Afghanistan, Central Asia, and China, and they had great success in doing so. Therefore, most countries which adopted Buddhism from China, also adopted the Dharmaguptaka vinaya and ordination lineage for bhikṣus and bhikṣuṇīs. According to A.K. Warder, in some ways in those East Asian countries, the Dharmaguptaka sect can be considered to have survived to the present. Warder further writes:

It was the Dharmaguptakas who were the first Buddhists to establish themselves in Central Asia. They appear to have carried out a vast circling movement along the trade routes from Aparānta north-west into Iran and at the same time into Oḍḍiyāna (the Suvastu valley, north of Gandhāra, which became one of their main centres). After establishing themselves as far west as Parthia they followed the "silk route", the east-west axis of Asia, eastwards across Central Asia and on into China, where they effectively established Buddhism in the second and third centuries A.D. The Mahīśāsakas and Kāśyapīyas appear to have followed them across Asia into China. [...] For the earlier period of Chinese Buddhism it was the Dharmaguptakas who constituted the main and most influential school, and even later their Vinaya remained the basis of the discipline there.

In the 7th century CE, Yijing grouped the Mahīśāsaka, Dharmaguptaka, and Kāśyapīya together as sub-sects of the Sarvāstivāda, and stated that these three were not prevalent in the "five parts of India," but were located in some parts of Oḍḍiyāna, Khotan, and Kucha.

=== Greco-Buddhism ===
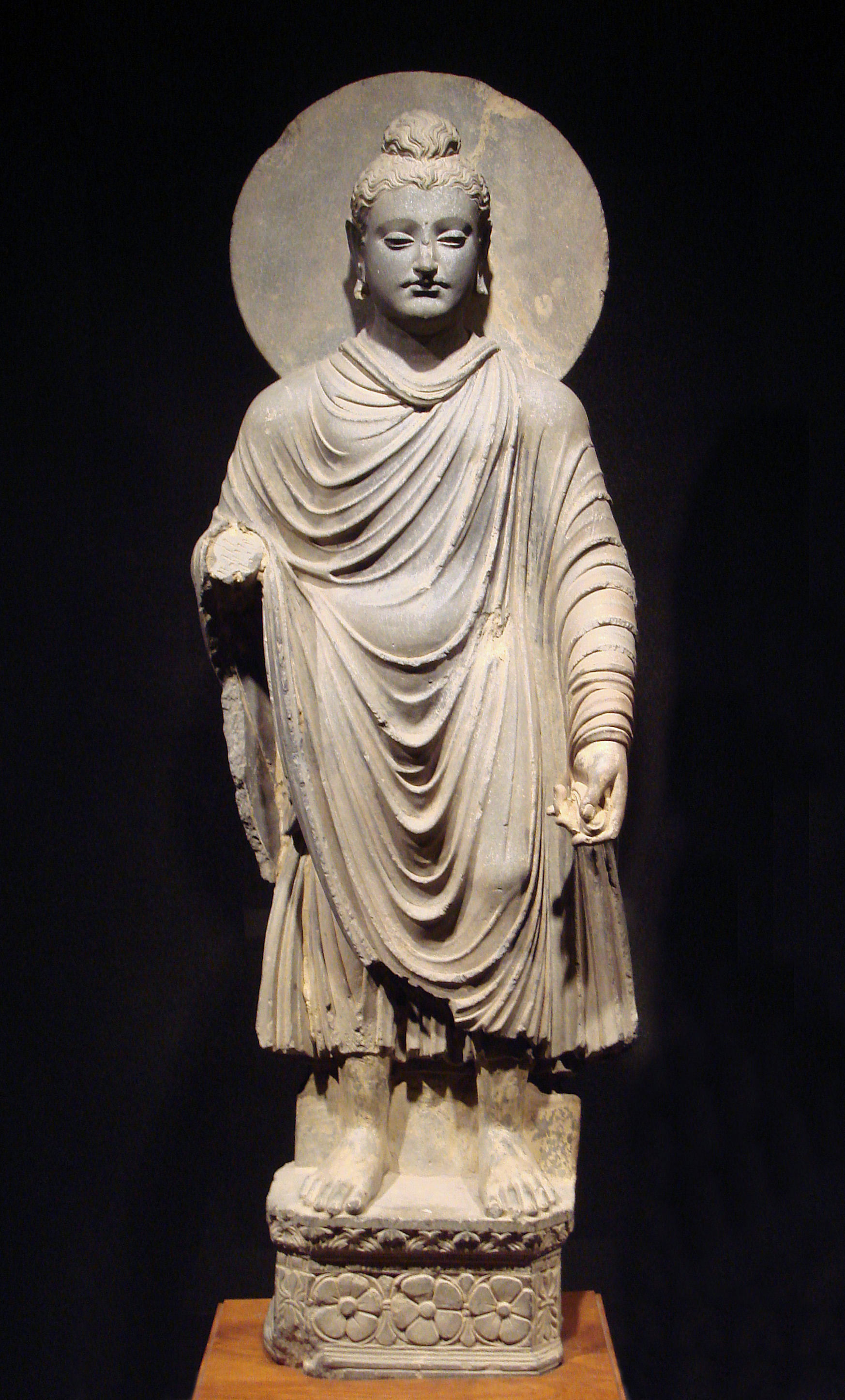
One of the first representations of the Buddha, 1st-2nd century AD, Gandhara: Standing Buddha (Tokyo National Museum).

Buddhism in Central Asia began with the syncretism between Western Classical Greek philosophy and Indian Buddhism in the Hellenistic successor kingdoms to Alexander the Great's empire (Greco-Bactrian Kingdom 250 BCE-125 BCE and Indo-Greek Kingdom 180 BCE - 10 CE), spanning modern Afghanistan, Uzbekistan, and Tajikistan. See Greco-Buddhism and Dayuan (Ta-yuan; Chinese: 大宛; literarily "Great Ionians"). The later Kushan empire would adopt the Greek alphabet (Bactrian language), Greco-Buddhist art forms and coinage, and Greco-Buddhist religion of these Hellenistic kingdoms.

The first anthropomorphic representations of the Buddha himself are often considered a result of the Greco-Buddhist interaction. Before this innovation, Buddhist art was "aniconic": the Buddha was only represented through his symbols (an empty throne, the Bodhi tree, the Buddha's footprints, the Dharma wheel). This reluctance towards anthropomorphic representations of the Buddha, and the sophisticated development of aniconic symbols to avoid it (even in narrative scenes where other human figures would appear), seem to be connected to one of the Buddha's sayings, reported in the Digha Nikaya, that discouraged representations of himself after the extinction of his body.

Probably not feeling bound by these restrictions, and because of "their cult of form, the Greeks were the first to attempt a sculptural representation of the Buddha". In many parts of the Ancient World, the Greeks did develop syncretic divinities, that could become a common religious focus for populations with different traditions: a well-known example is the syncretic God Sarapis, introduced by Ptolemy I in Egypt, which combined aspects of Greek and Egyptian Gods. In India as well, it was only natural for the Greeks to create a single common divinity by combining the image of a Greek God-King (The Sun-God Apollo, or possibly the deified founder of the Indo-Greek Kingdom, Demetrius), with the traditional attributes of the Buddha.

Many of the stylistic elements in these first representations of the Buddha point to Greek influence: the Greek himation (a light toga-like wavy robe covering both shoulders), the halo, the contrapposto stance of the upright figures (see: 1st–2nd century Gandhara standing Buddhas and), the stylized Mediterranean curly hair and top-knot apparently derived from the style of the Belvedere Apollo (330 BCE), and the measured quality of the faces, all rendered with strong artistic realism (See: Greek art). Some of the standing Buddhas (as the one pictured) were sculpted using the specific Greek technique of making the hands and sometimes the feet in marble to increase the realistic effect, and the rest of the body in another material. Foucher especially considered Hellenistic free-standing Buddhas as "the most beautiful, and probably the most ancient of the Buddhas", assigning them to the 1st century BCE, and making them the starting point of the anthropomorphic representations of the Buddha ("The Buddhist art of Gandhara", Marshall, p101).

=== Kushan Empire ===
At the beginning of the Kushan dynasty (c. 30 AD), various religious systems were widespread in Central Asia. These included the cult of Anahit (originating in Armenia); Zoroastrianism, including the cults of Mithra/Mitra, Ormuzd, Verethragna and (especially in Khorezm and Sogd) Siyâvash; as well as the Greek pantheon, including Zeus, and Helios.

According to Chinese chronicles, Buddhism arrived in China in 147 from the Kushans (who were known in China by an older, Chinese exonym: the Great Yuezhi) and the work of Kushan missionaries resulted in Buddhism being adopted as the official religion of the court of the Chinese emperor, Emperor Huan of Han (reigned 146–168).

In the middle of the 2nd century, the Kushan empire under Kanishka I expanded into Central Asia and went as far as taking control of Kashgar, Khotan and Yarkand, in the Tarim Basin, modern Xinjiang. As a consequence, cultural exchanges greatly increased, and Central Asian Buddhist missionaries became active shortly after in the Chinese capital cities of Luoyang and sometimes Nanjing, where they particularly distinguished themselves by their translation work. They promoted both Hīnayāna and Mahāyāna scriptures.

The followers of Buddhism had been banished from Iran in the 2nd and 3rd centuries and found support in Central Asia, where Buddhism became widely practiced.

During modern archeological excavations in Khorezm (including Bazaar-Kala, Gyaur-Kala, Gyaz-Kala), Sogd (Tali-barzu, Zohak-i-Maron, Er-Kurgan and others) and Old Termez it was found that many settlements and forts dated back to the Kushan period. However, the largest number of traces of Buddhist culture during the Kushan period were found in Takhar previously Tukhara or Tokharistan, in modern Afghanistan.

=== Khotan ===
The ancient Kingdom of Khotan was one of the earliest Buddhist states in the world and a cultural bridge across which Buddhist culture and learning were transmitted from India to China. Its capital was located to the west of the modern city of Hotan. The inhabitants of the Kingdom of Khotan, like those of early Kashgar and Yarkand, spoke the Iranian Saka language.

Available evidence indicates that the first Buddhist missions to Khotan were carried out by the Dharmaguptaka sect:

... the Khotan Dharmapada, some orthographical devices of Khotanese and the not yet systematically plotted Gāndhārī loan words in Khotanese betray indisputably that the first missions in Khotan included Dharmaguptakas and used a Kharoṣṭhī-written Gāndhārī. Now all other manuscripts from Khotan, and especially all manuscripts written in Khotanese, belong to the Mahāyāna, are written in the Brāhmī script, and were translated from Sanskrit.

By the 3rd century CE, it appears that some Mahāyāna texts were known in Khotan, as reported by the Chinese monk Zhu Shixing 朱士行 (d. after 282):

When in 260 AD, the Chinese monk Zhu Shixing chose to go to Khotan in an attempt to find original Sanskrit sūtras, he succeeded in locating the Sanskrit Prajñāpāramitā in 25,000 verses, and tried to send it to China. In Khotan, however, there were numerous Hīnayānists who attempted to prevent it because they regarded the text as heterodox. Eventually, Zhu Shixing stayed in Khotan, but sent the manuscript to Luoyang where it was translated by a Khotanese monk named Mokṣala. In 296, the Khotanese monk Gītamitra came to Chang'an with another copy of the same text.

When the Chinese monk Faxian traveled through Khotan, he recorded that everyone there was Buddhist. According to his accounts, there were fourteen main monasteries, and he stayed at the most important of these, the monastery of Gomatī, which housed 3000 Mahāyāna monks. When Xuanzang was later traveling through Khotan in the 7th century, he wrote that the king came out to personally greet him at the border of Khotan. He was escorted to the capital, and lodged at a monastery of the Sarvāstivāda sect. Xuanzang records there being about 100 monasteries in Khotan, housing a total of 5000 monastics who all studied the Mahāyāna.

A manuscript in Tibetan called The Religious Annals of Khotan was found at Dunhuang, and may date to sometime in the 8th century CE. It describes the initial appearance of Buddhism in Khotan, including the eight major tutelary deities of Khotan, the "self-originated bodhisattvas" of the country, and a description of the major principles of the Śrāvakayāna and the Mahāyāna, though the Mahāyāna is given preeminence. The śrāvakas are depicted as entering the Dharma through the Four Noble Truths, while the Mahāyāna bodhisattvas are depicted as entering through non-conceptualization and the Śūraṅgama Samādhi.

After the Tang dynasty, Khotan formed an alliance with the rulers of Dunhuang. Khotan enjoyed close relations with the Buddhist center at Dunhuang: the Khotanese royal family intermarried with Dunhuang élites, visited and patronized Dunhuang's Buddhist temple complex, and donated money to have their portraits painted on the walls of the Mogao grottoes. Through the 10th century, Khotanese royal portraits were painted in association with an increasing number of deities in the caves.

Khotan's indigenous dynasty (all of whose royal names are Indian in origin) governed a fervently Buddhist city-state boasting some 400 temples in the late 9th / early 10th century—four times the number recorded by Xuanzang around the year 630 CE. The Buddhist kingdom was independent but was intermittently under Chinese control during the Han and Tang dynasty.

=== Shanshan ===
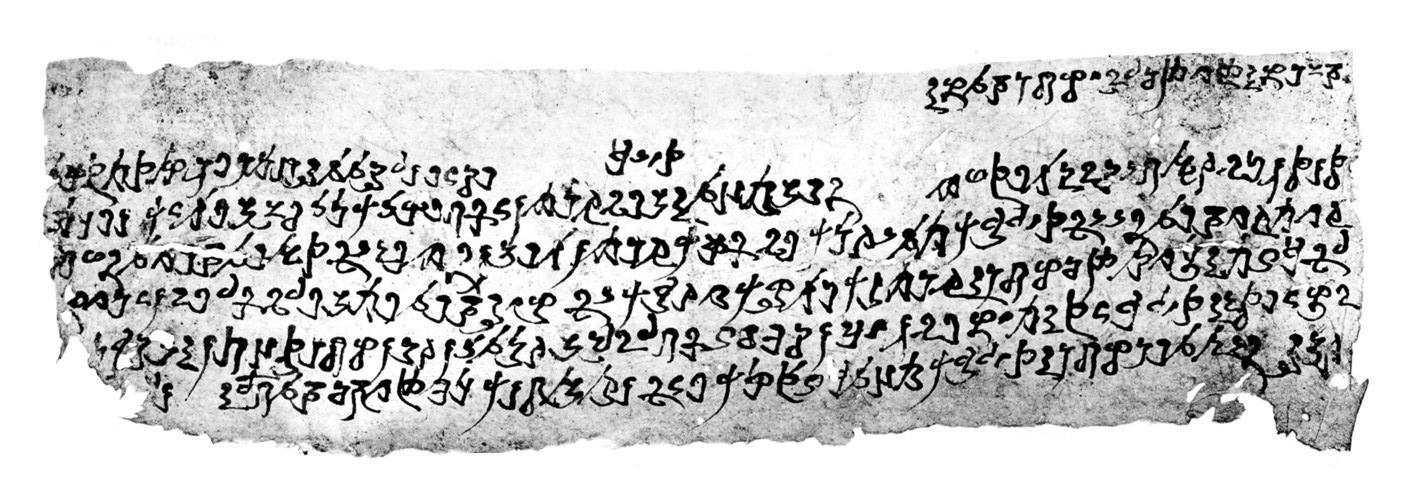
Kharoṣṭhī manuscript from Shanshan

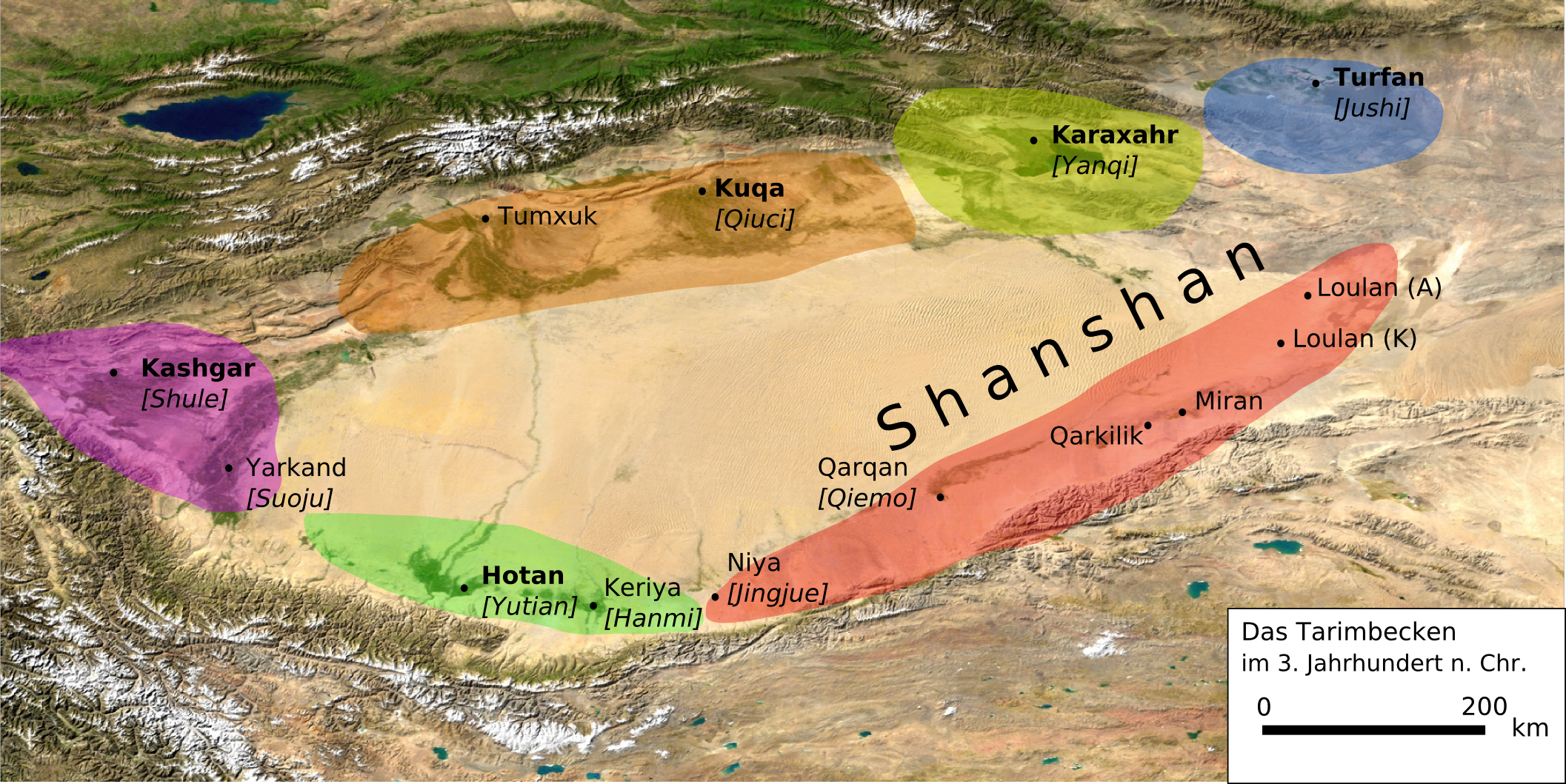
The Tarim Basin in the 3rd century

Buddhism was known to be prevalent in the kingdom of Shanshan. An inscription in the Kharoṣṭhī script was found at Endere, originally written around in the middle of the 3rd century CE. The inscription describes the king of Shanshan as a follower of Mahāyāna Buddhism — one who has "set forth in the Great Vehicle." The king who this refers to was probably Aṃgoka, who was the most powerful king of Shanshan. According to Richard Salomon, there is every reason to believe that Mahāyāna Buddhism was prominent in Shanshan at this time and enjoyed royal patronage.

More evidence of official adoption of Mahāyāna Buddhism in Shanshan is seen in a letter inscribed in wood which dates to several decades later. The letter describes the Great Cozbo Ṣamasena as one who is, "beloved of men and gods, honoured by men and gods, blessed with a good name, who has set forth in the Mahāyāna."

=== Iranian Buddhism ===
Parts of the Buddhist Indo-Greek Kingdom (180 BC - 10AD) and its successor, the Buddhist Kushan Empire (30AD - 375AD), in particular Balkh, were and still remain, Iranic speaking. The famous Buddhist monastery in Balkh, known as Nava Vihara ("New Monastery"), functioned as the center of Central Asia Buddhist learning for centuries. Soon after the Sassanian Persian dynasty fell to the Muslims (in 651), Balkh came under Muslim rule (in 663), but the monastery continued to function for at least another century. In 715, after an insurrection in Balkh was crushed by the Abbasid Caliphate, many Persian Buddhist monks fled east along the Silk Road to the Buddhist Kingdom of Khotan, which spoke a related Eastern Iranian language, and onward into China. Abū Rayḥān al-Bīrūnī, an Eastern Iranic scholar and writer in service to the Ghaznavids, reported that around the start of the 10th century, the monasteries in Bactria, including Nava Vihāra, were still functioning and decorated with Buddha frescoes.

Several Iranian Buddhist monks, including An Shigao and Bodhidharma, played key roles in the Silk Road transmission of Buddhism and the introduction of Buddhism in China. An Shigao (Chinese: 安世高) (fl. c. 148-180 CE) was the earliest known translator of Indian Buddhist texts into Chinese. According to legend, he was a prince of Parthia, nicknamed the "Parthian Marquess", who renounced his claim to the royal throne of Parthia in order to serve as a Buddhist missionary monk in China. Bodhidharma, the founder of Chán-Buddhism, which later became Zen and the legendary originator of the physical training of the Shaolin monks that led to the creation of Shaolin Kung Fu, is described as a Buddhist monk of Iranian descent in the first Chinese reference to him (Yan Xuan-Zhi, 547 CE). Throughout Buddhist art, Bodhidharma is depicted as a profusely bearded and wide-eyed barbarian, and he is referred as "The Blue-Eyed Barbarian" (碧眼胡, Bìyǎn hú) in Chinese Chan texts.

Nava Vihara's hereditary administrators, the Iranian Barmakids, converted from Buddhism to Islam after the monastery's conquest and became powerful viziers under the Abbasid caliphs of Baghdad. The last of the family's line of viziers, Ja'far ibn Yahya, is a protagonist in many tales from the Arabian Nights. In folktales and popular culture Ja'far has been associated with a knowledge of mysticism, sorcery, and traditions lying outside the realm of Islam. Such traditions of mysticism and syncretism continued in Balkh, which was the birthplace of the medieval Persian poet Rumi, founder of the Mevlevi Sufi Order.

The many Buddhist references in Persian literature of the period also provide evidence of Islamic–Buddhist cultural contact. Persian poetry often used the simile for palaces that they were "as beautiful as a Nowbahar [Nava Vihāra]." Further, at Nava Vihāra and Bamiyan, Buddha images, particularly of Maitreya, the future Buddha, had 'moon discs' or halo iconographically represented behind or around their heads. This led to the poetic depiction of pure beauty as someone having "the moon-shaped face of a Buddha." Thus, 11th-century Persian poems, such as Varqe and Golshah by Ayyuqi, use the word budh with a positive connotation for "Buddha," not with its second, derogatory meaning as "idol." This positive connotation implies the ideal of asexual beauty in both men and women. Such references indicate that either Buddhist monasteries and images were present in these Iranian cultural areas at least through the early Mongol period in the 13th century or, at minimum, that a Buddhist legacy remained for centuries among the Buddhist converts to Islam.

=== Later history ===
Other religious kings, such as the 16th century Mongol potentate Altan Khan, invited Buddhist teachers to their realm and proclaimed Buddhism as the official creed of the land in order to help unify their people and consolidate their rule. In the process they may have prohibited certain practices of non-Buddhist, indigenous religions and even persecuted those who followed them, but these heavy-handed moves were primarily politically motivated.

Buddhism in Uzbekistan is currently practised by 0.11 per cent of the population. The only functioning Buddhist temple in Uzbekistan is called “Jaeunsa” (“Compassion”), which belong to the Korean Buddhist Jogye Order and is located on the outskirts of Tashkent.

Buddhism in Kazakhstan at present consists of Korean Buddhists, whom embraced Won Buddhism. There are also Buddhists with diverse ethnicity who consider themselves the disciples of Dalai Lama or Lama Namkhai Norbu, and other belonging to the Karma Kagyu school of Tibetan Buddhism.

Buddhism in Kyrgyzstan has only one registered Buddhist community called “Chamsen”, which exists since 1996 and their membership consist of mainly Koreans, Russians and Kyrgyz. There are also practitioners of other Buddhist denominations like Nipponzan Myohoji and Karma Kagyu in the country.

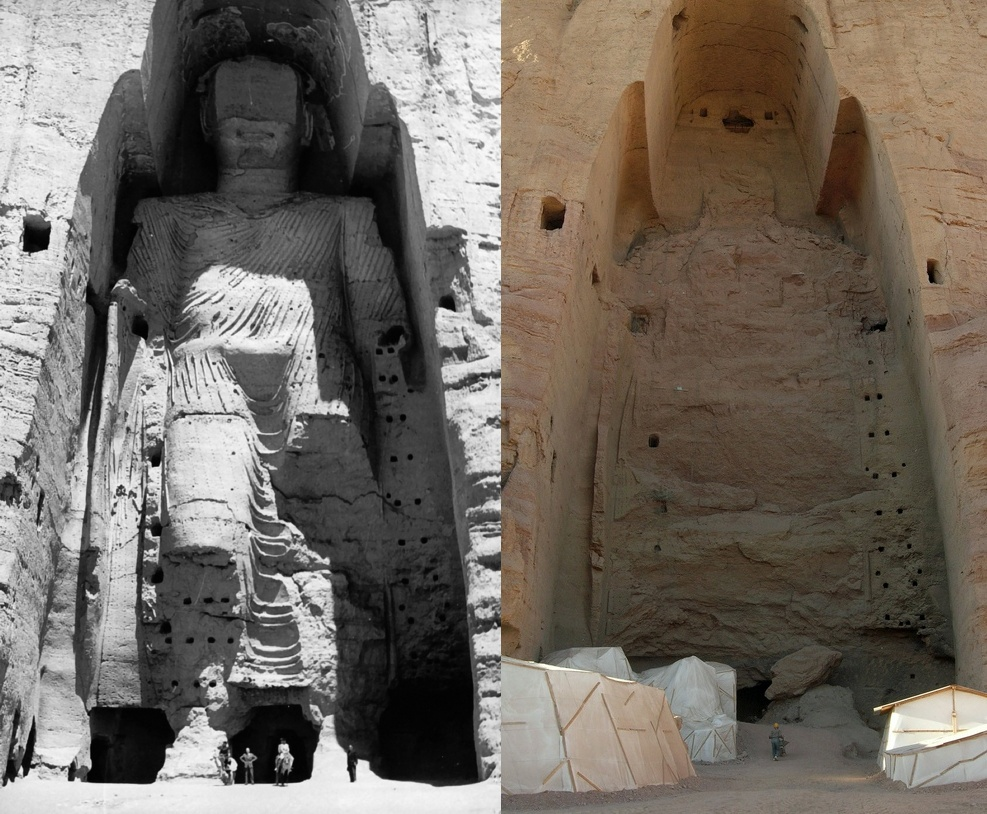
Taller, 55 meter Buddha in 1963 and in 2008 after destruction

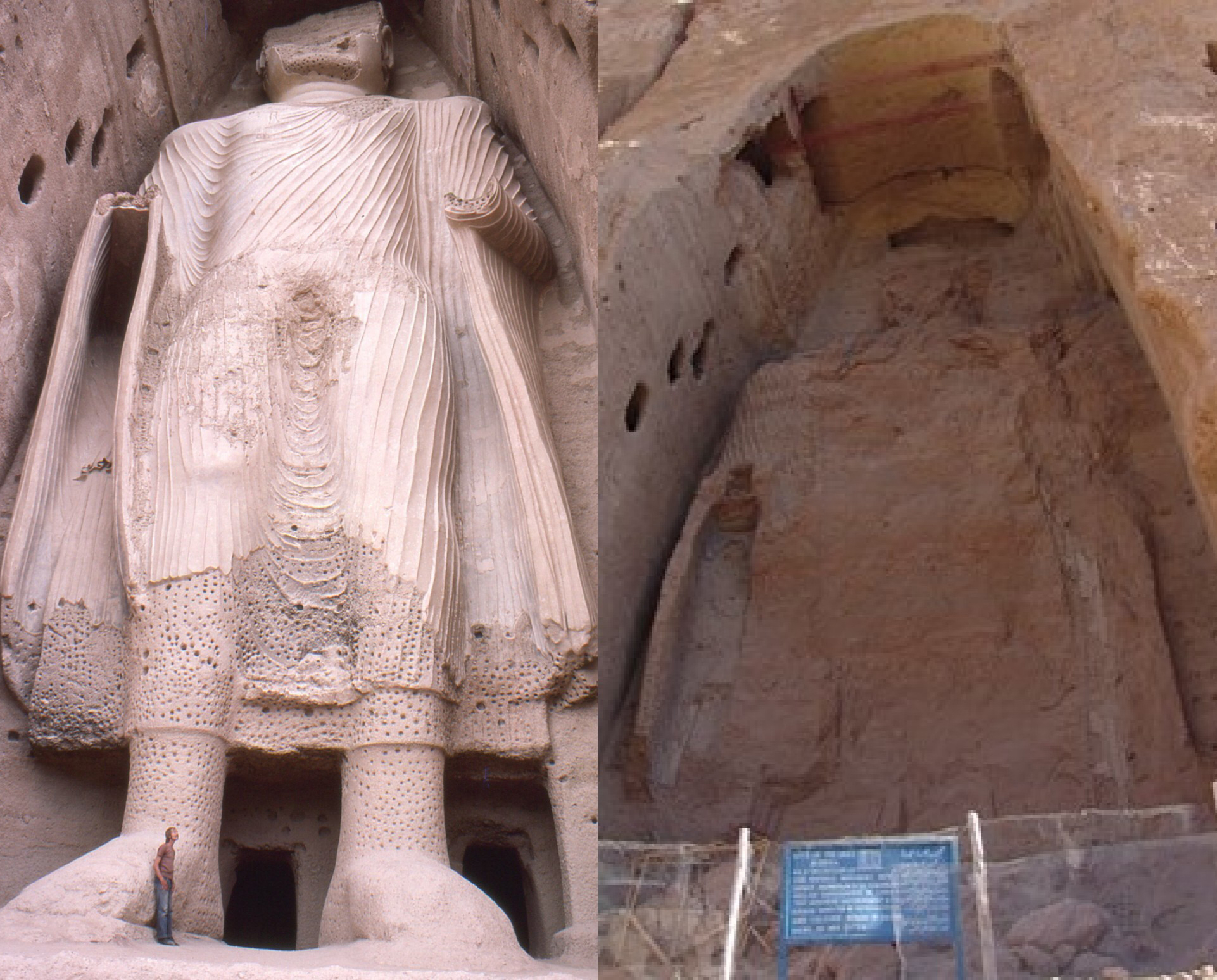
Smaller, 38 meter Buddha, before and after destruction.

The Afghan Taliban destroyed the Buddhist statues and other relics in Bamyan province in 2001. They also clamped down on other religions.

== Buddhist percentage by country ==
Below are the percentages of Buddhists in some of the Central Asian countries from many different sources:

Buddhism by country in the Central Asia
National flag	Country	Population(2007E)	% of Buddhists	Buddhist total
	Kazakhstan	15,422,000	0.50%	81,843
	Kyrgyzstan	5,317,000	0.35%	18,610
	Tajikistan	7,076,598	0.1%	7,076
	Turkmenistan	5,097,028	0.1%	5,097
	Uzbekistan	27,780,059	0.1%	5,300

== Gallery ==
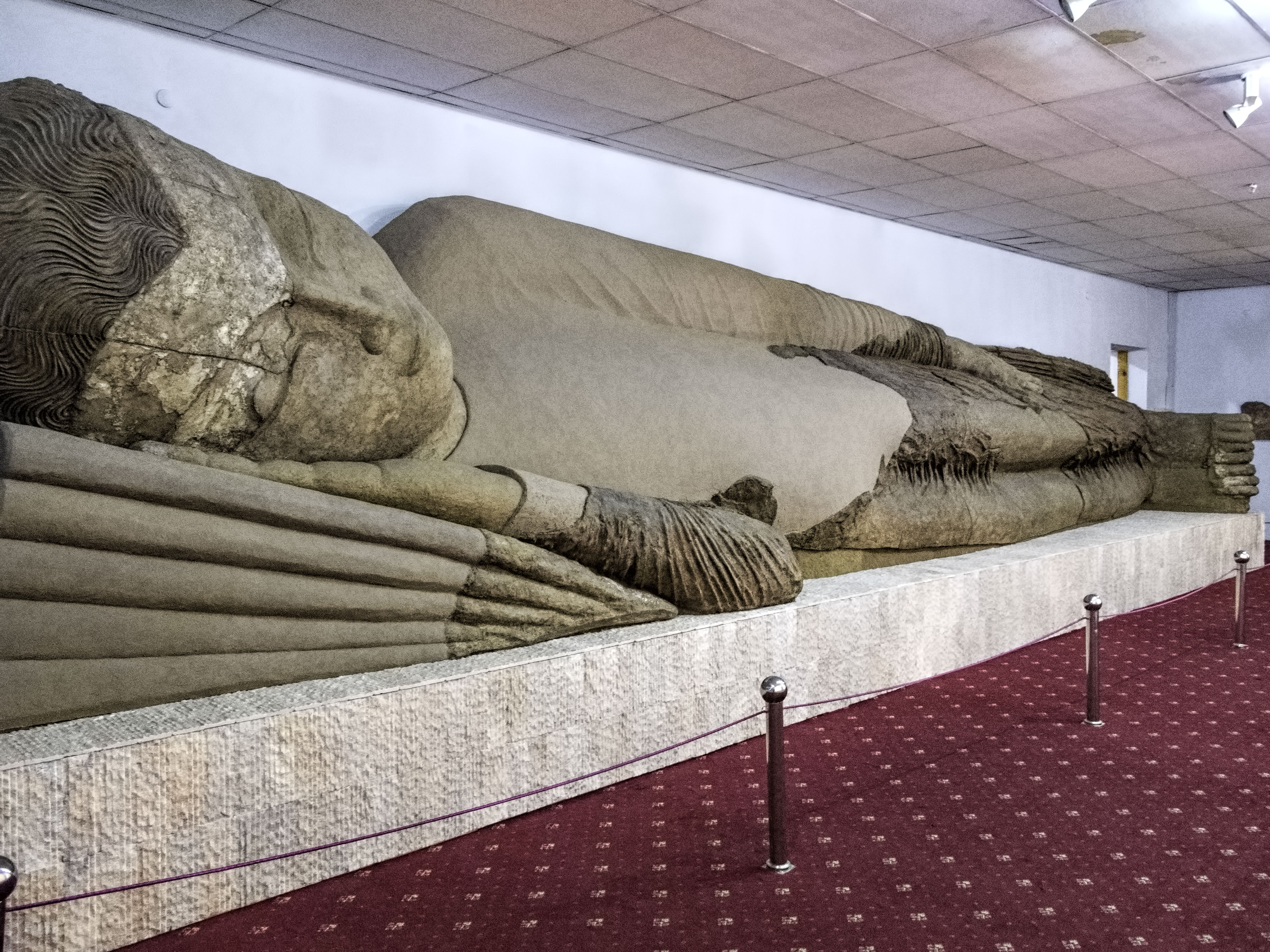
Buddha in Nirvana, 7th-8th Cent AD reclining Buddha statue 12 meters (39 feet) long.

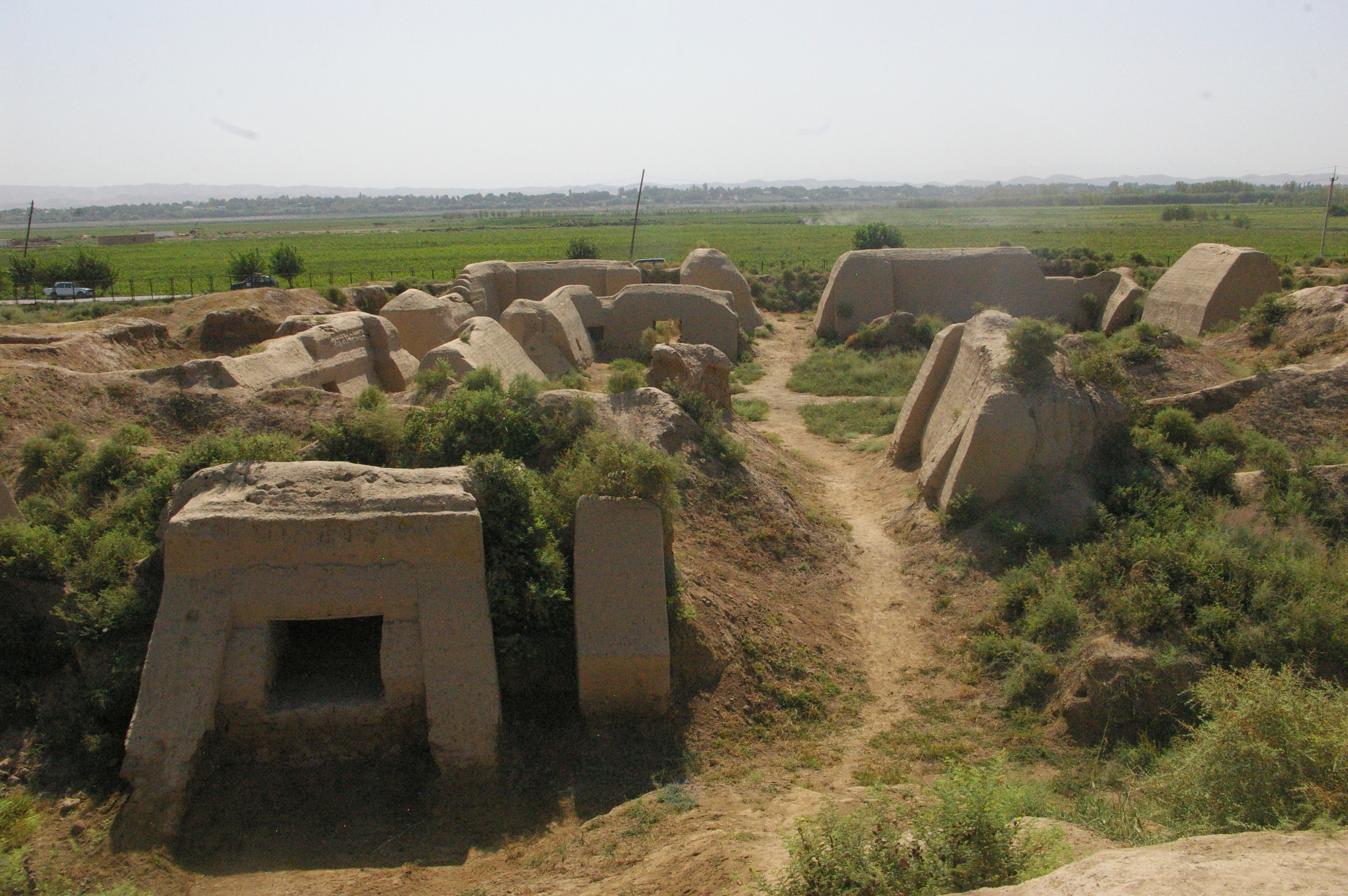
Buddhist cloister of Ajina Tepe, near Kurgan-Teppa, Tajikistan

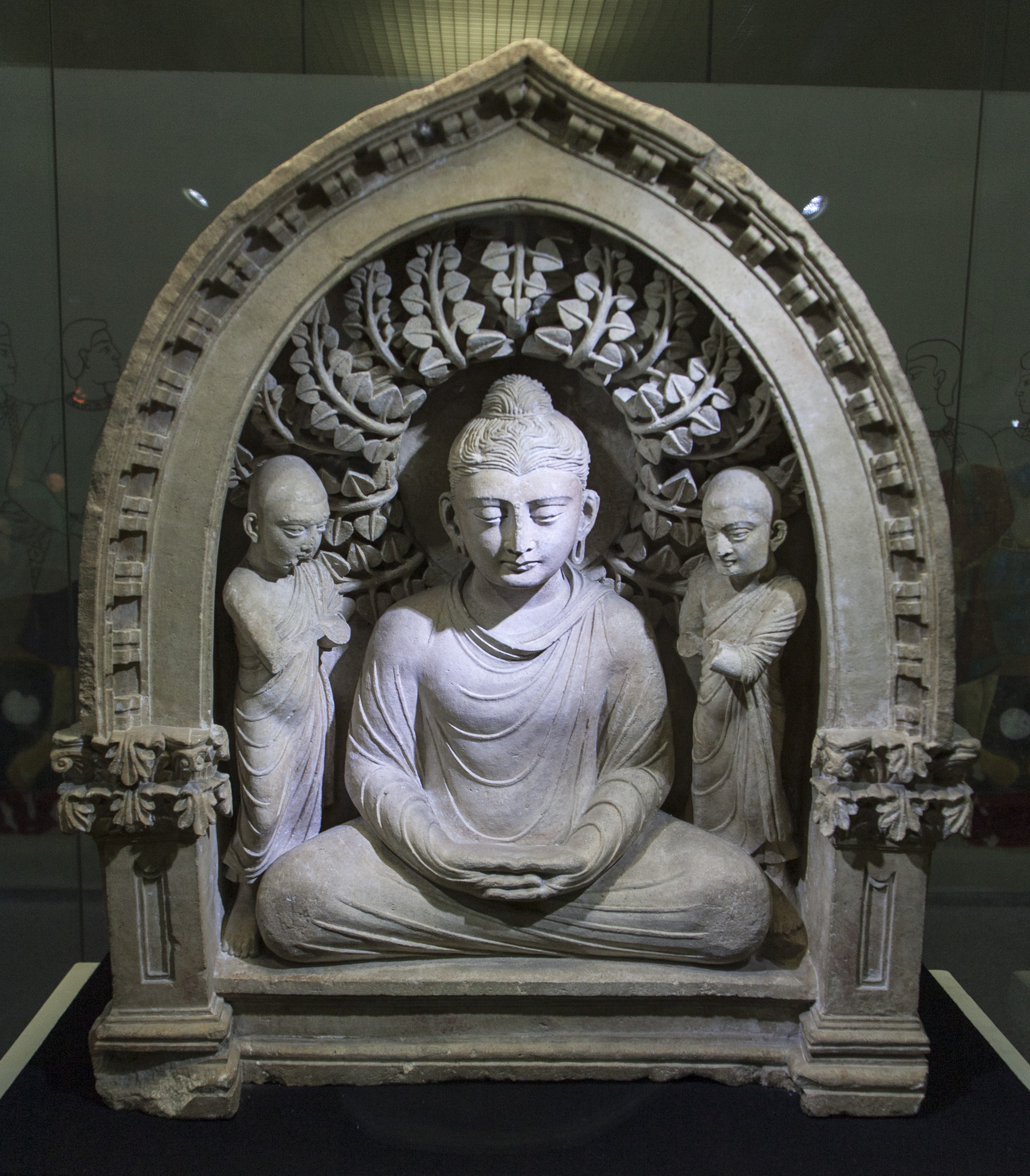
I-III cent. AD Fayaz Tepe. Old Termez, Uzbekistan

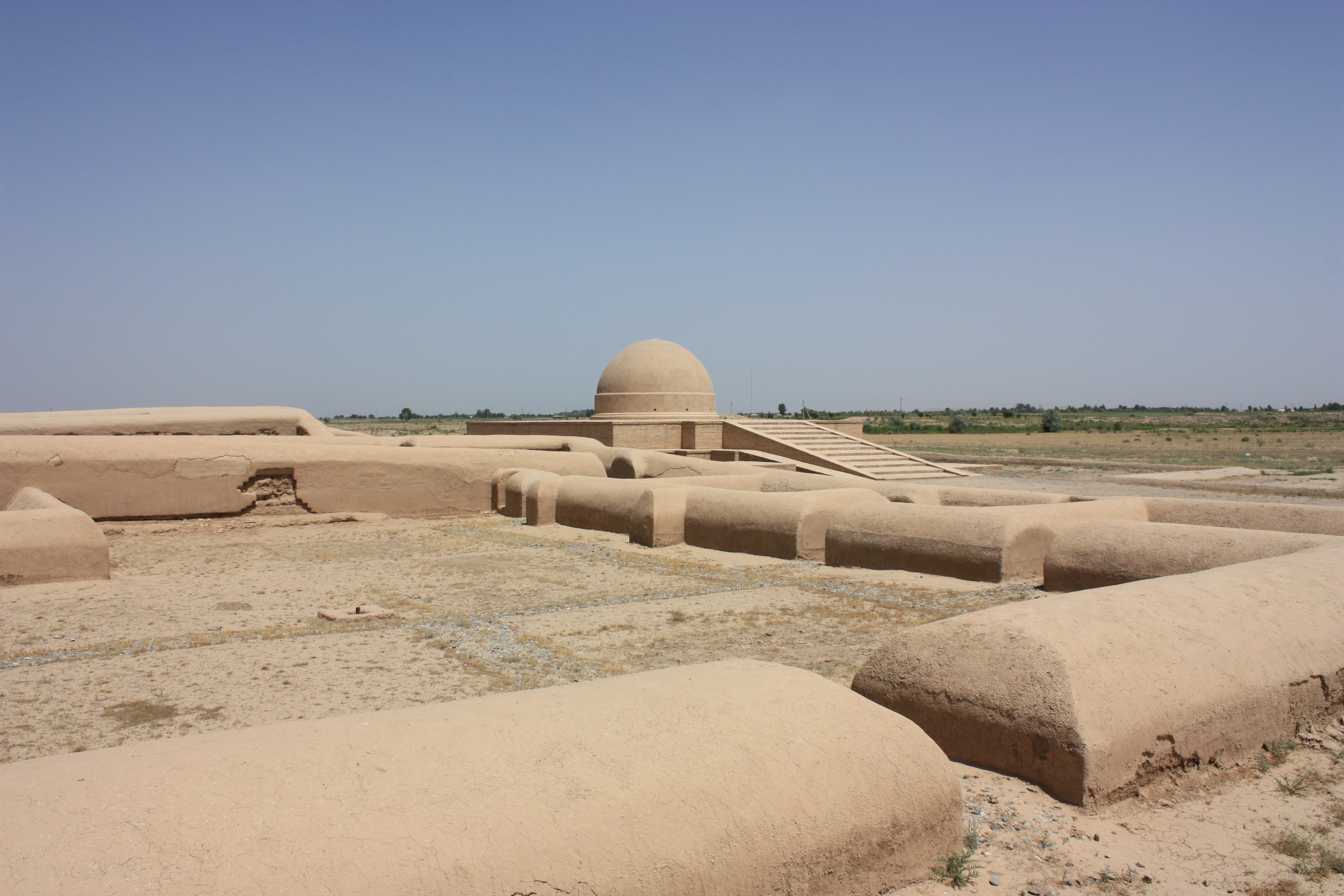
Fayaz Tepe

== See also ==
- Silk Road transmission of Buddhism
- Buddhism in Uzbekistan
- Buddhism in Kazakhstan
- Kingdom of Khotan
- Sogdiana
- Parthia
- Central Asians in ancient Indian literature
- Buddhism in Afghanistan
- Index of Buddhism-related articles
- Tengrism and Buddhism

== Bibliography ==
- Cribb, Joe (2010). Alram, M. (ed.). "The Kidarites, the numismatic evidence.pdf". Coins, Art and Chronology Ii, Edited by M. Alram et al. Coins, Art and Chronology II: 91–146.
- Klimkeit, Hans-Joachim (1990). Buddhism in Turkish Central Asia, Numen 37, 53 - 69
- Puri, B. N. (1987). Buddhism in Central Asia, Delhi: Motilal Banarsidass
- Kudara, Kogi (2002). A Rough Sketch of Central Asian Buddhism, Pacific World 3rd series 4, 93–107
- Kudara, Kogi (2002). The Buddhist Culture of the Old Uigur Peoples, Pacific World 3rd series 4, 183–195
- Halkias, Georgios (2014). “When the Greeks Converted the Buddha: Asymmetrical Transfers of Knowledge in Indo-Greek Cultures.” , Leiden: Brill, 65–116.
