= Buddhism in Kazakhstan =

Buddhism in Kazakhstan is a minority religion with historical presence since the 6th century. Ethnic groups such as the Kalmyks, Koreans and Mongols form the Buddhist population in the country.

According to the 2021 census, there are approximately 15,458 Buddhists in Kazakhstan, constituting less than 1% of the total population. This reflects a slight increase from the 2009 census, which reported 14,663 Buddhists.

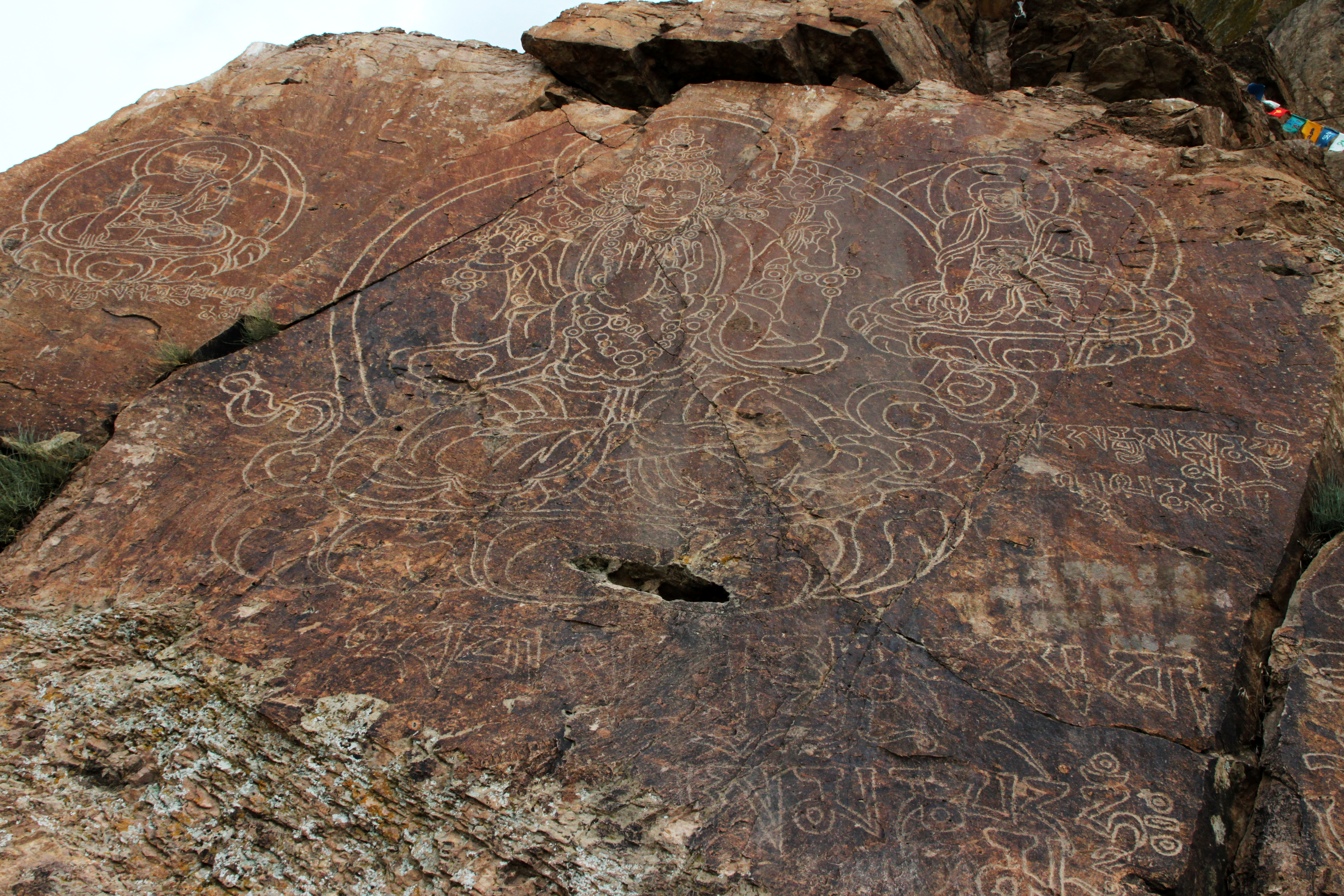
The Tamgaly-Tas Petroglyphs (Ili Kapshagai) are 17th-century rock carvings featuring Buddhist deities and Tibetan inscriptions, created by Oirat and Tibetan artists.

During the period of the Western Turkic Khaganate (approximately 600–700 CE), which spanned across areas that are now part of Kazakhstan, Uzbekistan, and other Central Asian regions, Buddhism was a widely supported and influential religion.

== Demographics ==
The Buddhist population is relatively small in the country, the 2021 census reveals that there are around 15,458 Buddhists in Kazakhstan, making up around 1% of the country's total population.

According to figures from 2007, about 0.5% of the total population were Buddhists.

== History ==
As early as the 6th century, Buddhism began influencing Turkic tribes in Central Asia. The Western Turkic Khaganate, which encompassed parts of present-day Kazakhstan, was a notable patron of Buddhism from the early 7th to early 8th centuries. During this period, Buddhist teachings and culture permeated the region, facilitated by the Silk Road's role as a conduit for religious and cultural exchange.

Archaeological discoveries in Kazakhstan highlight Buddhism's historical influence in the region. Notable evidence includes ancient Buddhist rock carvings found along the Ili River and in the Tarbagatai Mountains. Additionally, structures such as the Kyzyl Kent palace in Karaganda oblast and the Ablainkit fortress-monastery in East Kazakhstan oblast, both dating back to the 17th century, provide clear links to the region's Buddhist heritage.

In the 17th century, the Dzungar Khanate, a Mongol state had some presence in Kazakhstan. The Dzungar rulers followed Tibetan Buddhism, and their beliefs affected the culture and religion of the region. This influence can be seen in the Tamgaly-Tas Petroglyphs in Kazakhstan, which show Tibetan symbols and writings, reflecting the presence of Buddhism at that time.

=== Decline ===
The rise of Islam in the 10th century, particularly after it was declared the state religion by the Karakhanid dynasty, led to a gradual decline in Buddhism's prominence in Kazakhstan.

=== Recent history ===
As of 2019, Kazakhstan has only two officially recognized Buddhist organizations: one is affiliated with Won Buddhism, which originated in Korea, and the other is associated with Tibetan Buddhism.

== See also ==
- Buddhism in Central Asia
- Religion in Kazakhstan
- Buddhism in Uzbekistan
- Silk Road transmission of Buddhism
