= Central Asians in ancient Indian literature =

The ancient Indian literature contains numerous references to the people of Central Asia, reflecting a long history of socio-cultural, religious, political and economic contact since remote antiquity. The two regions have a common and contiguous border, climatic continuity, similarities in geographical features and geo-cultural affinity. For millennia, there has been a flow of people, material and ideas between the two.

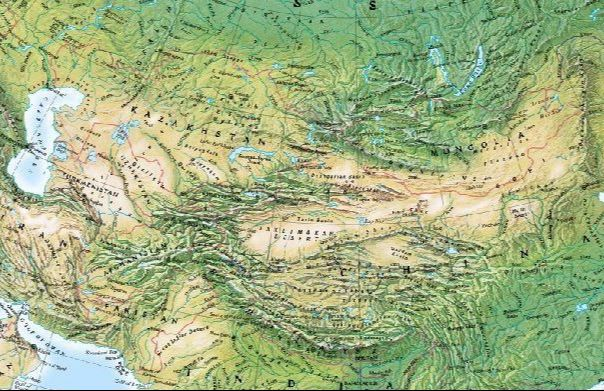
Physical map of Central Asia from the Caspian Sea to the west, to Inner Mongolia in the east.

== Migrations ==
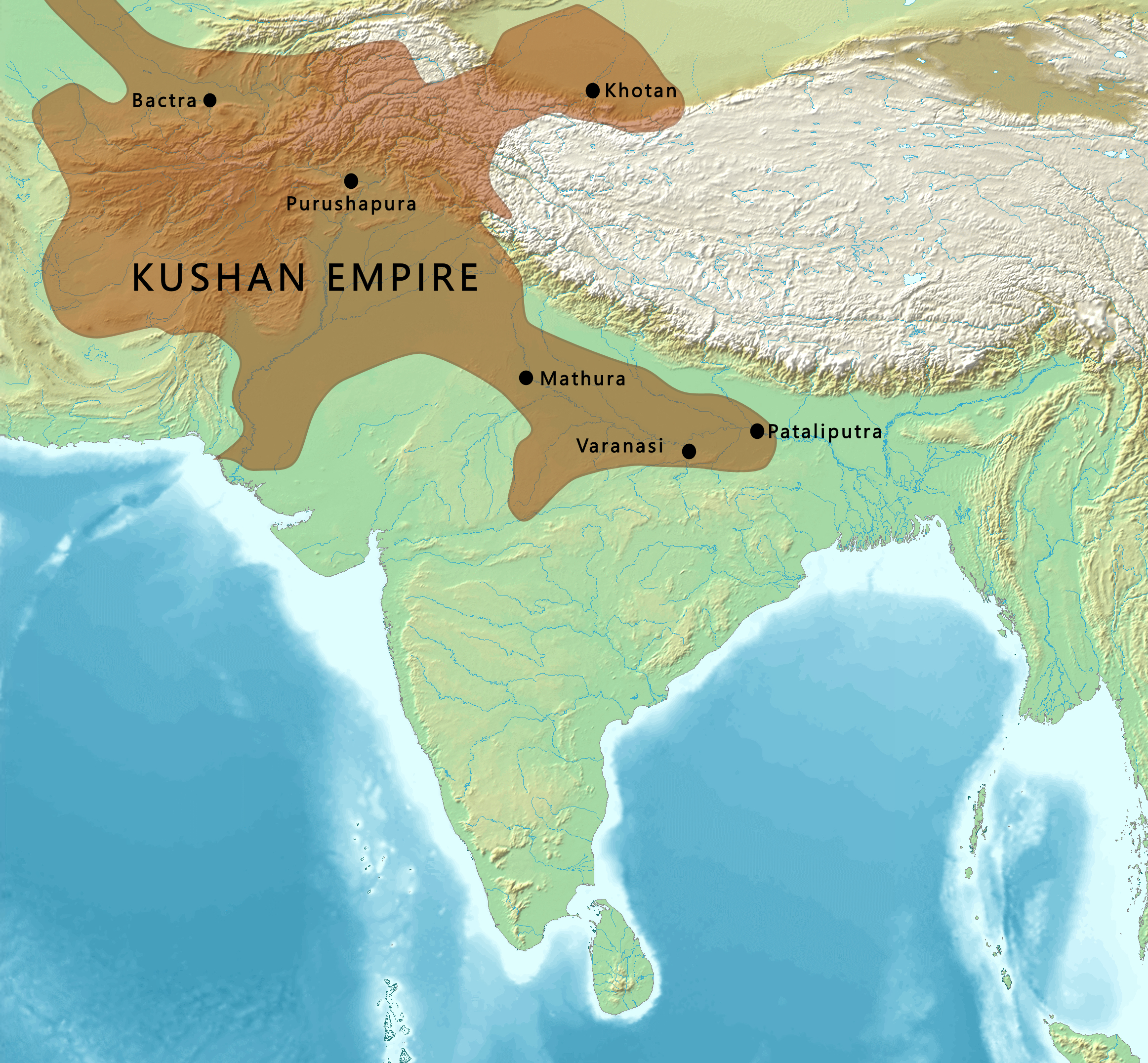
The 2nd century CE Kushan Empire

In the classical Indian literature, peoples like Shakas, Yavanas, Kambojas, Pahlavas, Paradas and others are attested to have arrived as invaders, ultimately being assimilated into the Indian society as Kshatriyas.

Chinese author Ma-twan-lin writes that, "The nomenclature of the early Sakas in India shows an admixture of Scythian, Parthian and Iranian elements. In India, the Scythians soon adapted themselves to their new environs and began to adopt Indian names and religious beliefs."

== In Indian literature ==
=== Vedic literature ===
Atharvaveda refers to Gandhari, Mujavat and Bahlika. Gandharis were from Gandhara, Mujavat (land of Soma) refers to Hindukush–Pamirs and possibly the Muztagh Ata mountain while Bahlikas were another northwestern people.

The post-Vedic Atharvaveda-Parisista (Ed Bolling & Negelein) makes first direct reference to the Kambojas (verse 57.2.5). It also juxtaposes the Kambojas, Bahlikas and Gandharas.

The Vamsa Brahmana of the Sama Veda refers to Madrakara Shaungayani as the teacher of Aupamanyava Kamboja. This connection between the Uttara Madras and the Kambojas is said to be natural because they were close neighbours in the north-west.

=== Manusmriti ===
Manusmriti asserts that the Kambojas, Sakas, Yavanas, Paradas, Pahlavas, etc., had been Kshatriyas of good birth but were gradually degraded to the barbaric status due to their not following the Brahmanas and the Brahmanical code of conduct.

The Silk Road route through which erstwhile Hindu Vedic societies became partially Buddhists as well as the Hindu names and history of these kingdoms lend credence to this idea. Furthermore, almost invariably, the royal clans of Central Asia and northwestern India claimed descent from historical Hindu royalties and royal lines such as Suryavanshi and Chandravanshi. Many of these kings and nobilities often claimed direct descent from Rama and Pandavas to strengthen their claim to throne.

=== Puranic literature ===
The Haihaya Yadavas are the first known invaders in the recorded history of the sub-continent. Described in the Puranas as allying with four other groups, the invaders were eventually defeated and assimilated into the local community under different castes from Kshatriyas to Shudras. Alberuni refers to this description, saying that the "five hordes" belonged to his own people, i.e. Central Asia.

The Puranic Bhuvanakosha attests that Bahlika was the northernmost Puranic Janapada of ancient India and was located in Udichya or Uttarapatha division of Indian sub-continent.

=== Kavyamimamsa of Rajashekhara ===
The 10th century CE Kavyamimamsa of Pandit Rajashekhara knew about the existence of several Central Asian tribes. He furnishes an exhaustive list of the extant tribes of his times and places the Shakas, Tusharas, Vokanas, Hunas, Kambojas, Vahlika, Vahlava, Tangana, Limpaka, Turushka and others together, styling them all as the tribes from Uttarapatha or north division.

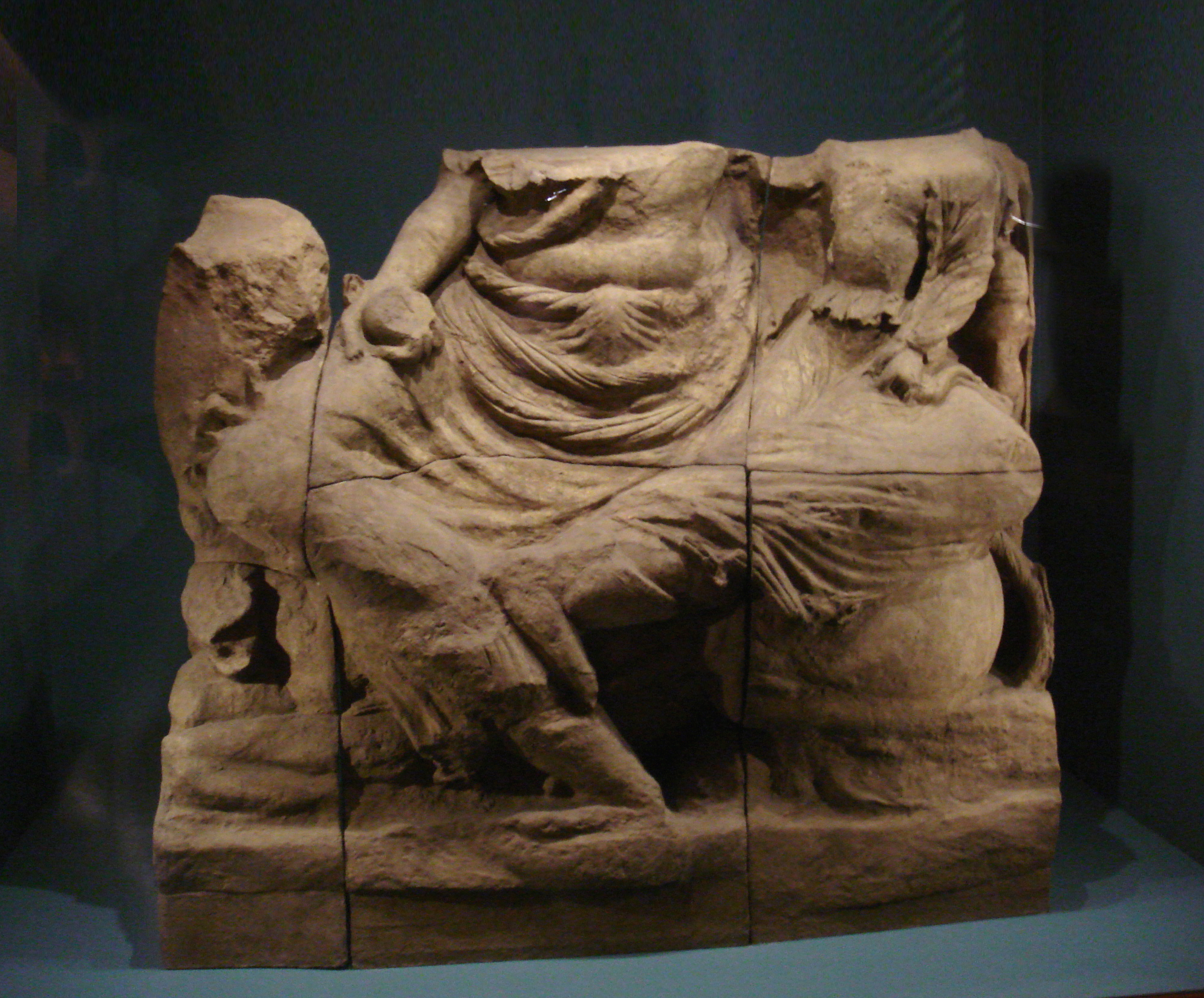
Uma-Maheshvara: ithyphallic Shiva with spouse Uma riding the bull Nandi, Penjikent Temple II, 690-722 CE, National Museum of Antiquities of Tajikistan

== See also ==
- Buddhism in Central Asia
- Indo-Scythian Kingdom
- Indo-Parthian Kingdom
- Uttarakuru

== Books and periodicals ==
- Ancient Kamboja, People and the Country, 1981, Dr Kamboj
- Political History of Ancient India, 1996, Dr H. C. Raychaudhury
- India and Central Asia, 1955, Dr P. C., Bagchi.
