= Buddhism in Uzbekistan =

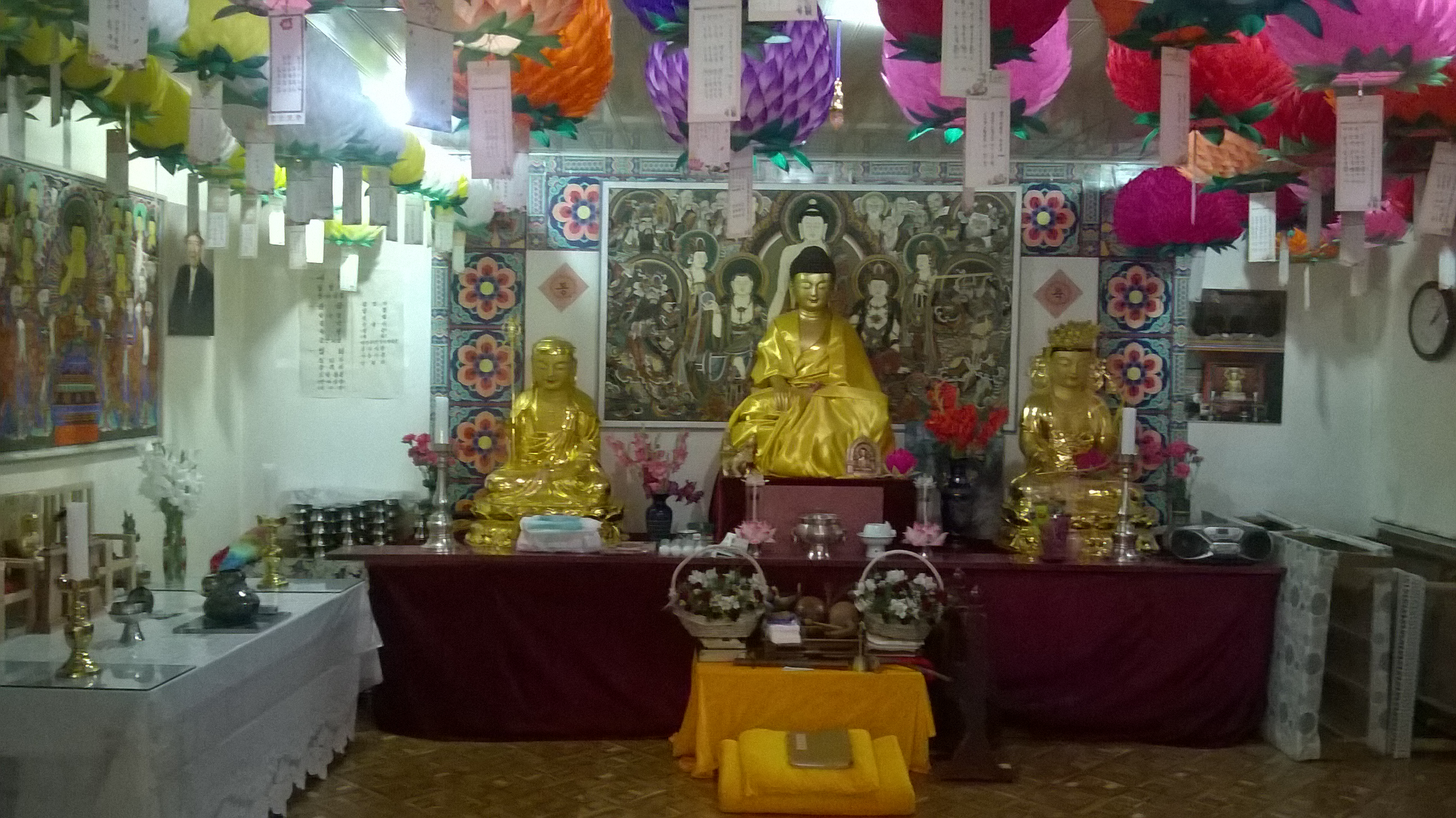
Buddhist temple in Tashkent

Buddhism is practiced by about 0.2% of the population of Uzbekistan, according to the US State Department's International Religious Freedom Report 2004. Most are ethnic Koreans. Officially only one Buddhist denomination is registered in Uzbekistan, also there is a Buddhist temple in Tashkent.

Since 1991, the temple is called "Jaeunsa" ("Compassion"), belonging to the Korea Buddhist Jogye Order. The temple is located on the outskirts of Tashkent and is the only functioning Buddhist temple in Uzbekistan.

== History ==
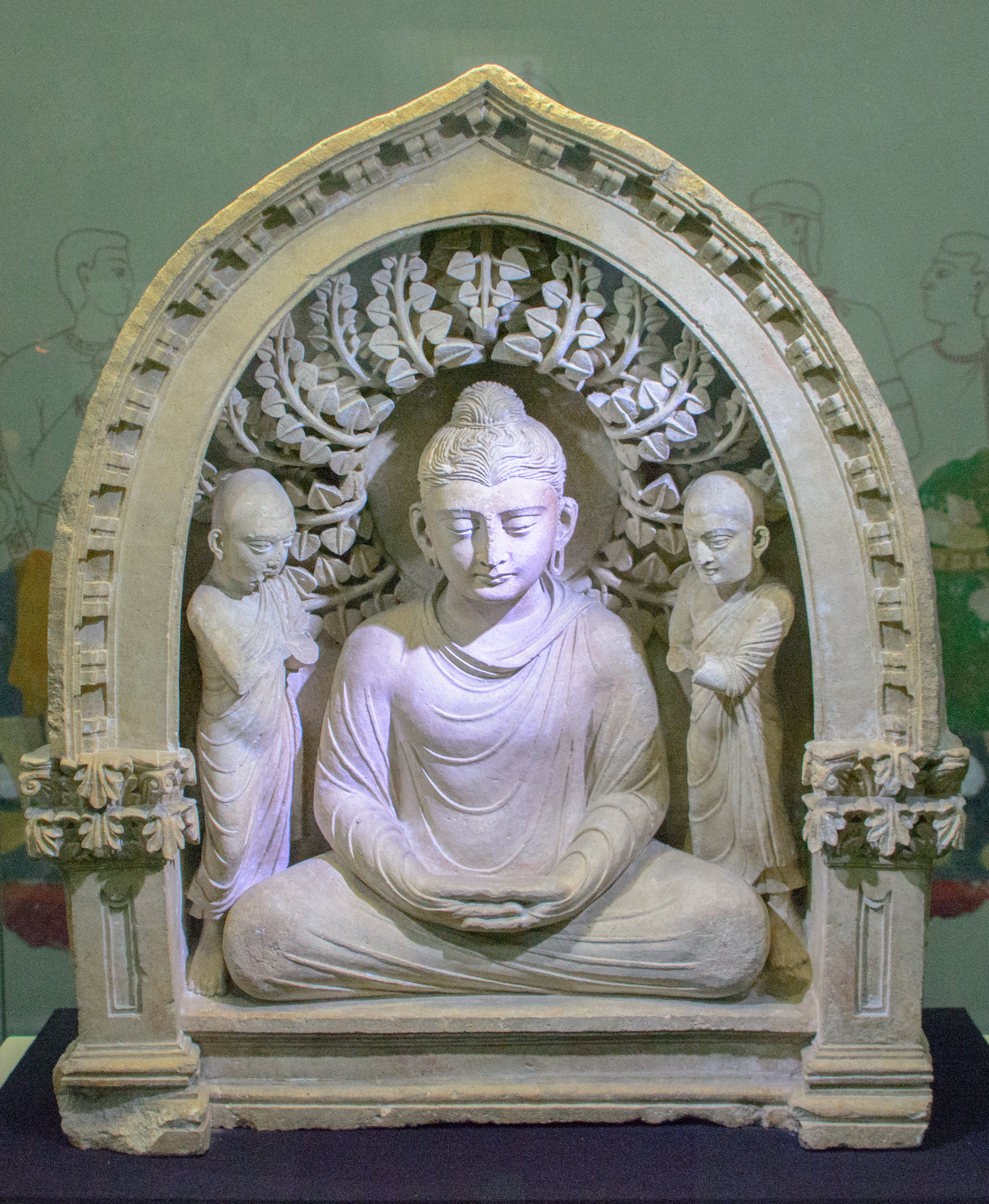
Termez Fayaz Tepe Complex 1st–3rd century CE Buddha with Monks 2nd century CE

In the time of the rulers of the Kushan Empire, Buddhism in large scale penetrated into Bactria and Gandhara. According to a legend written in Pali two merchants from Bactria, Trapusa and Bahalika, hit the road to meet with the Buddha and became his disciples. Later, they returned to Bactria and built temples in honor of the Buddha.

The popularity of Buddhism has been linked to his understanding as an ideology of the urban population. Kanishka the Great confirmed the significantly simplified "way of salvation" of Mahayana Buddhism, which contributed to its mass popularity.

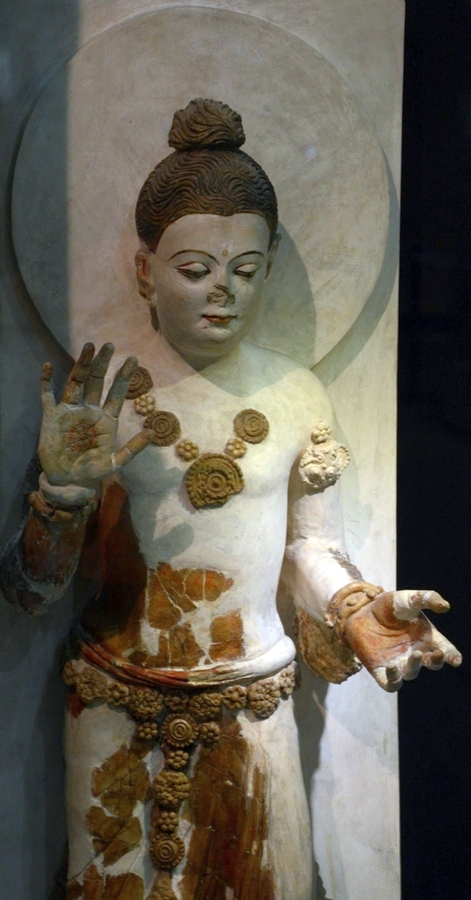
Fayaz Tepe, Standing Buddha

After the invasion of the White Huns, as well as during the Islamic invasion like Muslim conquest of Transoxiana, Buddhism ceased to be a widespread and popular religion in the territory of Uzbekistan. By the 13th century it disappeared almost completely as a result of the persecution of Buddhists during the reign of Khorezm.

== See also ==
- Buddhism in Central Asia
- Buddhism in Kazakhstan
- Great Tang Records on the Western Regions
- Religion in Uzbekistan
- Silk Road transmission of Buddhism
