= Tamgaly-Tas Petroglyphs (Ili Kapshagai) =

17th Century rock etchings in Kazakhstan

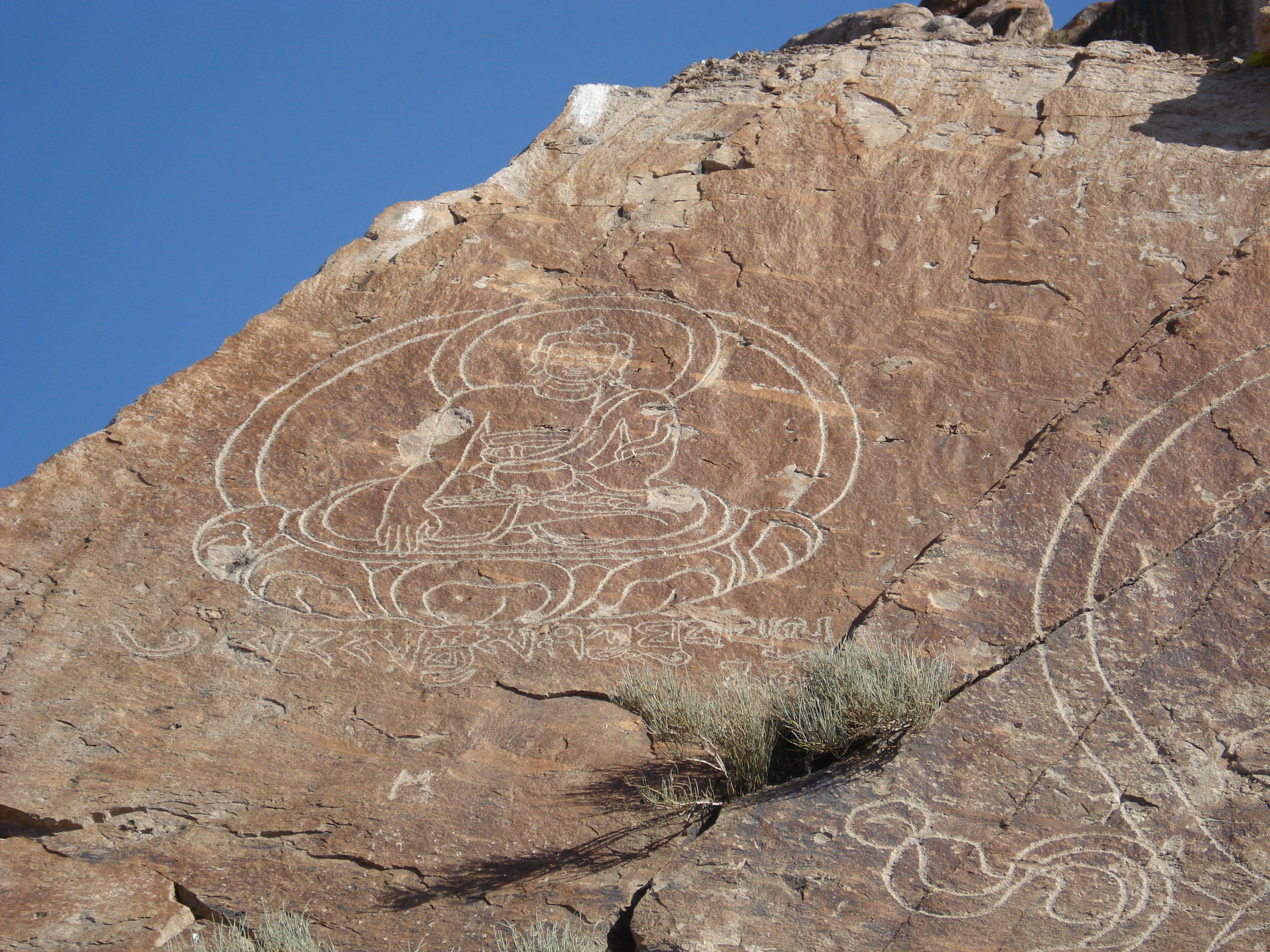
- Interactive map of Tamgaly-Tas Petroglyphs
- Location: Almaty Region, Kazakhstan

Site notes
- Area: Kapchagai city

Petroglyphs of Tamgaly Tas – "open-air temple" with rock paintings of Tibetan iconography and inscriptions dated to the second half of the 17th century. Cave paintings were created by the Oirat and Tibetan masters with the active participation of Galdan-Huntaydzhi (Galdan Boshugtu Khan). In 1677, Galdan created the first "iconostasis" of the figure of Bodhisattva Avalokiteshvara-Shadakshari in the image of a deity with four hands, sitting in a diamond pose on a Lotus throne. In the next 5 years, he and his assistants supplemented the images and Tibetan mantras of the Tamgaly-Tas rock. The Dzungarian ruler Galdan-Boshohtu Khan was a fanatically religious man with a deep knowledge of Buddhist symbolism, Tibetan painting and its techniques, and Tibetan iconographic canons. This is confirmed by the image of Avalokiteshvara-Shadakshari in the form of a one-faced deity with four hands, who was the patron of the lords of Tibet. After the expulsion of the Dzungarian khanate from the Kazakh lands, the former temple received a new name from the Kazakhs – Tamga or Tamgaly-Tas (Tamgaly-Tash).

In 1771, the last inscription was created on the rocks of Tamgaly TAS-a thanksgiving praise left by the Volga Kalmyks. Petroglyphs are also known for the fact that on the famous Tamgaly stone-Tash Ablai Khan and Sultan Abulfeiz, after the expulsion of the Dzungars, put a Tamga-a signature or brand confirming the ownership of the territory by the Uysun and Naiman tribes. For about 175 years, starting from the middle of the 19th century, prayer texts and "iconostases" were studied by prominent scientists and researchers, namely:

- 1856-CH. CH. Valikhanov
- 1877-K. A. Larionov
- 1898-F. V. Poyarkov
- 1896-1898-N. N. Pantusov and a.m. Pozdneev
- 2008-2010 - I. V. Erofeeva, A. E. Rogozhinsky, B. Zh. Aubekerov, R. Sala, Zh. M. Deom, N. S. yakhontova, Yu. I. Elikhina

At the foot of the river on 15 separate scattered blocks are large images of Buddhist deities and Tibetan and Oirat inscriptions. "Iconostases" consist of 5 images of deities - Avalokitesvara bodhisattva, Buddha Bhaisajyaguru and Buddha Shakyamuni. Next to the image of the deities are carved prayer texts, mantras of the Buddha Manzhushri, an appeal to the Panchen Lama of Tibet Lobsang Choiji Zhalsan, four six-syllable mantras om ma ni pad me hum, three six-syllable mantras "hail Lama with a good mind... knowledge and mercy", addressed to the Buddha Shakyamuni, two manzhushri mantras and a mantra to the Buddha Akshobhya. Later, ten texts of the six-syllable mantra om ma ni pad me hum were written in Oirat "clear writing".

The latest prayer inscription is the longest vertical and voluminous Oirat text, which was printed in italics "clear letter" by the Volga Kalmyks, who fled in 1771 to the Ili river valley. This text contains a thank-you message to the depicted Buddhas for "overcoming danger and disease" and for "peace and prosperity in the country".

In the 1950s – 70s, new images appeared on the southern part of the Tamgalyzhar cliff, which were used in cinematographic filming and do not bear historical heritage.

== Location of the object ==
Republic of Kazakhstan, Almaty Region, 120 km North of Almaty (Kapchagai district), on the right Bank of the Ili river. Petroglyphs are located on the left Bank of the river Or in the Habatsagai tract-modern Kapchagai between the mouth of the left tributary of the Kurta and the steppe river Shengeldy.

== Preservation of the monument ==
Petroglyphs are included in the State list of historical and cultural monuments of local significance of the Almaty region, 2010 (No. 1519) as a monument of the "early iron"era. This Dating is incorrect. The monument has been under state protection since 1981, but there is no physical protection at the site. Access to the monument is not restricted and due to its close location to the highway and the city of Kapchagai, new inscriptions, autographs, etc. appear near the rocks.

== See also ==
- List of protected areas of Kazakhstan
- Petroglyphs within the Archaeological Landscape of Tamgaly
- Buddhism in Kazakhstan

== Sources of information about the monument ==
- Pantusov N. N. Tamgali-TAS // PTCL. Vol. 4. Tashkent, 1899. Pp. 52–59.
- Rogozhinsky A. E. History of studying And new research of the tamgalytas cult complex on the Ili river (ili Kapshagai) / / the Role of nomads in the formation of the cultural heritage of Kazakhstan. Scientific readings in memory of N. E. Masanov. Collection of materials interd. science. conferences. Almaty, 2010. pp. 474–489.
- 3. Erofeeva I. V. Buddhist monasteries of the Oirats in Semirechye (mid-17th to mid-19th century) / / Mongolia–XVIII. Saint Petersburg: Petersburg Oriental Studies, 2017. Pp. 35–47.
