= Kara Tepe =

Buddhist archeological site

Coordinates: 37.278239°N 67.182916°E

Kara Tepe

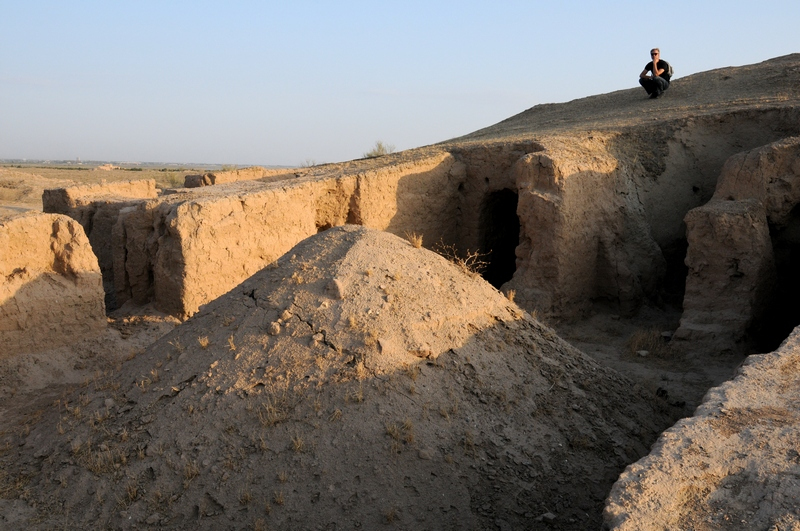
Kara Tepe, West, Round Stupa 100-600 CE

Location of Kara Tepe
Kara Tepe (Uzbekistan)
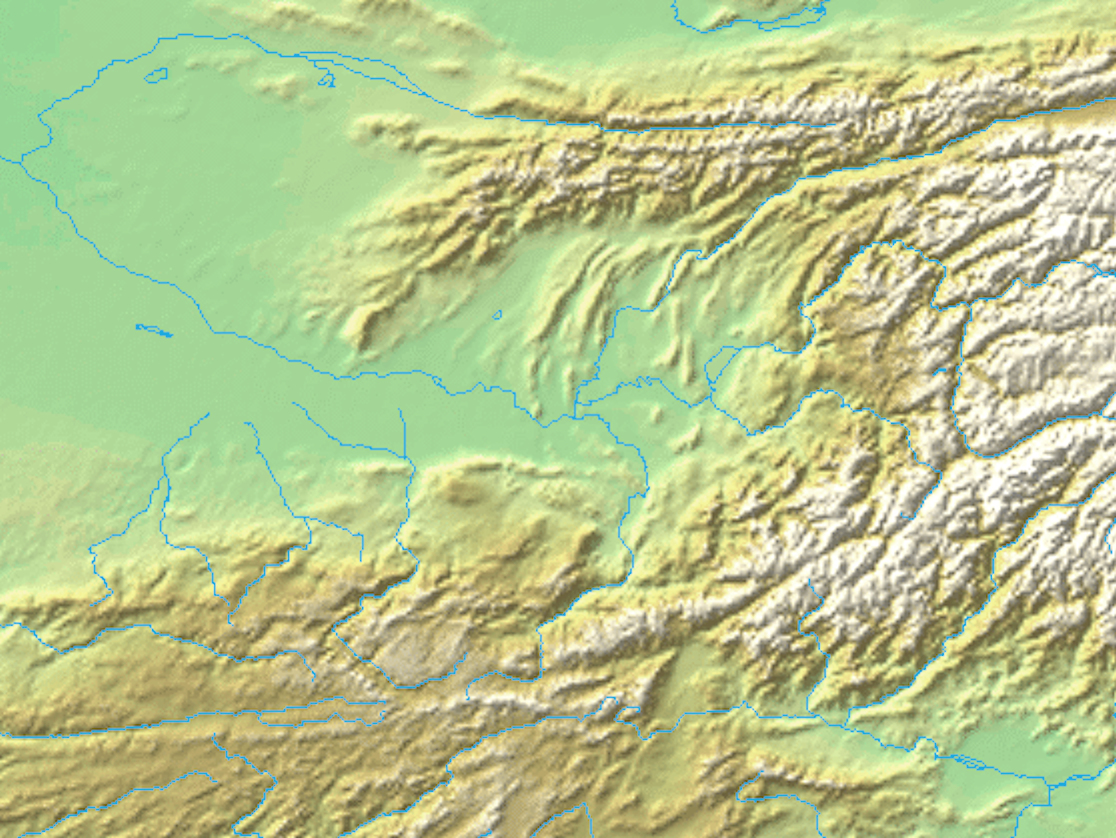
Kara Tepe (Bactria)

Kara Tepe is a Buddhist archaeological site in the Central Asia region of Bactria, in the Termez oasis near the city of Termez in southern Uzbekistan. The foundations of the site date to the 1st century CE, with a peak of activity around the 3rd and 4th centuries during the Kushan period, before experiencing a fatal decline around the 5th century CE, probably with the invasion of the Kushano-Sassanian, whose coinage can be found on the site. Most inscriptions of the Kushan and Kushano-Sasanian periods come from the Buddhist monasteries of Kara-tepe and Fayaz-tepe.

== History ==
The earliest Buddhist worship structures in Qoratepa, also known as Qoratag, date back to the 1st century CE. The peak of Qoratepa coincides with the 1st to 3rd centuries CE, during which many worship complexes were built. The earlier ones were renovated and expanded. During this period, Buddhist monks, their novices, city officials, and benevolent city dwellers played significant roles and offered support.

=== Artifacts ===
Numerous inscriptions on the remnants found in Qoratepa reveal details about the site. According to the inscriptions, some monastic establishments at Qoratepa include Kxadevakavixara - Podsho Monastery, Vxara Gulavxara vxad - Gulavxara's son (Gondafar) Monastery, and Okavixara. Some of the known monks mentioned in the Qoratepa inscriptions are Buddashir, Buddxamitra, and Jivananda. There are preserved depictions of men and women worshippers on the walls as well as statues of Buddha. Many Buddha statues have been found in Qoratepa.

=== Abandonment ===
By the end of the 3rd century CE, the Qoratepa monastic communities either fell into decline or were abandoned due to the military campaigns of the Sasanian Empire against the Kushan state. In some monastic cells, hearths were installed. During the same period, certain sections of Qoratepa monastic complexes continued to function until the late 4th and early 5th centuries. From the late 4th century onwards, some of the buildings and worship chambers of Qoratepa were used as burial sites, while the entrance areas were filled with rubble and soil.

=== Findings ===
The earliest burials included remnants of clothing and textiles in Sogdian style, Peroz bowls, and bowls decorated with bird motifs. Subsequent burials dated to the 5th-6th centuries included the burial of Termez rulers with one side bearing a leopard figure. Hephthalite inscriptions were found in Kara Tepe.

From the 7th to the 12th centuries, ascetics used some of the semi-ruined monastic cells and chambers in Qoratepa. The initial graves contain Sogdian-style combs, combs with handles, and eye pendants, horn-shaped spatulas, medallions, and comb cases with engravings, Sassanian pottery and lamps, spindle whorls, and an inkwell. They were adorned with inscriptions in Indian scripts (Kharoshthi and Brahmi) and drawings on the walls, including Kushan-Bactrian and Pahlavi-Fars.

== Archaeological research ==
Initially, in the years 1926–1928, the State Museum of Oriental Art in Moscow conducted an expedition related to the culture of Eastern peoples. In 1937, Mikhail Masson, Y. G. Pchelina conducted research work. In the 1960s, archaeologist B. Y. Stavisky led archaeological excavations. Later, joint Uzbekistan-Japan archaeological expeditions took place.

== Repairings ==
Repairs to the monastery in Qoratepa were carried out in the 4th and 5th centuries. The local sculptures were restored, and new wall paintings were created (mostly in one color and located lower than the previous ones). Many pilgrims from India visited the monastery. In the 5th century, the monastery was finally abandoned, and its premises began to be used as a cemetery. The findings from the graves indicate that in the 8th century, the Christian monastery was active.

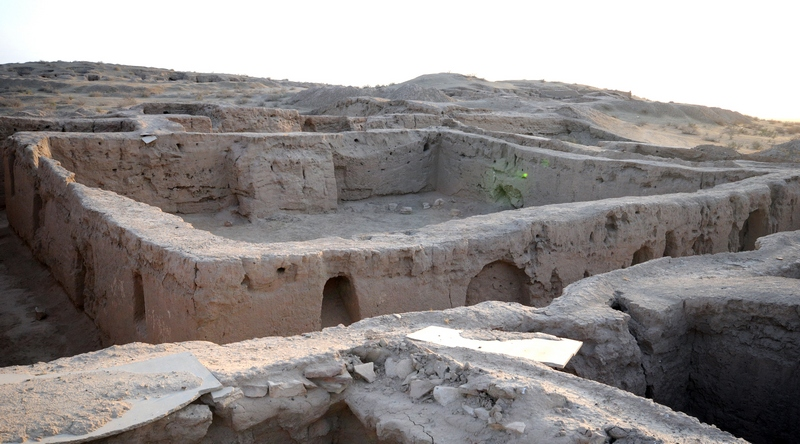
North court

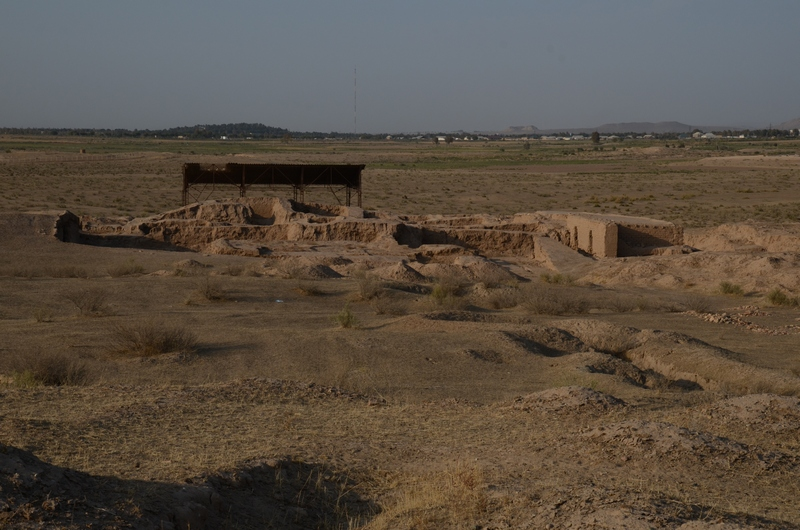
General view, northern area

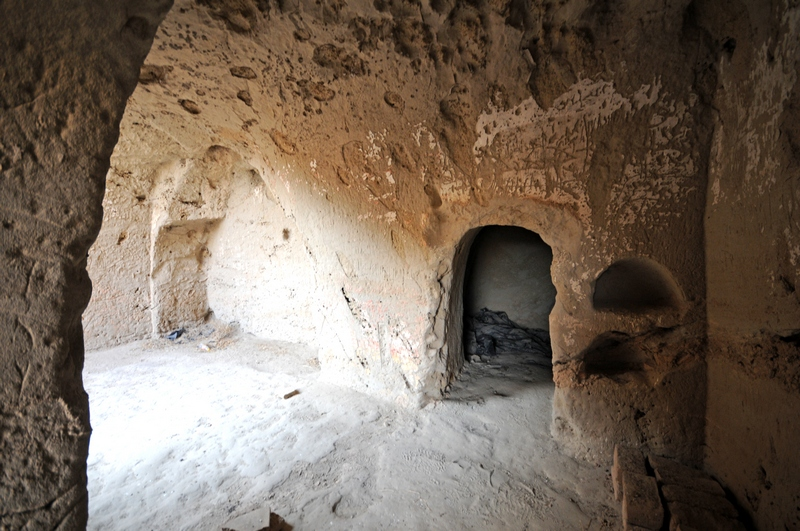
Inside a cave

== Artefacts ==
Many niches were found that sheltered sculptures of gold or ceramic Buddhas, and awnings rested on impressive colonnades. Remarkably, some of the Buddha statues are surrounded by a full halo, which became current in Turkestan and East Asia after the Kushan period. A Brahmi inscription was also recovered from the site.

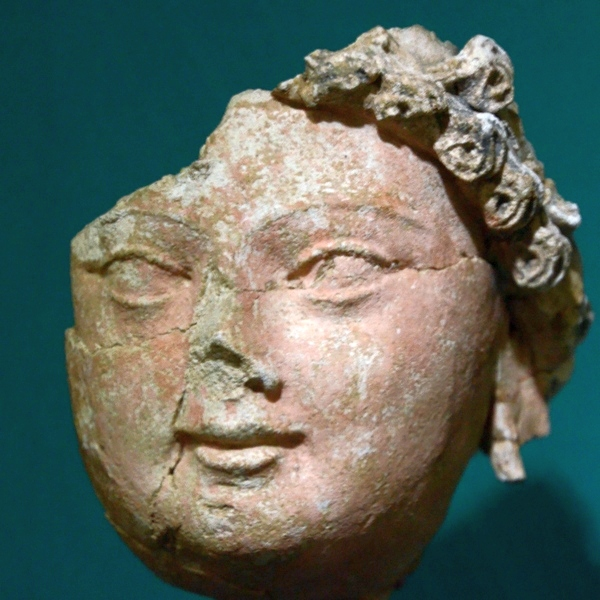
Terracotta head (200-400 CE)

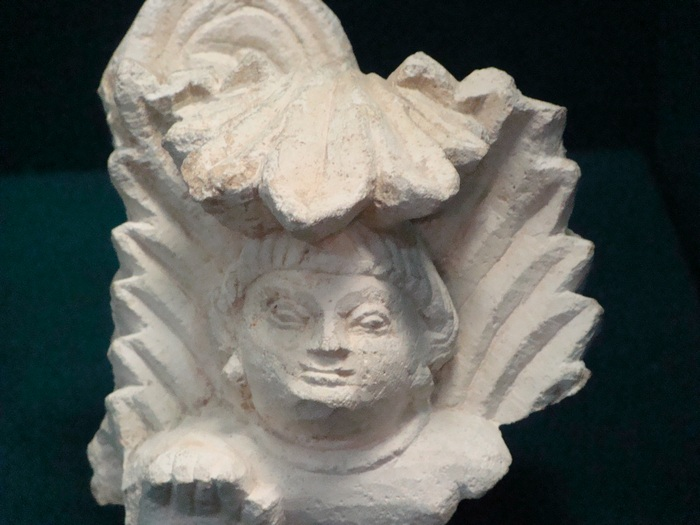
Relief (200-400 CE)

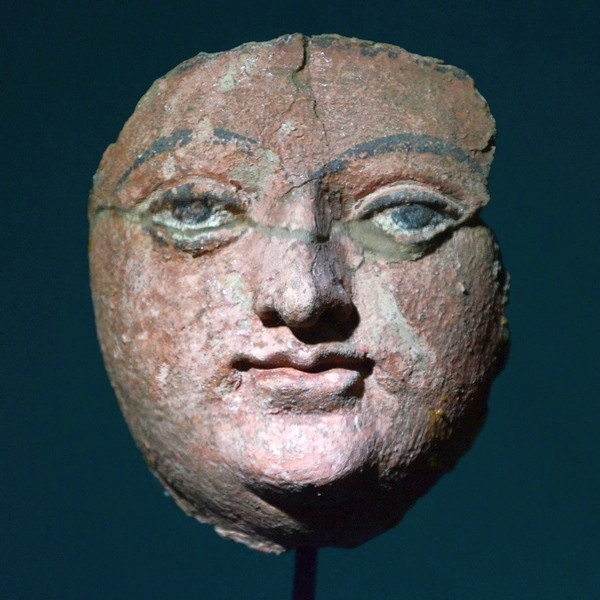
Terracotta head

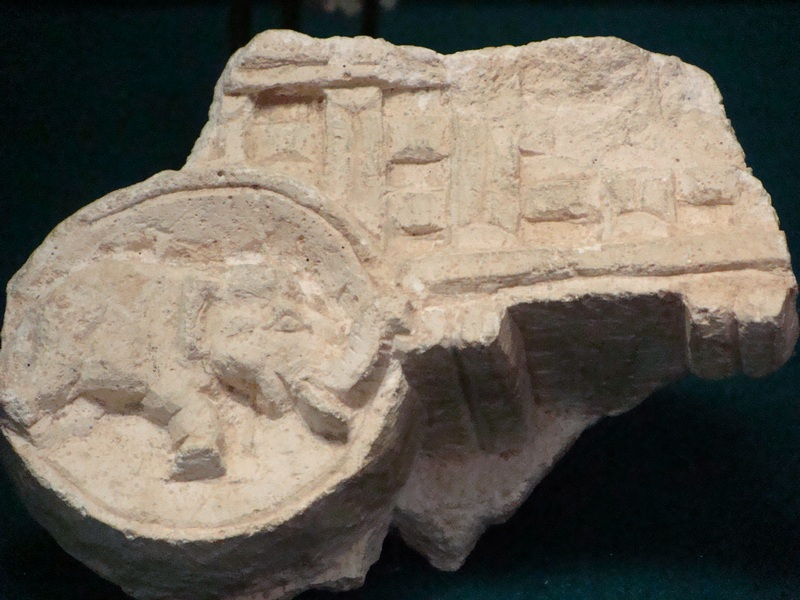
Frieze of an elephant

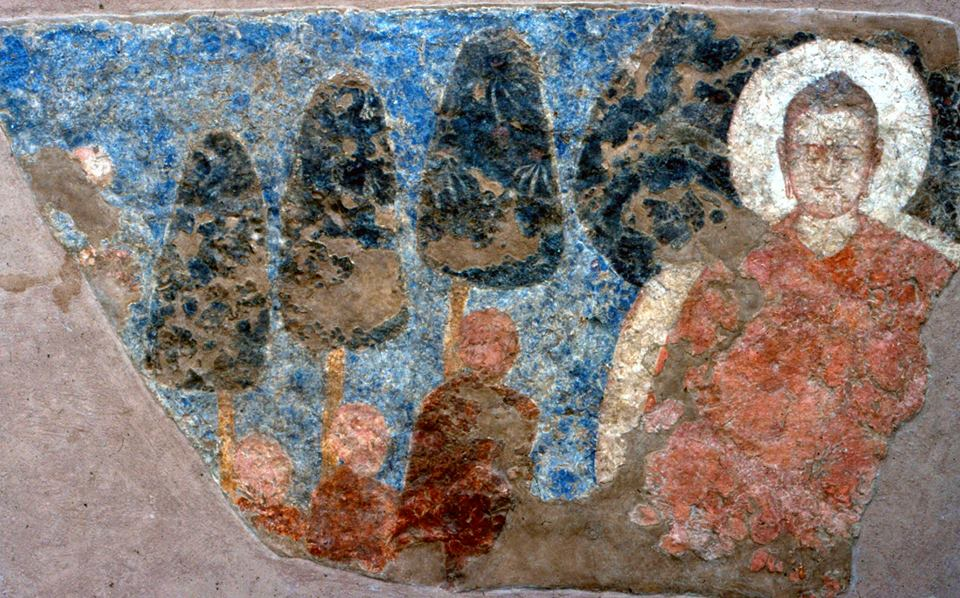
Kara Tepe mural, 2nd-4th century CE.

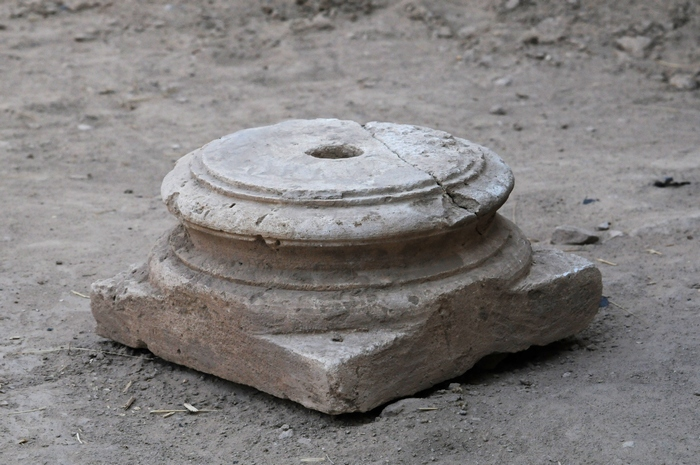
"Greek" column base

== See also ==
- Dalverzin Tepe
- Khalchayan
- Surkh Kotal
