= Fayaz Tepe =

Archaeological site

Coordinates: 37.286265°N 67.188027°E

Fayaz Tepe

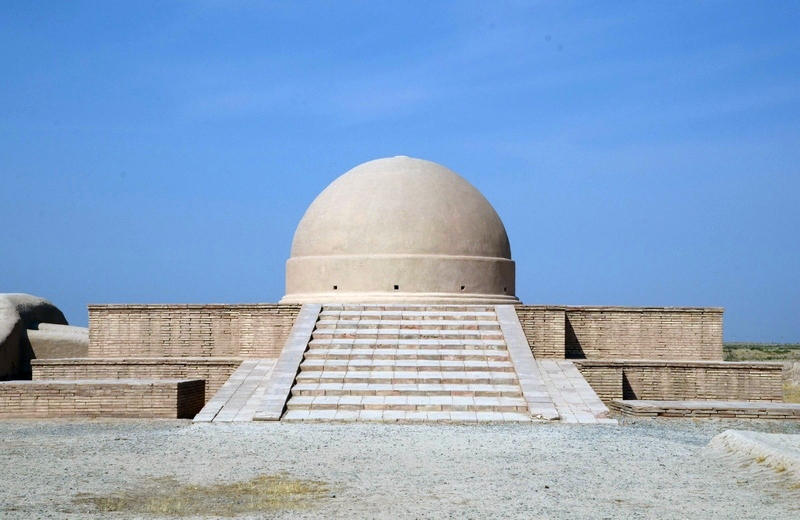
The reconstructed Stupa at Fayaz Tepe

Location of Fayaz Tepe
Fayaz Tepe (Uzbekistan)
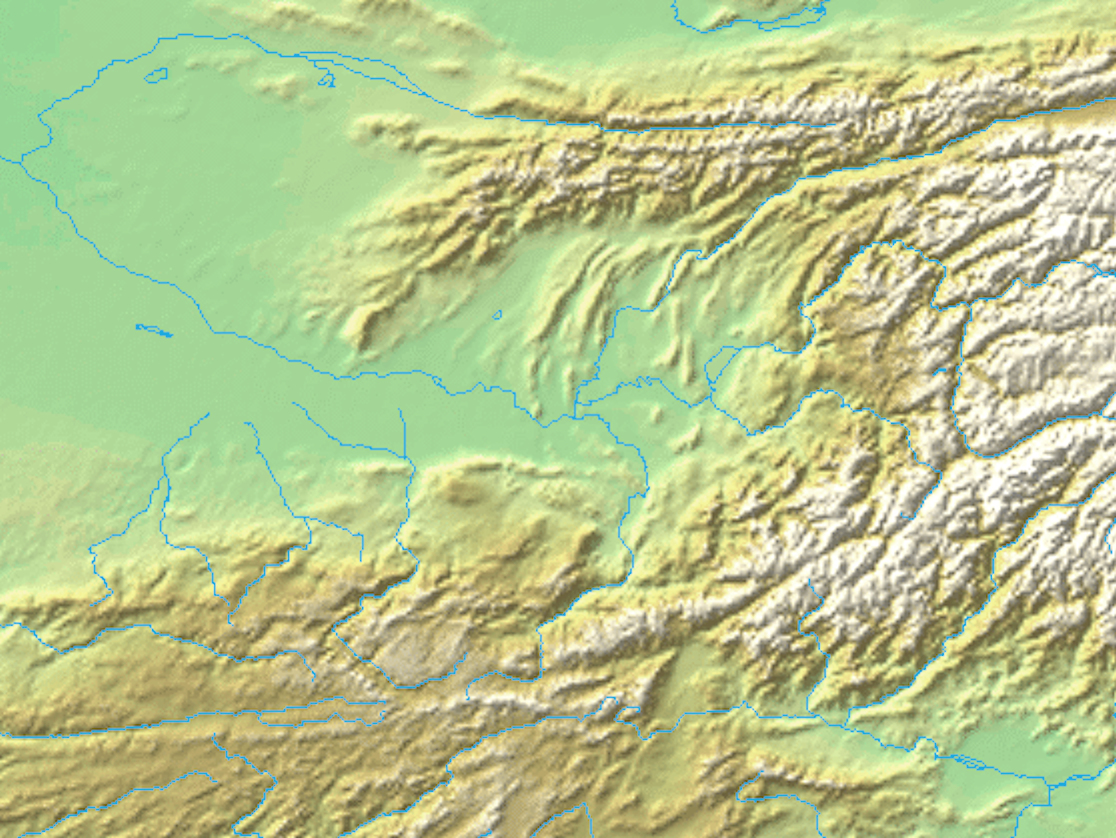
Fayaz Tepe (Bactria)

Fayaz Tepe, also Fayoz-Tepe, is a Buddhist archaeological site in the Central Asia region of Bactria, in the Termez oasis near the city of Termez in southern Uzbekistan. Located 15 km west of Termez off the main M39 highway. Bus number 15 runs past the turn-off to Fayaz Tepe, from where it is a 1 km walk without shade. The foundations of the site date to the 1st century CE, with a peak of activity around the 3rd and 4th centuries during the Kushan period, before experiencing a fatal decline around the 5th century CE, probably with the invasion of the Kushano-Sassanian, whose coinage can be found at the nearby site of Kara Tepe. Most inscriptions of the Kushan and Kushano-Sasanian periods come from the Buddhist monasteries of Kara-tepe and Fayaz-tepe.

== History ==
The Fayaztepa complex is located in Termez, near the northwestern ruins of the old Termez. In 1968, a sculpture of Buddha made of alabaster was found in the dunes by Absadom Beknaev, which was later transferred to the local history museum. Between 1968 and 1976, this finding was studied by L. I. Albaum.

After the square of Fayaztepa was cleared of sand dunes, the architecture of the monument began to be studied. Fayaztepa consists of three monumental structures: a temple in the central part, a monastery in the northwest, and utility buildings in the southeast. The total area of the complex is 1.5 square kilometers. One distinctive feature is an unusual stupa located not in the central part but outside the area, parallel to the sacred altar. These parts are connected by a brick and stone path that crosses the square. In the temple, whose walls are adorned with various colorful paintings, there is a monument to Buddha (Bodhisattva). Along the walls of the temple, there were once monuments dedicated to Buddha, with a height of up to four meters.

Originally, many of the monuments were red in color but were later covered in gold paint. On the southern part of the temple, there is an image of Buddha wearing red robes. On both sides of Buddha, the silhouettes of two figures dressed in long robes with buckles on their shoulders are depicted. One of these figures is shown in the act of bowing to Buddha. Traces of once-painted wall paintings can also be seen on the eastern wall of the shrine. Clay fragments from the interior of the room bear images of various people's faces. On one of the clay fragments measuring 60x80 cm, there is an image of two men, their faces turned toward Buddha. Based on these two figures, who are shown worshiping the Bactrian Buddha, it can be concluded that Buddha was an object of worship. In this room, there are many gypsum fragments of statues.

The temple courtyard is in the shape of a rectangular polygon, measuring 33x20 meters, with doors to the monks' rooms on all four sides. Inside the courtyard is a large continuous hall, with its walls adorned with colorful paintings, preserved only on its lower parts. Along this hall is a stupa. In the northwest part of the courtyard is a small trapezoidal pond made from marble fragments. There is a special opening at the bottom of this pond in the shape of a lion's mouth. The water in such ponds was clean and meant for drinking. This lion dates back to the era of Kushan art and represents a strong and powerful Buddha. The second part of the religious complex was a monastery connected to the temple by a door leading to the courtyard. The rooms on the monastery's grounds housed monks and students, while dormitories for pilgrims were located in classrooms and offices. Special shelves were constructed on the room walls to hold lanterns with wicks. Along the walls of certain rooms, pedestals were built for placing Buddha statues. Thus, monks, their students, and pilgrims offered their prayers in the central part of the temple when religious events were temporarily paused.

== Location ==
It is located in the northwest of the ruins of the Old Termiz city near the city of Termiz, 1 km northeast of the complex of Buddhist structures of Karatepa, in the neighborhood of Al-Hakim al-Tirmidhi, Termiz district.

== Destruction ==
Fayoztepa became a ruin as a result of the invasion attacks of the Iranian Sassanids. In the 1st half of the 5th - 6th centuries, the ruins of the temple were used by the Ephthalites as a hut. During the Arab invasion, Fayaztepa was completely destroyed, and later it was buried under shifting sands.

== Site ==
The site of Fayaz Tepe is located a few hundred meters from Kara Tepe, not far from the city of Termez.

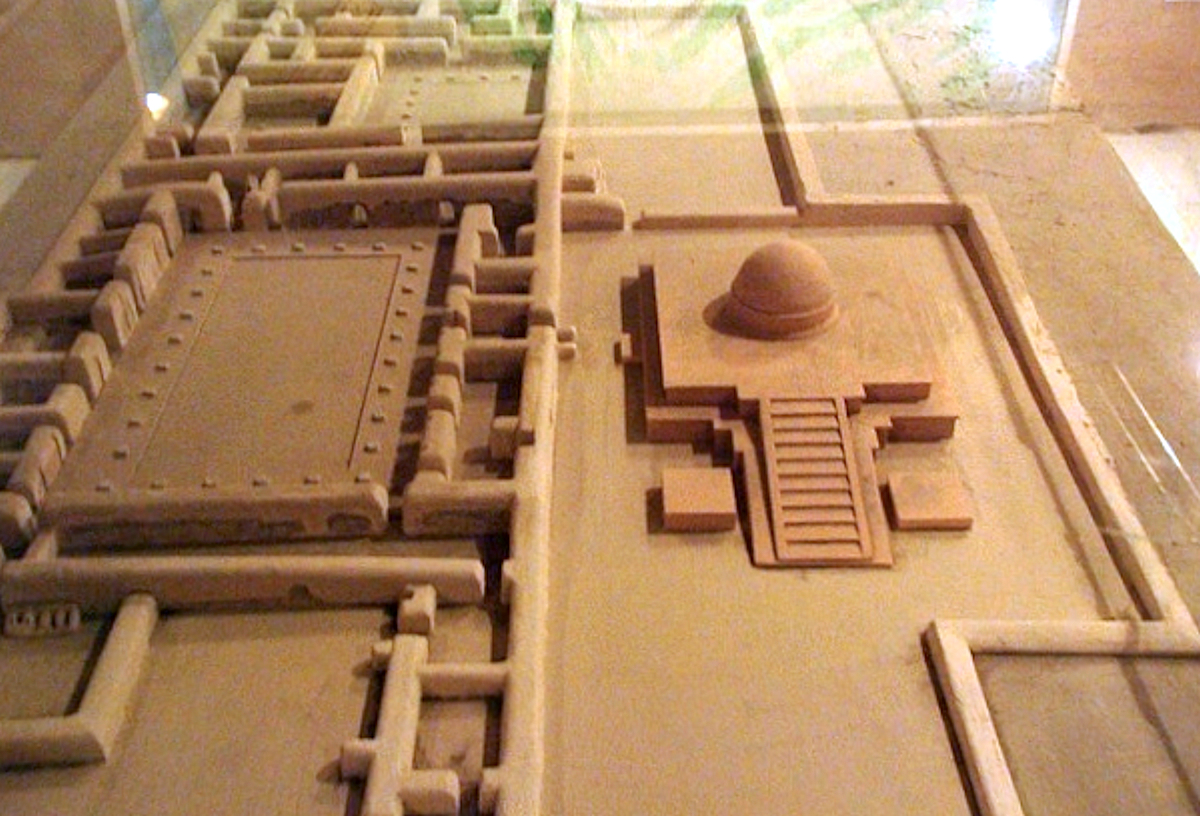
Model of the Stupa and monastery

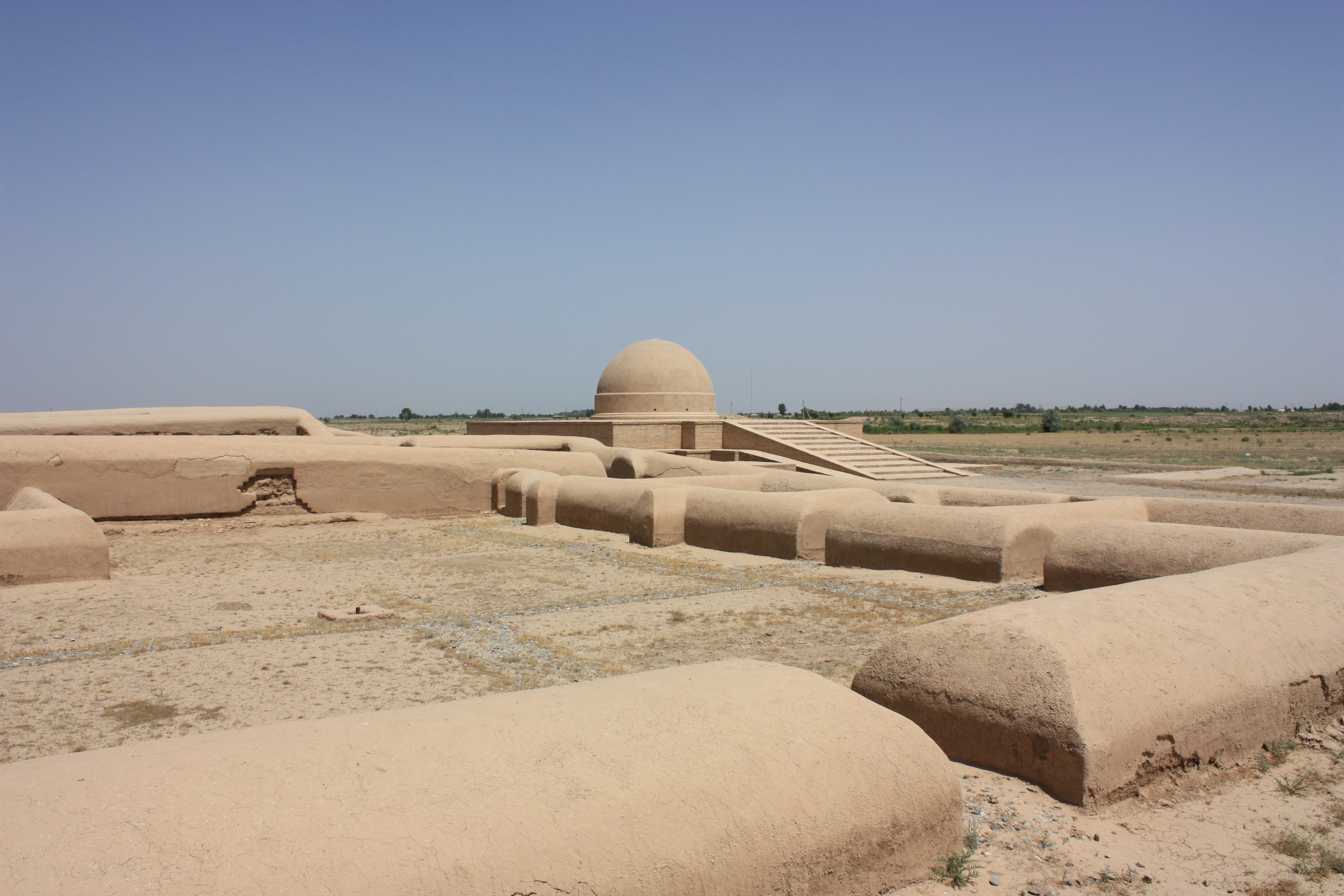
Site of Fayaz Tepe

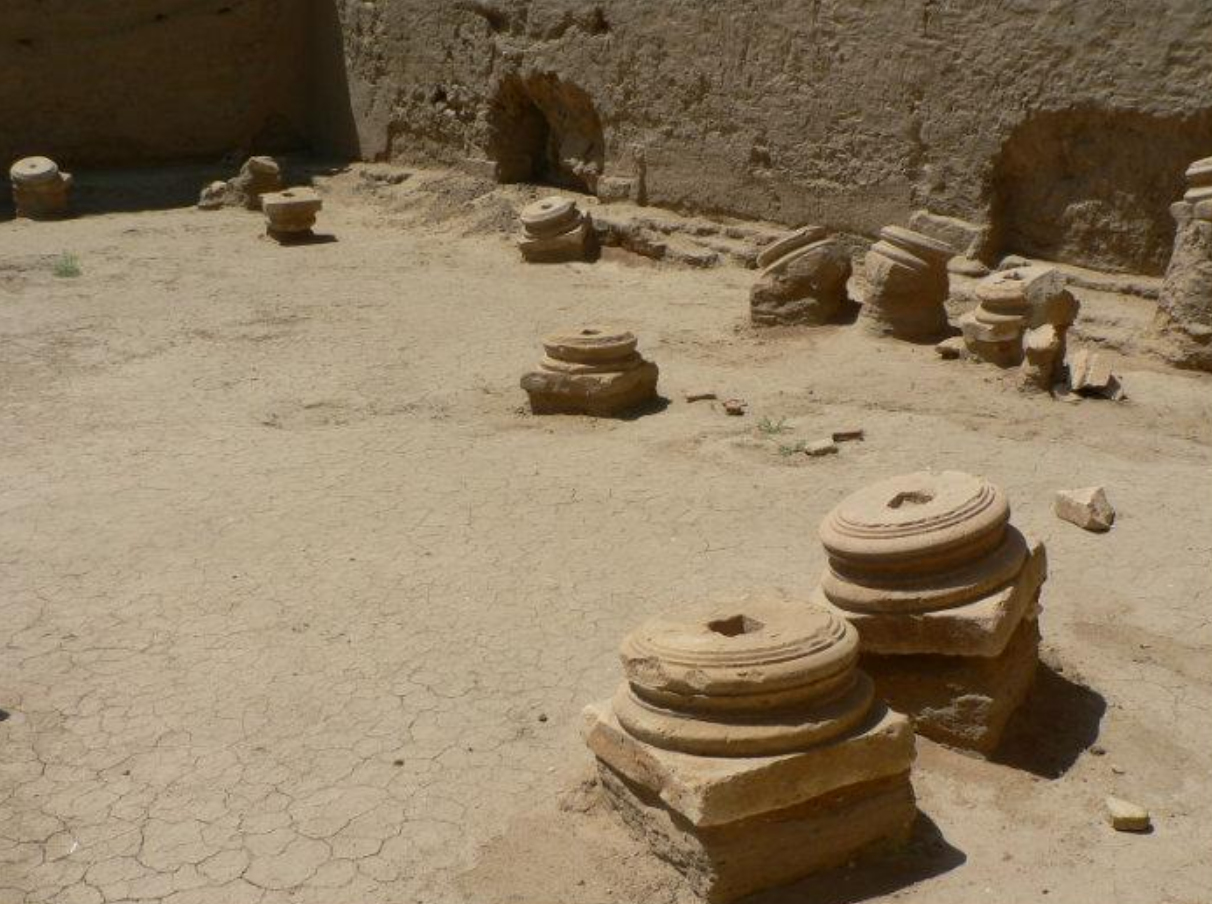
Fayaz Tepe columns

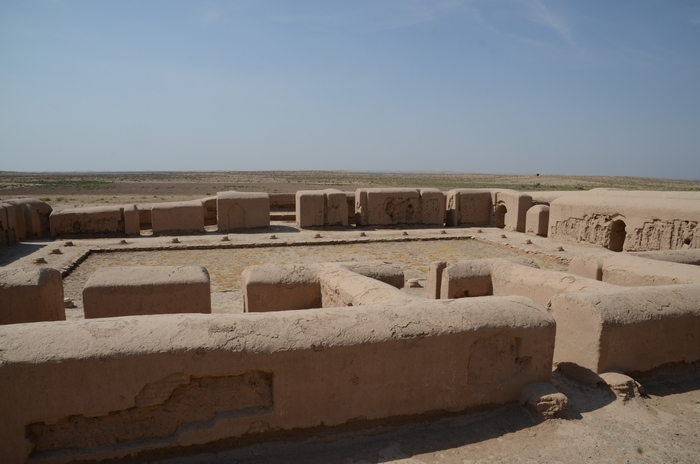
Fayaz Tepe, Monastery, Court

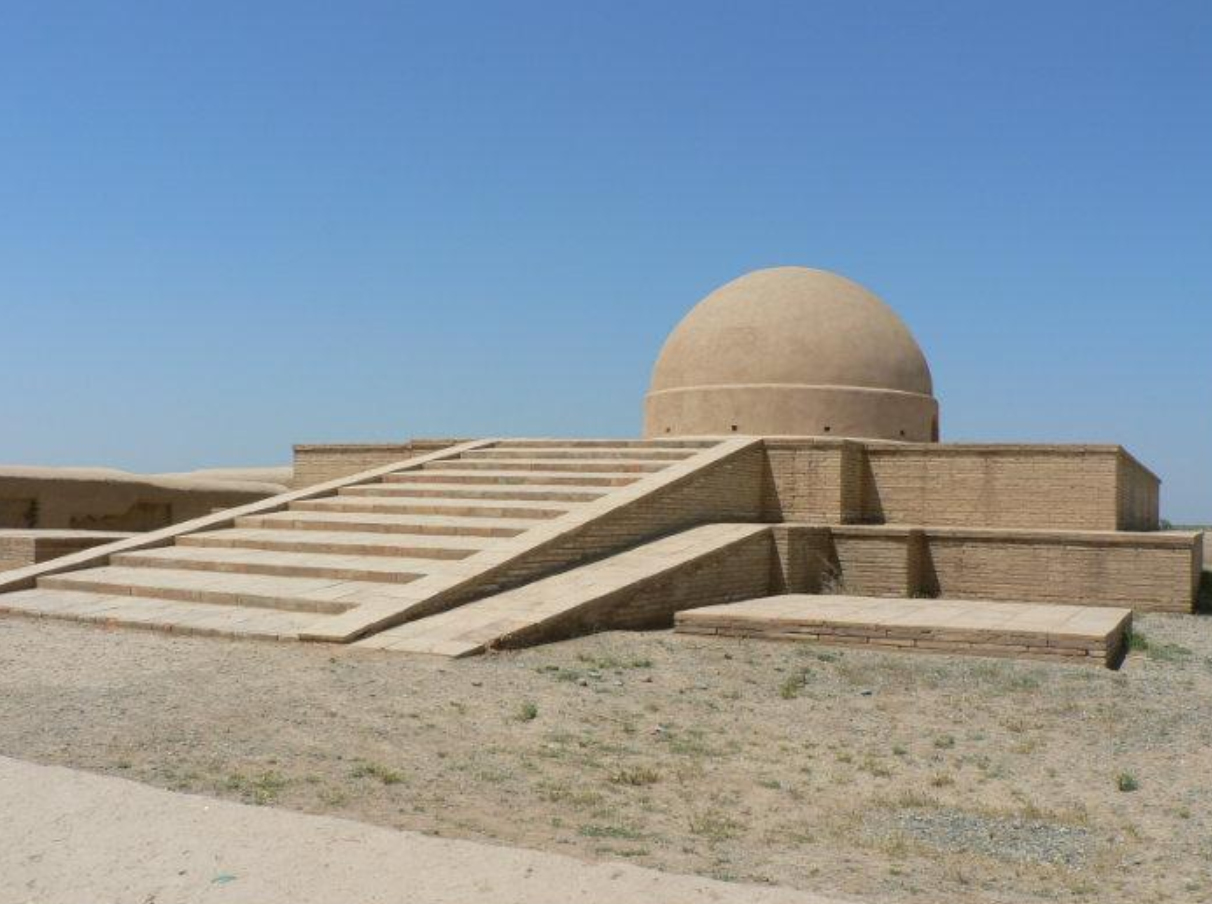
Fayaz Tepe, Stupa

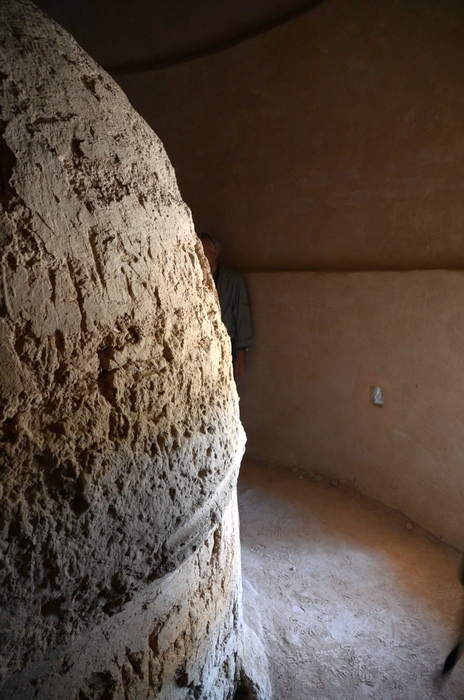
Fayaz Tepe, Stupa, inside

== Artefacts ==
From the site were recovered numerous Buddhist frescoes and reliefs, now mostly located in the State Museum of History of Uzbekistan in Tashkent. A famous niche showing the Buddha and two monks is dated to the 3rd-4th century CE. An inscription has been found recently, which mentions the Kushan king Huvishka.

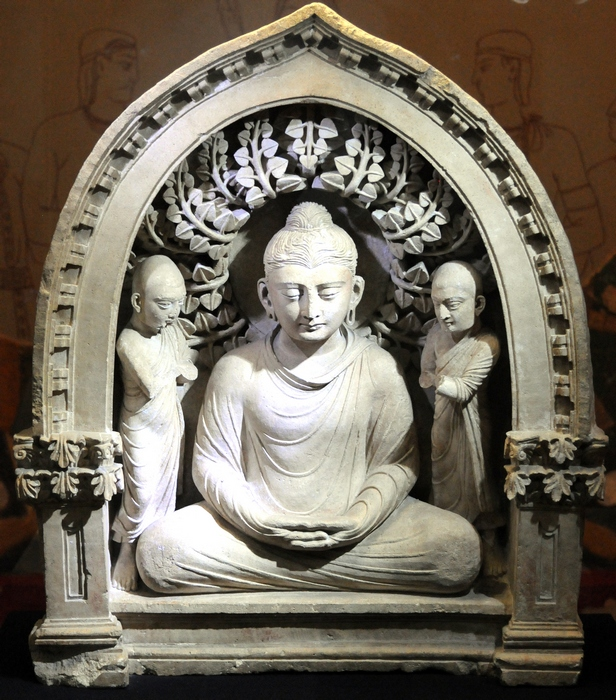
Niche with the Buddha and two monks, 3rd-4th century CE.

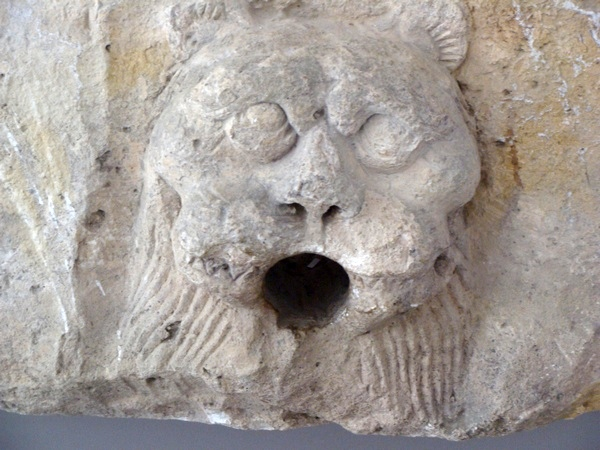

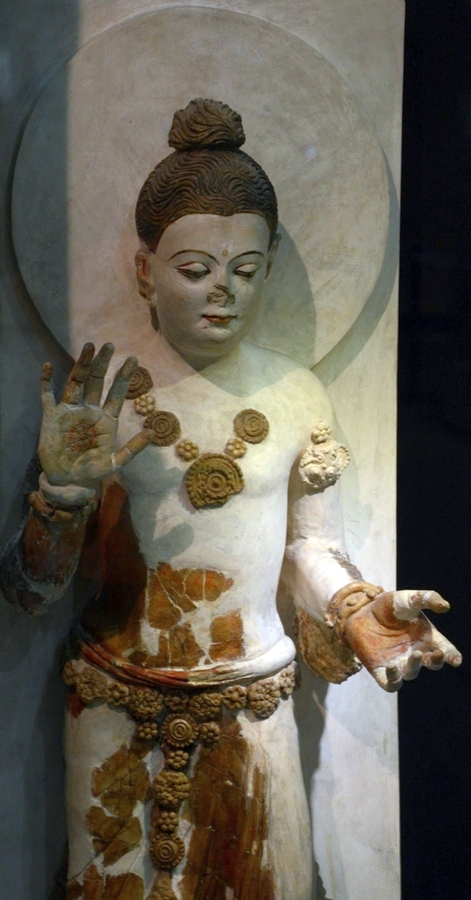

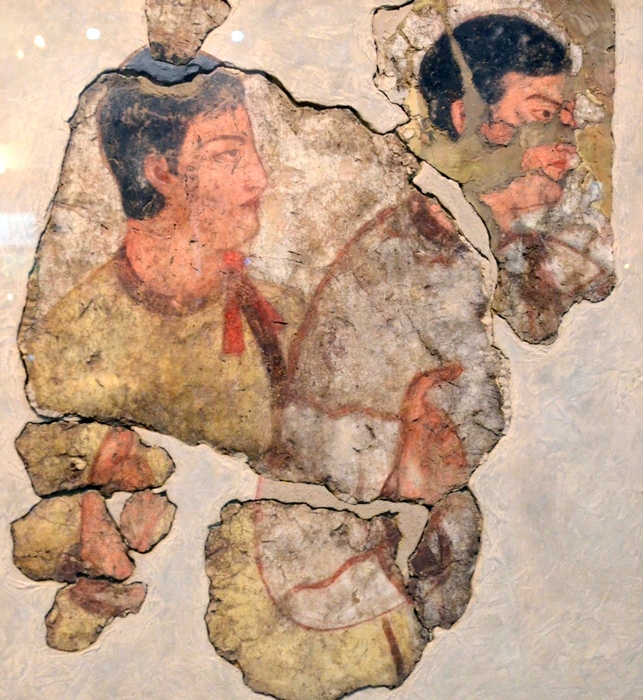
A group of courtiers.

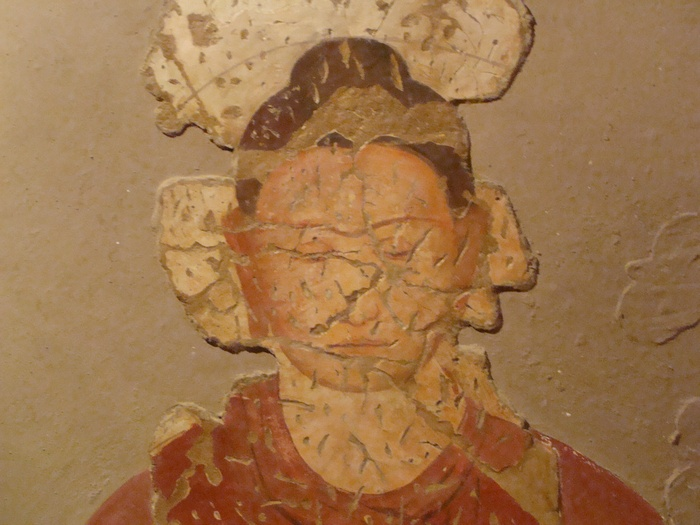
Seated Buddha

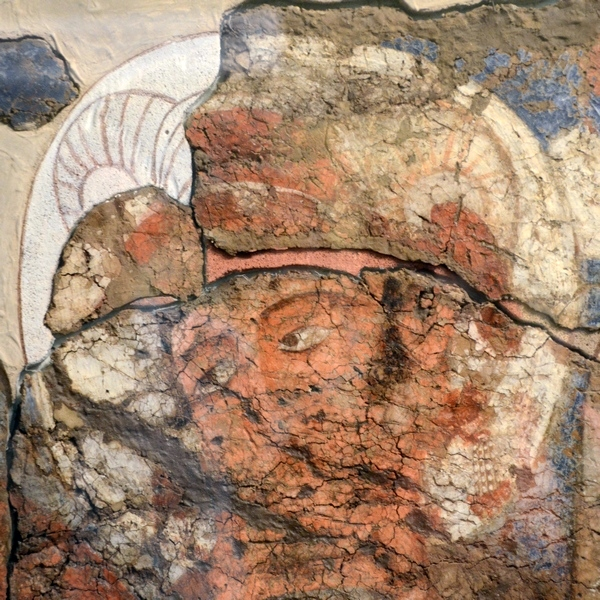
A devotee with horns, possibly a Kushano-Sasanian motif.

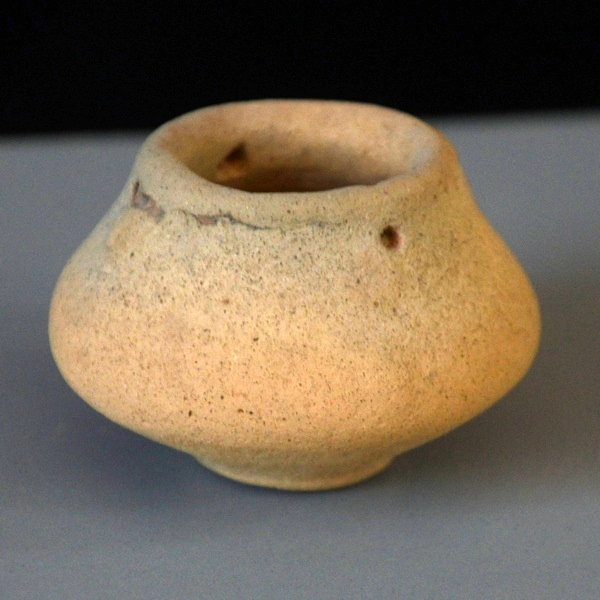
Fayaz Tepe, Miniature vessel

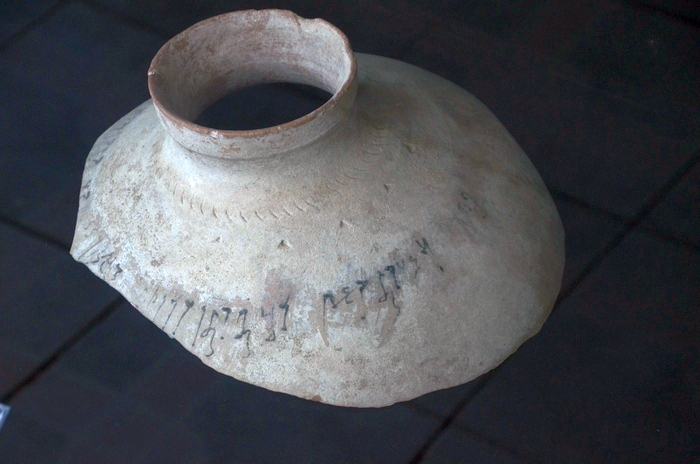
Fayaz Tepe, Pottery with an Indian inscription

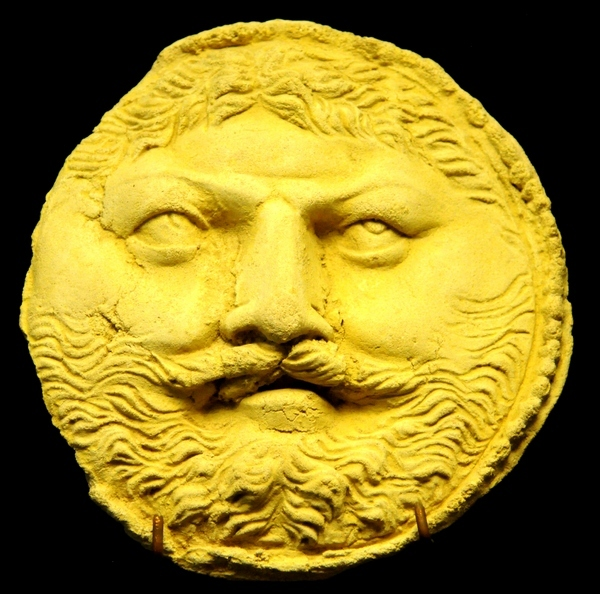
Fayaz Tepe, Sun god

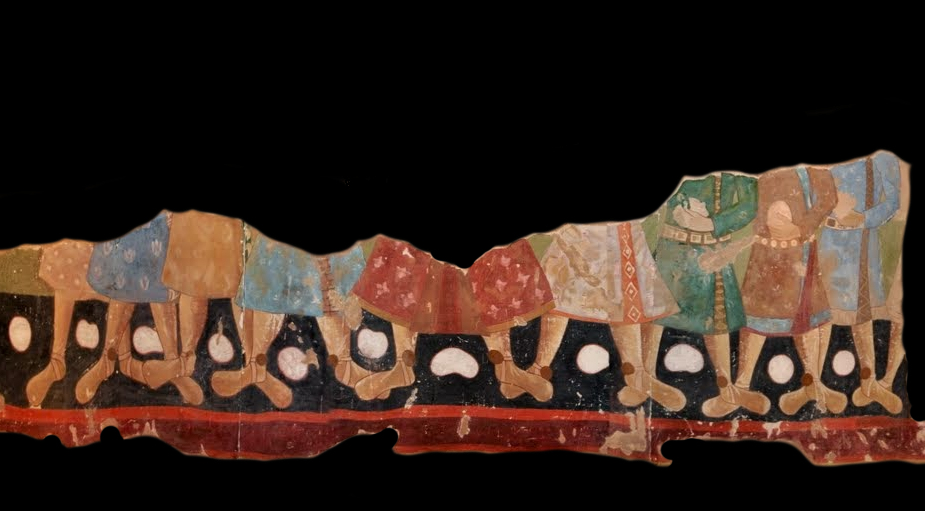
Fayaz Tepe mural (men in caftan and boots)

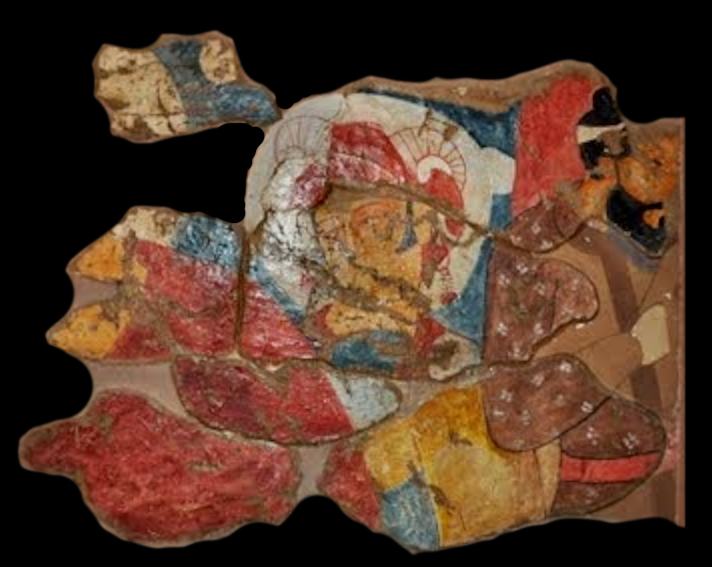
Fayaz Tepe mural of deity with horns

== See also ==
- Kara Tepe
- Dalverzin Tepe
- Khalchayan
- Surkh Kotal
