= Rishikas =

Ancient Kingdom of Central Asia and South Asia

The Rishikas (also Rshika and Ṛṣika) was an ancient kingdom of Central Asia and South Asia, who are mentioned in Hindu and Sanskrit literary texts, including the Mahabharata, the Ramayana, the Brhat-Samhita, the Markendeya Purana and Patanjali's Mahabhashya.

Some historians believe the Rishikas were a part of, or synonymous with, the Kambojas. However, the Mahabharata not only suggests a distinction, but also adds an internal division – sub-divisions within the Rishikas known as the Uttara ("northern") and the Parama ("supreme") .

Classical literary texts state that the Rishikas were neighbors of the Parama Kambojas and the Lohas in Saka-dvipa ("Sakaland") (most likely Transoxiana).

According to traditional accounts, during the 2nd century BCE a subgroup of Rishikas migrated to southwestern India and settled there, crossing Afghanistan, Balochistan, Sindhu and Sovira.

== Historical identity ==
=== Kamboja–Rishika connection ===
Sanskrit scholar Ishwa Mishra believes that the Rishikas were synonymous with the Parama Kambojas. V. S. Aggarwala also relates the Parama Kambojas of the Pamir Mountains to the Rishikas of the Mahabharata, located in Shakdvipa. According to B. N. Puri, the Kambojas were a branch of the Yuezhis. Similarly, Moti Chandra sees a close ethnic connection between the Kambojas and the Tukhar. And other scholars believe that the Kambojas were a branch of the Yuezhi.

The Sabhaparava of the Mahabharata describes the Lohas, Kambojas and Rishikas as neighboring tribes west of the Himalayas. The Adiparva of the Mahabharata compares the Kambojas and the Rishikas, describing them both as "despised" people. The Kambojan king Chandravarma is described as an incarnation of Chandra, a Daitya, and the sage, Rishika ("from the Rishika tribe"), is described as an incarnation of Danva Arka.

In one version of the Mahabharata Chandravarma is a Rishikan, rather than a Kambojan, king. The Kambojas and Rishikas appear side-by-side in a verse. In the Udyogaparava of the Mahabharata, the Kambojas and Rishikas are described as one people (Kambojarishika).

A scholarly class of people is implied, according to some authorities, by the name "Rishika" in the Matsya and Vayu Puranas. The Kambojas, in the Dronaparava section of the Mahabharata, are also described as a scholarly people:

=== Other Evidences ===
Some scholars have proposed that the Rishikas are the Yuezhi of ancient Chinese sources, or the Asii cited by the ancient Greeks. J. C. Vidyalankar believes that the Rishikas are the Kushans in general (or perhaps only the dynasty founded by Kanishka).

The name "Asii" (or "Asioi") mentioned by Strabo, according to one view, alludes to their connections with horses (asva or assa). Based on the earlier information from Megasthenes' (350-290 BC) Indica, Pliny the Elder (23–79 AD) mentions Osii (Orsi) / Asoi / Aseni, Taxillae and Peucolaitae as Indian peoples living in the upper Indus valley south of the Hindu Kush. The Taxillae and Peucolaitae are Gandharans of the Indian traditions while the Asoi, Osii/Orsi and Aseni appear yet other variants of the Assaceni (Aspasioi) and Assacani (Assakenoi)—the Asvayana and Asvakayana of Pāṇini and Katyayana). The Aspasios and Assakenois were notable Kamboja groups engaged in horse culture.

== Ancient Indian literary references ==
=== Mahabharata and Ramayana ===
The Rishikas fought in the war described in the Mahabharata. The allied Lohan, Parama-Kamboja, northern and Parama Rishika tribes fought with Arjuna of the Pandavaduring their Digvijay expedition against the tribes of Uttarapatha. The Kishikindha Kanda of the Ramayana also refers to northern Rishikas.

=== Matsya Purana ===
According to Matsya Purana the Rishikas were descendants of the Rishis, or inspired poets.

=== Rishikas in southwestern India ===
Verses in Karanaparava and Bhishmaparava of the Mahabharata refer to Rishikas in Dakshinapatha as a Janapada near Mahajanapada. The Kishikindha Kanda of Valmiki's Ramayana refers to this second branch of the Rishikas, placing them in Dakshinapatha near the Vidarbhas. The Markandeya Purana also attests to the Rishikas of the Dakshinapatha.

Varāhamihira identifies Rishikas in Dakshinapatha in the Brhat Samhita. Brhat Samhita and Markendeya Purana identify Kamboja and Pahlava settlements in southwestern India.

Evidence from Udyogaparava of the Mahabharata associates the Rishikas with the Kambojas, Shakas and Pahlavas near the Anupa region (Anupadesha):

Shakanam Pahlavana.n cha Daradanam cha ye nripah
Kamboja Rishika ye cha pashchim anupakash cha ye (5.5.15)

"The kings of the Shakas, Pahlavas, Daradas and the Kamboja Rishikas live in the west in Anupadesa, or the seacoast regions."

The Daradas in the verse above appear to be a copyist's mistake, since the Paradas, not the Daradas, are associated with the military confederation of the Sakas, Kambojas and Pahlavas (Pānca-ganah or "five hordes" of Kshatriyas in the Puranic texts, for instance).

== See also ==
- Uttara Madras
- Kuru kingdom
- Uttara Kurus
