= Mleccha =

Ancient Sanskrit term referring to foreigner to Vedic mainland and Vedic tribes

Mleccha (Sanskrit: म्लेच्छ, romanized: mlecchá) is a Sanskrit term referring to those of an incomprehensible speech, foreigners or invaders deemed distinct and separate from the Vedic tribes.In Vedic Brahmanical discourse, the term Mleccha refers to foreigners (anāryans) who are considered outside the pale of Vedic dharma. Christians, Muslims, and other perceived outsiders are classified within the Mleccha category.

Mleccha was traditionally applied to denote foreigners or outsiders who did not belong to the Vedic cultural milieu, regardless of their race or skin colour. These individuals were considered outside the varna system and the ritualistic framework of Vedic Tribal society.

Historical sources identify various groups as mlecchas, including the Śākas, Huns, Chinese, Yavanas, Kambojas, Pahlavas, Bahlikas, Rishikas, and Daradas. Other groups designated as mlecchas include the Andhras, Barbaras, Kiratas, Paradas, Parasikas, Pulindas, Gurjaras, Gonds, Kushanas, Tusharas, Nishadas, Turks, Mongols, Romans, Baloch and Arabs.

== Etymology ==
The Sanskrit word mleccha lacks a standard Indo-European etymology and has no counterpart in Iranian languages. However, it has cognates in Middle Indo-Aryan languages: Pali milakkha, and Prakrit mliccha, from the latter of which originate Sindhi milis, Punjabi milēch, Kashmiri brichun (weep or lament), Western Pahari mēlēch (dirty), Odia mḷēccha, Bengali myalōch (dirty). The Sanskrit word occurs as a verb mlecchati for the first time in the later Vedic text Śathapatha‐Brāhmaṇa dated to around 700 BC. It is taken to mean to speak indistinctly or barbarously. Brahmins are prohibited from speaking in this fashion.

As mleccha does not have an Indo-European etymology, scholars infer that it must have been a self-designation used by a non-Aryan people in India. Based on the geographic references to the Mleccha deśa (Mleccha country) to the west, the term is identified with the Indus people, whose land is known from the Sumerian texts as Meluḫḫa. (Note: See Southworth's etymological derivation of Tamil.)

Pali, the older Prakrit used by Theravada Buddhism, uses the term milakkha. It also employs milakkhu, a borrowing from a Dramatic Prakrit.

== Language ==
Some explanations of the name mleccha suggest that the word was derived from the Indo-Aryan perception of the speech of the indigenous peoples. Namely, mlech was a word that meant 'to speak indistinctly'. As such, some suggest that the Indo-Aryans used an onomatopoeic sound to imitate the harshness of an alien tongue and to indicate incomprehension, thus coming up with mleccha.

Early Indo-Aryans spoke Sanskrit, which evolved into the various local modern Sanskrit-derived languages. Sanskrit was believed to include all the sounds necessary for communication. Early Indo-Aryans would therefore dismiss other languages as foreign tongue mleccha bhasha. As the Sanskrit word itself suggests, mlecchas were those whose speech was alien. Correct speech was a crucial component of being able to take part in the appropriate yajñas (religious rituals and sacrifices). Thus, without correct speech, one could not hope to practice correct religion, either.

The notion of being Arya suggested a knowledge of Sanskrit in order to effectively perform ritual hymns; thus suggesting the importance of language. Parasher discusses the importance of knowing the correct speech in order to perform sacrifice and ritual in the religion of the brahmanas. Parasher continued, "The best experts of the sacrificial art were undoubtedly the various families of the Brahmins who, placed in a hierarchy within the Indo-Aryan social system, became the upholders of pure and best speech".

Historians note that early Indo-Aryans believed Sanskrit to be the superior language over all other forms of speech. As such, mleccha or barbarian speech was said to have meant any of the following:

1. a language which was not necessarily alien, but the speech of the person or persons was improper because it was either hostile or vulgar
2. a language, and here most probably Sanskrit, that was mispronounced and, thereby, incomprehensible
3. finally, any foreign tongue, which was naturally incomprehensible.

== Territory ==
Historians have stated that the notion of foreigners in ancient India – those living outside of the Indian subcontinent – was often accompanied by the idea that one was a barbarian. Still, it seemed that groups who did not come from outside of these areas, as well as foreigners, were designated by the term mleccha, which carried with it a barbarian connotation.

Thus another distinction that was made between the mlecchas and non-mlecchas was area of habitation. Though they were considered a marginal group, the area characterize as the mleccha-desa (the natural border that separated their lands from that of the Aryans) was never permanent. Instead, it was defined by the changing ideas about the Āryāvarta. Parasher noted that the only consistent areas dubbed as mleccha desa were those regions inhabited by primitive tribes who for long periods of time did not come under the sway of the Vedic, Buddhist or Jain influence.

Though the area of the Aryas expanded with time, the notion that was held over all of the land was that of purity. As Vedic literature refers only to the places and territories that were familiar to the Indo-Aryans, these lands eventually became part of the Āryāvarta. Parasher thus indicates that the Āryāvarta was designated as the region where the River Sarasvati disappears is the Patiala district in Punjab. The Pariyatra Mountains belong to the Vindhya Range, probably the hills of Malwa. The Kalakavana is identified with a tract somewhere near Prayag. Still, other interpretations of the Āryāvarta refer to those areas where the black antelope roams, for these areas are fit for the performance of sacrifice. Early Vedic literature focused on defining the area of habitation of the Aryas for this land was considered pure; yet there is no actual reference to the mleccha country or behavior. Wherever the territory, though, the implications of naming such lands as the Āryāvarta is that any lands excluded from that area were considered impure.

Further, there is evidence that Indians of the Vedic period actually had contact with people outside of the Indian subcontinent, namely the Persians. The Achaemenid Persian Empire, which ruled over the Indus River Valley during this time (522–486 BC) was not designated as mleccha, perhaps because they did not interfere with the Brahminical way of life.

Later Vedic literature speaks of the western Anava tribes as mlecchas and occupying northern Punjab, Sindh and eastern Rajputana. The tribes of the north were mlecchas either because they were located on the frontiers such as Gandhara, Kasmira, Kambojas, Khasas and therefore both their speech and culture had become contaminated and differed from that of Āryāvarta, or else, as in the case of southern India, they were once Aryas but having forsaken the Vedic rituals were regarded to mleccha status.

== Cultural behavior ==
The word mleccha emerged as a way for the ancient Indo-Aryans to classify those who did not subscribe to the traditional value system, though the characteristics of this system were ambiguous. In sum, though, the idea was that the mlecchas were peoples who did not conform to what was culturally acceptable.

=== Relations with mlecchas ===
Early writings refer to these foreign peoples as half-civilized, unconverted people who rise or eat at improper times. They stated that monks and nuns should avoid certain areas of habitation because they were unsafe. Namely, that the ignorant populace might beat, harass or rob them under the impression that they were spies from hostile villages. Further, while some of these non-mlecchas, such as those of the Jain faith, had established contact with people of the forest tribes, they were automatically designated as mlecchas. This was the typical attitude of people from the plains who took pride in their norms of settled agricultural and urban lifestyles.

Historians note that there were also systems in place to determine the validity – or purity – of certain customs, which would ultimately be judged by the priest. As such there were intricate rules in place to define purity from impurity, laws of behavior, as well as rituals and customs, in an effort to educate the members of the Brahmanical system. Namely, these advisors took great pains to ensure that peoples of the Brahmanical system did not subscribe to any mleccha customs or rituals.

The Sanskritisation of names was a common feature among both indigenous and foreign mlecchas who slowly tried to move away from their status of mleccha. Very often, in the case of ruling families, it took one to two generations to make a transition. One of the most direct forms of the expression of the Brahmanical ritual purity was the form and type of food which a Brahmin could eat. He was forbidden to accept cooked food from any unclean person. Thus when the Punjab region became a mleccha area conquered by Muslims, the staple food was given a lower place in the food-ranking. By the twelfth century, wheat was described in one lexicon as food of the mlecchas, and rice became the pure cereal. Onions and garlic was also regarded as the food of the mlecchas and therefore prohibited to the priestly intellectual class of Brahmins. Mlecchas drank alcohol, ate cow flesh, which was strictly forbidden to a follower of Hindu orthopraxy, and followed spiritual practices which were foreign to the Indian subcontinent.

== Literature describing the Mleccha ==
In the Mahabharata, some Mleccha warriors are described as having heads completely shaved or half-shaved or covered with matted locks, as being impure in habits, and of crooked faces and noses (Note: A study in attitudes towards outsiders up to AD 600.) They are dwellers of hills and denizens of mountain-caves. Mlecchas were born of the cow (belonging to Vasishtha), of fierce eyes, accomplished in smiting, looking like messengers of Death, and all conversant with the deceptive powers of the Asuras.

Swami Parmeshwaranand states the mleccha tribe was born from the tail of the celestial cow Nandini, kept by Vashishta for sacrificial purposes when there was a fight between Vishvamitra and Vasistha. The Mahabharata gives the following information regarding them:

- Mleccha who sprang up from the tail of the celestial cow Nandini sent the army of Vishvamitra flying in terror.
- Bhagadatta was the king of mlecchas.
- Pandavas, like Bhima, Nakula and Sahadeva once defeated them.
- Karna during his world campaign conquered many mleccha countries.
- The wealth that remained in the yaga-shala of Yudhishthira after the distribution as gifts to Brahmins was taken away by the mlecchas.
- The mlecchas drove angered elephants on the army of the Pandavas.
- This shows mlecchas were against Pandavas.

The term is not attested in the Vedas, but occurs for the first time in the late Vedic text the Shatapatha Brahmana. The Baudhayana sutras define a mleccha as someone who eats beef or indulges in self-contradictory statements or is devoid of righteousness and purity of conduct.

Medieval Hindu literature, such as that of Chaitanya Mahaprabhu, also uses the term to refer to those of larger groups of other religions, especially Muslims. In medieval India, a foreign visitor Al Birūnī (died 1048) noted that foreigners were regarded as unclean or Mleccha and Hindus were forbidden any social or matrimonial contact with them.

According to the Gwalior inscription of his descendant Mihira Bhoja, the Gurjara Pratihara King Nagabhata I repulsed a mleccha invasion. These mlechchhas are identified with the Arab Muslim invaders.

== See also ==
- Barbarian
- Dasa, Dahae
- Gweilo
- Meluhha
- Mlechchha dynasty
- Nemtsy, a name for Germany similarly meaning "mute" or "unable to speak [our language]"
