= Pahlavas =

Ethnic group mentioned in historic Indian texts

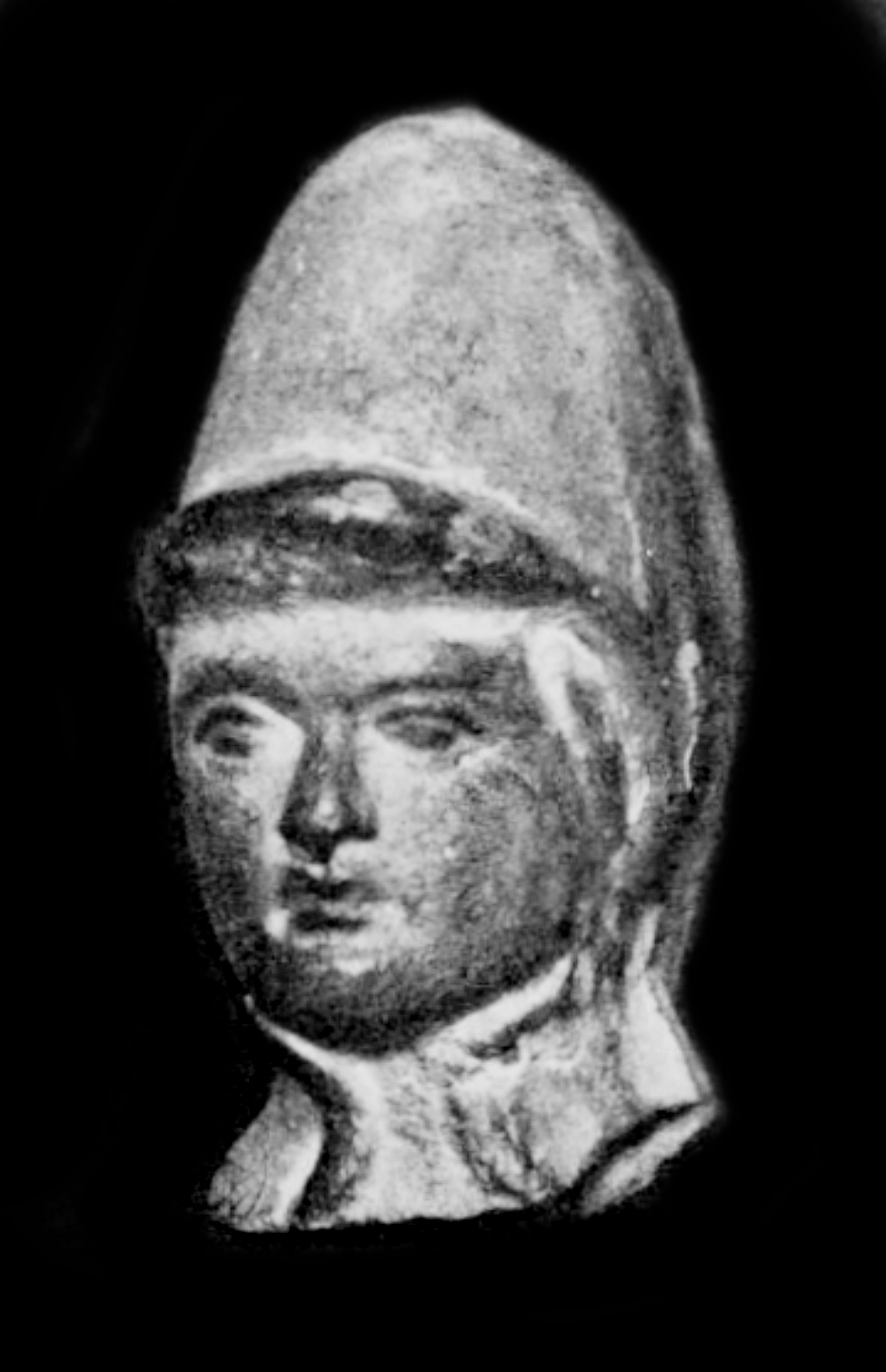
Figure of a foreigner, found in Sarnath. This is a probable member of the West Asian Pahlava or Saka elite in the Gangetic plains during the Mauryan period. (Note: According to Gupta (1980) this is a non-Indian face of a foreigner with a conical hat: "If there are a few faces which are non-Indian, such as one head from Sarnath with conical cap, they are due to the presence of the foreigners, their costumes, tastes and liking for portrait art and not their art styles." Regarding the Masarh lion, Gupta (1980) says: "This particular example of a foreign model gets added support from the male heads of foreigners from Patna city and Sarnath since they also prove beyond doubt that a section of the elite in the Gangetic Basin was of foreign origin. However, as noted earlier, this is an example of the late Mauryan period since this is not the type adopted in any Ashoka pillar. We are, therefore, visualizing a historical situation in India in which the West Asian influence on Indian art was felt more in the late Mauryan than in the early Mauryan period. The term West Asia in this context stands for Iran and Afghanistan, where the Sakas and Pahlavas had their base-camps for eastward movement. The prelude to future inroads of the Indo-Bactrians in India had after all started in the second century B.C. ...")

The Pahlavas are a people mentioned in ancient Indian texts. According to Patrick Carnegy, a Raj-era ethnographer, the 4th-century BCE Vartika of Katyayana mentions the Sakah-Parthavah, demonstrating an awareness of these Saka-Parthians, probably by way of commerce. Knowledge of the Pahlavas is distilled from the literary references in texts like the Manu Smriti, various Puranas, the Ramayana, the Mahabharata, and the Bṛhat Saṃhitā.

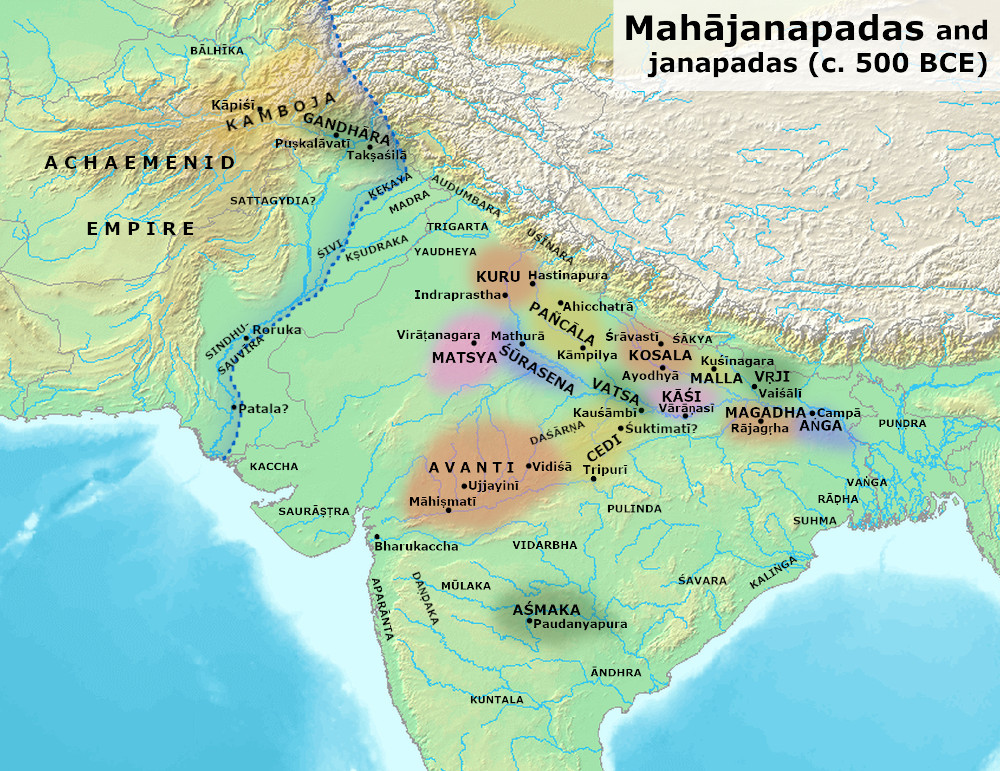
Eastern border of the Achaemenid Empire and the kingdoms and cities of ancient India (circa 500 BCE), around the time of the Achaemenid conquest of the Indus Valley.

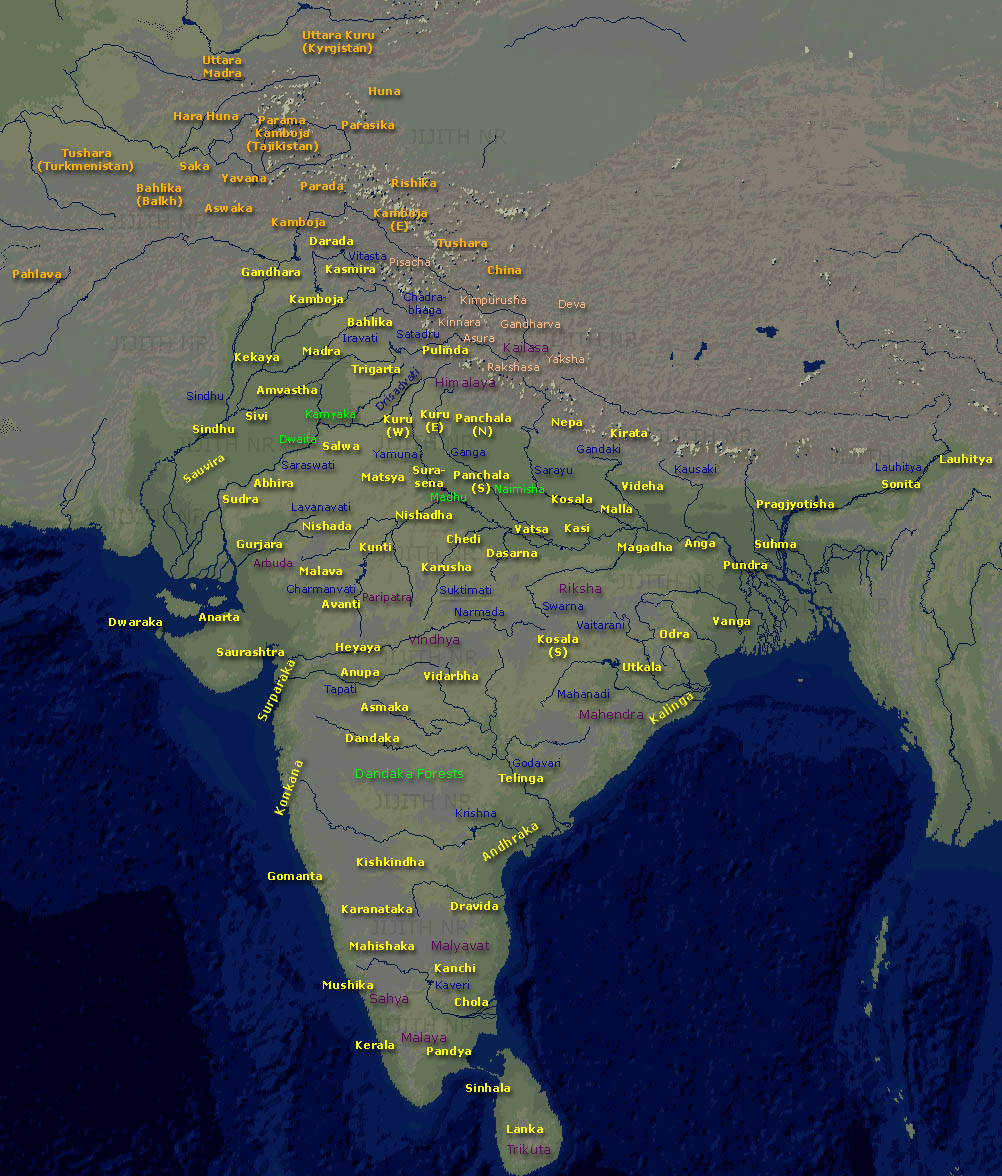
Pahlava kingdom alongside other locations of kingdoms and republics mentioned in the Indian epics or Bharata Khanda

== In Puranic texts ==
Pointed identifications of Pahlavas or Persians with beards are mentioned in the Vāyu Purāṇa and the Viṣṇu Purāṇa (IV, 3).

Pahlavas are referenced in various Puranic texts such as Vayu Purana, the Brahmanda Purana, the Markandeya Purana, the Matsya Purana, and the Vamana Purana.

Kirfel's list of Uttarapatha countries of the Bhuvanakosha locates the Pahlavas along with the Tocharians (or Tusharas), Chinas, Angalaukikas, Barbaras, Kambojas, Daradas, Bahlikas and other countries of the "Udichya" (Sanskrit: "northern") division of ancient India:

ete desha udichyastu
Kambojashchaiva Dardashchaiva Barbarashcha Angaukikah
Chinashchaiva Tusharashcha Pahlavadhayata narah

— From Kirfel's text of Bhuvanakosha

The Vayu Purana, Brahmanda Purana and several other Puranas mention the Pahlavas with the tribes of Uttarapatha or north-west. The 6th-century CE text Markandeya Purana (Note: Markandeya Purana 57.35.) lists the Pahlavas, Kambojas, Daradas, Bahlikas, Barbaras, Tusharas, Paradas, Chinas, Lampakas, as the countries of Udichya division (Uttarapatha). However, the 58th chapter of the Markandeya Purana also refers to yet other settlements of the Pahlavas and the Kambojas and locates them both specifically in the south-west of India as neighbors to the Sindhu, Sauvira and Anarta (north Saurashtra) countries. The 6th-century Bṛhat Saṃhitā of Varāhamihira also locates the Pahlavas and Kamboja kingdoms in south-west India, around Gujarat-Saurashtra.

Puranas like Vayu also state that the Uttarapatha (Udichyas) including the Pahlavas, Paradas, Gandharas, Sakas, Yavanas, Tusharas, Kambojas, Khasas, Lampakas, Madhyadesis, Vindhyas, Aprantas, Dakshinatyas, Dravidas, Pulindas, Simhalas, would be proceeded against and annihilated by Kalki in Kali Yuga. And they are stated to have been annihilated by king Pramiti at the end of Kali age as per Puranic evidence.

According to Vayu Purana and Matsya Purana, the river Chakshu (Oxus or Amu Darya) flowed through the countries of Pahlavas, Tusharas, Lampakas, Paradas and the Sakas. (Note: Vayu Purana I.58.78-83)

=== Pānca Ganahas or five hordes ===
Puranas associate the Pahlavas with the Kambojas, Sakas, Yavanas and Paradas and brands them together as Panca-ganah (five hordes). These five hordes were military allies of the Haihaya or Taljunga Kshatriyas of Yadava line and were chiefly responsible for dethroning king Bahu of Kosala.

Later, king Sagara, son of king Bahu, was able to defeat the Haihayas or Taljungas together with these five-hordes. According to Puranic accounts, king Sagara had divested the Paradas and other members (the Sakas, Yavanas, Kambojas and Pahlavas) of the well-known Pānca-gana of their Kshatriyahood and turned them into the Mlechchas. Before their defeat at the hands of king Sagara, these five-hordes were called Kshatriya-pungava ('foremost among the Kshatriyas').

== In the Ramayana and Mahabharata ==
=== Ramayana ===
The Balakanda of the Ramayana groups the Pahlavas with the Sakas, Kambojas, Yavanas, Mlechhas and the Kiratas and refers to them as military allies of sage Vasishtha against Vedic sage king Vishwamitra. (Note: Ramayana, 55/2-3)

The Kiṣkindhā Kāṇda of the Ramayana associates the Pahlavas with the Yavanas, Shakas, Kambojas, Paradas (Varadas), Rishikas and the Uttarakurus, and locates them all in the trans-Himalayan territories, that is, in the Sakadvipa. (Note: Ramayana § Kiṣkindhā Kāṇda, 43-12.)

Figurines of foreigners in Mathura

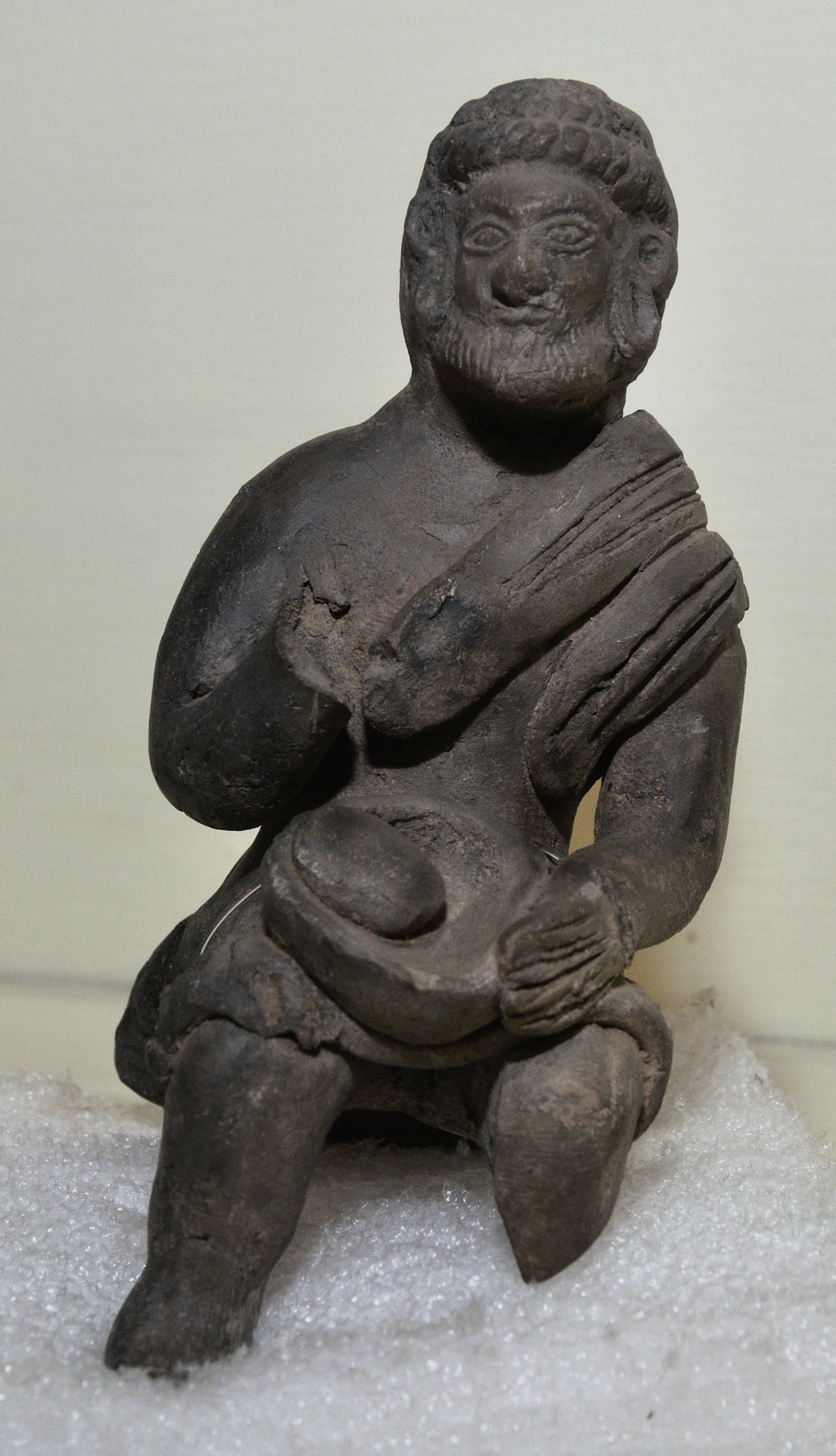
"Ethnic head", Mathura, c. 2nd century BCE. Mathura Museum.

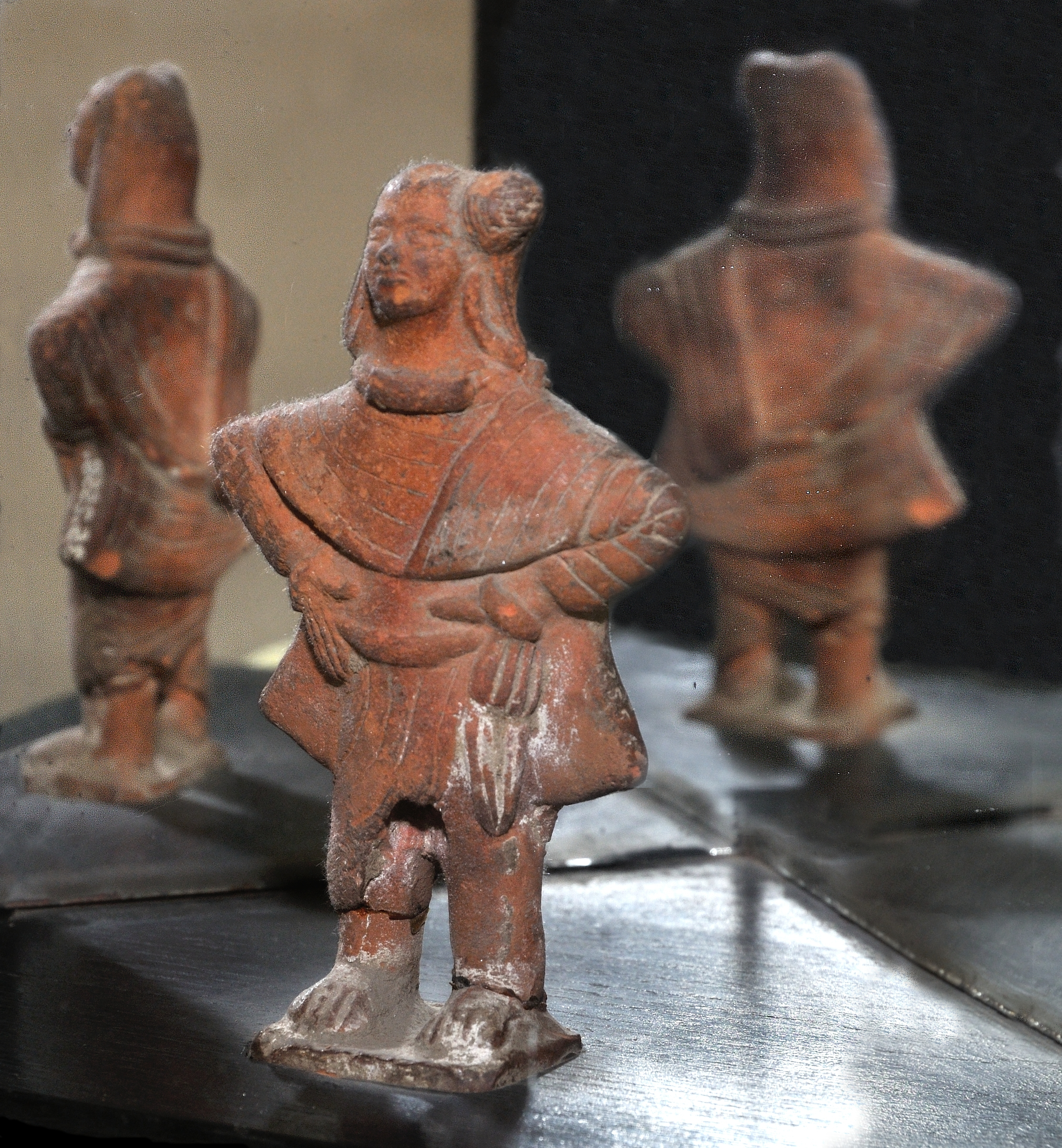
"Persian Nobleman clad in coat dupatta trouser and turban", Mathura, c. 2nd Century BCE. Mathura Museum.

=== Mahabharata ===
==== The Uttarapatha ====
Mahabharata attests that Pandava-putra Nakula had defeated the Pahlavas in the course of his western expedition. The kings of Pahlava were also present at the Rajasuya sacrifice of king Yudhishtra.

The Mahabharata also associates the Pahlavas with the Sakas, Yavanas, Gandharas, Kambojas, Tusharas, Sabaras, Barbaras, and addresses them all as the barbaric tribes of Uttarapatha.

==== The Udyoga-Parva ====
But the Udyoga-Parva of Mahabharata groups the Pahlavas with the Sakas, Paradas and the Kambojas-Rishikas and locates them all in or around Anupa region in western India.

Mahabharata (Note: Mahabharata 5.4.15) reads: These kings of the Shakas, Pahlavas and Daradas (i.e. the Paradas) and the Kamboja Rshikas, these are in the western riverine (Anupa) area.

This epic reference implies that sections of the Pahlavas, Sakas, Paradas, Kambojas were also located in western India near Saurashtra-Maharashtra.

==== The Kurukshetra War ====
The Pahlavas along with the Sakas, Kiratas, Yavanas, amongst others, joined Saradwat's son Kripacharya, the high-souled and mighty bowman, and took up their positions at the northern point of the army. (Note: Mahabharata Bhishma Parva, Ch. 20.) (Note: Since the armies of the Sakas, Yavanas, Tukharas, Khasas, Daradas had fought under the supreme command of Sudakshin Kamboja, it is highly likely that the Pahlavas too fought under Sudakshina Kamboj.)

In the Mahābhārata (XII. 65) the Pahlavas are described as ‘hairy’. The art of that period attests to the prominence of the beard in representations of Persian faces. In a painting of a four-armed Bodhisattva, attired in the guise of a Persian knight and discovered at Dandan Öiliq, the black beard and whiskers are prominently displayed.

== In other texts ==
=== Manusmriti ===
The Manusmriti (Note: Manu-samhita, X.43-44) states that the Pahlavas and several other tribes like the Sakas, Yavanas, Kambojas, Paradas, Daradas, Khasas were originally noble Kshatriyas, but later, due to their non-observance of valorous Kshatriya codes and neglect of chivalry, they had gradually sunken to the status of Mlechchas.

=== The Mudrarakshasa drama ===
The Buddhist drama Mudrarakshasa by Visakhadutta and the Jaina works Parishishtaparvan refer to Chandragupta's alliance with Himalayan king Parvatka. This Himalayan alliance gave Chandragupta a powerful composite army made up of the frontier martial tribes of the Shakas, Kambojas, Yavanas, Pahlavas, Bahlikas, which he utilized to expanded his Mauryan Empire in northern India. (Note: Mudrarakshasa, II)

=== Brihat-Katha-Manjari ===
The Brihat-Katha-Manjari of Kshmendra (Note: Brihat-Katha-Manjari 10/1/285-86) relates that around 400, the Gupta king Vikramaditya (Chandragupta II) had "unburdened the sacred earth of the barbarians" like the Shakas, Mlecchas, Kambojas, Yavanas, Tusharas, Parasikas, Hunas, by annihilating these "unrighteous people" completely.

=== Kavyamimamsa ===
The 10th century Kavyamimamsa (Note: In Chapter 17) of Pt Raj Shekhar still lists the Sakas, Tusharas, Vokanas, Hunas, Kambojas, Bahlikas, Pahlavas, Tangana, Turukshas, together and states them as the tribes located in the Uttarapatha division.

== See also ==
- Achaemenid conquest of the Indus Valley

== Notes ==
=== Sources ===
- Gupta, Swarajya Prakash (1980). The Roots of Indian Art: A Detailed Study of the Formative Period of Indian Art and Architecture, Third and Second Centuries B.C., Mauryan and Late Mauryan. B.R. Publishing Corporation. pp. 88, 122. ISBN 978-0-391-02172-3.
- Sen, Sailendra Nath (1999). Ancient Indian History and Civilization. New Age International. ISBN 9788122411980.
