= Uttara Madra kingdom =

Kingdom in the epic Mahabharata

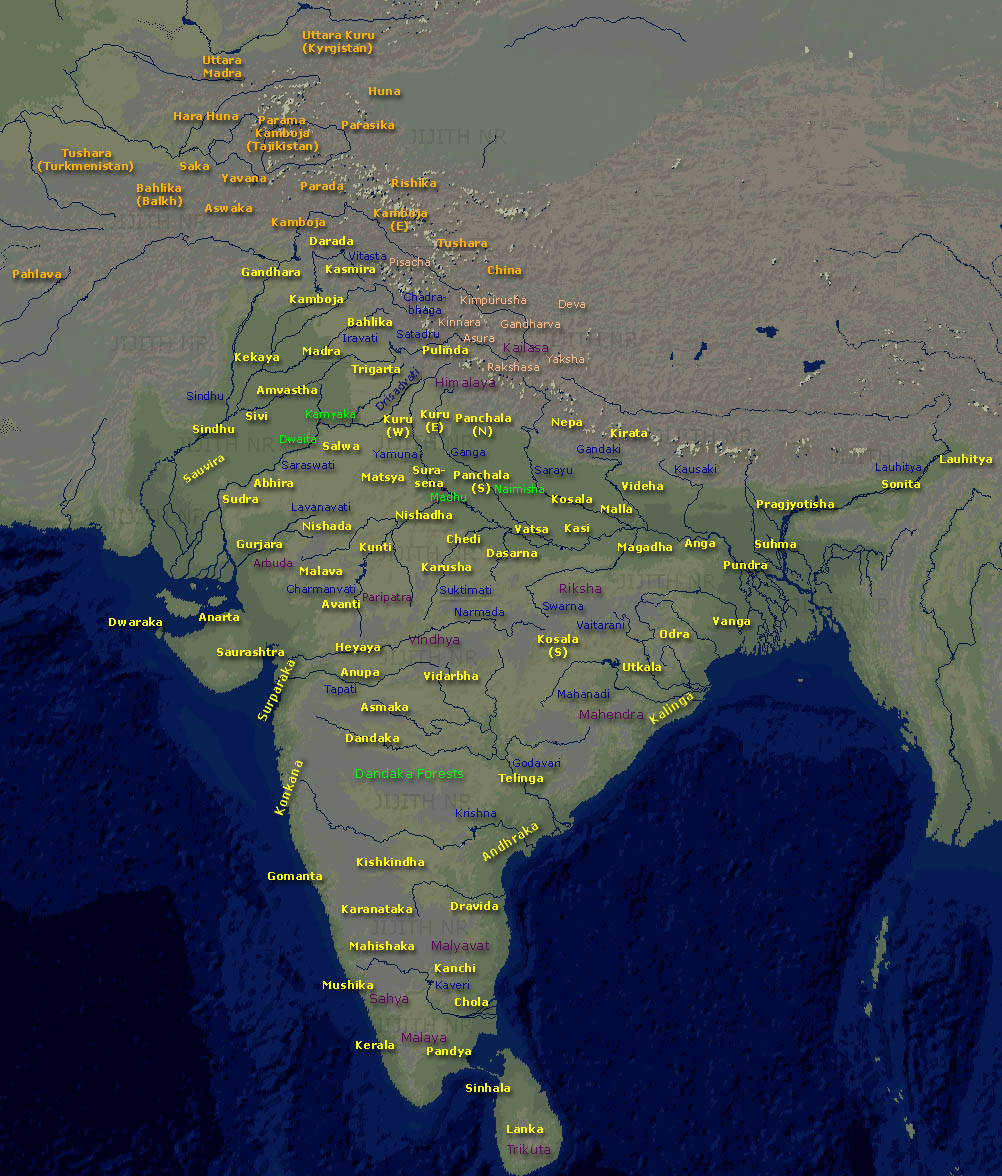
- Uttara Madra kingdom alongside other locations of kingdoms and republics mentioned in the Indian epics or Bharata Khanda
- Government: Monarchy
- Today part of: Tajikistan; Uzbekistan; Kyrgyzstan

Uttara Madra is a kingdom grouped among the western kingdoms in the epic Mahabharata. It is identified to be located to the northwest of eastern Madra with Sagala as its capital.

It was situated along the ancient route called Uttarapatha extending from Vanga kingdom in the eastern sea shore through the Gangetic Plain, Punjab, mountain passes of the Western Mountains, to the city of Balkh in Afghanistan and to the far western countries such as Belarus, Siberian region, Ukraine, Armenia and other Central Asian countries.

Arjuna collected tribute from Uttara Madra during his northern military campaign for Yudhishthira's Rajasuya sacrifice.

== See also ==
- Kingdoms of Ancient India
