= Parada kingdom =

Ancient kingdom in Asia

Pāradas (alternatively Varadas, or Parita) was an Iron Age kingdom described in various ancient and classical Indian texts. The exact location of the kingdom is unknown. The Vayu Purana locates the tribe on the upper course of the Amu Darya (also known as Chaksu) and Syr Darya rivers in Central Asia. The Mahabharata, however, associates the Paradas with the tribes of Uttarapatha, and places them on the Sailoda River in the Xinjiang province of China. Additionally, the Ramayana locates the people in the Himalayas.

It is thought that the Pāradas are connected to the later Paratarajas, an Indo-Parthian dynasty in Pakistan during the 1st-3rd century CE.

== Puranic texts ==
Numerous Puranic texts associate the Parada Kingdom with the Kamboja, Saka, Yavana and Pahlava tribes, and brand them together as Panca-ganah ("five hordes"). These five hordes were military allies of the Haihaya or Taljunga Kshatriyas of the Yadava line, and were chiefly responsible for dethroning King Bahu of Kosala. Later, King Sagara, son of Bahu, was able to defeat the Haihayas or Taljungas together with the five hordes.

King Sagara had divested the Paradas and other members of the Panca-ganah of their noble Kshatriyahood and demoted them to the barbaric caste of Mlechchas, due to their non-observance of sacred Brahmanical codes and neglect of the priestly class. Before their defeat at the hands of King Sagara, these five-hordes were called Kshatriya-pungava ("foremost among the Kshatriyas").

The Vayu Purana state that the Udichya tribes, including the Panca-ganah, the Gandharas, Tusharas, Khasas, Lampakas, Madhyadesis, Vindhyas, Aprantas, Dakshinatyas, Dravidas, Pulindas and Simhalas, would be proceeded against and annihilated by Kalki in Kali Yuga.

== See also ==
- Kingdoms of Ancient India
