= Asii =

Extinct Indo-European tribes

The Asii, Osii, Ossii, Asoi, Asioi, Asini or Aseni were an ancient Indo-European people of Central Asia, during the 2nd and 1st centuries BCE. Known only from Classical Greek and Roman sources, they were one of the peoples held to be responsible for the downfall of the Greco-Bactrian Kingdom. In Greek mythology, they were the children of Iapetus and Asia.

Modern scholars have attempted to identify the Asii with other peoples known from European and Chinese sources including the: Yuezhi, Tocharians, Issedones/Wusun and/or Alans.

== Historical sources ==
The classical European sources relating to the Asii are brief. They sometimes survive only as quotations in other ancient sources, with textual variations that have led to widely varying translations and interpretations.

During the 4th and 3rd Centuries BCE, Megasthenes, who lived in Arachosia and was an ambassador to the Mauryan court in Pataliputra, refers in his work Indika to three tribes with similar and possibly related names, in separate parts of South Asia:

- the Aseni had three cities and their capital was the Bucephala (where Alexander the Great had buried his horse by the same name), the site of which is a matter of controversy;
- the Osii were near neighbours of the Taxillae in the Indus Valley, and;
- the Asoi lived on plains known as Amanda (probably Gandhara), alongside tribes such as the Peucolaitae (Pushkalavati) and Geretae (Panjkorans).

These references by Megasthenes have survived only as citations in other texts.

In the 1st century BCE, Trogus names – in the Historiae Philppicae (of which only the "Prologues" have survived intact) – three tribes involved in the conquest of Bactria: the Asiani, Sacaraucae and Tochari (i.e. the Tukhara of Bactria rather than the so-called Tocharians of the Tarim Basin). The Tochari are reported to have, at some point, become subject to the ruling elite of the Asiani.

According to Trogus, the Sacaraucae had since been destroyed. (In about 200 CE, the Roman historian, Justin (Marcus Junianus Justinus), wrote an epitome or condensation of Trogus's history. The last datable event recorded by Justin is the recovery of the Roman standards captured by the Parthians in 20 BCE, although Trogus' original history may have dealt with events into the first decade of the 1st-century CE.)

Strabo completed his Geography in 23 CE. He mentions four tribes: the Asioi, Pasianoi, Sakaraulai, and Tokharoi.

Pliny the Elder, in about 77–79 CE, makes a brief mention of a people called the Asini in his Naturalis Historia. According to P. H. L. Eggermont:

Pliny mentions ... the Asini, who are reigning in the city of Bucephela. From these three data, 1) the Tacoraei are neighbours of the Besadae/Sosaeadae; 2) the Asini are the neighbours of the Sosaeadae [possibly the Kirata]; [and] 3) The Asiani [sic] are kings of the Thocari, [sic] it follows that the Asini of Pliny's text are identical with the Asiani, who are the kings of the Tocharians. This implies that—at least in the time of Pliny—the Kushāṇas were kings of the region between Jhelam and Indus and that Bucephala was one of their cities. It seems that Pliny availed himself of a recent description of this territory and that Ptolemy knew these data too.

== Possible links to other peoples ==
Many theories have been proposed by historians and other scholars as to their origins, relationships, language, culture, etc., but so far no consensus has emerged.

It is generally accepted that the Asiani mentioned by Trogus were probably identical to the Asii of Strabo.

There is no agreement over whether another tribe mentioned by Strabo, the "Pasiani" were likewise related. Scholars such as W. W. Tarn, Moti Chandra believe that "as Asiani is the (Iranian) adjectival form of Asii, so Pasiani would be the similar adjectival form of, and would imply, a name such as *Pasii or *Pasi". This may suggest that Strabo was referring to a group of Persians (Old Persian Pārsa) or Parsis who had settled in Central Asia. However, scholars such as J. Marquart believe that they were synonymous with the Asiani. In other words, the Asii and the Pasiani were one and the same, and "Pasiani" was a misspelling of Asiani or a variant of the same name. Others suggest that the name is a misspelling of Gasiani, a name which is believed by Chinese scholars to be connected to the Kushan Empire (endonym: Kushano; Chinese: Guishuang 貴霜).

=== Yuezhi & Tocharians ===
Other scholars have proposed, more controversially, that the Asii, Yuezhi and/or Tocharians were closely related.

Alfred von Gutschmid believed that Asii, Pasiani and other names mentioned by Strabo are an attempt to render Yuezhi in Greek. W. W. Tarn first thought that the Asii were probably one part of the Yuezhi, the other being the Tocharians. However, he later expressed doubts as to this position.

The Asii were identical with the Pasiani (Gasiani) and were, therefore, also the Yuezhi.

— J. Markwart. Ērānšahr

The Asii were probably one of three Scythian tribes, whereas the Tochari were probably not, and should be identified with the Yuezhi.

— A. K. Narain The Indo-Greeks

One of the most important sources of information on nomad migration in Central Asia is Justin's Prologue to Pompeius Trogus (prologue to book XLII), which states that 'the Asiani are kings of the Tochari and destroyed the Sacaraucae' (Reges Tocharorum Asiani interiusque Sakaraucarum). It is possible to conclude from this extract that the Asiani and the Tochari were closely related tribes. What is more, it indicates that the 'Asiani' dominated the 'Tochari' (Reges Tocharorum Asiani). We can identify the Asiani with the Kushans (von Gutschmidt 1888; Haloun 1937; Bachhofer 1941; Daffina 1967), one of the leading tribes, which subsequently came to power and created a great empire. It is noteworthy that Justin says that the Tochari were ruled by the Asiani, while the Chinese sources identify them as the largest of the five Yuezhi principalities.

— Kazim Abdullaev, 2007, Nomad Migrations in Central Asia.

By the middle of the 1st Millennium CE, speakers of the so-called Tocharian A language in the Tarim Basin, apparently referred to themselves as Ārśi (pronounced "arshi"; apparently meaning "shining" or "brilliant").

=== Issedones/Wusun ===
Asii or Asiani may simply be a corruption of the name of the Issedones – an Iranian people mentioned by Herodotus – who are frequently identified with the Wusun mentioned in contemporaneous Chinese sources.

Taishan Yu proposes that Asii were "probably" the dominant tribe of a confederacy of four Issedonean tribes "from the time that they had settled in the valleys of the Ili and Chu" who later invaded Sogdiana and Bactria. "This would account for their being called collectively "Issedones" by Herodotus." He also states that the "Issedon Scythia and the Issedon Serica took their names from the Issedones." Yu believes that the Issedones must have migrated to the Ili and Chu valleys, "at the latest towards the end of the 7th century B.C."

It has been suggested that the Wusun may also be identified in Western sources as their name, pronounced then *o-sən or *uo-suən, is not far removed from that of a people known as the Asiani who the writer Pompeius Trogus (1st century BC) informs us were a Scythian tribe.

— J. P. Mallory and Victor H.Mair The Tarim Mummies

=== The Alans ===
A rival theory instead identifies the Asii/Asiani/Asioi with the Alans, an Iranian tribe who migrated from the Eurasian Steppe into Europe during the early Middle Ages.

There is circumstantial evidence for such a link in:

- the name of the Aorsi, who migrated from Central Asia during the late 5th century BCE, to areas north and west of the Caspian Sea, and;
- a state known to 2nd and 1st century BCE Chinese scholars as Yancai and Alanliao, which was located north of the Aral Sea.

The Alans were first documented by European scholars during the 1st century CE, on the Pontic-Caspian Steppe.

Onomastic evidence for the identification of the Asii and Alans is provided by later medieval European scholars and travellers. In the 13th century, Giovanni da Pian del Carpine (Johannes de Plano Carpini) referred to Alani sive Assi ("Alans or Assi") and William of Rubrouck used the name Alani sive Aas ("Alans or Aas"). In the 15th century, Josephus Barbarus reported that the Alans referred to themselves by the name As. The name of the Ossetians, who are descended from the Alans, also has its root in the alternate ethnonym Osi.

However, names similar to Alan (e.g. Aryan and Iron) were clearly used by distantly-related Iranian tribes in very different historical contexts and the identification of the Alans with the Asii requires them to have migrated more than 2,800 kilometres (1,750 miles) in the space of several decades. According to archaeologist Claude Rapin, it is unlikely that the Asii of Bactria migrated further west than Kangju/Sogdia.

== See also ==
- Indo-Scythians
- Rishikas
- Tusharas
