= Tokharistan =

Early medieval region in southern Central Asia

- Maximum extent of the territory of Tokharistan

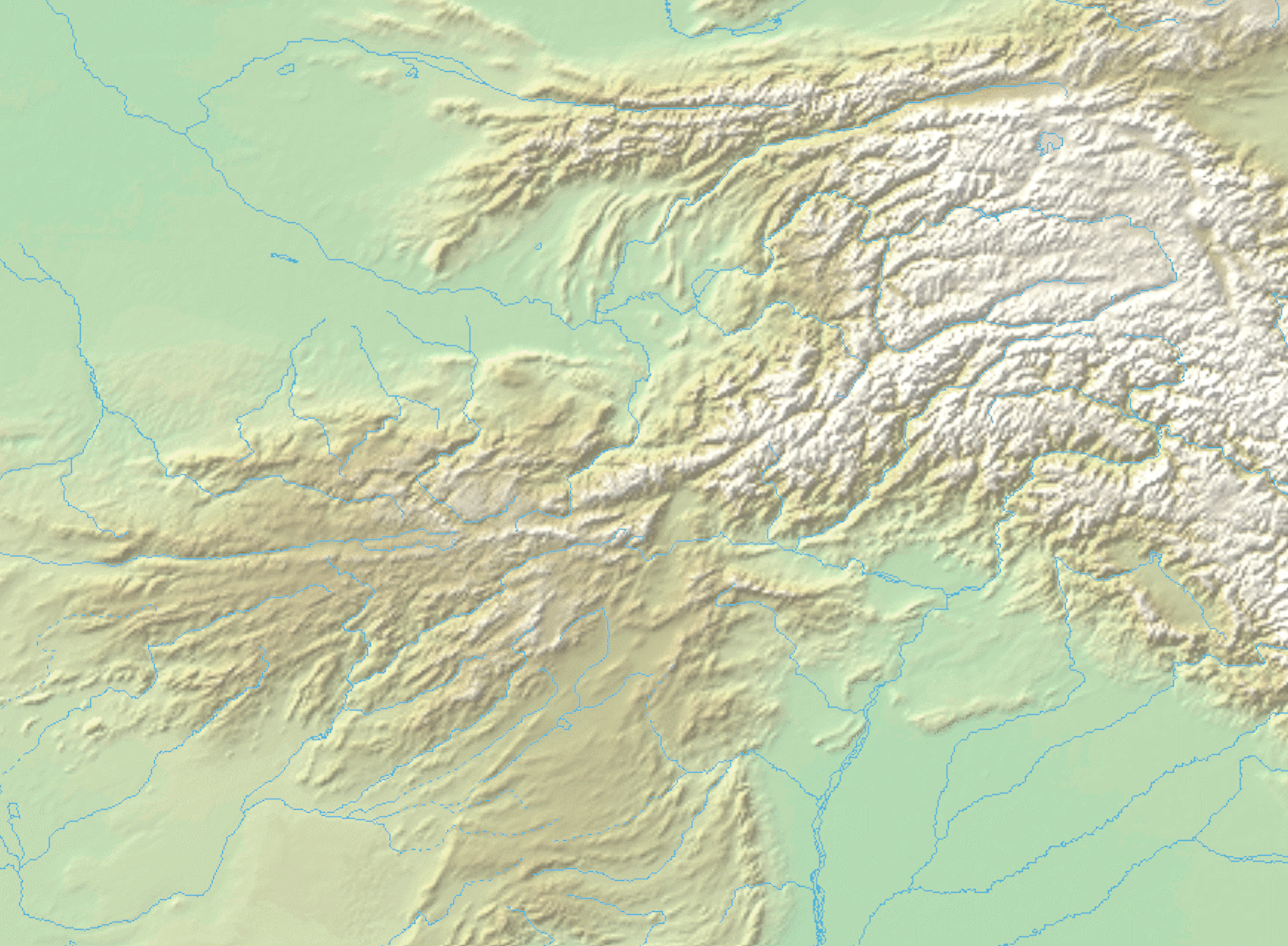
- Balkh, the capital, and other important cities of Tokharistan.
- Capital: Balkh
- Historical era: Early Middle Ages
- Today part of: Afghanistan, Uzbekistan, Tajikistan

Tokharistan (also spelled Tocharistan or Tukharistan; Classical Persian: تخارستان Tukhāristān or طخارستان Ṭukhāristān; lit. 'land of the Tochari') is a historical name used by Islamic sources in the early Middle Ages to refer to the area which was known as Bactria in Ancient Greek sources. The name appears before Islam in Bactrian as Τοχοαραστανο (Toxoarastano) on the 2nd-century silver dish of Nukunzuk and on two 5th-century Bactrian documents, a name which the Tochari gave to the areas they settled but which was likely limited initially to Bactria's eastern parts.

By the 6th century CE, Tokharistan came under rule of the First Turkic Khaganate, and in the 7th and 8th centuries, it was incorporated into the Tang dynasty, administered by the Protectorate General to Pacify the West. Today, Tokharistan is fragmented between Afghanistan, Uzbekistan and Tajikistan.

== Names ==
The name Tokharistan as used in English derives from Classical Persian تخارستان (Tukhāristān) or طخارستان (Ṭukhāristān), lit. 'land of the Tochari', which is cognate with the pre-Islamic Bactrian Τοχοαραστανο (Toxoarastano). These names are derived from the endonym of the Tochari. Tochari itself is a Latin exonym, derived from the Ancient Greek exonym Τόχαροι (Tókharoi). The Tochari are also recorded in Ancient Greek as the Thaguroi.

Most other historical references to the land inhabited by the Tochari are linked to the ethnonym of these people:

- Tokharistan may appear in ancient India sources as the Kingdom of Tushara, to the northwest of the India. "Tushara" is the Sanskrit word for "snowy" "frigid", and is known to have been used to designate the country of Tukhara. In Sanskrit, it became तुखार (Tukhāra).
- The Tochi Valley in Pakistan signifies the Tokhari country and Tokhari settlements of Bactria. Bactrian language inscriptions are also found in Tochi Valley, along with other places in Pakistan.
- The name "Tokhara" appeared in the 4th century CE, in Buddhist texts, such as the Vibhasa-sastra.
- In Tibetan, the name for the region was Thod-kar or Tho-gar.
- The name appears in Chinese as Tukhara (覩货罗 Duhuoluo or 吐火罗 Tuhuoluo). Tokharistan was known in Chinese sources as Tuhuluo (吐呼羅), which is first mentioned during the Northern Wei era (386-534 CE). In the Tang dynasty, the name is transcribed as Tuhuoluo (土豁羅). Other Chinese names are Doushaluo 兜沙羅, Douquluo 兜佉羅 or Duhuoluo 覩貨羅.
- In Khotanese, Ttaugara; in Uyghur, Twghry; in Armenian, T'ukri-k'.

== Ethnic groups ==
Several portraits of ambassadors from the region of Tokharistan are known from the Portraits of Periodical Offering of Liang, originally painted in 526–539 CE. They were at that time under the overlordship of the Hephthalites, who led the embassies to the Southern Liang court in the early 6th century CE.

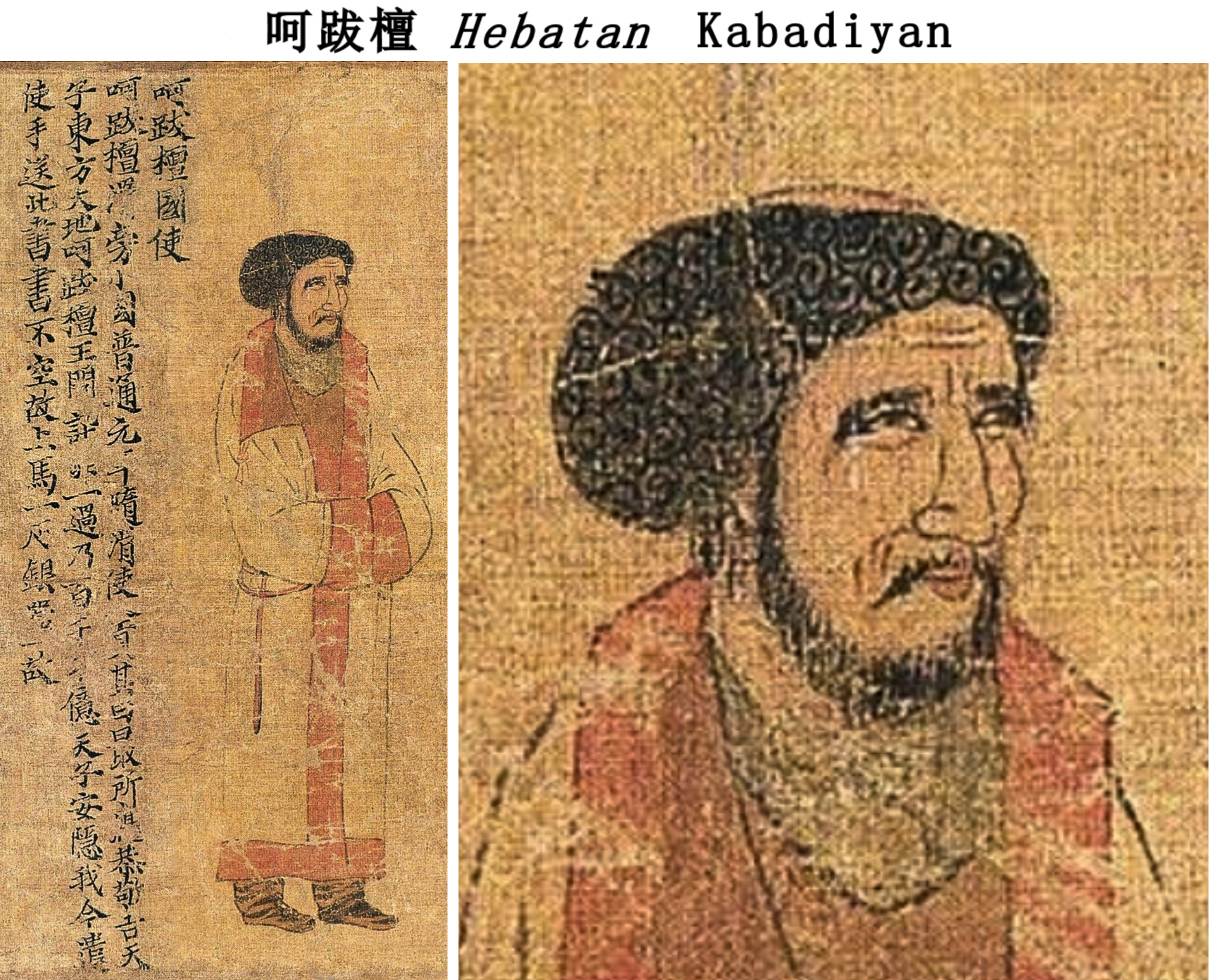
Qubodiyon ambassador to the court of Emperor Yuan of Liang in his capital Jingzhou in 516–520 CE, with explanatory text. Portraits of Periodical Offering of Liang, 11th century Song copy. The ambassador accompanied the Hephthalites to China.

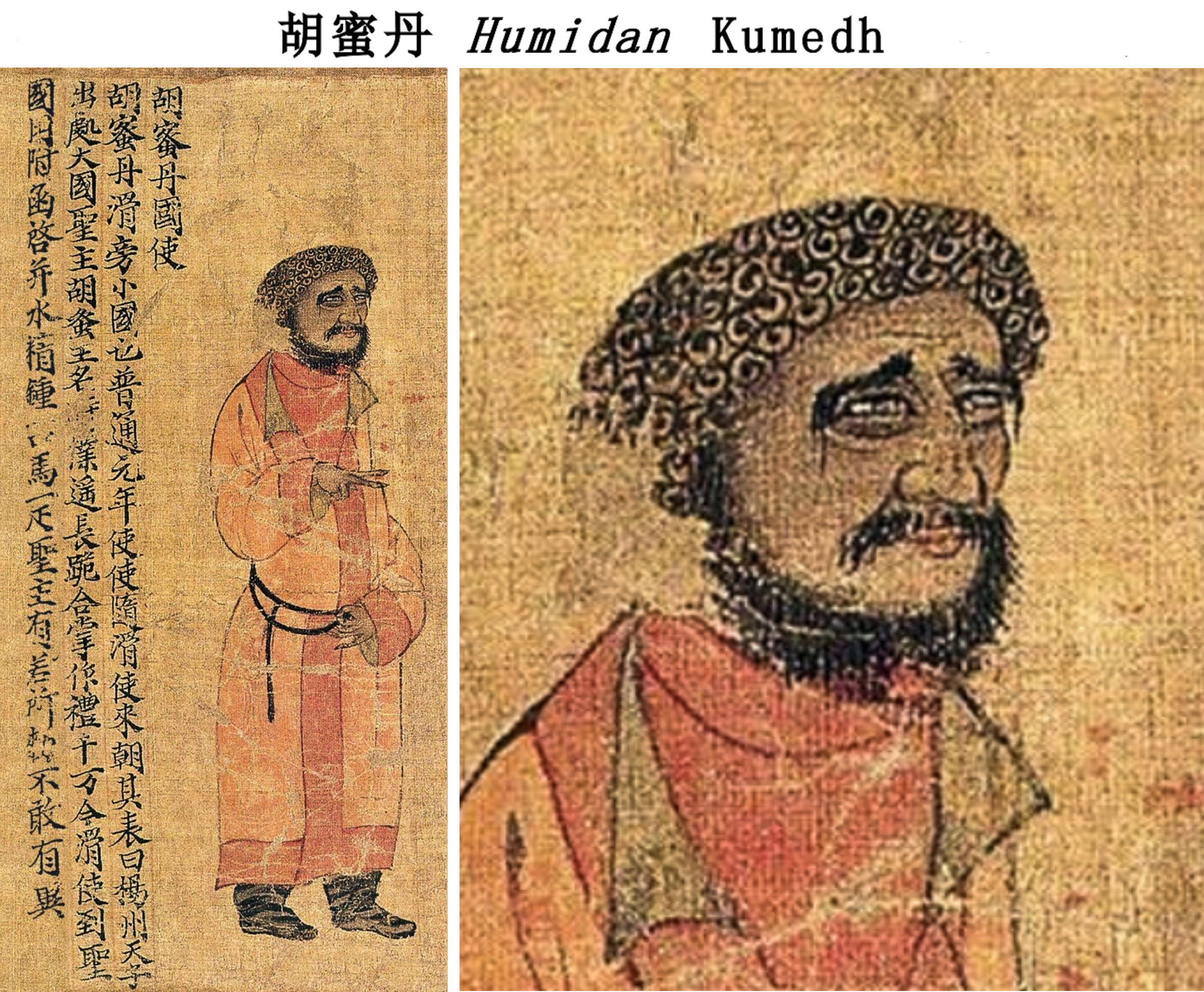
Wakhan ambassador to the Chinese court of Emperor Yuan of Liang in his capital Jingzhou in 516–520 CE, with explanatory text. Portraits of Periodical Offering of Liang, 11th century Song copy.

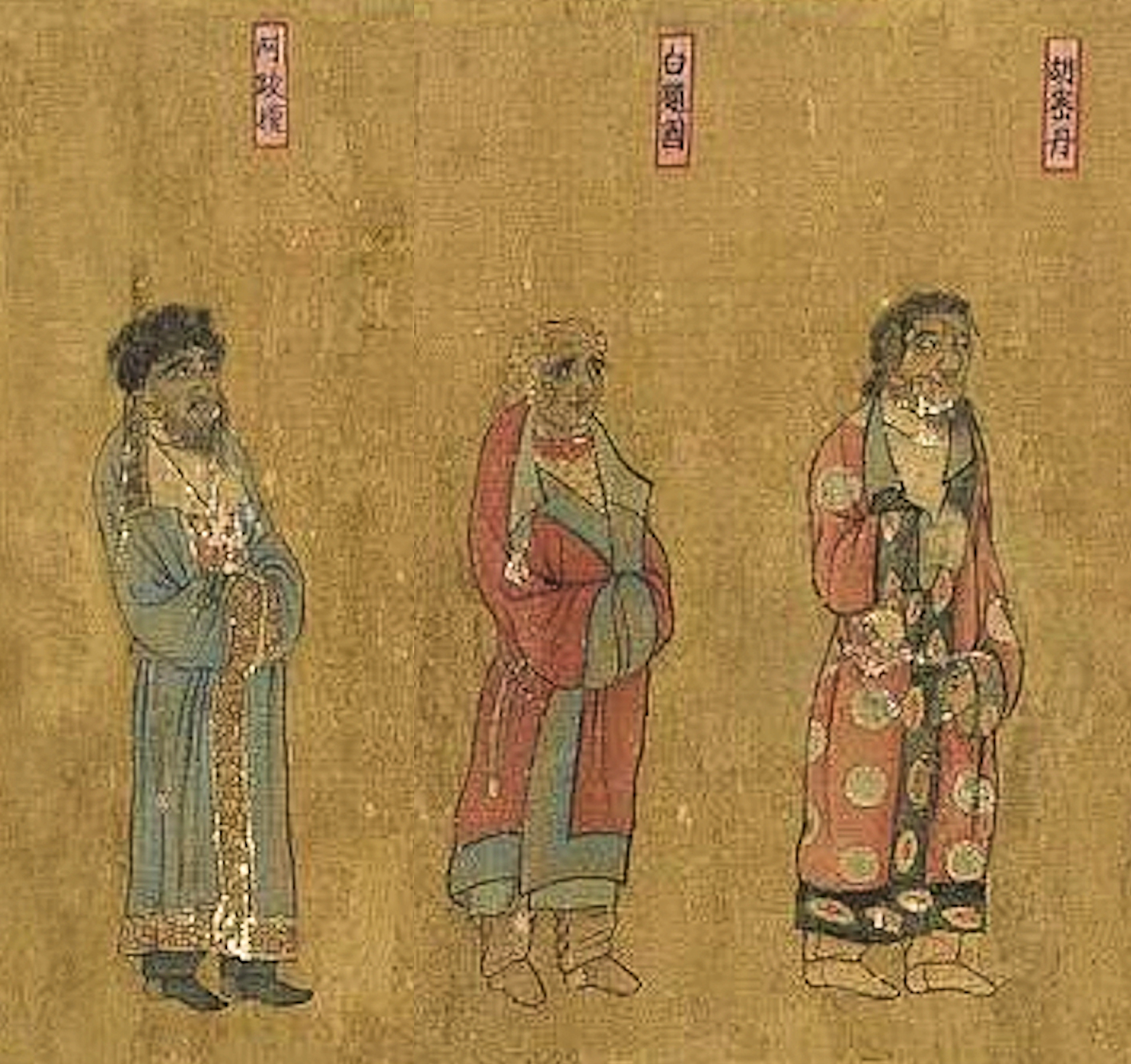
Ambassadors from Qubodiyon (阿跋檀), Balkh (白題國) and Wakhan (胡密丹), visiting the court of the Tang dynasty. The Gathering of Kings (王会图), c. 650 CE

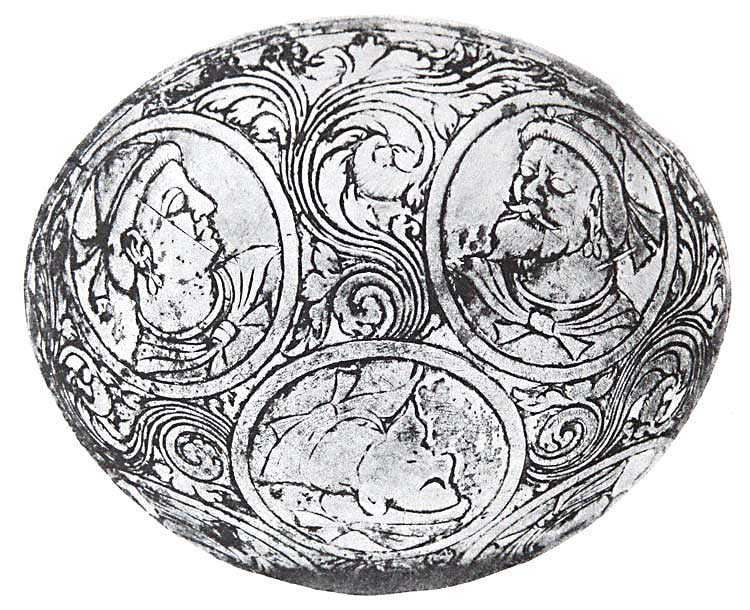
Bactrian types on a silver gilt bowl, 6th c. CE. British Museum.

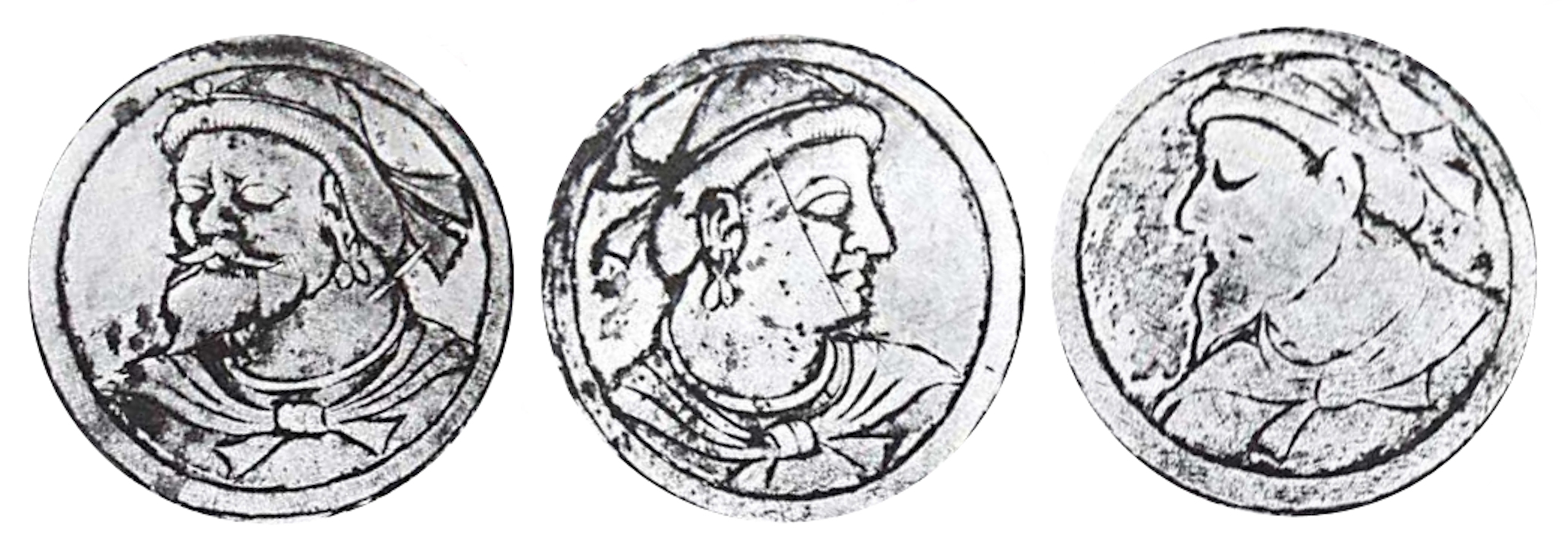
Silver bowl portraits.

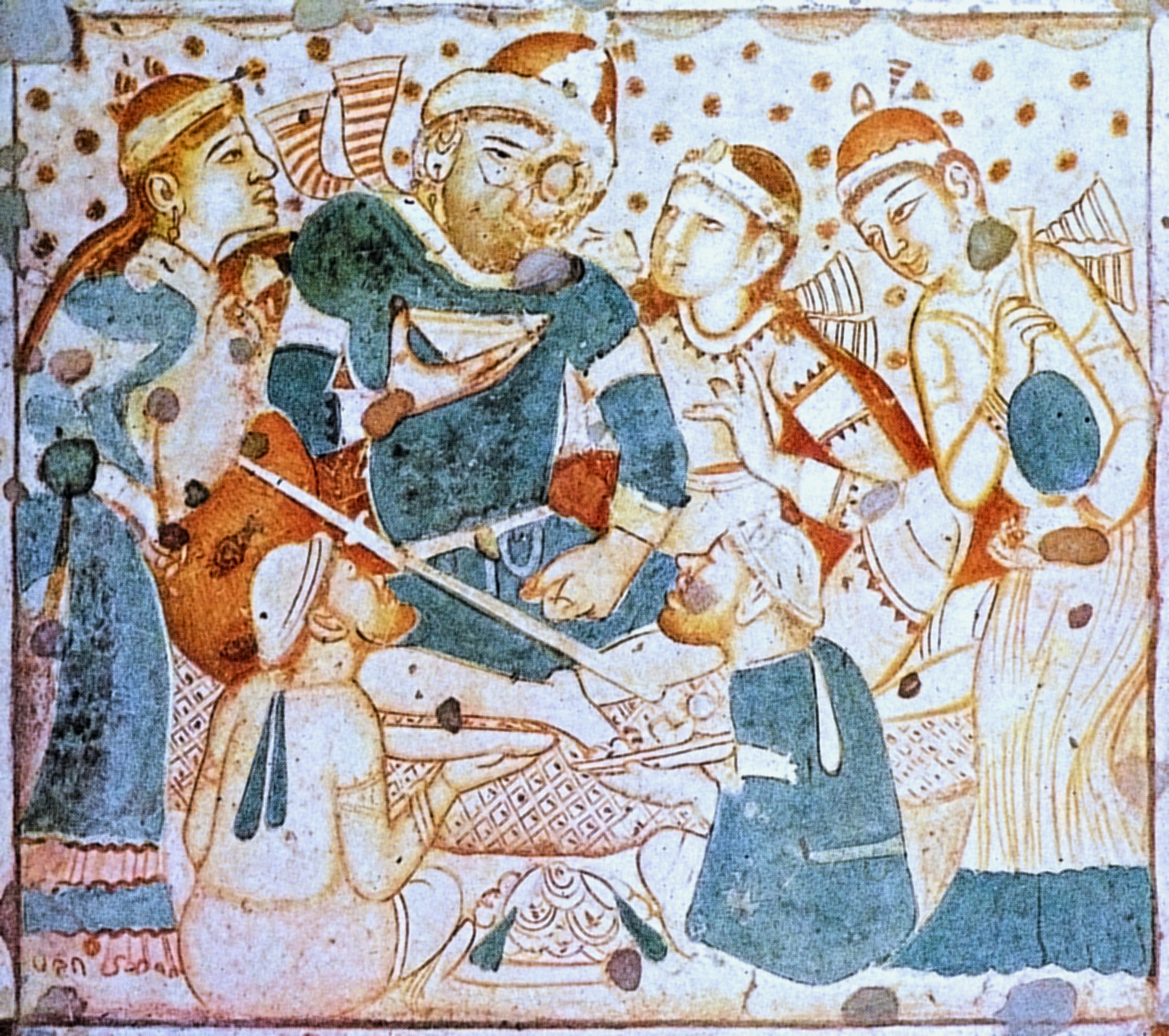
Possible Bactrians revelling, on the ceiling of the central hall of Cave 1 of Ajanta Caves, India (460–480 CE).

=== "Tocharians" in the Tarim Basin ===
The name of "Tocharians" was mistakenly applied by early 20th century authors to the Indo-European people of the Tarim Basin, from the areas of Kucha and Agni. These scholars erroneously believed that these Indo-Europeans had originated in Tokharistan (Bactria), and hence applied the term "Tocharians" to them. This appellation remains in common usage, although the Indo-European people of the Tarim Basin probably referred to themselves as Agni, Kuči and Krorän.

=== Chinese sources ===
In the Xi'an Stele, erected in 781 CE, the Church of the East monk Adam, author of the stele, mentioned in Syriac that his grandfather was a missionary-priest from Balkh (Classical Syriac: ܒܠܚ, romanized: Balḥ) in Tokharistan (ܬܚܘܪܝܣܬܢ Taḥuristan).

== Geography ==
Tokharistan and surrounding regions in the 8th century CE

Geographically, Tokharistan corresponds to the upper Oxus valley, between the mountain ranges of the Hindu-Kush to the south and the Pamir-Alay to the north. The area reaches east as far as the Badakshan mountains, south as far as Bamiyan. Arab sources considered Kabul as part of the southern border of Tokharistan, and Shaganiyan as part of its northern border. In a narrow sense, Tokharistan may only refer to the region south of the Oxus. The region used the East Iranian Bactrian language, which was current from the 2nd to the 9th century CE.

The most important city of Tokharistan was Balkh, which was at the center of the trade between Iran (the Sasanian Empire) and Indian subcontinent.

The region of Tokharistan had been outside of Sasanian control for the three centuries preceding the Muslim conquest of Persia in 633–651 CE. During that time, Tokharistan was under the rule of dynasties of Hunnish or Turkic origin, such as the Kidarites, the Alchon Huns and the Hephthalites. At the time of the Arab conquest, Tokharistan was under the control of the Western Turks, through the Tokhara Yabghus.

== Art and culture ==
Numerous artefacts exist from the art of early medieval Tokharistan, which shows influence from the Buddhist art of Gandhara.

=== 5th–6th century CE ===
Many authors have suggested that the figures in the Dilberjin Tepe or Balalyk Tepe paintings are characteristic of the Hephthalites (450–570 CE). In this context, parallels have been drawn with the figures from Kizil Caves in Chinese Turkestan, which seem to wear broadly similar clothing. The paintings of Balalyk Tepe would be characteristic of the court life of the Hephthalites in the first half of the 6th century CE, before the arrival of the Turks.

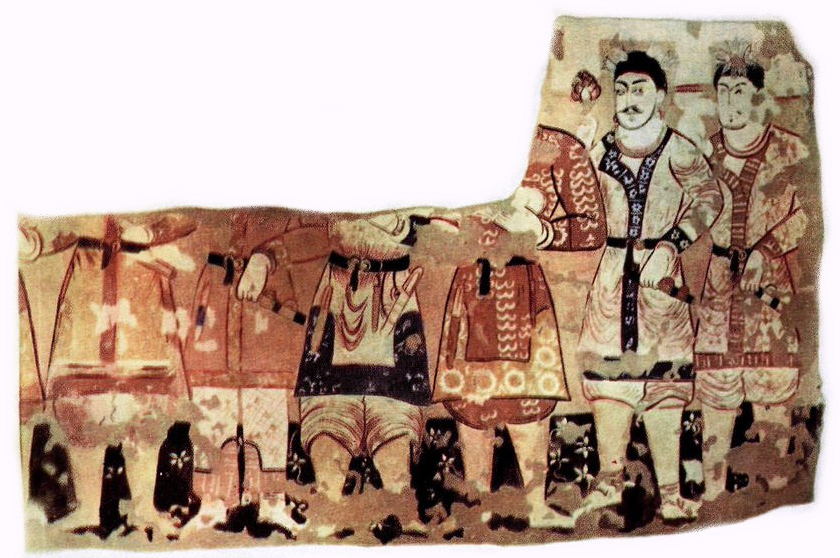
Dilberjin fresco, 5th-6th century.

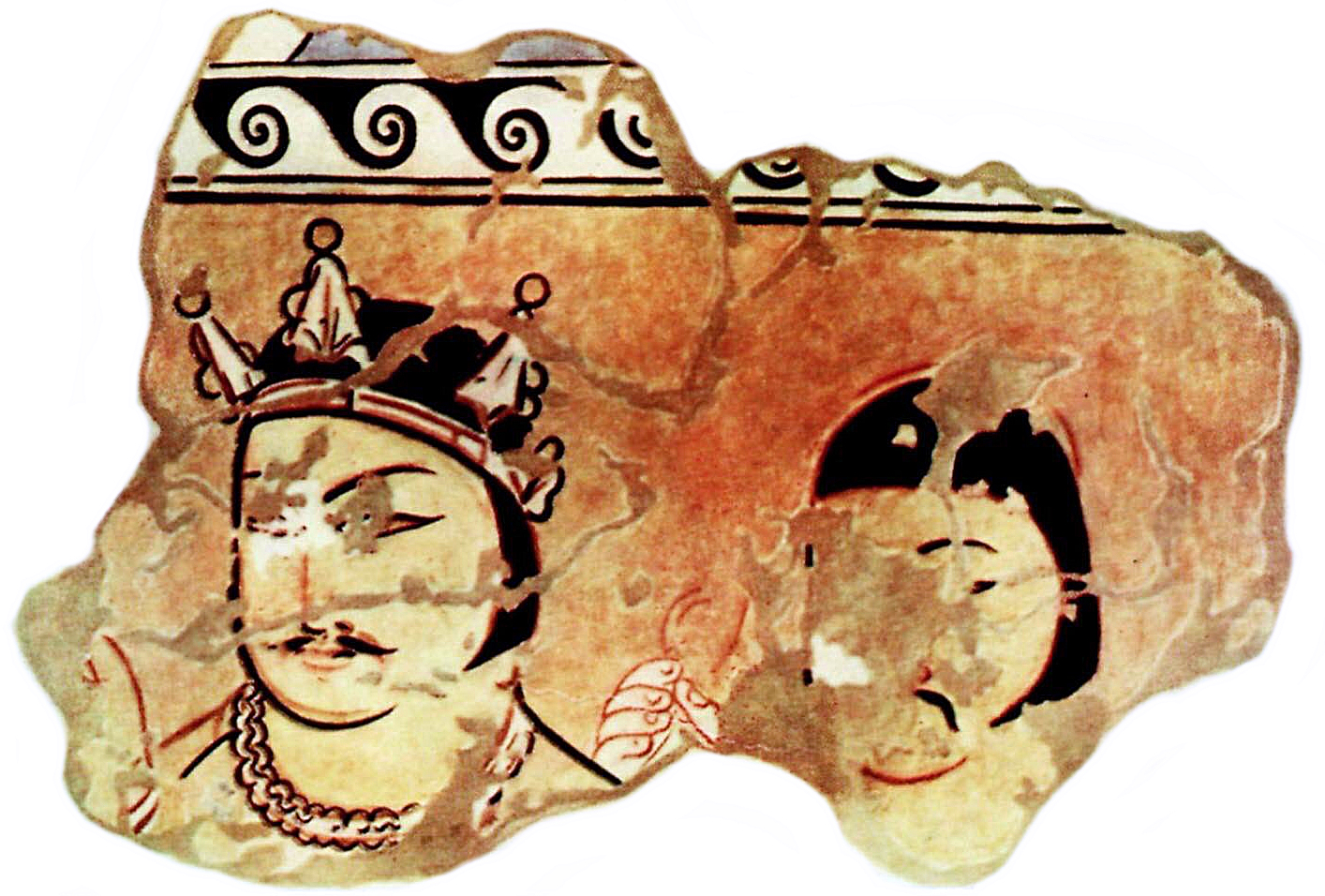
Dilberjin fresco fragment.

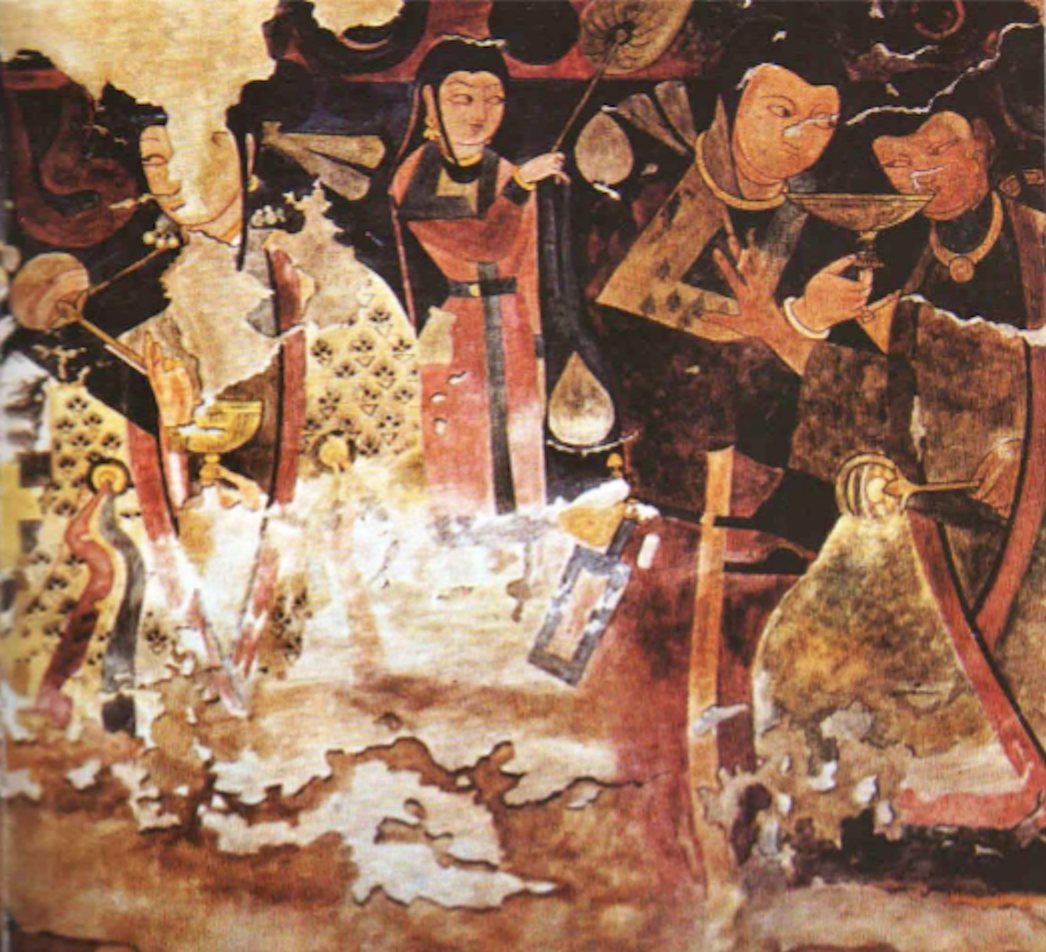
Mural detail, Balalyk Tepe, late 5th-7th century CE

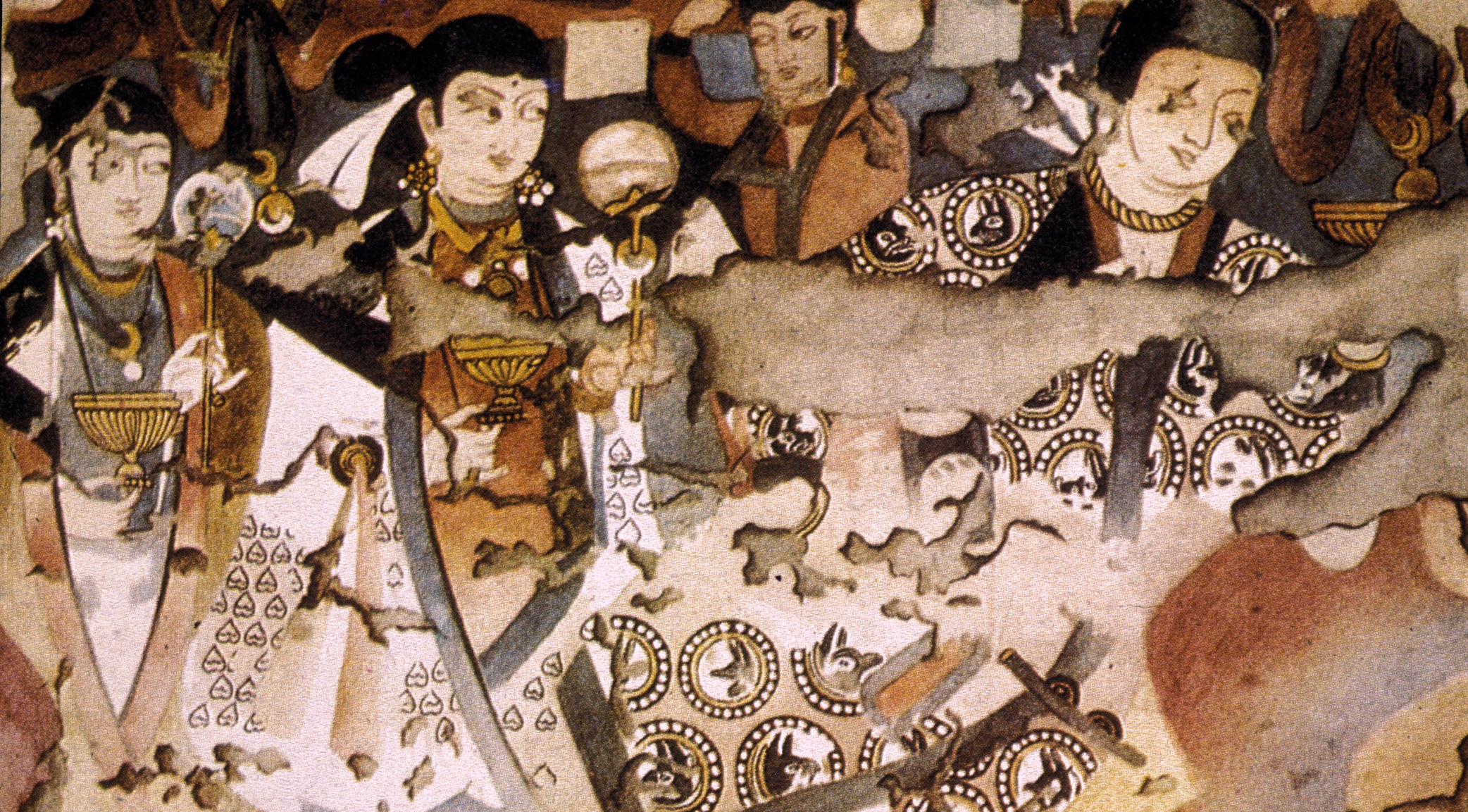
Balalyk Tepe banquet scene, 6th-7th century CE

=== 7th century CE ===
In painting, there is "Tokharistan school of art" (see Northern Buddhist art) with examples from Kalai Kafirnigan, Kafyr Kala or Ajina Tepe, as Buddhism and Buddhist art enjoyed a renaissance, possibly owing to the sponsorships and religious tolerance of the Western Turks (Tokhara Yabghus).

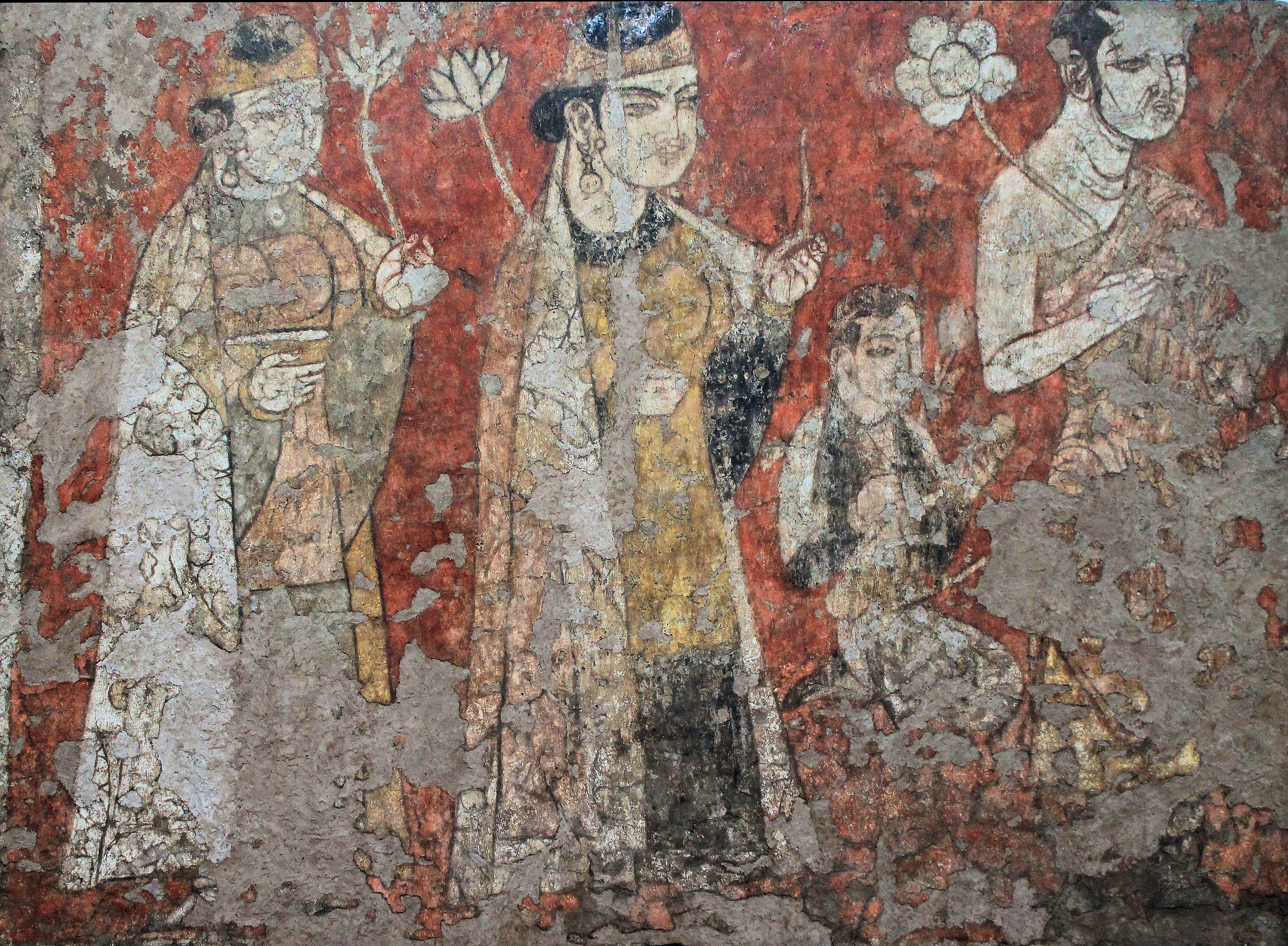
Buddhist mural from Kalai Kafirnigan, National Museum of Antiquities, Dushanbe, Tajikistan. 7th-early 8th century.

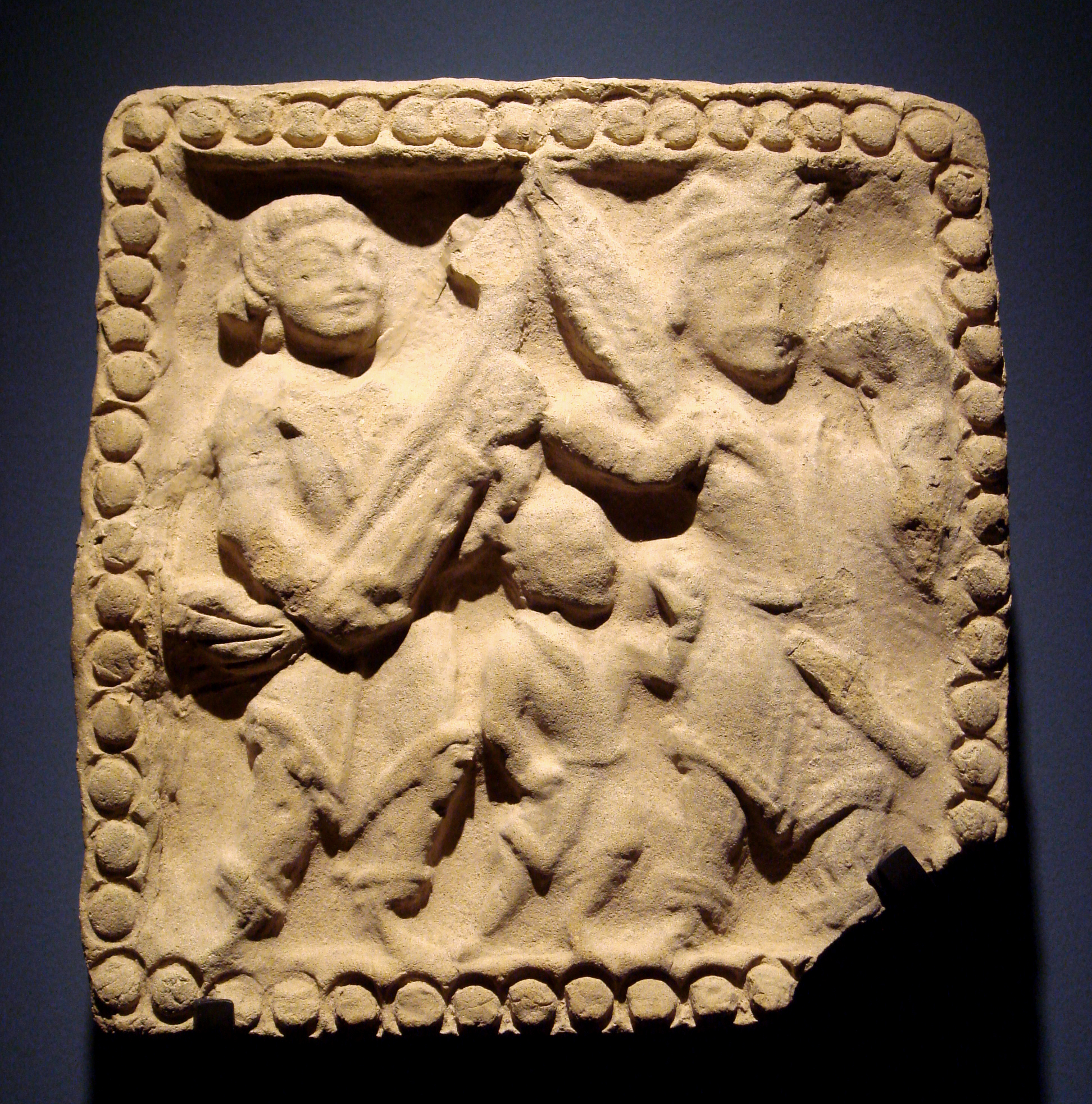
Adults in caftan and child, Kafyr Kala, Tajikistan, 7th century CE. National Museum of Antiquities of Tajikistan

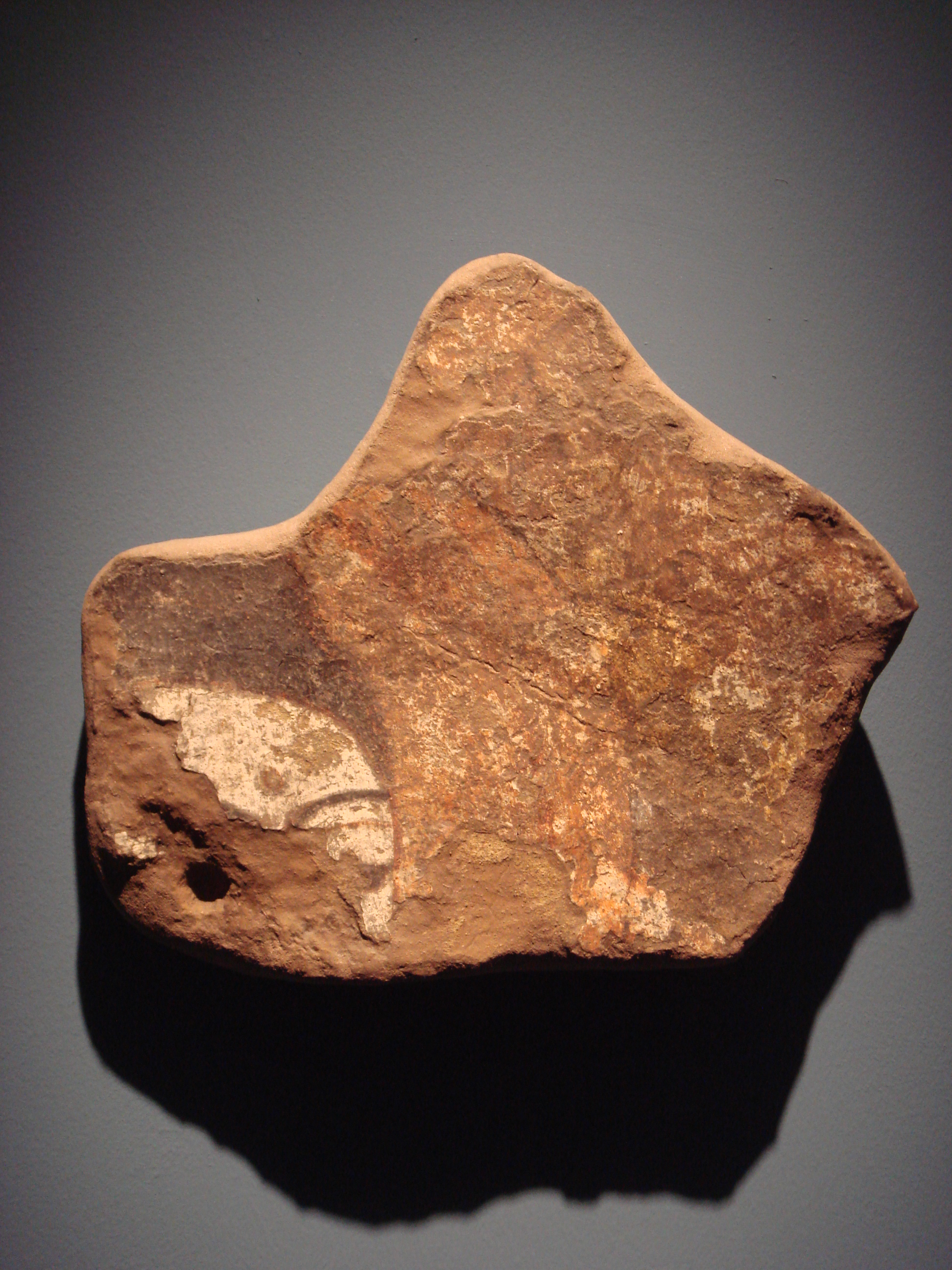
Buddha head, Kafyr Kala, Tajikistan, 7th century CE. National Museum of Antiquities of Tajikistan

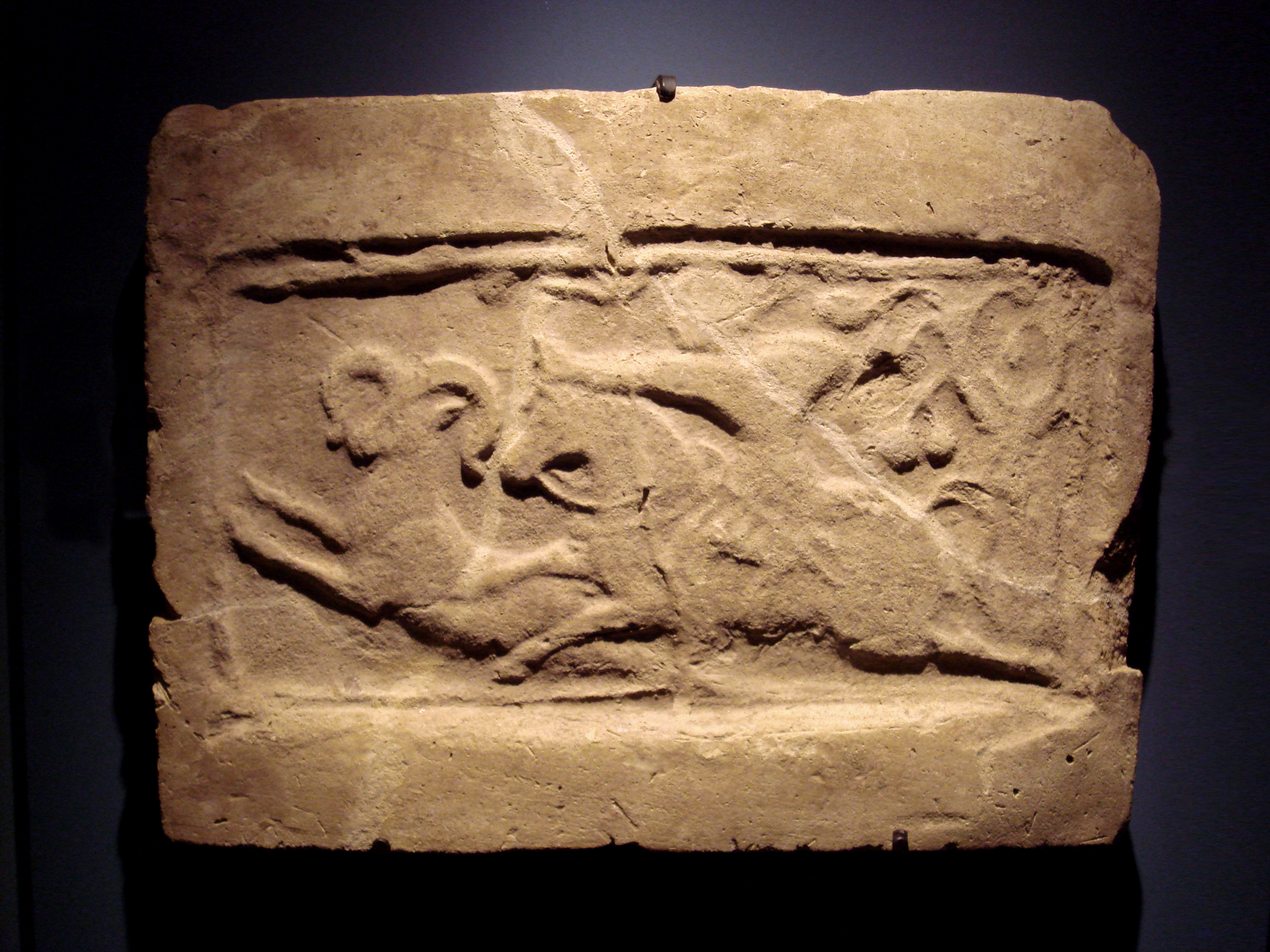
Hunting scene, Kafyr Kala, Tajikistan, 7th century CE. National Museum of Antiquities of Tajikistan

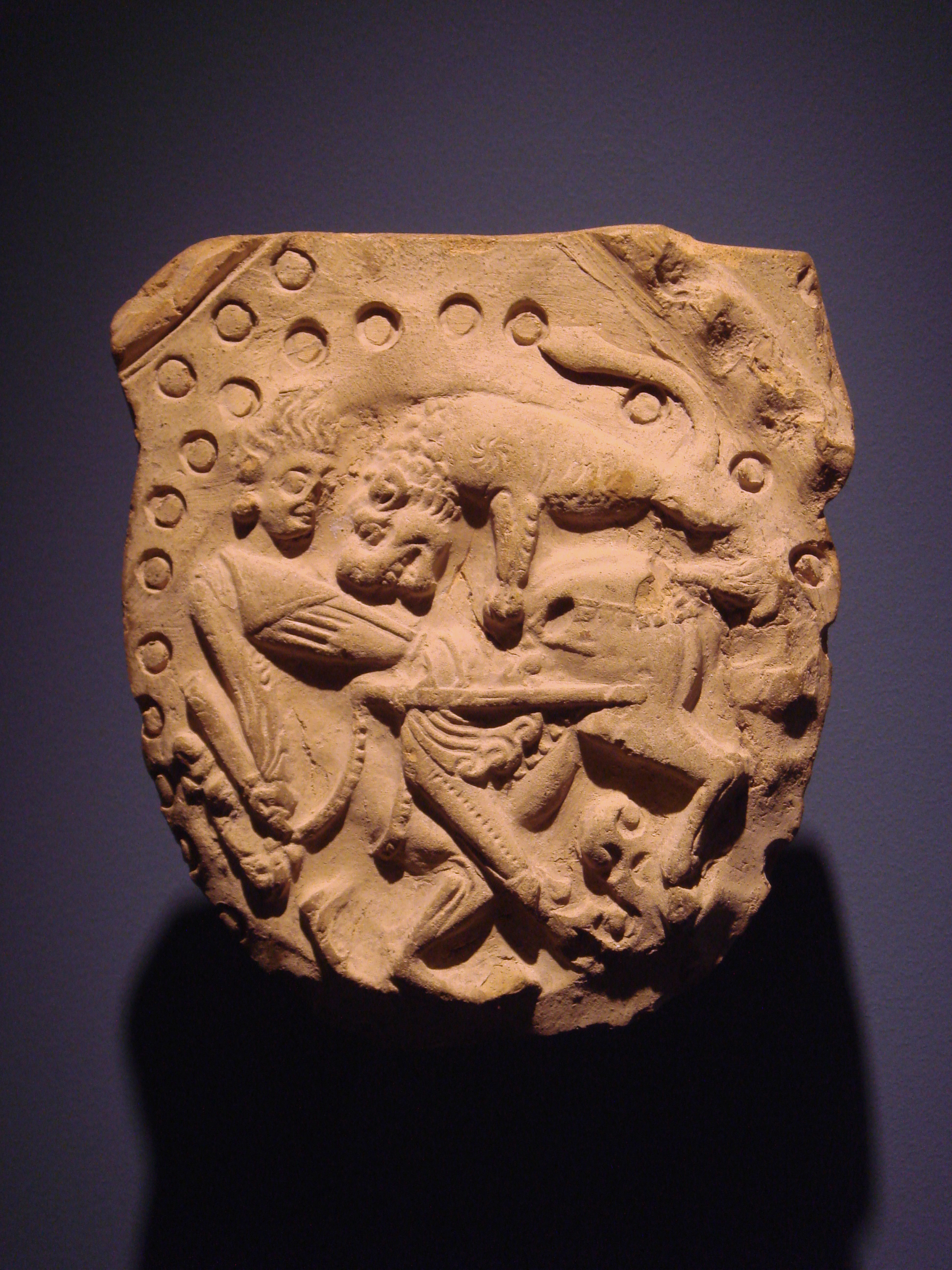
Hunting scene, Kafyr Kala, Tajikistan, 7th century CE. National Museum of Antiquities of Tajikistan

=== Samanids and Ghaznavids, 10th–11th century ===
Islamic art developed with the Samanid Empire and the Ghaznavids from the 10th to 12th century CE.

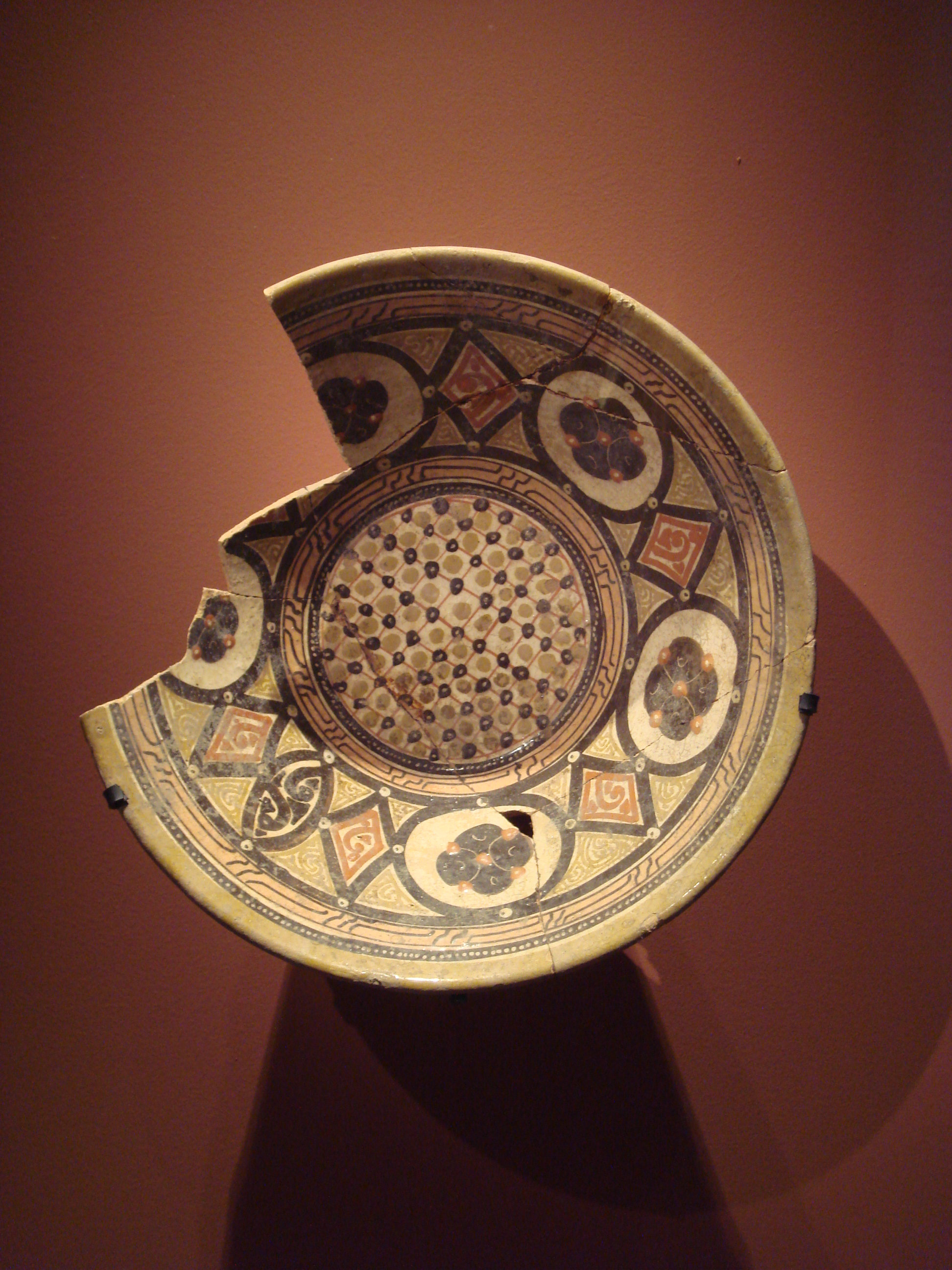
Bowl from Khulbuk, Tajikistan, 10-11th century, National Museum of Antiquities of Tajikistan (KN 1060)

== Muslim conquest ==
Arabs under Rashidun Caliphate had started incursions into Tokharistan as early as 643, during the reign of caliph Umar, but most were transitory in nature. It was when Qutayba b. Muslim appointed the governor of Khorasan in 705 by Al-Hajjaj ibn Yusuf, the governor of Iraq and the East, that ge began his rule with the systematic reconquest of western Tokharistan in the same year. Qutayba, who was tasked with subduing the revolt in Lower Tokharistan, led the final conquest of Balkh. His army was assembled in spring of 705 and marched to Balkh. Per one version of al-Tabari, the city was surrendered peacefully. Another version, speaks of a revolt among the residents. In 706, he received the submission of Nizak, the leader of Badghis. In 707, he marched on Bukhara oasis along with Nizak in his army but the campaign did not achieve any major objective.

According to Baladhuri, when Qutayba became the governor of Khorasan and Sistan, he appointed his brother 'Amr to Sistan. 'Amr asked the Zunbil to pay tribute in cash but he refused, prompting Qutayba to march against him. The campaign was also partially encouraged by his desire to eliminate the support of the southern Hephthalites, the Zabulites, for their northern brethren to revolt. Zunbil, who was surprised by this unexpected move and scared of Qutayba's reputation, quickly capitulated. Qutayba, realizing the real strength of the Zunbils, accepted it and returned to Merv, leaving only an Arab representative in Sistan.

Per Al-Mada'ini, Qutayba returned to Merv after conquering Bukhara in 709. The rebellion of the Hephthalite principalities from the region of Guzgan, including Taloqan and Faryab, led Qutayba to dispatch 12,000 men from Merv to Balkh in winter of 709. The rebellion was led and organized by Nezak Tarkhan and was supported by Balkh and Marw al-Rudh's dihqan Bādām. Nizak had realised that independence would not be possible if Arab rule was strengthened in Khorasan, and perhaps was also encouraged by Qutayba's attempts to achieve his objectives through diplomacy. The success of Zunbils may also have encouraged him.

Nizak wrote to the Zunblis asking for help. In addition, he also forced the weak Jābghū of Tokharistan to join his cause to persuade all princes of the Principalities of Tukharistan to do the same. His plan to stage the revolt in spring of 710 was however spoilt by Qutayba. Bādām fled when Qutayba advanced on Marw al-Rudh but his two sons were caught and crucified by him. Qutayba next marched to Taloqan, which was the only place in his campaign where the inhabitants were not given a complete amnesty, concerning which H.A.R. Gibb states the "traditions are hopelessly confused". Per one account, he executed and crucified a band of bandits there, though it is possible it was selected for this severity as it was the only place where there was an open revolt.

Faryab and Guzgan both submitted and their inhabitants were not harmed. From there, Qutayba went on to receive the submission of people of Balkh. Almost all of Nizak's princely allies had reconciled themselves with Qutayba and there were Arab governors in all towns of Tokharistan, spoiling his plans. He fled south to the Hindu Kush, hoping to reach Kabul and entrenched himself in an inaccessible mountain pass guarded by a fortress. The Arabs succeeded in gaining the fort with help of Ru'b Khan, ruler of Ru'b and Siminjan. Nizak fled along the modern road that leads from the Oxus valley to Salang Pass and holed up in an unidentified mountain refuge in a site of Baghlan Province. Qutayba caught up with him and besieged him for two months.

Sulaym al-Nasih (the counsellor), a mawla of Khorasan, helped in obtaining Nizak's surrender to Qutayba who promised a pardon. Nonetheless, he was executed along with 700 of his followers after orders from al-Hajjaj. The Jabghu of Tokharistan was sent as a valuable hostage to Damascus. Qutayba then went in pursuit of Juzjan's king, who requested amnesty and called for exchange of hostages as a precautionary measure. This was agreed upon and Habib b. 'Abd Allah, a Bahilite, was sent as prisoner by Qutayba while the king sent some of his family members in return. The peace treaty was agreed but the king died in Taloqan on his return journey. His subjects accused the Muslims of poisoning him and killed Habib, with Qutayba retaliating by executing Juzjan's hostages.

== Sources ==
- Huseini, S. R. (2024). Framing the conquest: Bactrian local rulers and Arab muslim domination of Bactria (31–128 AH/651–746 CE) (Thesis). University of Leiden.
- Sims-Williams, Nicholas (2015). "A new Bactrian inscription from the time of Kanishka". Kushan Histories: Literary Sources and Selected Papers from a Symposium at Berlin, December 5 to 7, 2013.
