= Erhart Kirfel =

Erhart Kirfel has been CFO of the Tom Oliver Group since 2011. Before he was the Chairman of the Board of the Public Administration Section of the Association of German Consulting Companies ("BDU"), one of the founders of the World Peace Festival (WPF), and, for 14 years, among other projects, he was the Head of Financial Control for one of the two major political parties in Germany (the German Social Democratic Party, SPD)--including the whole financial control of the German election campaigns.
