= Kirfel =

Kirfel is a surname. Notable people with the surname include:

- Erhart Kirfel, CFO
- Willibald Kirfel (1885–1964), German Indologist
