= Vidarbha (tribe) =

Ancient people in the Deccan

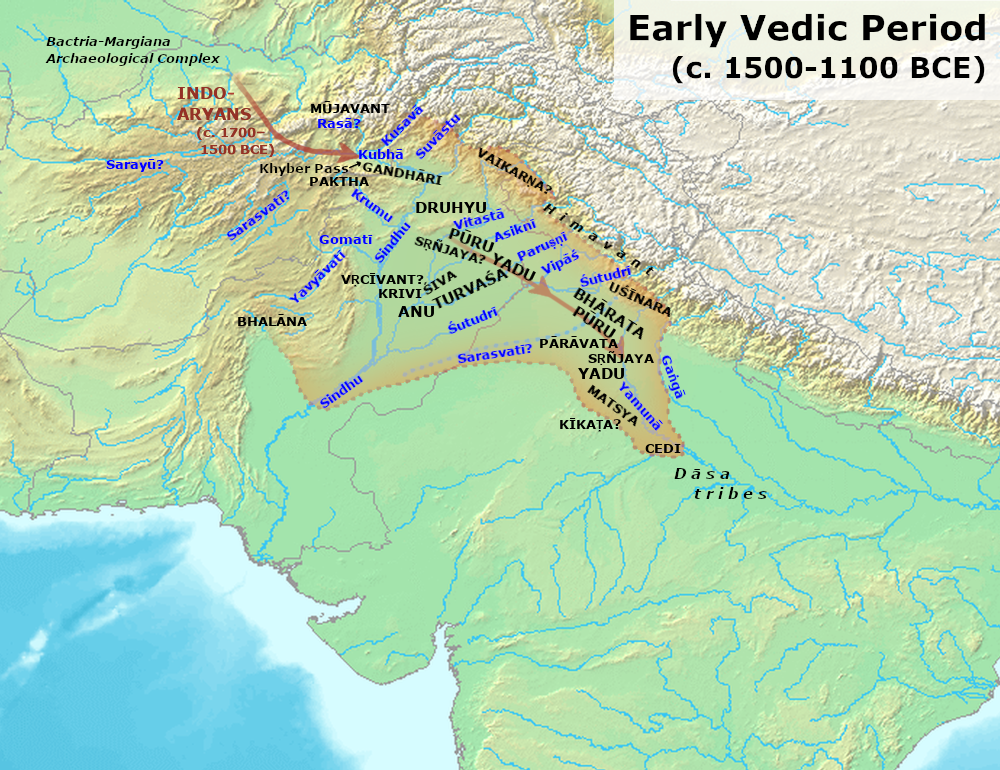
Location of the Yadu tribe from which the Vaidarbhas were descended among the Vedic tribes

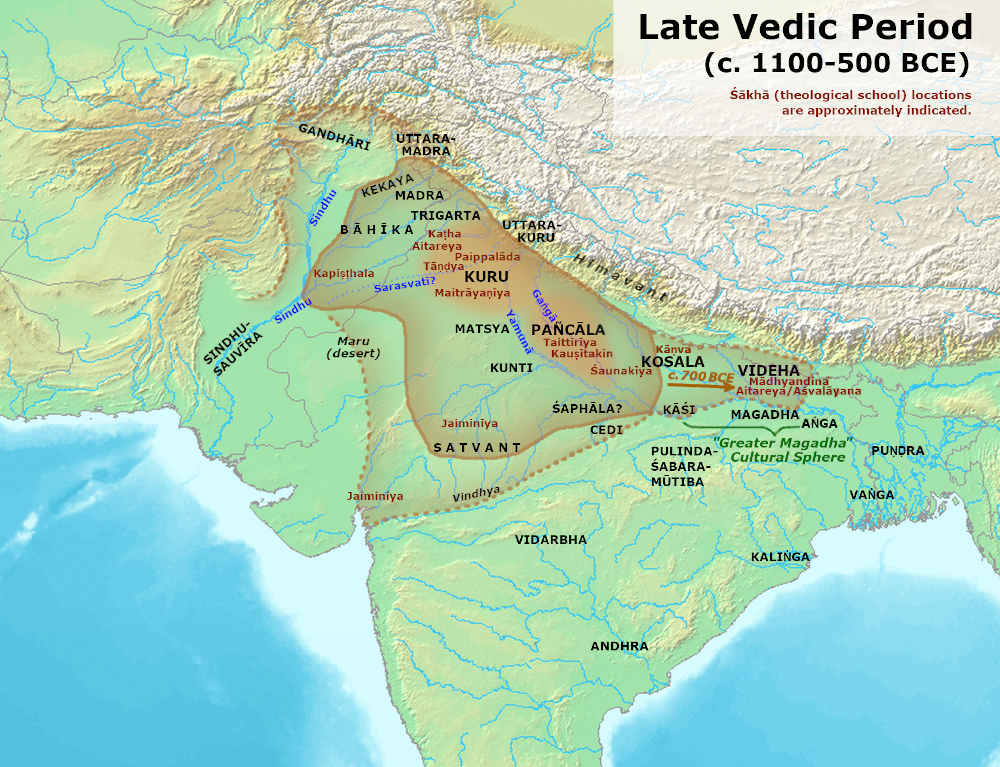
Location of the Vaidarbhas during the late Vedic period

Location of the Vaidarbhas during the post-Vedic period

Vidarbha (Sanskrit: Vidarbha) was an ancient Indo-Aryan tribe of south-central South Asia whose existence is attested during the Iron Age. The population of Vidarbha were known as the Vaidarbhas.

== Location ==
The territory of Vidarbha corresponded to the early modern region of Berar, as well as a large part of the Central Provinces lying between the Varadā and Wainganga rivers. To the north, Vidarbha reached the Payoṣṇī, a tributary of the Tāptī.

The capital of Vidarbha was Kuṇḍina, which corresponds to the modern-day Kaundinyapur in the Chandur tehsil of the Amravati district in Maharashtra.

== History ==
The Vaidarbhas and their ruling clan, the Bhojas, were descended from the Ṛgvedic Yadu tribe.

The kingdom of Vidarbha was already existing as a famous state during the time of the Vaideha king Nimi. The king of Vidarbha at this time was named Bhīma, who was a contemporary of king Nagnajit of Gāndhāra and of Karaṇḍu of Kaliṅga.
