= Dakshinapatha =

Historical region

'Dakinabades' from the 'Periplous of the Erythraean Sea' (1st CE)

Dakshinapatha is a historical region which is the ancient equivalent of the present-day Deccan. It can also mean:

- the "Ancient South of the Indian subcontinent" below Uttarapatha. The term usually encompasses the Deccan and sometimes Tamilakam and Ceylon as well.
- the "great southern highway" in India, traveling from Magadha to Pratishthana, or;
- a kingdom on the Godavari River in southern India

== Etymology ==
The term Dakshinapatha is composite of two terms, dakshina and patha. The name Deccan is an anglicised form of the Prakrit word dakkhin or dakkhaṇa derived from Sanskrit dakṣiṇa (दक्षिण "south"), as the region was located just south of North India. Patha means "road", hence, Dakshinapatha means ''southern road''. However, this term has also been applied to the South Indian realm.

== Historical background ==
Three divisions of the Indian subcontinent mentioned in the later Vedic texts are Aryavarta (Northern India), Madhya Desha (Central India) and Dakshinapatha (South India). The Aitareya Brahmana (1st half of 1st mil BCE) also mentions some tribes in the South (Dakshinadis) of Vindhyan and north Deccan origin such as Satvants, Vidarbha, Andhra, Nishadas and Kuntis. Panini (500 BCE) in his Aṣṭādhyāyī mentions Asmaka Kingdom in connection with Dakshinatya and Kalinga. Dakshinapatha also finds mention in Junagarh rock inscription of Indo-Scythian king Rudradharman from 150 CE

...who by force destroyed the Yaudheyas who were loath to submit, rendered proud as they were by having manifested their' title of' heroes among all Kshatriyas; who obtained good report because he, in spite of having twice in fair fight completely defeated Satakarni, the lord of Dakshinapatha, on account of the nearness of their connection did not destroy him; who [obtained] victory . . . . . . . .; who reinstates deposed kings;

— Rudradaman I, Junagadh rock inscription

== Description ==
The Dakshinapatha trade route was one of two great highways that have connected different parts of the sub-continent since the Iron Age. The other highway was the Uttarapatha or the great northern road that ran from Taxila in Pakistan, through the modern Punjab up to the western coast of Yamuna. Following the course of Yamuna it went southwards up to Mathura, from there it passed on to Ujjain in Malwa and to Broach on western coast. According to Land of the Seven Rivers: A Brief History of India's Geography by Sanjeev Sanyal, the trajectory of the northern road (Uttarapatha) has remained roughly the same from pre-Mauryan times and is now known as Grand Trunk Road or the old NH2 (currently the NH 19 along with parts of northern NH 44 and eastern NH 3). However, the southern road appears to have drifted since the ancient era. Rama's route into exile in the epic may have been an early version of the road, but by the time of Buddha it started at Varanasi and ran through Vidisha in central India, to Pratishthana (now Paithan). It probably extended all the way to Chola, Chera and Pandya kingdoms of the far south. By the Mauryan period, there would have been a branch from Ujjain to the ports of Gujarat which made Ujjain a major city by Gupta era. In the modern era, Dakshinapatha roughly coincides with the old NH-7 (currently the NH 44 along with parts of southern NH 34, NH 30 and NH 35), which runs much further east of the old road but still meets the northern road at Varanasi.

== See also ==
- Uttarapatha
