= Tochari =

Ancient people of Bactria

The Tochari (Note: Less commonly spelled Tokhari, and sometimes anglicized as Tochars.) (/ˈtɒkəraɪ/; Latin: Tocharī (Note: Classical Latin pronunciation: [ˈtɔkʰariː]; Latin singular: Tocharus.), from the Ancient Greek exonym Τόχαροι Tókharoi (Note: Ancient Greek singular: Τόχαρος Tókharos.)), also called the Tukharas (/tʊˈkɑːrəz/) or Tukhars (from the Sanskrit exonym तुखार Tukhāra [stem form] and the Classical Persian exonym تخار Tukhār or طخار Ṭukhār [singular]), were an ancient people of Bactria, a historical region in Central Asia roughly corresponding to northern Afghanistan and parts of Uzbekistan and Tajikistan.

The Tochari were sometimes thought to be a branch of the Turkic peoples, but are now generally considered to have been part of the Yuezhi, a group of Indo-European-speaking tribes mentioned by Chinese sources. The Tochari settled in the eastern parts of Bactria in the 1st century BCE.

== Name ==
Tocharī is the Latin exonym, derived from Ancient Greek Τόχαροι (Tókharoi), while तुखार (Tukhāra) is the stem form of the Sanskrit exonym, and تخار (Tukhār) or طخار (Ṭukhār) is the singular of the Classical Persian exonym.

The word طخاران (Ṭukhārān), which appears in the name of what seems to be a district of Merv mentioned by Yaqut al-Hamawi, may be a Classical Persian plural of طخار (Ṭukhār) using the suffix ـان (-ān).

The English word Tocharians was first used as a synonym of Tochari and is still occasionally used as such. In the early 20th century, after the discovery of Indo-European manuscripts in the Tarim Basin, the name was applied instead to the speakers of the so-called Tocharian languages. The use of Tocharians to refer to the Tarim Basin populations is now widely regarded as a misnomer.

=== Interpretations of the name ===
While most scholars currently identify the Tochari mentioned in Greco-Roman sources with a branch of the Yuezhi who settled in Bactria in the 1st century BCE, alternative interpretations have been proposed. Igor V. Piankov has argued that Tochari was originally not an ethnonym but a socio-political designation referring to the sedentary component of a society dominated by a nomadic component. According to this view, neighboring peoples perceived the term as the name of a distinct people and mistakenly applied it to the entire group (sedentary and nomadic). Piankov suggests that this semantic shift contributed to later historiographical difficulties concerning the relationship between the Tochari, the Yuezhi, and the Kushans, as well as to the later application of the name to populations of the Tarim Basin.

== History ==
The Tochari settled in the eastern parts of Bactria in the 1st century BCE. In his Geographica (8.11.2), Strabo mentions, incidentally only, the overthrow of the Greco-Bactrian Kingdom by nomadic tribes from the north who conquered Bactria from the Greeks: the Asii, Pasiani, Tochari, Sacaraucae and others.

The Tochari are also mentioned by Pliny the Elder and in Ammianus Marcellinus's Rerum gestarum (23.6.57).

By Procopius' time, the Tochari appear to have temporarily fallen out of historical notice, which explains why Procopius discusses the Ephthalites, or White Huns, without referring to the Tochari.

Though subjugated by the Ephthalitæ, the Tochâri would seem, in some degree, to have maintained their national name. In the Chinese report, we find the Oxus dividing the districts occupied by the two peoples. The Ephthalitæ were, however, the ruling caste.

However, in medieval sources, the name Tokharistan (Classical Persian: تخارستان Tukhāristān or طخارستان Ṭukhāristān; lit. 'land of the Tochari') supplanted that of Bactria, which seems to indicate that the Tochari, more numerous though less dominant, had gradually superseded the Ephthalites. The name Tokharistan appears before Islam in Bactrian as Τοχοαραστανο (Toxoarastano) on the 2nd-century silver dish of Nukunzuk and on two 5th-century Bactrian documents, a name which the Tochari gave to the areas they settled but which was likely limited initially to Bactria's eastern parts.

== Sources ==
- Crawford, Osbert Guy Stanhope, ed. (1957). Antiquity. Vol. 31–32.
- Hansen, Valerie (2017). The Silk Road.
- Huseini, S. R. (2024). Framing the conquest: Bactrian local rulers and Arab muslim domination of Bactria (31–128 AH/651–746 CE) (Thesis). University of Leiden.
- Kingsmill, Thos. W. (1878). "The Migrations and Early History of the White Huns; principally from Chinese Sources". Journal of the Royal Asiatic Society.
- Knobloch, Edgar (1972). Beyond the Oxus: Archaeology, Art & Architecture of Central Asia.
- Piankov, Igor V. (2010). "The Tochari – Who Are They?". Anabasis. 1: 97–106.
- Sims-Williams, Nicholas (2015). "A new Bactrian inscription from the time of Kanishka". Kushan Histories: Literary Sources and Selected Papers from a Symposium at Berlin, December 5 to 7, 2013.
- Walker, John (1823). A Critical Pronouncing Dictionary, and Exposition of the English Language.
- Warikoo, K. (1989). Central Asia and Kashmir.
- White, David Gordon (1991). Myths of the Dog-Man.
- Wilson, H. H. (1841). Ariana Antiqua.
- Worcester, Joseph E. (1847). A Critical and Pronouncing Dictionary of the English Language.
