= Uttarapatha =

Part of the Jambudvipa in puranic and shramanic cosmology

Uttarapatha (Hindi: उत्तरापथ) is the name used by ancient Buddhist and Hindu texts to describe the Northern part of Jambudvipa (an ancient name for the Indian subcontinent), one of the "continents" in Vedic belief. In modern times, the Sanskrit word uttarapatha is sometimes used to denote the geographical regions of North India, Western India, Central India, Eastern India, Northeast India, Pakistan, Bangladesh, and Nepal in just one term. The pronunciation of the word varies depending on the regional language of the speaker.

== History ==
The name is derived from the Sanskrit terms uttara, for north, and patha, for road. Initially, the term Uttarapatha referred to the northern high road, the main trade route that followed along the river Ganges, crossed the Indo-Gangetic watershed, ran through the Punjab to Taxila (Gandhara) and further to Zariaspa or Balkh (Bactria) in Central Asia. The eastern terminus of the Uttarapatha was Tamraliptika or Tamluk located at the mouth of Ganges in West Bengal. This route became increasingly important due to increasing maritime contacts with the seaports on the eastern coast of India during the Maurya rule. Later, Uttarapatha was the name lent to the vast expanse of region which the northern high road traversed.

== Region ==
The boundaries of Uttarapatha, as a region, are nowhere precisely defined in the Buddhist or any other ancient source. According to some writers, the Uttarapatha included the whole of Northern India, from Anga in the east to Gandhara in the north-west, and from the Himalaya in the north to the Vindhya in the south.

The Jambudvipa region to the south of Uttarapatha was known as Majjhimadesa (or the Middle Country) in Buddhist texts and Madhyadesa in Puranic texts.

According to Buddhist texts, Kamboja and Gandhara, two of the sixteen Mahajanapadas or great nations referred to in the Anguttara Nikaya and Chulla-Niddesa belonged to the Uttarapatha.

== Literature ==
The Buddhist texts include the remaining fourteen of the Mahajanapadas, namely Kasi, Kosala, Anga, Magadha, Vajji, Malla, Chedi, Vamsa (or Vatsa), Kuru, Panchala, Matsya (or Maccha), Surasena, Avanti and Assaka in the Majjhimadesa division.

Numerous Puranic literature terms refer to the Bahlikas, Pahlavas, Sakas, Paradas, Ramathas, Kambojas, Daradas, Tushars, Chinas, Barbaras, Keikayas, Abhiras, Sindhus, Soviras and others as the tribes of Uttarapatha (Kirfel list of the Uttarapatha countries of the Bhuvanakosa).

== Commerce ==
Uttarapatha was famous from very early times for its fine breed of horses and the horse-dealers. There are ancient references to an ongoing trade between the nations of Uttarapatha and the states of East India. Buddhist and Puranic sources attest that the merchants and horse-dealers from Uttarapatha would bring horses and other goods for sale down to eastern Indian places like Savatthi (Kosala), Benares (Kasi), Pataliputra (Magadha) and Pragjyotisha (Assam).

The great Indian epic, Mahabharata gives an account of the ancient roadways. It refers to Uttarapatha (northern highway) which linked the territories of Kirata (perhaps of Magadha), Kamboja, Gandhara and Yavana countries (Shanti Parva, 207.43; Foreign Trade and Commerce in Ancient India, 2003, p 107, Prakash Chandra Prasad)

Documentation exists that the nations from the Uttarapatha like Kamboja, Gandhara and Kashmira were actively engaged in commercial intercourse not only with the states of Gangetic valley but also with Brahmadesh, Suvarnabhumi, south-west China and other nations in the Southeast Asia. When the Chinese envoy Chiang Kien was in Gandhara (circa c 127 BCE), he found to his great surprise that bamboos and textiles from south-western China were sold in the local markets. On personal enquiry, he learnt that these goods were brought to eastern India (Bengal) through Yunnan, Burma and then carried all the way from eastern India to Bactria across India and Afghanistan along the Uttarapatha or the northern high road.

The ancient Pali literature says that merchants from the nations of Uttarapatha were engaged in international trade following the well-known Kamboja-Dvaravati Caravan Route. Merchants from Kamboja, Gandhara, Sovira, Sindhu and other places used to sail from ports of Bharukaccha (modern Bharuch) and Supparaka Pattana (modern Nalla-Sopara, near Mumbai) for trade with Southern India, Sri Lanka and nations of Southeast Asia. Huge trade ships sailed from there directly to south Myanmar. This trade had been going on for hundreds of years before the Buddha. Some merchants from northern India had settled in Myanmar, in the ports and towns located at the mouths of Irrawaddy, Citranga (Sittang) and Salavana (Salween) rivers. The case in point is of two merchant brothers Tapassu and Bhalluka or Bhalluka from Pokkharavati (=Pushkalavati, present Carasadda) in the Gandhara-Kamboja region who also had their trade settlement in Myanmar. The name Irrawaddy for the chief river of Burma (Myanmar) was copied from river Irrawati (Ravi) of the north Panjab. There is also a tradition in Ceylon (recorded in the Pūjāvaliya) that Tapassu and Bhalluka visited the east coast of Ceylon and built a Cetiya, there. An inscription also makes a similar record.

Evidence exists that horse-dealers from Kamboja in the Uttarapatha were trading horses as far as Sri Lanka. Dr Don Martino notes that the merchants from northwest Kamboja had been conducting horse trade with Sri Lanka following the west coast of India since remote antiquity (Epigraphia Zeylanka, Vol II, No 13, p 76).

Several ancient cave inscriptions found in Anuradhapura in Sri Lanka attest the existence of a Kamboja Goshatha or Samgha (Gote Kabojhiana) and a Grand Kamboja Trade Guild (Kabojiya Mahapughyanam) in ancient Sinhala. The terms Kaboja and Kabojiya are the ancient Sinhalese forms of the Uttarapatha Kamboja.

A Pali text Sihalavatthu of the fourth century specifically attests to a group of people known as Kambojas living in Rohana in Sri Lanka.

A regular horse trade between the nations of Uttarapatha and those of eastern, western and southern India is attested to have been going on as late as the medieval ages. King Devapala (810-850 CE) of Bengal, King Vishnuvardhana Hoysala (1106–1152 CE) of Mysore and King Valabhi Deva of Valbhi/Saurashtra (1185 CE) had powerful fleets of Kamboja horses in their cavalries.

There is also good archaeological evidence of Roman trade (1 CE to 200 CE) coming into Gandhara/Kamboja and Bactria region in Uttarapatha through the Gujarati peninsula. The Roman gold coins imported from Rome into Gandhara were usually melted into bullion in these regions.

== Trade routes ==
Corresponding to Uttarapatha, the Dakshinapatha was the name of southern high road which originated from Varanasi, followed through Ujjaini and Narmada valley to Pratisthana (Paithan) in the Mahajanapada of Ashmaka (in modern Maharashtra), onwards to the western coast of India and running in the southern direction. According to Land of the Seven Rivers: A Brief History of India's Geography by Sanjeev Sanyal, the crossing of the two highways made Sarnath (just outside Varanasi) a major place of exchange of goods and ideas in ancient India. Sanyal argues that this is why the Buddha gave his first sermon at Sarnath.

Later, Dakshinapatha was also the name lent to the region of India lying to the south of Vindya through which the Dakshinapatha passed. The name Deccan for the southern part of India has originated from this ancient Dakshinapatha. The philosophies of the easterners were disseminated precisely by the intercourse that went on along the Uttarapatha and the Dakishinapatha trade routes.

== See also ==
- Dakshinapatha
- Grand Trunk Road
- Pali definition of Uttarapatha (metta.lk)
- Uttarakuru
