= Buddhism in Tajikistan =

- Буддизм
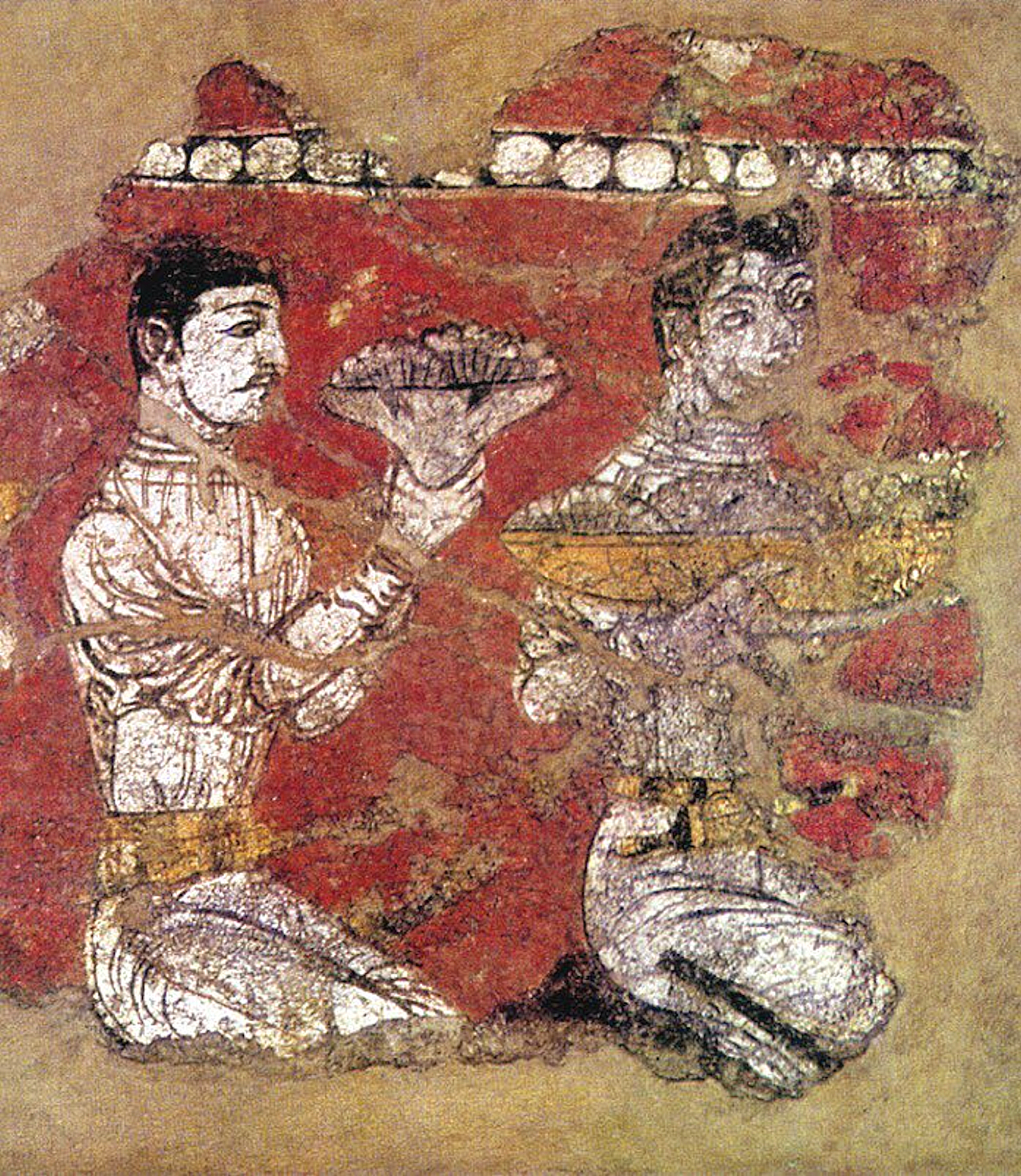
- Reclining Buddha from Ajina-Tepe, 7th–8th century CE
- Type: Historical religion
- Classification: Buddhism
- Territory: Tajikistan
- Founder: Gautama Buddha

Buddhism has existed in Tajikistan from antiquity through the early medieval period. Although Buddhism is no longer practiced in the country, archaeological, historical, and art-historical evidence demonstrates that the region played an important role in the transmission and localization of Buddhism in Central Asia via the Silk Road.

For several centuries, Buddhist monasteries and communities flourished in the regions of ancient Bactria and Tokharistan. Their material remains—particularly monastery complexes, monumental sculpture, and wall paintings—constitute some of the most significant archaeological evidence for Central Asian Buddhism.

== Historical overview ==
=== Early transmission ===
Buddhism reached the region of modern Tajikistan through a combination of long-distance trade, pilgrimage, and missionary activity linking the Indian subcontinent with Central Asia and China. Merchants and monks traveling along Silk Road routes contributed to the gradual spread of Buddhist ideas, rituals, and institutions.

From the early centuries CE, Buddhist communities developed alongside existing religious traditions, including Zoroastrianism and local cults. Buddhism in the region was not uniform but adapted to local cultural and linguistic contexts.

=== Trade and cultural exchange ===
The development of Buddhism in the territory of present-day Tajikistan was closely connected to long-distance trade and cultural exchange along the Silk Road. From the early centuries CE, merchants, monks, and travelers moving between the Indian subcontinent, Central Asia, and China facilitated the transmission of Buddhist doctrines, ritual practices, texts, and artistic traditions. These exchanges were not limited to religious ideas but also included economic cooperation and the circulation of material culture.

Buddhist monasteries were frequently established near major trade routes, river valleys, and urban centers. In addition to serving as religious institutions, monasteries functioned as places of learning, hospitality, and social interaction. They provided lodging for merchants and pilgrims and acted as hubs where local populations encountered foreign religious traditions. Such institutions benefited from patronage by merchants and local elites, reflecting the close relationship between trade networks and religious life in Silk Road societies.

Archaeological evidence suggests that Buddhist communities in the region maintained sustained contacts with neighboring cultural areas such as Gandhara, Sogdiana, and the Tarim Basin. These interactions are visible in artistic styles, architectural layouts, and religious iconography that combine Indian, Iranian, and Central Asian elements. Sculptural techniques, decorative motifs, and monastery plans demonstrate both shared traditions and regional adaptation, indicating the movement of artisans and ideas across vast distances.

The spread of Buddhism in Tajikistan therefore formed part of a broader pattern of intercultural exchange characteristic of Silk Road societies, where religious traditions evolved through continuous contact and adaptation rather than isolated development. Through these networks, Buddhism in Tajikistan contributed to the wider circulation of religious concepts, artistic forms, and institutional models across Eurasia, highlighting the region’s role as a cultural intermediary between South Asia, East Asia, and the Middle East.

=== Kushan and post-Kushan periods ===
During the Kushan Empire (1st–3rd centuries CE), Buddhism received strong royal patronage and expanded widely throughout Central Asia. Kushan rulers supported the construction of monasteries and stupas and facilitated the movement of monks and texts across imperial territories.

After the decline of Kushan power, Buddhist institutions continued to function in the region under subsequent political authorities. From the 6th to the 8th centuries CE, Buddhism coexisted with multiple religious traditions, reflecting the pluralistic character of Central Asian societies.

== Archaeological evidence ==
Systematic archaeological research conducted primarily during the Soviet period revealed extensive evidence of Buddhist religious life in Tajikistan. Excavations uncovered monastery complexes, sculptural programs, mural paintings, and everyday objects associated with monastic communities.

=== Ajina-Tepe ===
Ajina-Tepe is the most significant Buddhist archaeological site in Tajikistan and one of the best-preserved Buddhist monasteries in Central Asia. Located in the Vakhsh Valley near the modern city of Bokhtar, the site dates to the 7th–8th centuries CE. The monastery was organized around two main courtyards and included temples, stupas, chapels, and residential quarters for monks.

Ajina-Tepe is best known for the discovery of a monumental Reclining Buddha statue measuring approximately 12–13 metres in length and representing the Buddha in Parinirvana. The sculpture, originally constructed of clay and straw over a wooden framework, was found in fragments during excavations in the 1960s. After conservation and restoration, it is now displayed in the National Museum of Antiquities of Tajikistan in Dushanbe.

The artistic program of Ajina-Tepe included wall paintings and sculptural ensembles depicting Buddhas, bodhisattvas, and donors, reflecting both doctrinal and devotional aspects of Buddhism in the region.

=== Other sites ===
Additional Buddhist archaeological sites in Tajikistan include Khisht Tepe and Kalai Kafirnigan. Excavations at these locations have revealed monastery layouts, fragments of Buddhist sculpture, and architectural remains, suggesting a network of religious centers rather than a single isolated complex.

== Art and material culture ==
Buddhist art from Tajikistan reflects a synthesis of Indian, Iranian, and Central Asian artistic traditions. Sculptures and murals exhibit stylistic features associated with Greco-Buddhist art, such as naturalistic anatomy, draped garments, and expressive gestures, while also incorporating local aesthetic conventions.

The use of clay sculpture, painted reliefs, and architectural decoration highlights regional adaptations to available materials and techniques.

== Religious life and practice ==
Although textual evidence is limited, archaeological remains suggest that Buddhist religious life in Tajikistan included monastic discipline, devotional worship, ritual offerings, and the veneration of images. Monasteries likely functioned as centers of education, ritual practice, and interaction with lay communities, particularly merchants traveling along Silk Road routes.

== Decline ==
Buddhism in Tajikistan declined between the 8th and 10th centuries CE. The Arab conquest of Central Asia and the subsequent Islamization of Central Asia altered the religious landscape of the region. As political patronage shifted and economic networks changed, Buddhist monastic institutions gradually ceased to function.

By the medieval period, Buddhism had disappeared as a living religious tradition in the area.

== Modern period ==
In modern Tajikistan, Buddhism has limited indigenous or organized religious presence. Archaeological sites associated with Buddhism are protected as part of the country’s cultural heritage, and major artifacts are preserved in national museums. Scholarly interest continues through archaeological research and international collaboration.

== Legacy ==
The Buddhist heritage of Tajikistan underscores Central Asia’s historical role as a crossroads of religious, artistic, and cultural exchange. Sites such as Ajina-Tepe contribute significantly to the understanding of Buddhist transmission, Silk Road history, and the development of regional religious traditions.

== See also ==
- Buddhism in Central Asia
- Silk Road
- Greco-Buddhist art
- Kushan Empire
