= Kalai Kafirnigan =

- Kala-i Kafirnigan
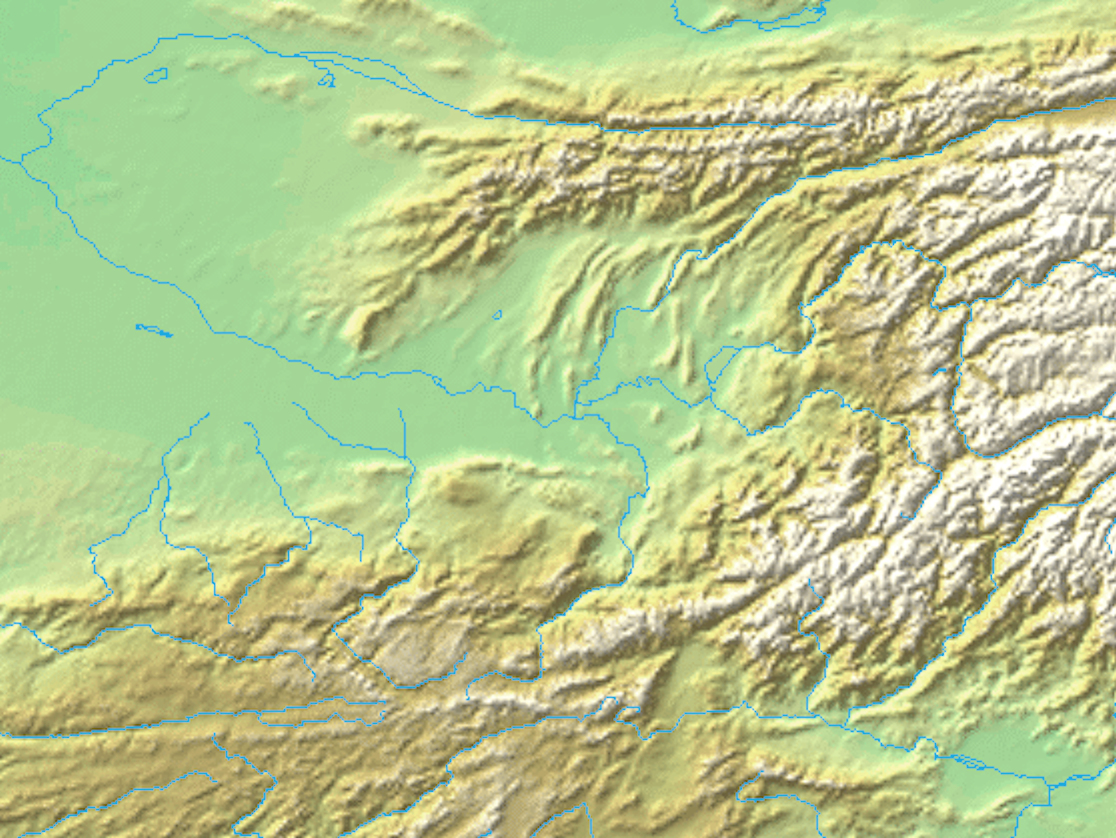
- Location within West and Central Asia Location within Bactria Location within Tajikistan
- 37.897429°N 68.262701°E
- Type: Buddhist cloister
- Location: Tajikistan

Kalai Kafirnigan, also Kala-i Kafirnigan was a Buddhist temple in the region of Tokharistan (Classical Bactria), dated to the 7th-8th century CE. Buddhism in Tokharistan is said to have enjoyed a revival under the Western Turks (known as Tokhara Yabghus in Tokharistan). Several monasteries of Tokharistan dated to the 7th-8th centuries display beautiful Buddhist works of art, such as Kalai Kafirnigan, Ajina Tepe, Khisht Tepe or Kafyr Kala, around which Turkic nobility and populations followed Hinayana Buddhism.

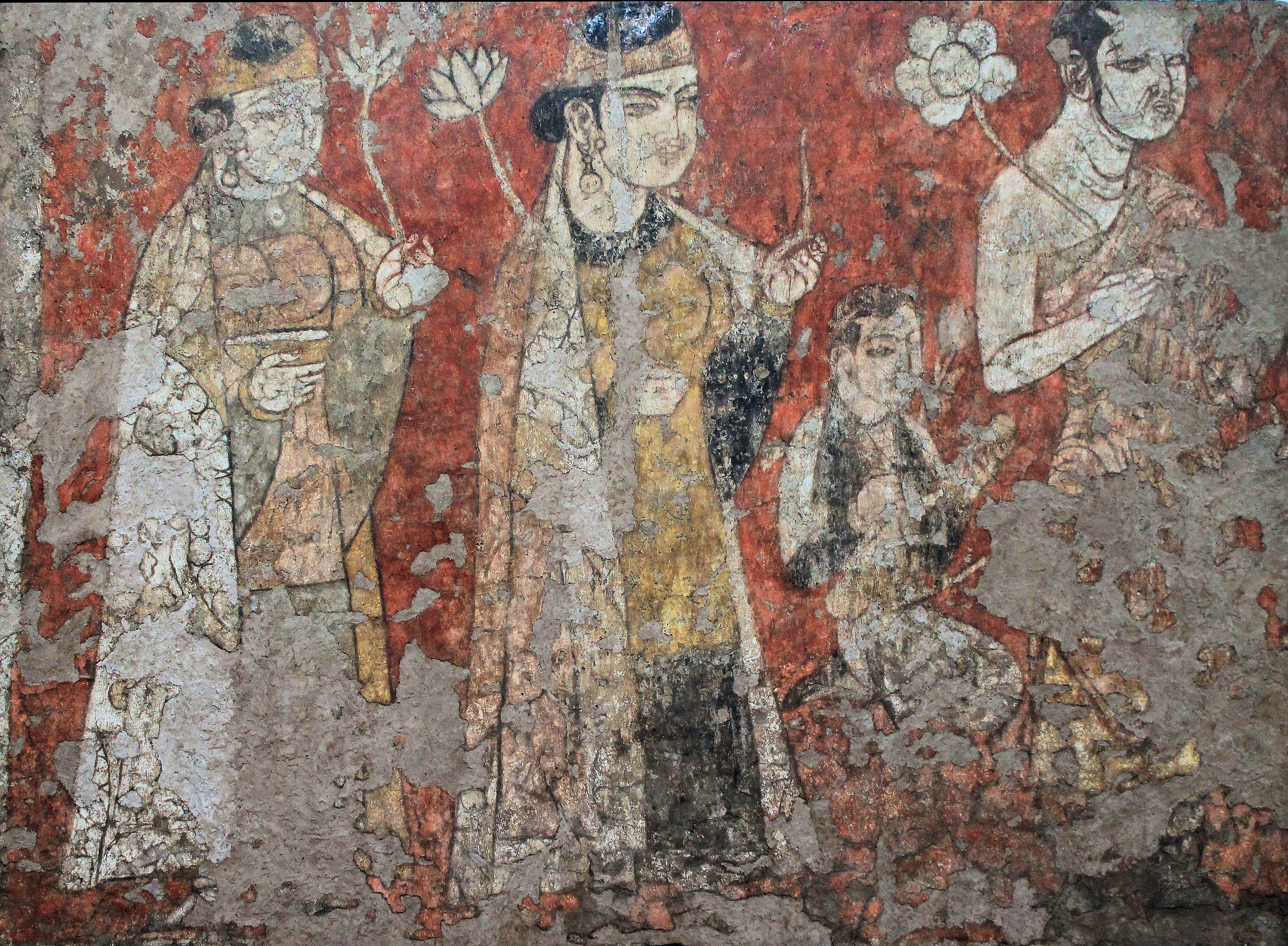
Buddhist mural from Kalai Kafirnigan, Museum of National Antiquities, Dushanbe, Tajikistan. 7th-early 8th century.

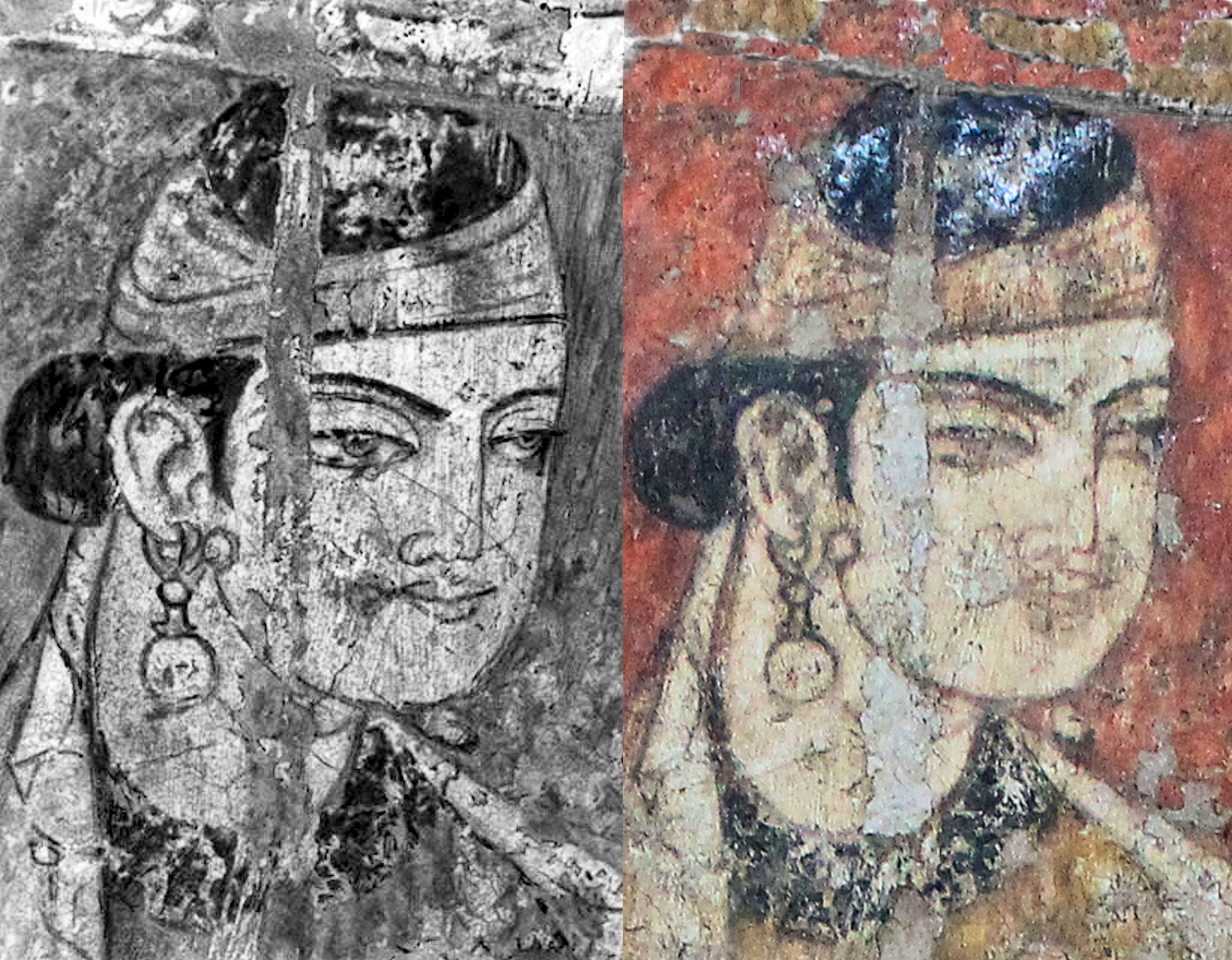
Female devotee in Kalai Kafirnigan. 7th-early 8th century.

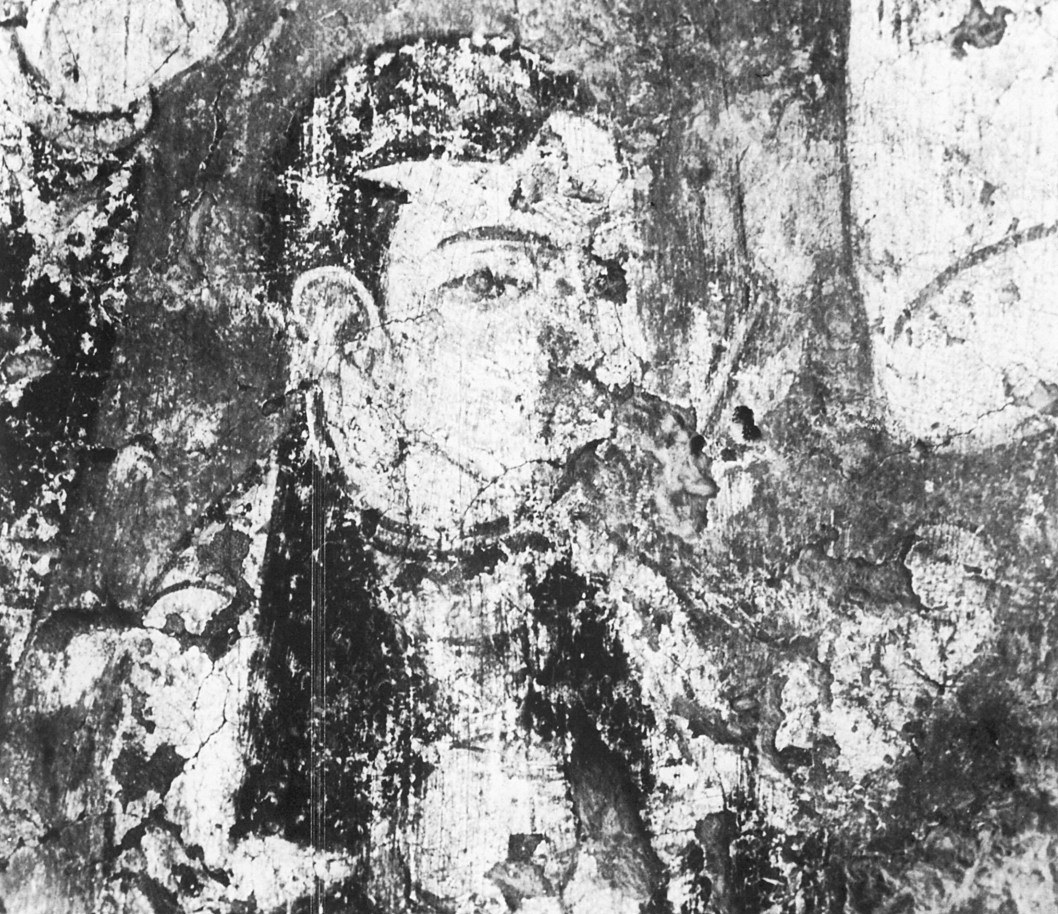
Mural of a male figure
