= Buddha in Nirvana =

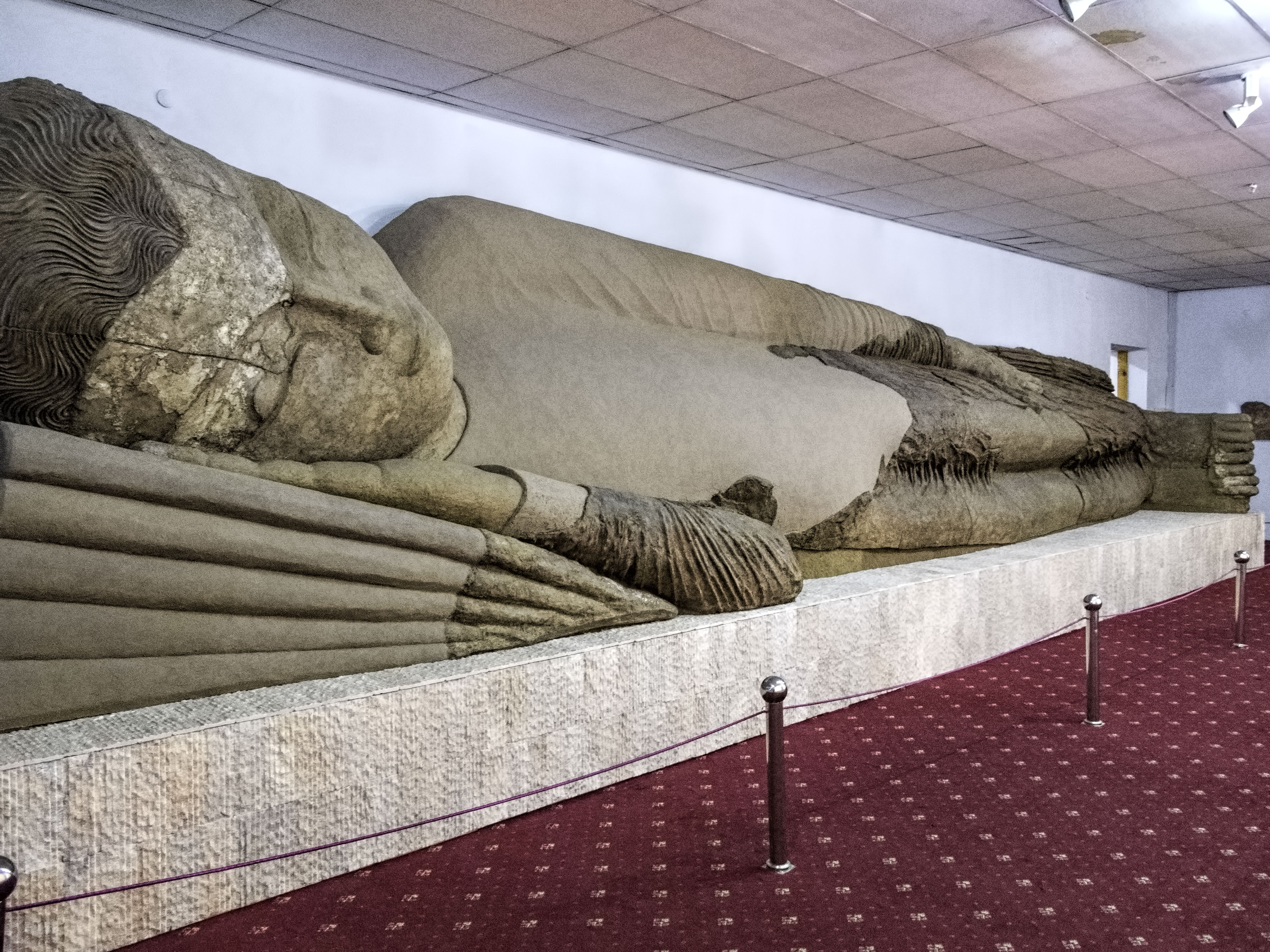
Full-length. The lighter restored section can be seen in the middle.

Buddha in Nirvana or "Sleeping Buddha" is a statue which was found in 1959 in the south of Tajikistan by the archaeologist Boris Litvinskiy, during the excavation of the Buddhist temple on the Ajina tepe, in the valley of the Vakhsh River, near the city of Bokhtar in 1964–1968.

The statue of the Sleeping Buddha is now one of the most striking exhibits of the National Museum of Antiquities of Tajikistan in Dushanbe: it is a 13-meter long clay statue of a reclining Buddha, although only the original lower part and the head were preserved and the middle of the body is a restoration. When the temple of the Ajina-Teppa was severely damaged during the Arab conquest in the 7th century the statue of the Buddha in Nirvana was severely disfigured and the face and part of the chest were broken. A team of restorers from the Hermitage Museum in Saint Petersburg (then Leningrad) collected and transported to Dushanbe 43 pieces of the clay giant.

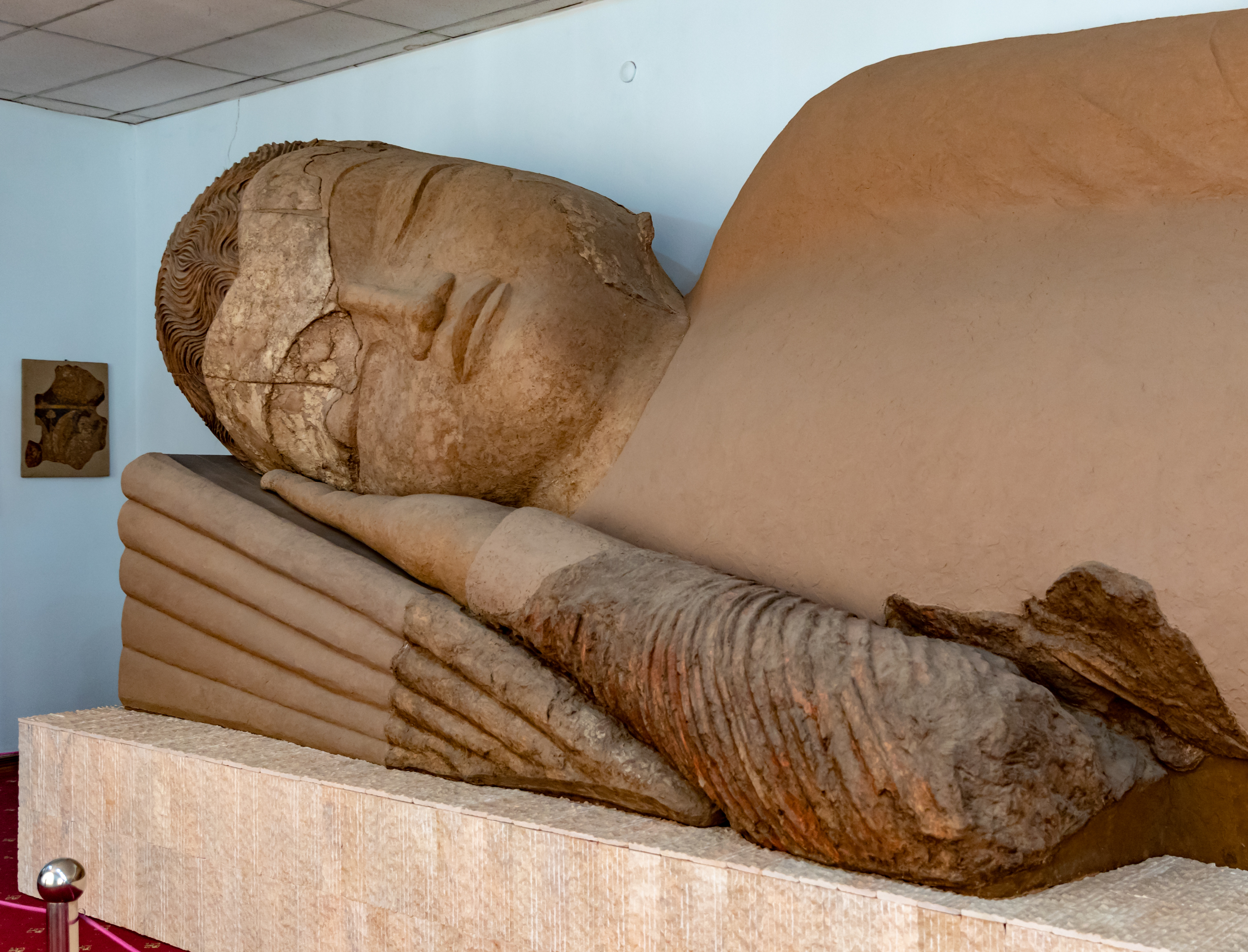
Close up of the Buddha's head

== Origin ==
In the 5th and 6th centuries of the present era the population of Central Asia and Afghanistan professed several religions and cults and in Southern Tajikistan practised Buddhism for several centuries. The great Silk Road connecting Central Asia with India also runs here. The Vakhsh valley is why archaeologists have found hundreds of Buddhist temples there.

== Location ==
The possibility of full restoration appeared to restorers only when the National Museum of Antiquities was built, where the largest hall was allocated for the Buddha in Nirvana. In early 2001, the United States allocated 30 thousand dollars for the restoration of the clay figure. A little later the Japanese government issued a grant of 260 thousand dollars to the museum.

For the final restoration of the Buddha, restorers from the Hermitage, under the direction of Vera Fomin, came to the aid of their Tajik colleagues of the Museum of Antiquities.

The restoration of the giant statue lasted two years (2000–2001). The largest clay statue of Buddha in the world appeared before the visitors of the Museum of Antiquities on September 9, 2000, the day of the 10th anniversary of the independence of Tajikistan. Now the inspection of the "Buddha in Nirvana" is included in the program of visits of all heads of state and government, heads of authoritative international organizations, scholars and cultural figures visiting Tajikistan. The mysterious smile of the Buddha attracts visitors of different religions and different ages.
