= Ajinateppa =

- Ajinateppa
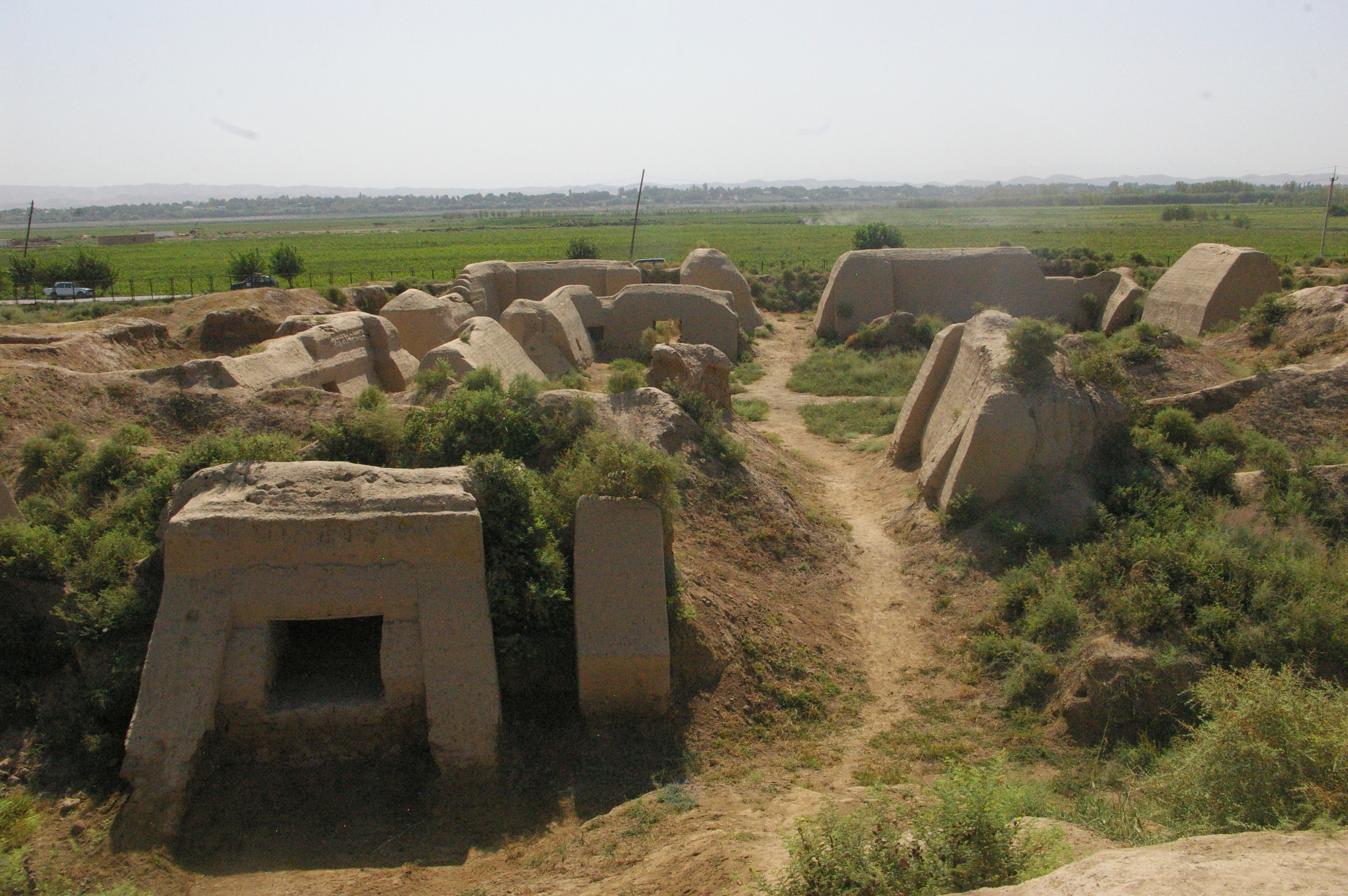
- View of Ajinateppa

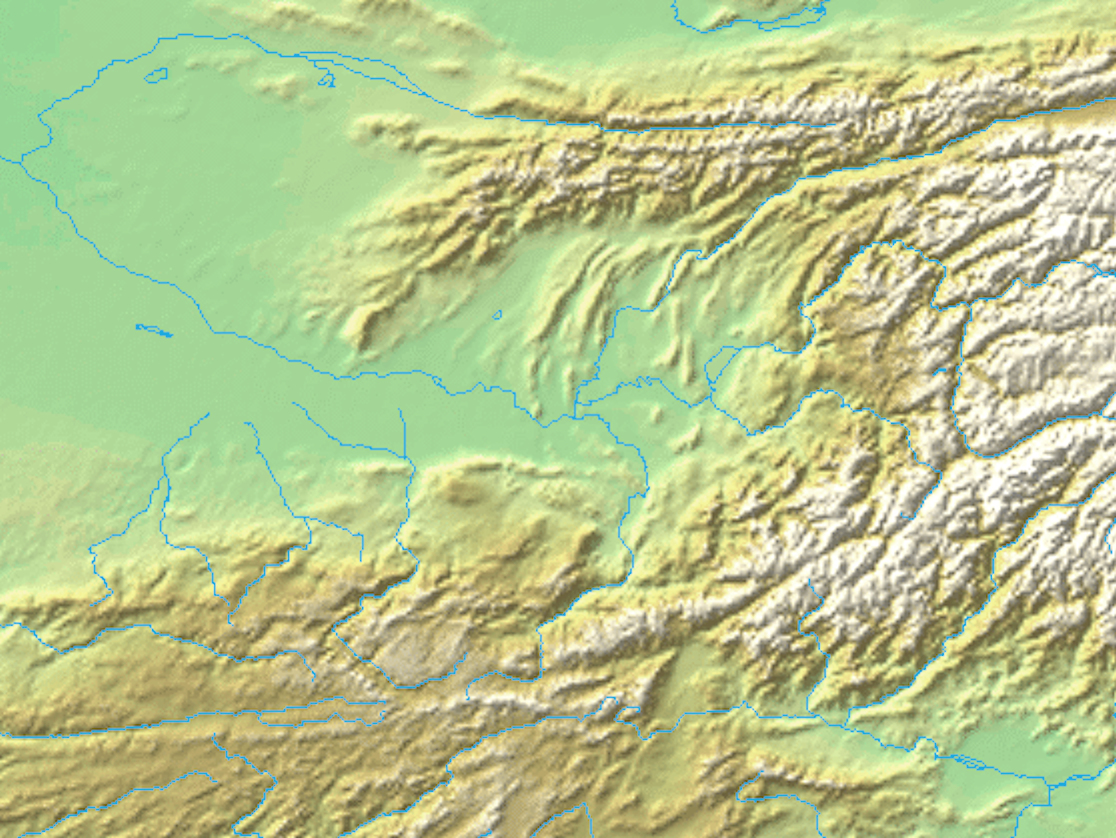
- Location within West and Central Asia Location within Bactria Location within South Asia Location within Tajikistan
- 37.7980°N 68.8544°E
- Type: Buddhist cluster
- Location: Tajikistan

UNESCO World Heritage Site
- Part of: Cultural Heritage Sites of Ancient Khuttal
- Criteria: Cultural: ii, iii
- Reference: 1627-001
- Inscription: 2025 (47th Session)

Ajinateppa (Tajik: Аҷинатеппа, romanized: Ajinateppa, Russian: Аджина-Тепе; ) is a Buddhist monastery cluster located 12 kilometers east of the city of Bokhtar, Tajikistan.

Buddhism in Tokharistan is said to have enjoyed a revival under the Western Turks. Several monasteries dated to the 7th-8th centuries display beautiful Buddhist works of art, such as Qal'a-i Kafirnihān, Ajinateppa, Khisht Tepe or Kafyr Kala, around which Turkic nobility and populations followed Hinayana Buddhism.

This site was added to the UNESCO World Heritage Tentative List on September 11, 1999 in the Cultural category.

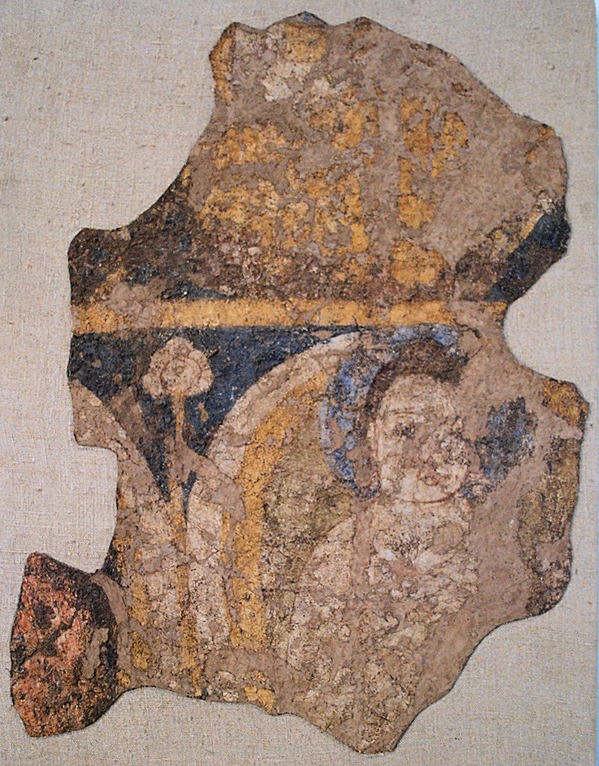
Mural from the Buddhist Monastery at Ajinateppe, National Museum of Antiquities of Tajikistan

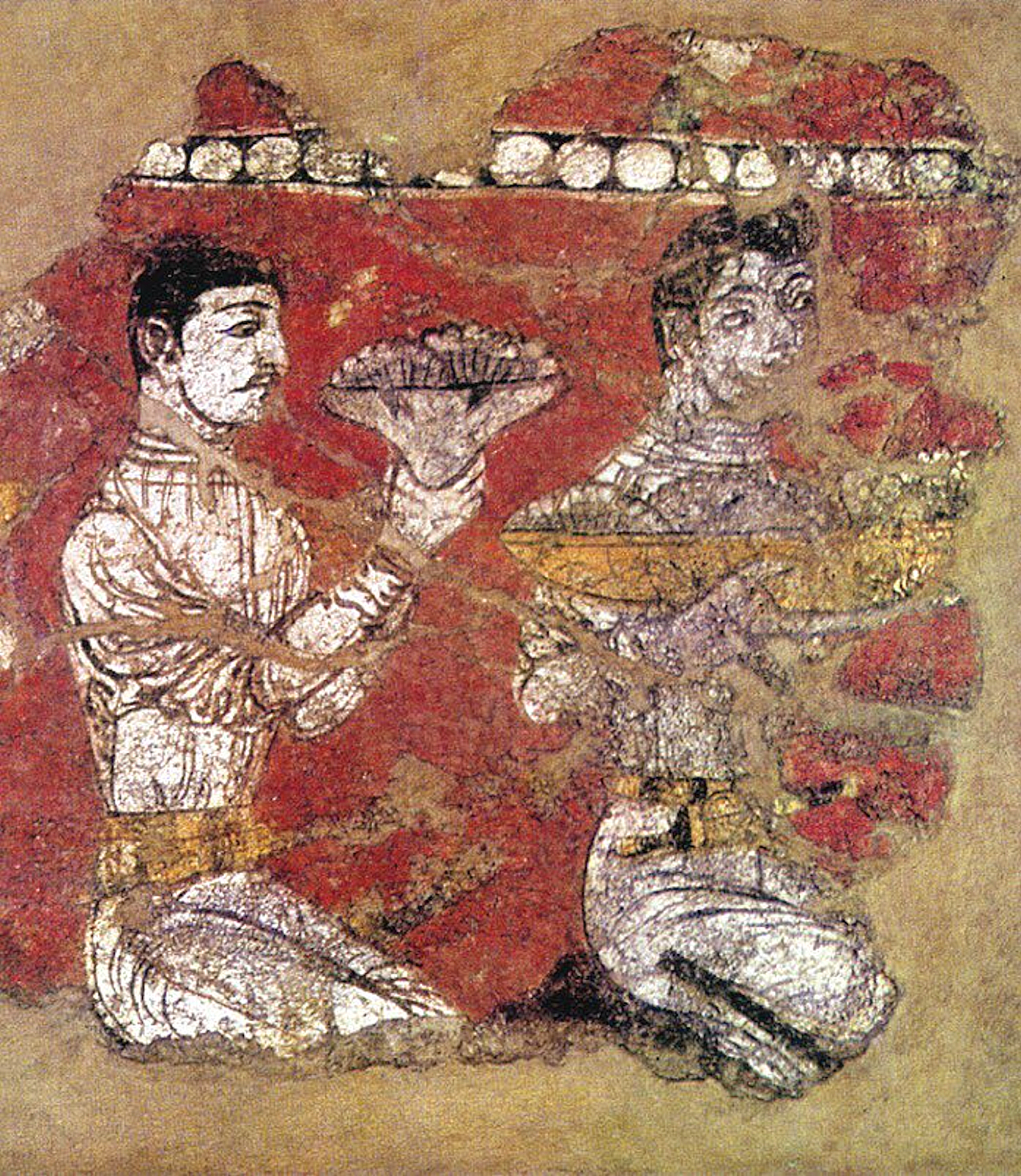
Ajina-Tepe Buddhist mural, Tajikistan, 7th-8th century CE

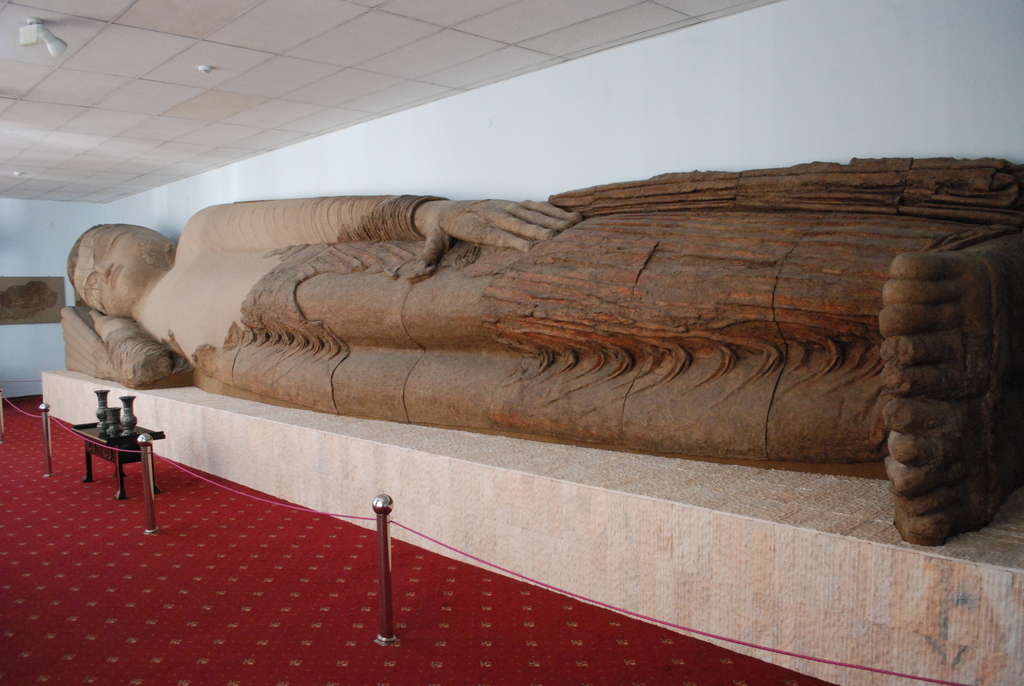
13 meter-long sleeping Buddha (Buddha in Nirvana). National Museum of Antiquities of Tajikistan

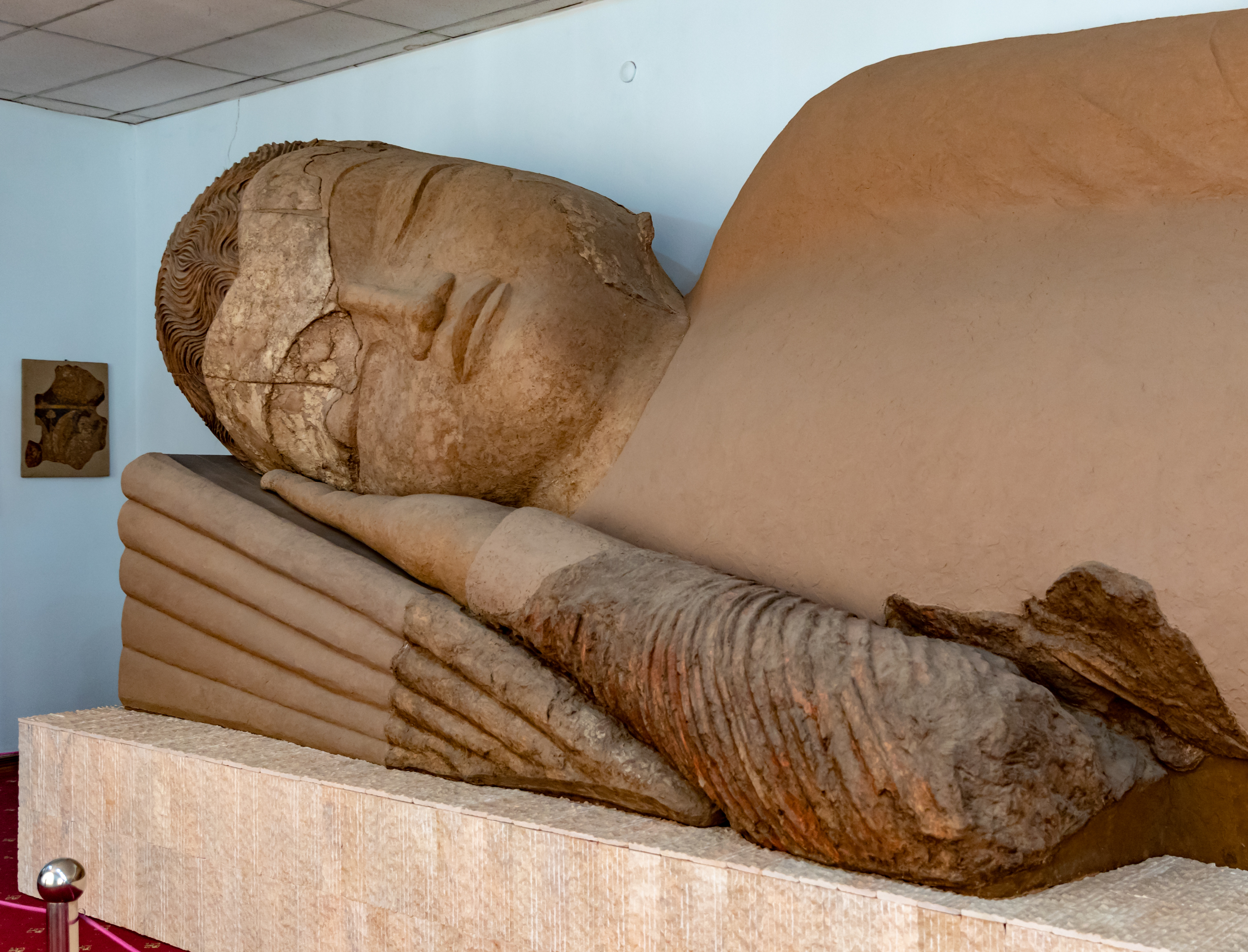
Head of the monumental reclining Buddha

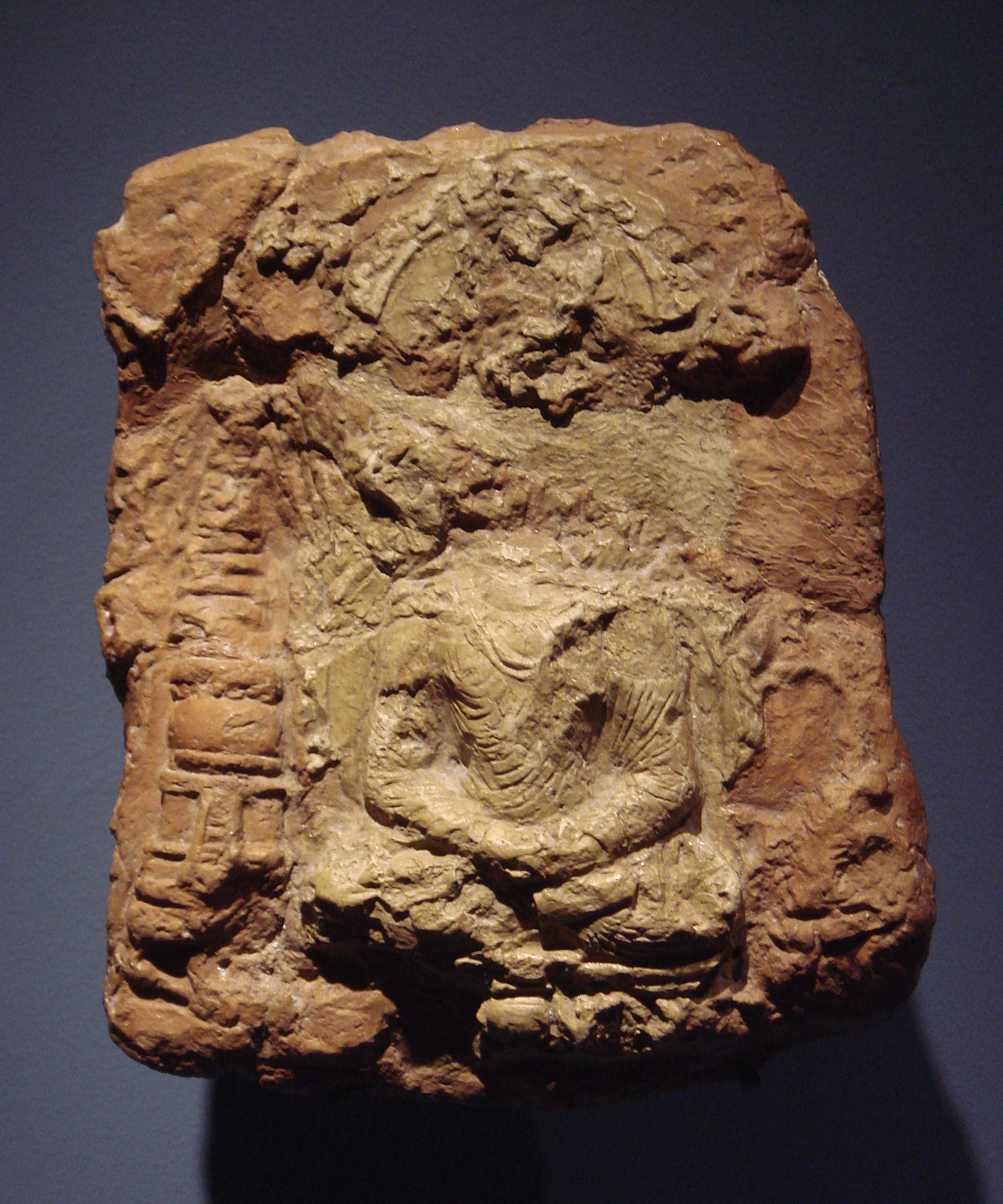
Buddha between two stupas, Ajina Tepe, Tajikistan, end of 7th century, early 8th century CE, National Museum of Antiquities of Tajikistan

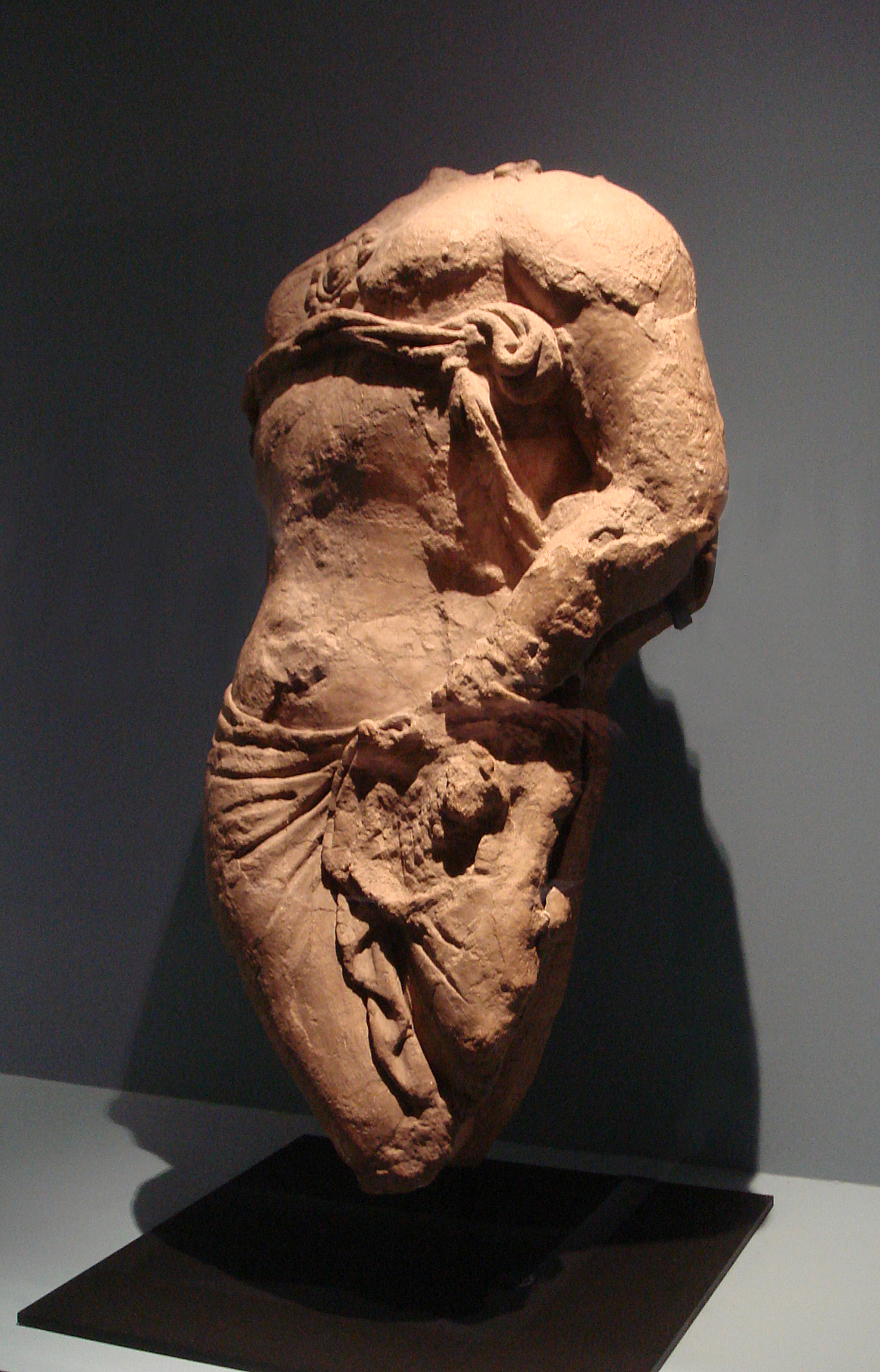
Figure of a Prince, Devata or Bodhisattva, Ajina Tepe, Tajikistan, end of 7th century, early 8th century CE, National Museum of Tajikistan.

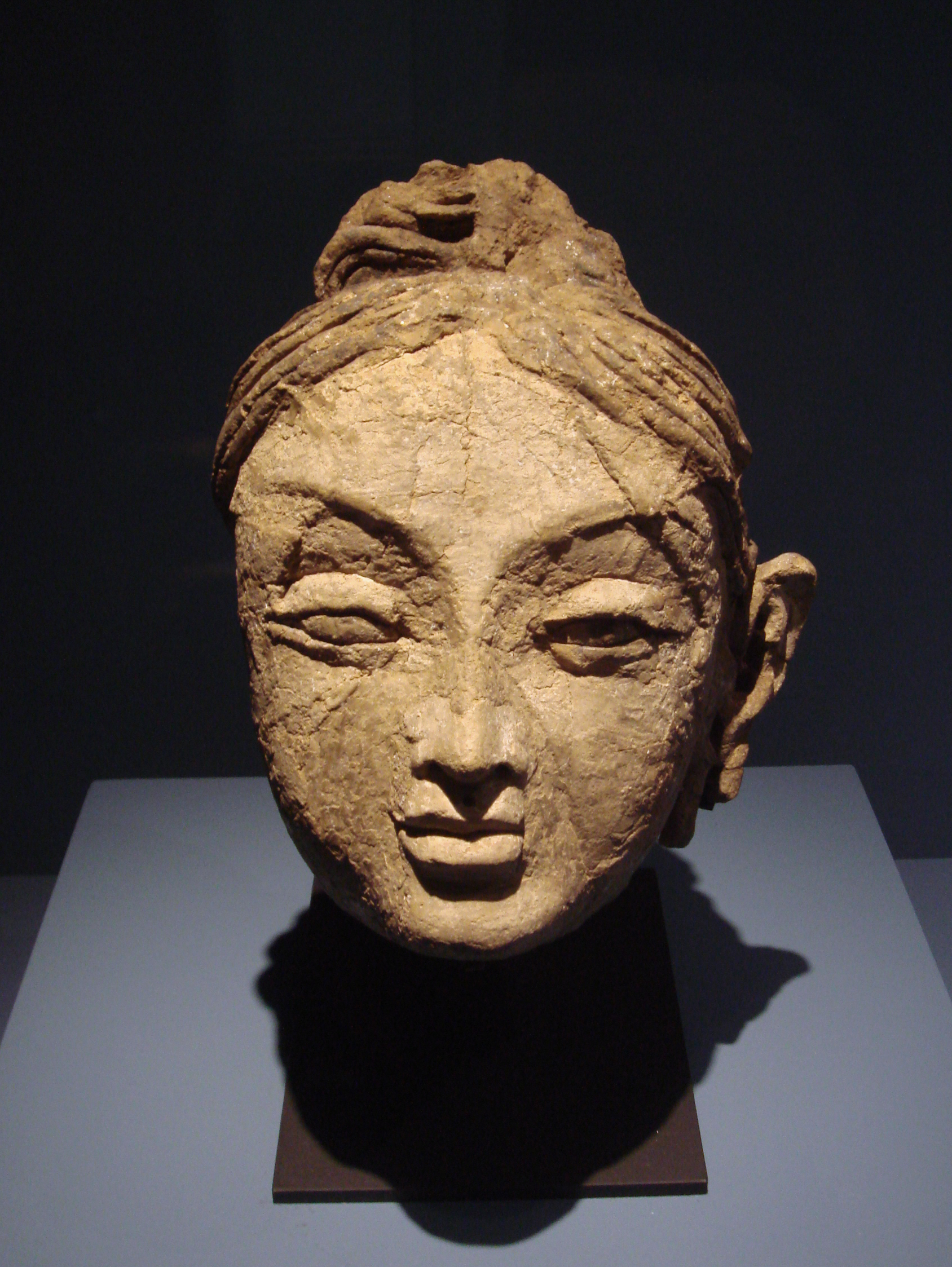
Head of a female, Ajina Tepe, Tajikistan, end of 7th century, early 8th century CE, National Museum of Antiquities of Tajikistan.

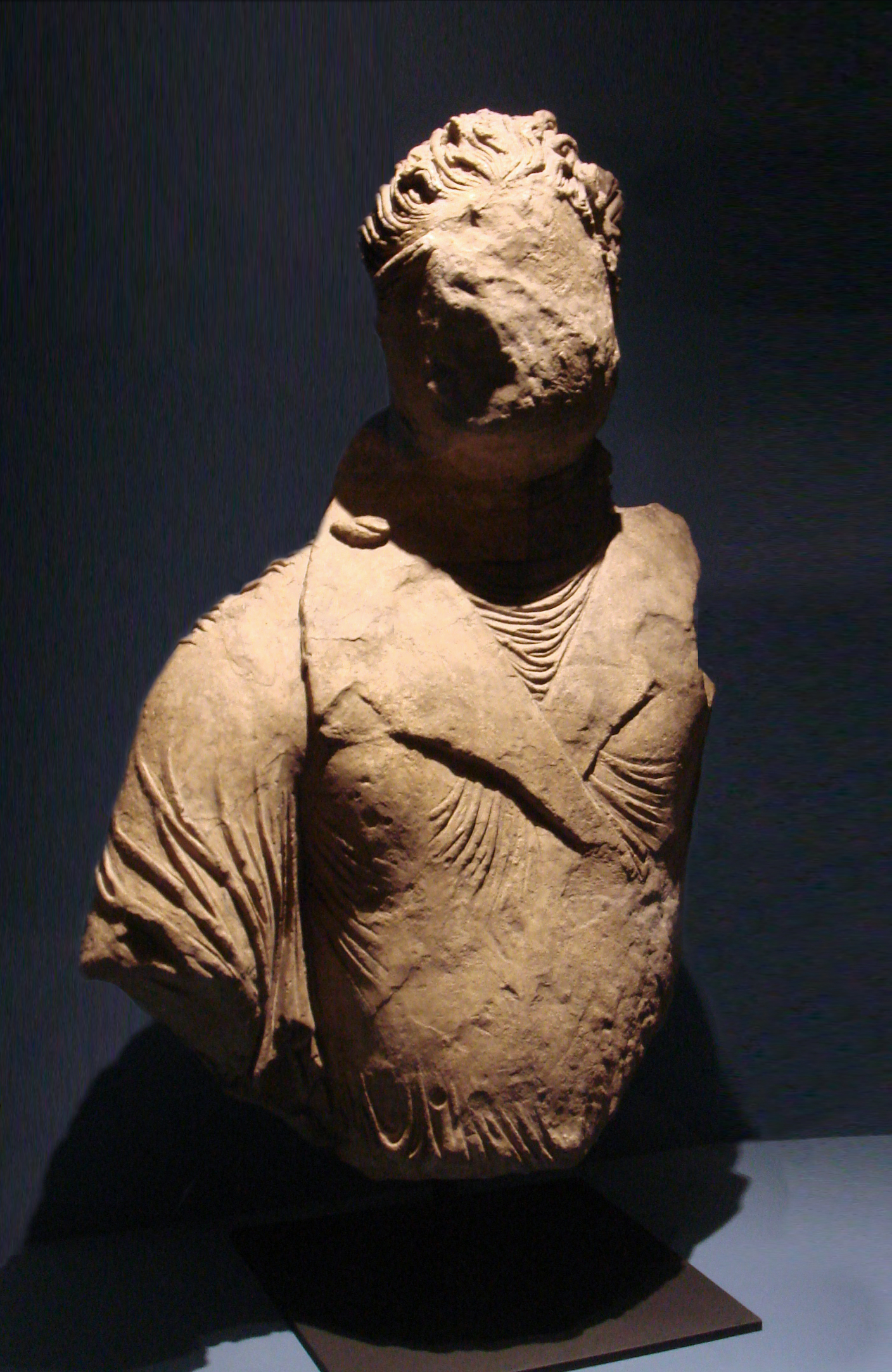
Devotee wearing a caftan, Ajina Tepe, Tajikistan, end of 7th century, early 8th century CE, National Museum of Tajikistan
