= Tajikistan National Museum =

Museum in Tajikistan

National Museum of Tajikistan
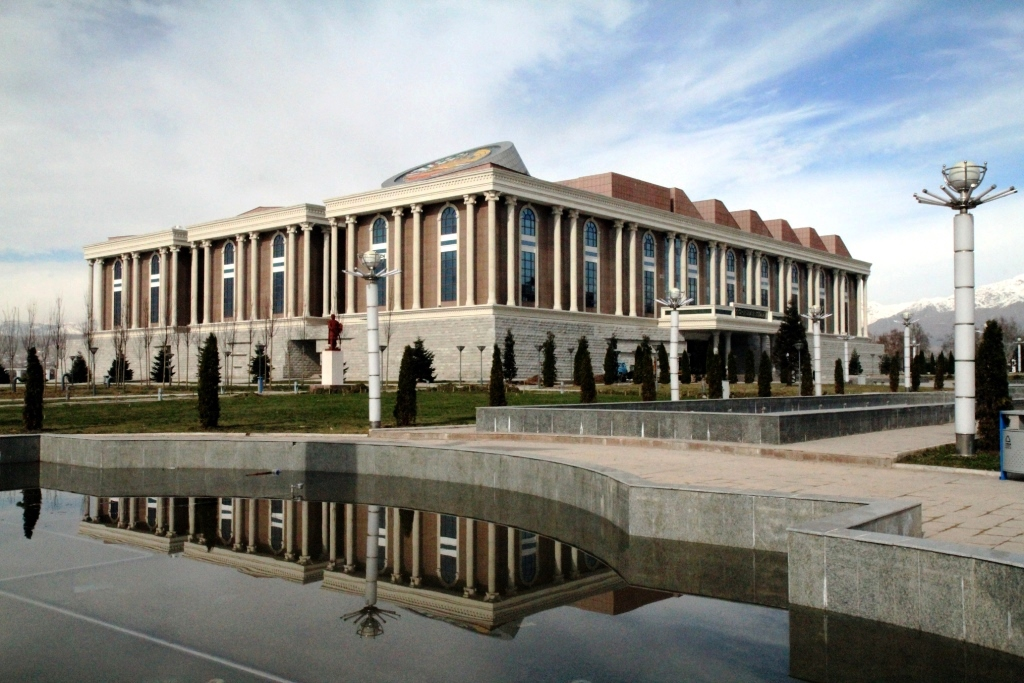
- National Museum of Tajikistan, Dushanbe.
- Established: 1934
- Location: Dushanbe
- Coordinates: 38.5634°N 68.7991°E

The National Museum of Tajikistan (Russian: Национальный музей Таджикистана, romanized: Natsionalnyy muzey Tadzhikistana; Tajik: Осорхонаи миллии Тоҷикистон, romanized: Osorkhonai Millii Tojikiston) is a museum in Dushanbe, the capital city of Tajikistan.

== Area and departments ==
The museum has a total area of 24 000 meters^{2}, of which over 15 000 m^{2} are exhibition halls. It is composed of four exhibition departments—Department of Natural History, Department of Ancient and Medieval History, Department of Modern and Contemporary History, and Department of Fine and Applied Arts.

== Gallery ==
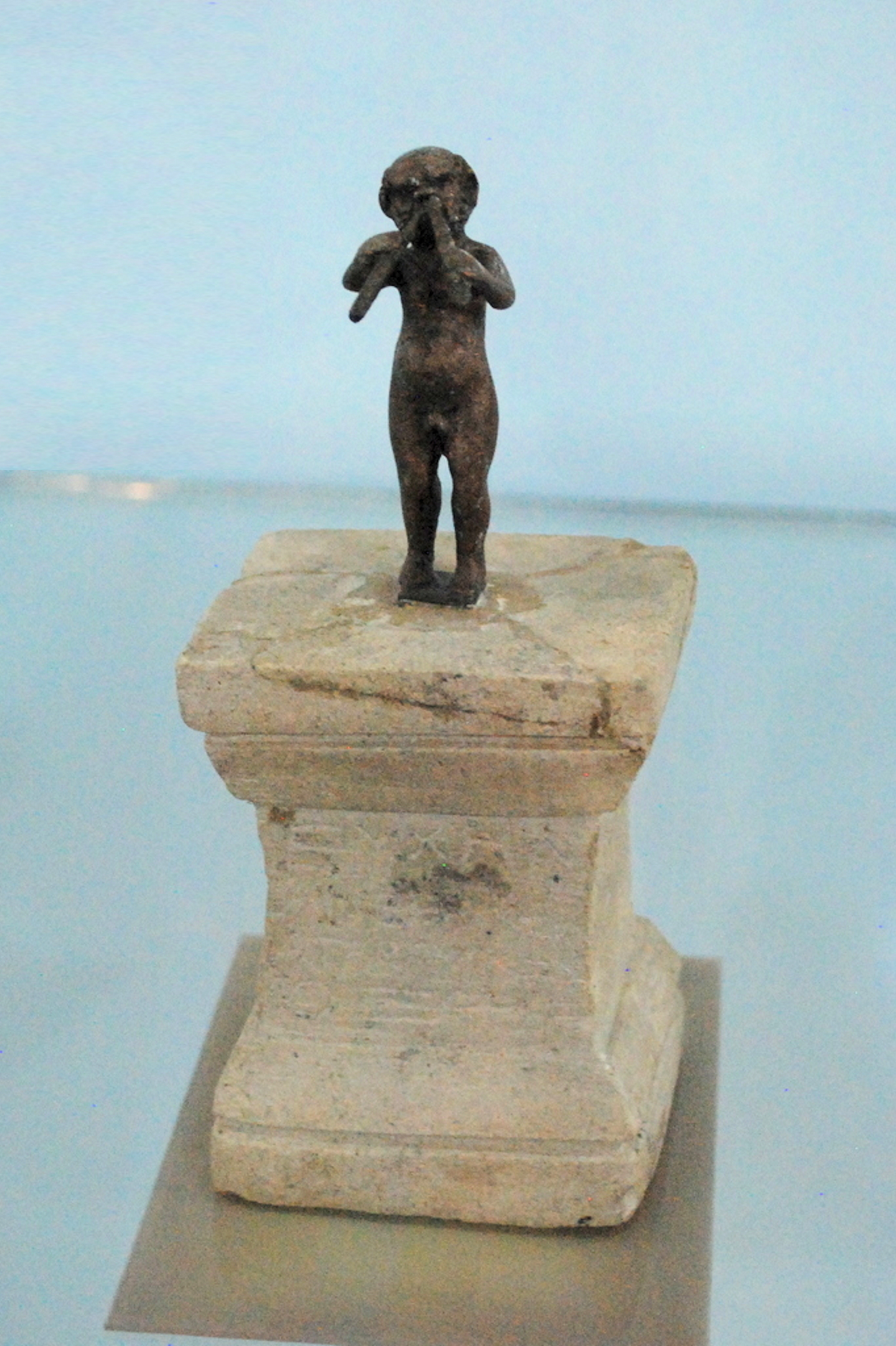
Hellenistic satyr from Takht-i Sangin. Tajikistan National Museum

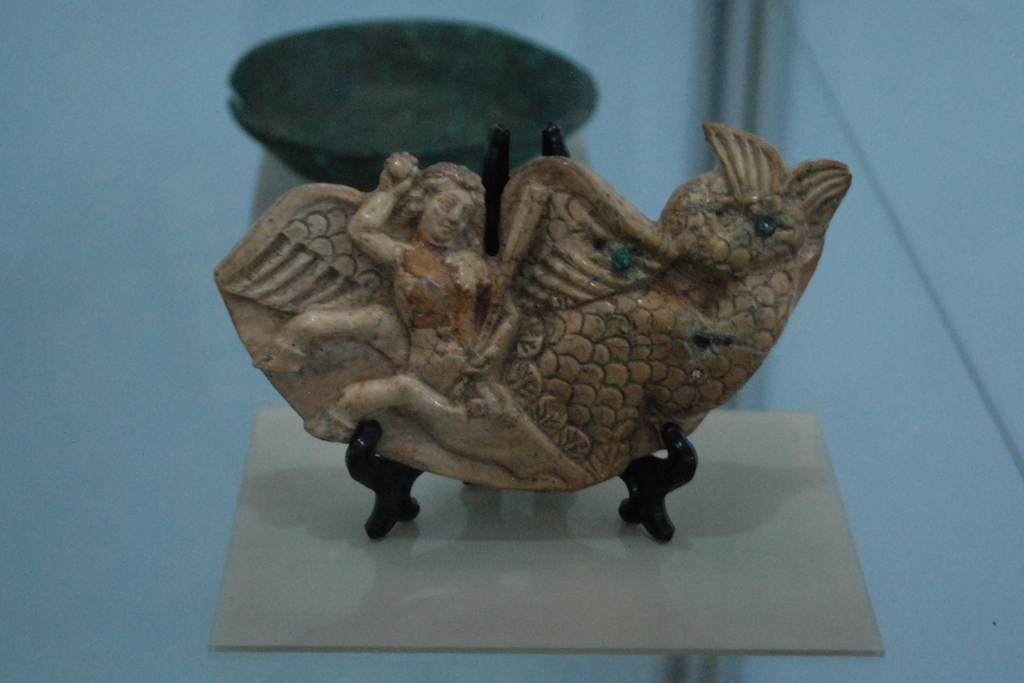
Hellenistic statuette from Takht-i Sangin, 3rd-4th century BCE, Tajikistan National Museum

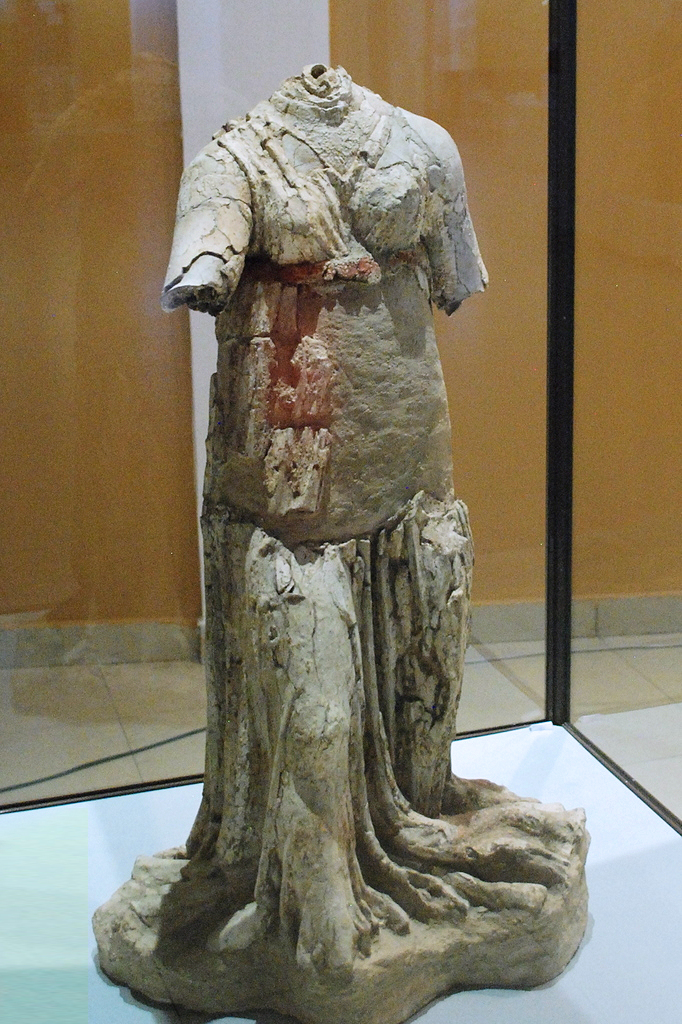
Hellenistic statuette from Takht-i Sangin, 2nd-3rd century BCE, Tajikistan National Museum

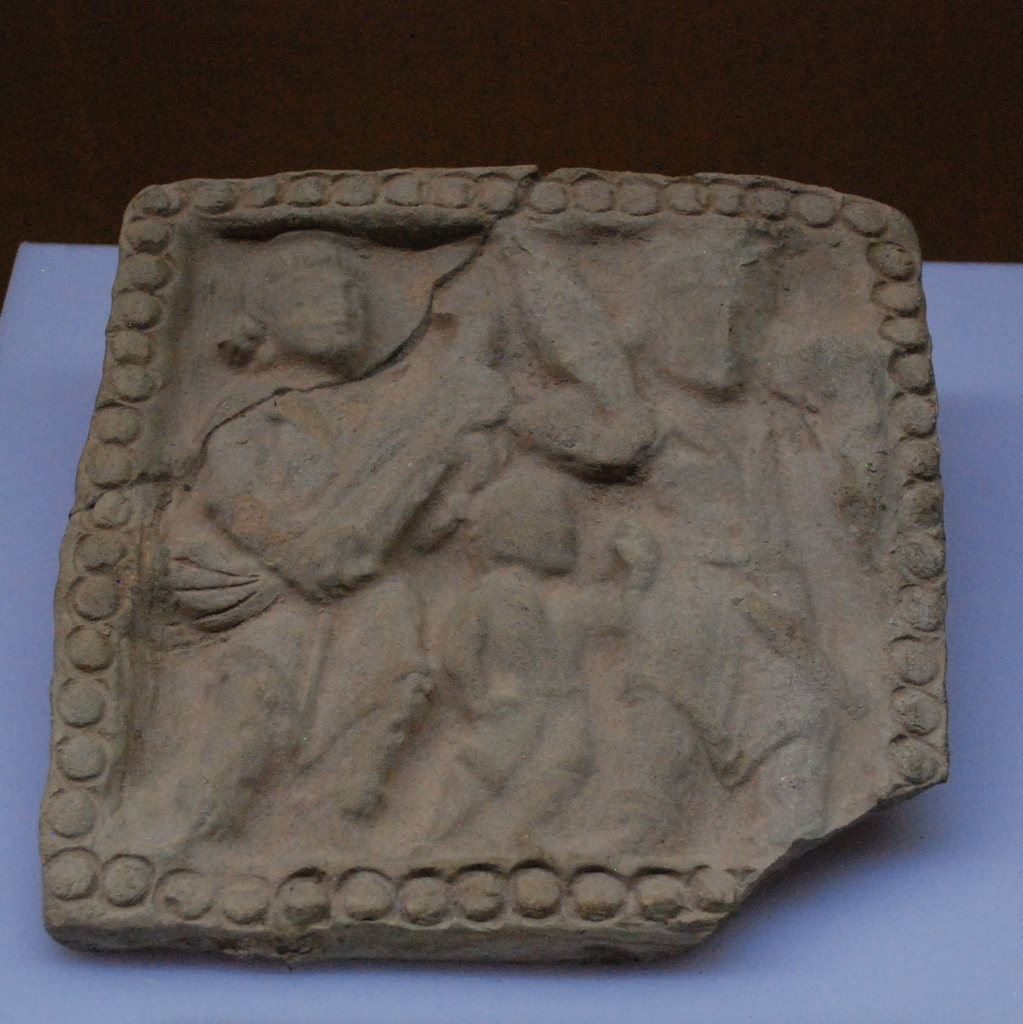
Clay Panel - Kafir-kala, 7th century CE. Tajikistan National Museum
