= Kafir-kala (Tajikistan) =

Archaeological site in Tajikistan

Coordinates: 37.588861°N 68.646444°E

Cultural Heritage Sites of Ancient Khuttal
UNESCO World Heritage Site
- Interactive map of Cultural Heritage Sites of Ancient Khuttal
- Criteria: ii, iii
- Reference: 1627-007
- Inscription: 2025 (47th Session)

Kafir-kala
(Tajikistan)

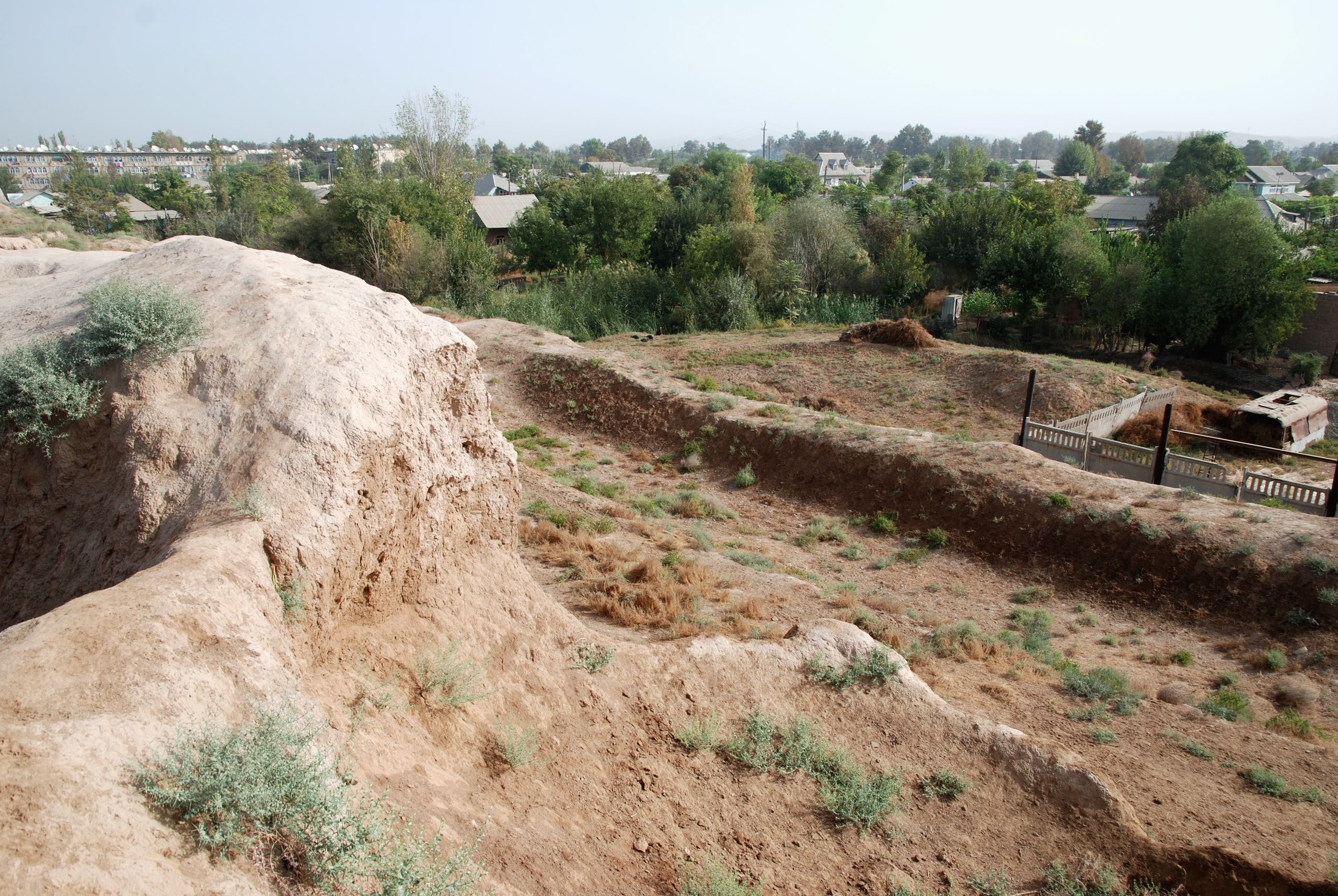
Ruins of citadel of Kafir-kala.

Location of Kafir-kala
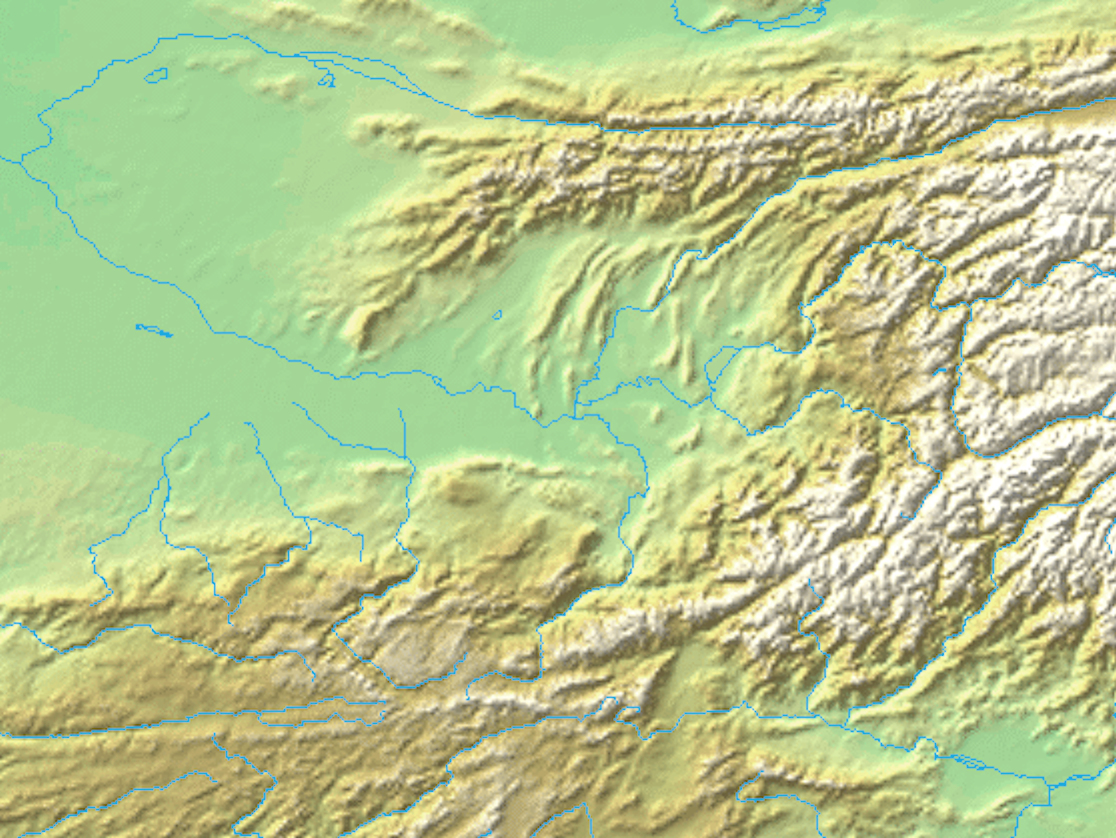
Kafir-kala (Tajikistan) (Bactria)
Kafir-kala (Tajikistan) (Tajikistan)

Kafir-kala ("Fortress of the infidels") is an ancient fortress in the Vakhsh Valley in Tajikistan.

== Fortress and Buddhist temple ==
It consists in a rectangular town surrounded by a wall with towers (360x360 meters), surrounded by a large ditch, and has one citadel (360x360 meters) in one corner, also surrounded by a wall. The citadel (70x70 meters) contained the palace of the rulers.

A Buddhist temple was found in the palace complex of the fortress as well as a Buddhist Vihara with Buddhist paintings, belonging to the "Tokharistan school of art". Inscriptions with apparently Buddhist content have also been found.

A Hephthalite inscription on a wall painting has been found at Kafir-kala.

Turkic royal families, nobility and population of the Western Turks and Tokhara Yabghus were often followers of Hinayana Buddhism in the 8th century and sponsored many of the instances of Buddhist architecture and wall-paintings, including in Kafir-kala, but also in Kala-i Kafirnigan or Ajina Tepe.

== Artefacts ==
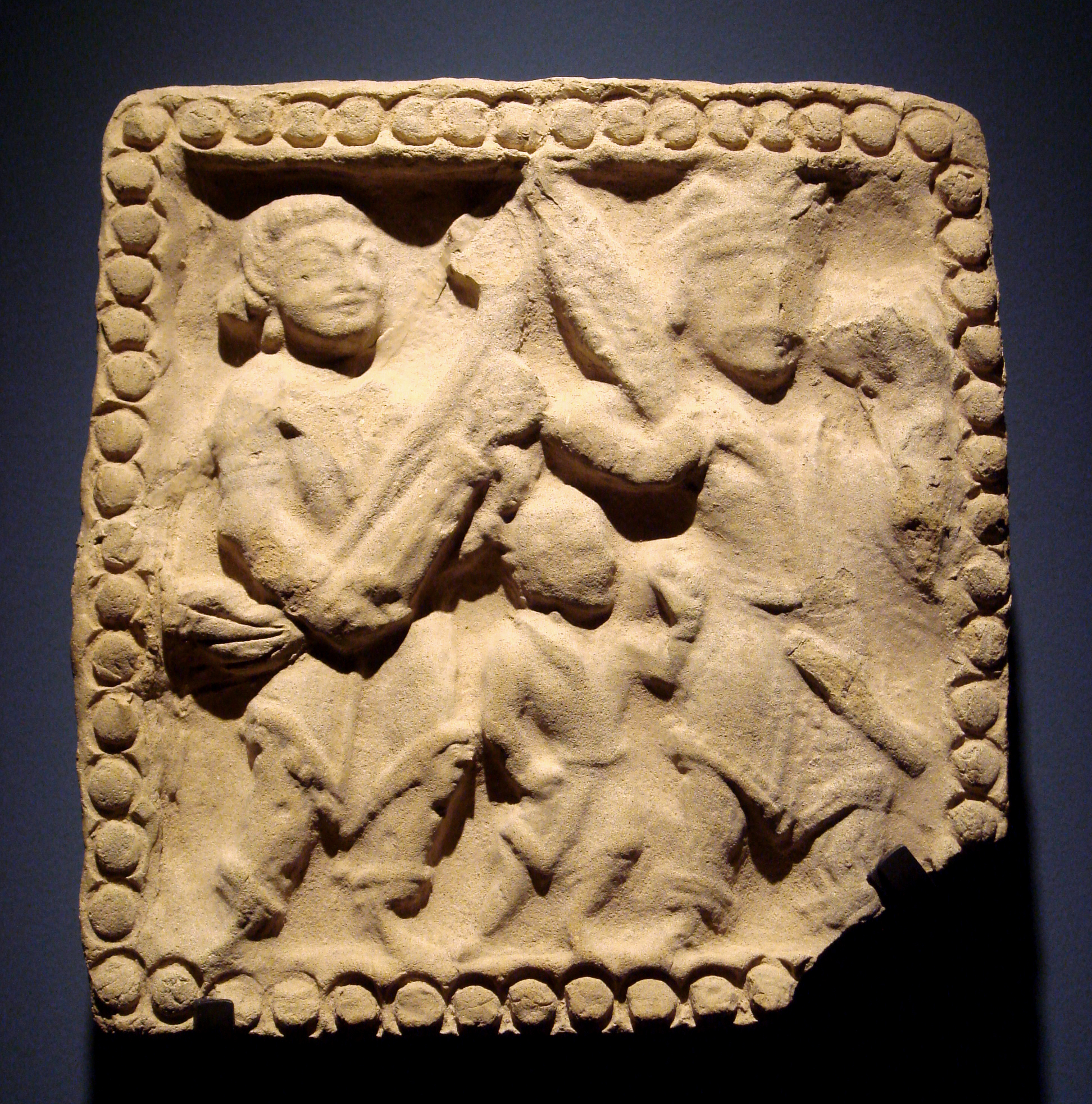
King with child and musician, Kafyr Kala, Tajikistan, 7th century CE. National Museum of Antiquities of Tajikistan.

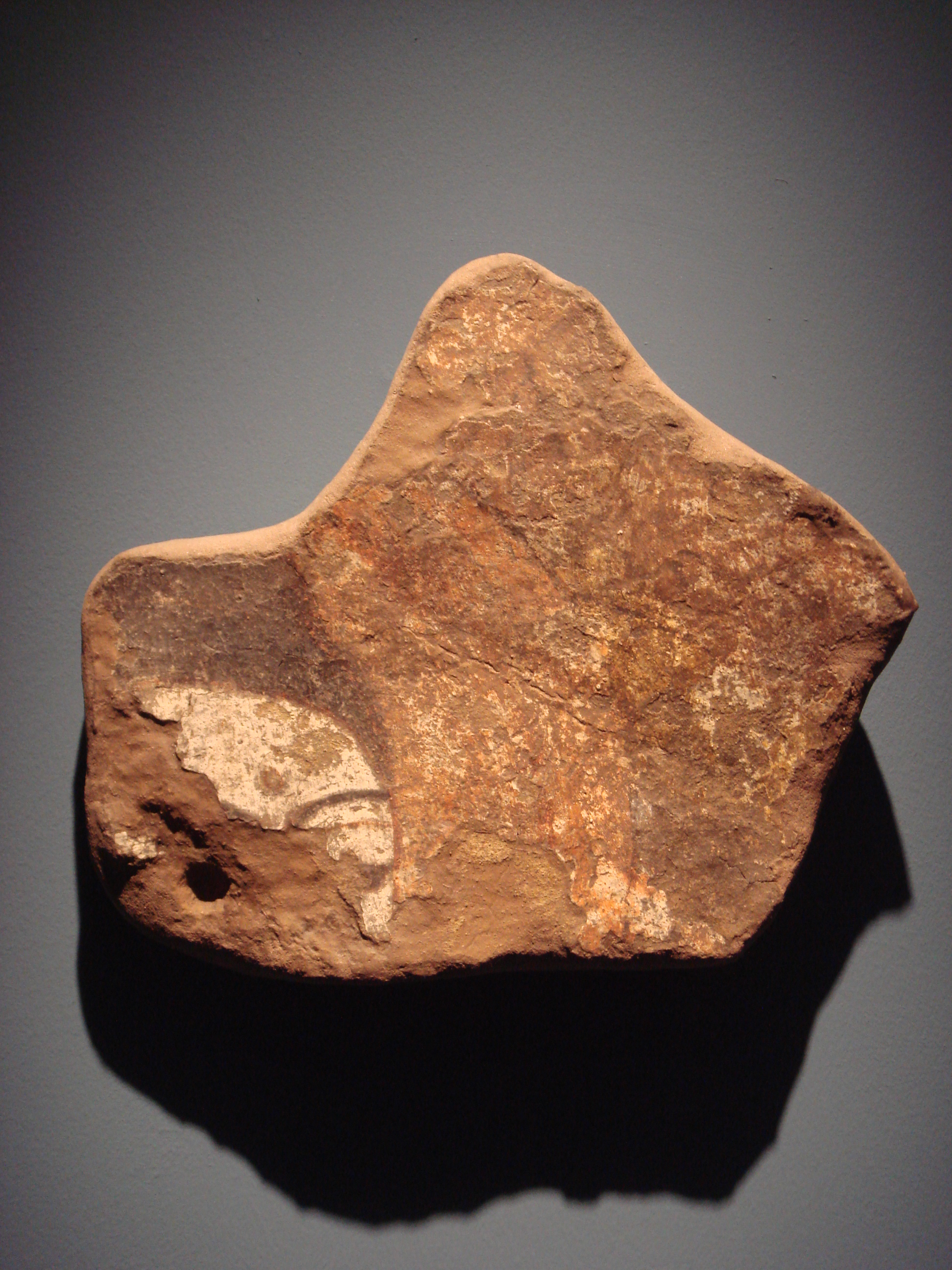
Buddha head, Kafyr Kala, Tajikistan, 7th century CE. National Museum of Antiquities of Tajikistan

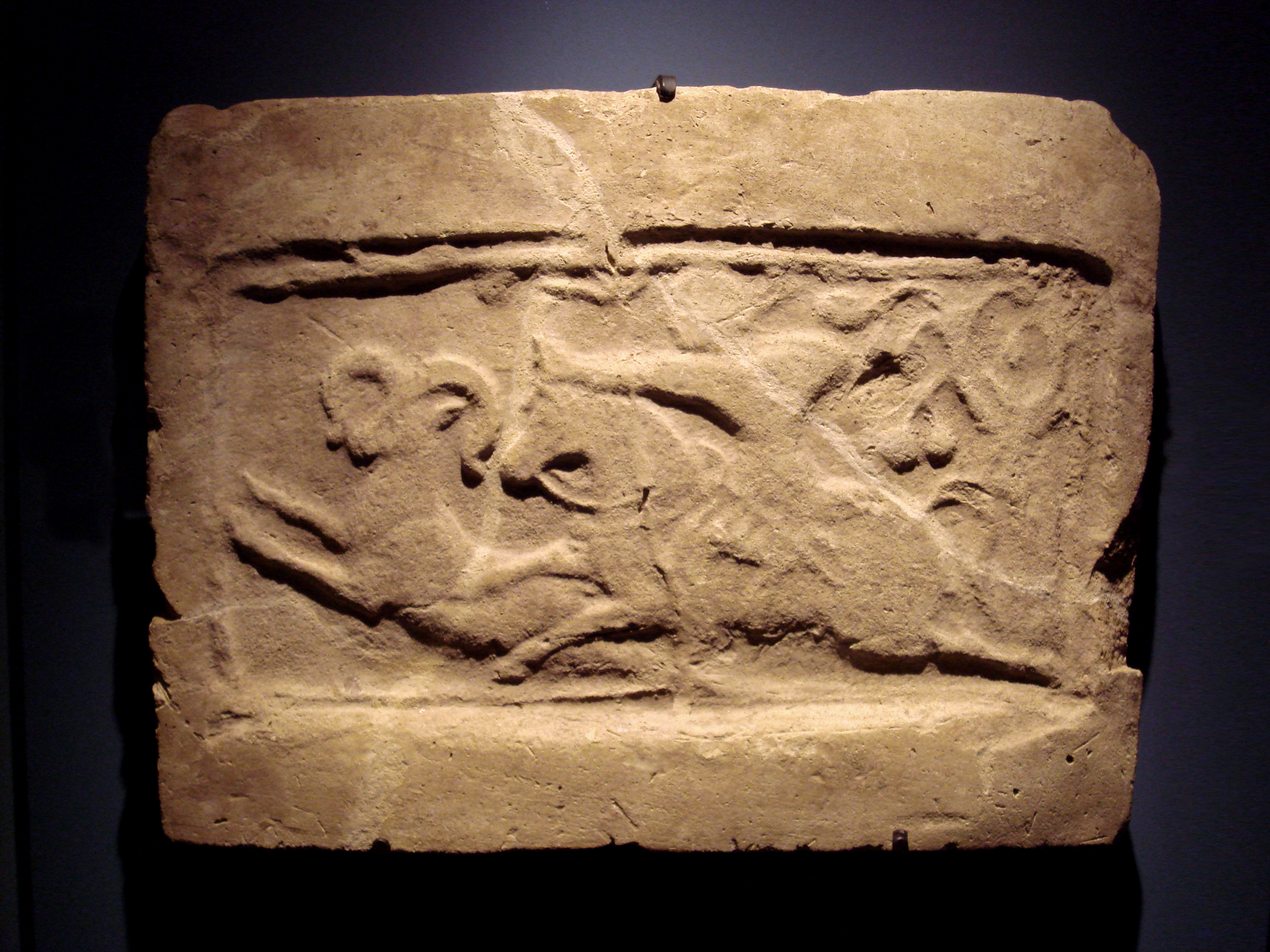
Hunting scene, Kafyr Kala, Tajikistan, 7th century CE. National Museum of Antiquities of Tajikistan

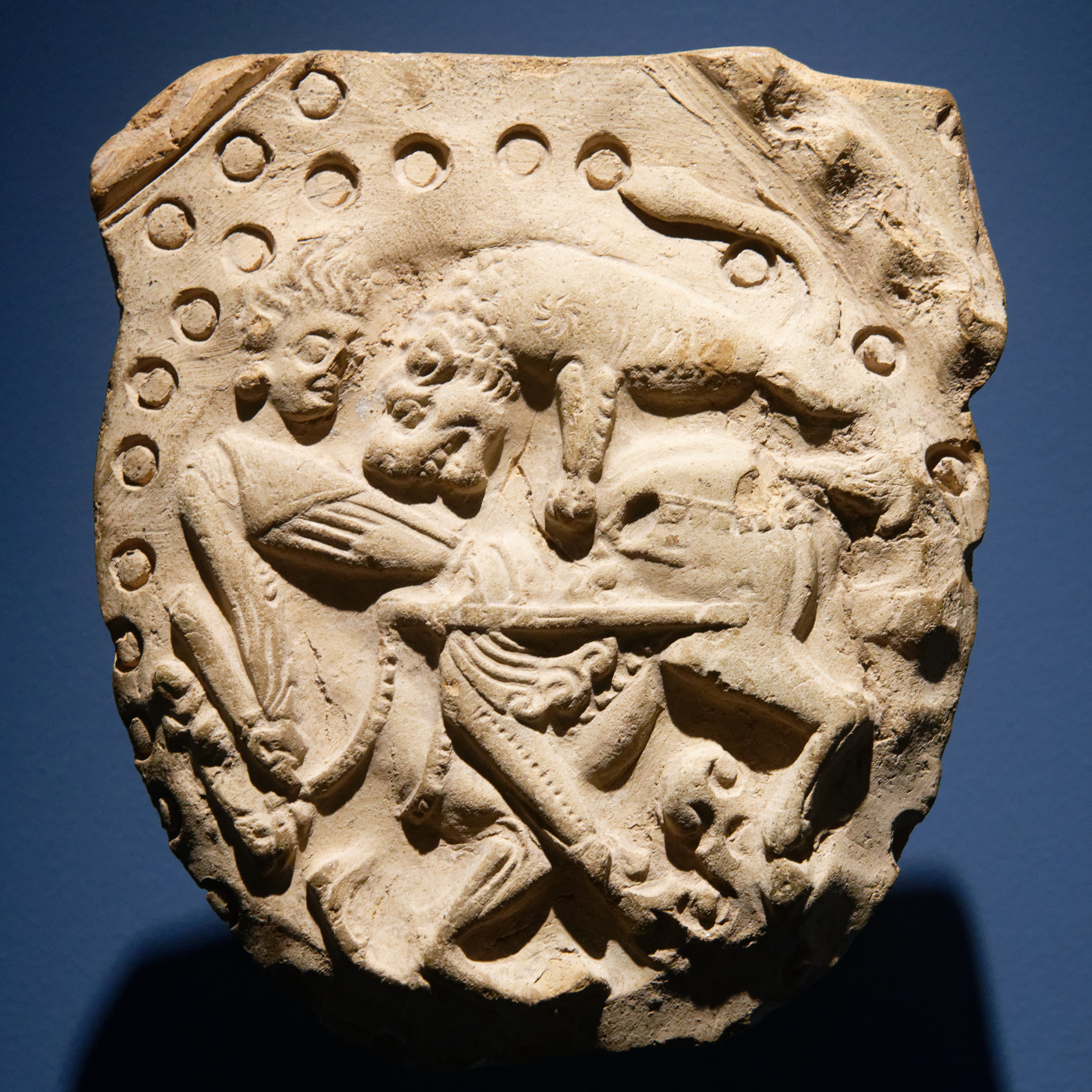
Hunting scene, Kafyr Kala, Tajikistan, 7th century CE. National Museum of Antiquities of Tajikistan

== Sources ==
- LITVINSKY, BORIS; SOLOV'EV, VIKTOR (1990). "The Architecture and Art of Kafyr Kala (Early Medieval Tokharistan)" (PDF). Bulletin of the Asia Institute. 4: 61–75. ISSN 0890-4464. JSTOR 24048351.
