= Khisht Tepe =

- Khisht Tepe
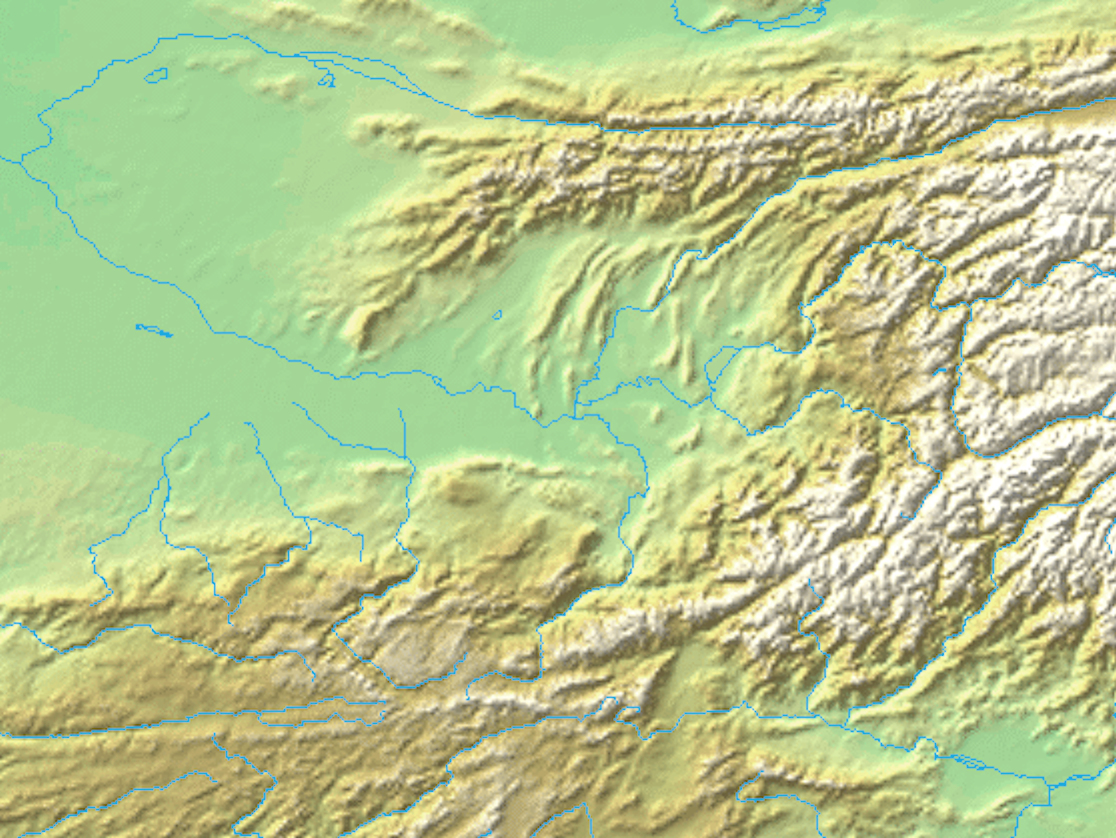
- Location within West and Central Asia Location within Bactria Location within Tajikistan
- 38.311457°N 70.024593°E
- Type: Buddhist monastery
- Location: Tajikistan

Khisht-tepe, or Khisht-tepa (“Brick hill” in Persian) is a Buddhist archaeological site located in a mountainous area on the left bank of the Obimazar-Yakshu river (tributary of the Pyandj river), in Eastern Tajikistan near the village of Khovaling. The site has the remains of a Buddhist monastery, dated to the 7th-8th centuries CE. The monastery has a square plan with a central courtyard, and small stupas inside several rooms. Clay tablets with Buddhist texts were also found.

Khisht-tepe is part of a number of Buddhist monasteries of the 7th-8th centuries such as Kafir-kala, Kala-i Kafirnigan or Ajina Tepe, which were sponsored by Turkic royal families, nobility and population of the Western Turks and Tokhara Yabghus, who were often followers of Hinayana Buddhism. The sites are characterized by Buddhist architecture and wall-paintings. A devotional tablet in Brahmi was also found, suggesting Gupta influences, as well as very degraded mural paintings.

The area was visited by Xuanzang in 631, who did not find any Buddhists there, suggesting that it developed after this date. The Korean Buddhist monk Hui Chao reported that when he visited circa 730, the population was Turkic and followed Hinayana Buddhism.
