= National Museum of Antiquities of Tajikistan =

Museum in Dushanbe, Tajikistan

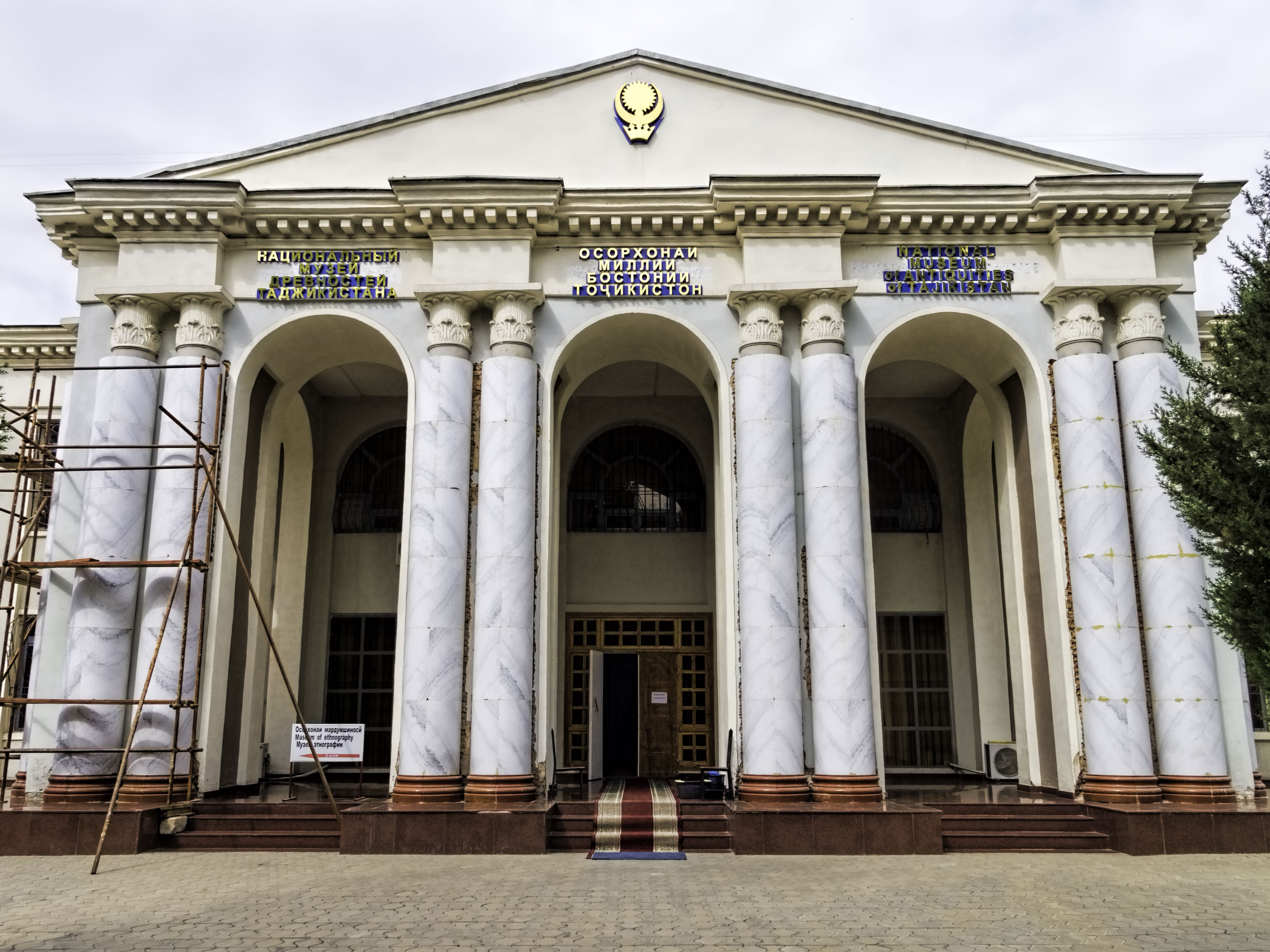
National Museum of Antiquities, Dushanbe, Tajikistan

The Tajikistan National Museum of Antiquities (Russian: Национальный музей древностей Таджикистана, romanized: Natsionalʹnyy muzey drevnostey Tadzhikistana; Tajik: Осорхонаи миллии бостоншиносии Тоҷикистон, romanized: Osorkhonai millii bostonshinosii Tojikiston) is a museum in Dushanbe, Tajikistan. It is particularly famous for its murals from Penjikent.

== Artifacts ==
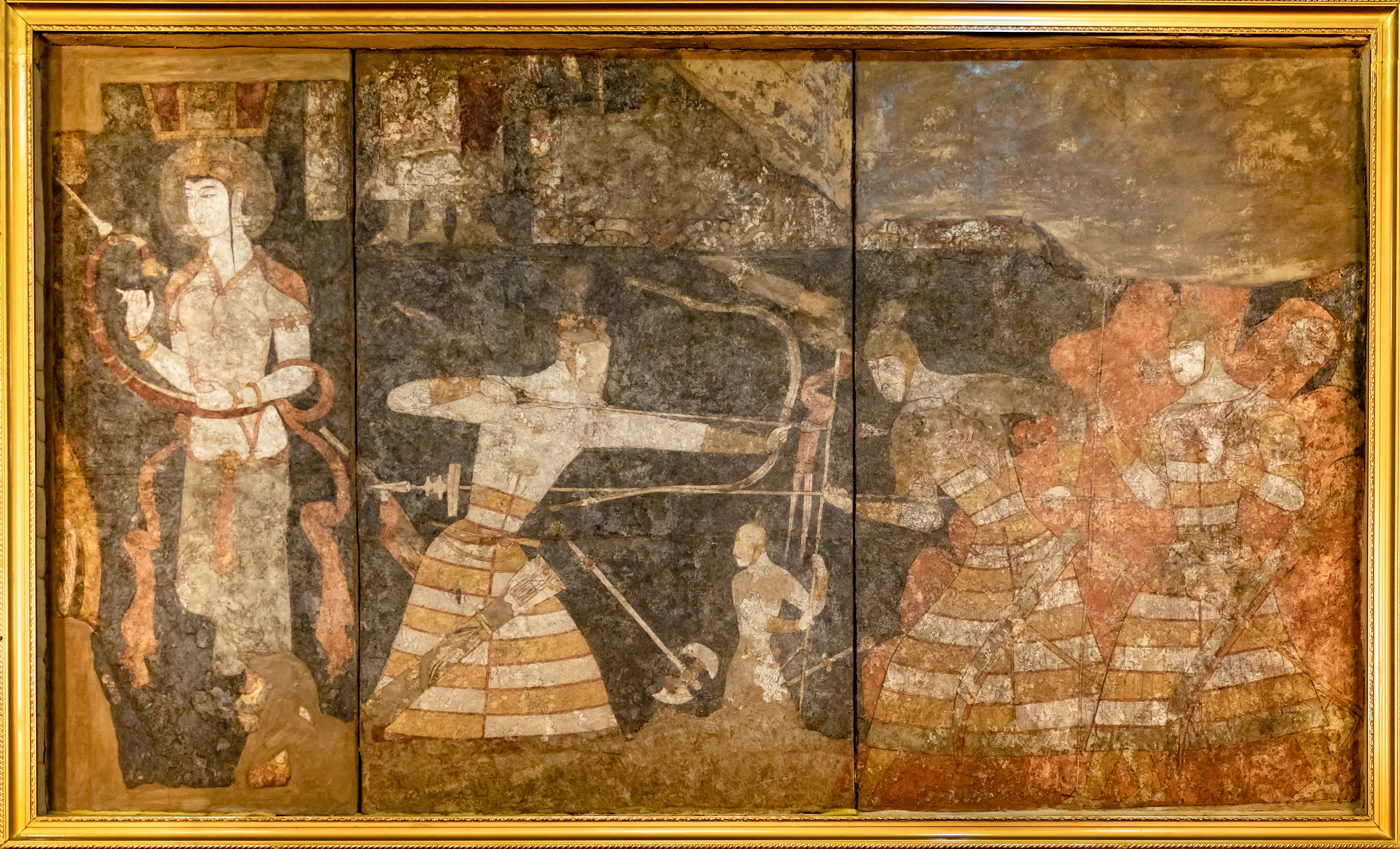
Penjikent mural

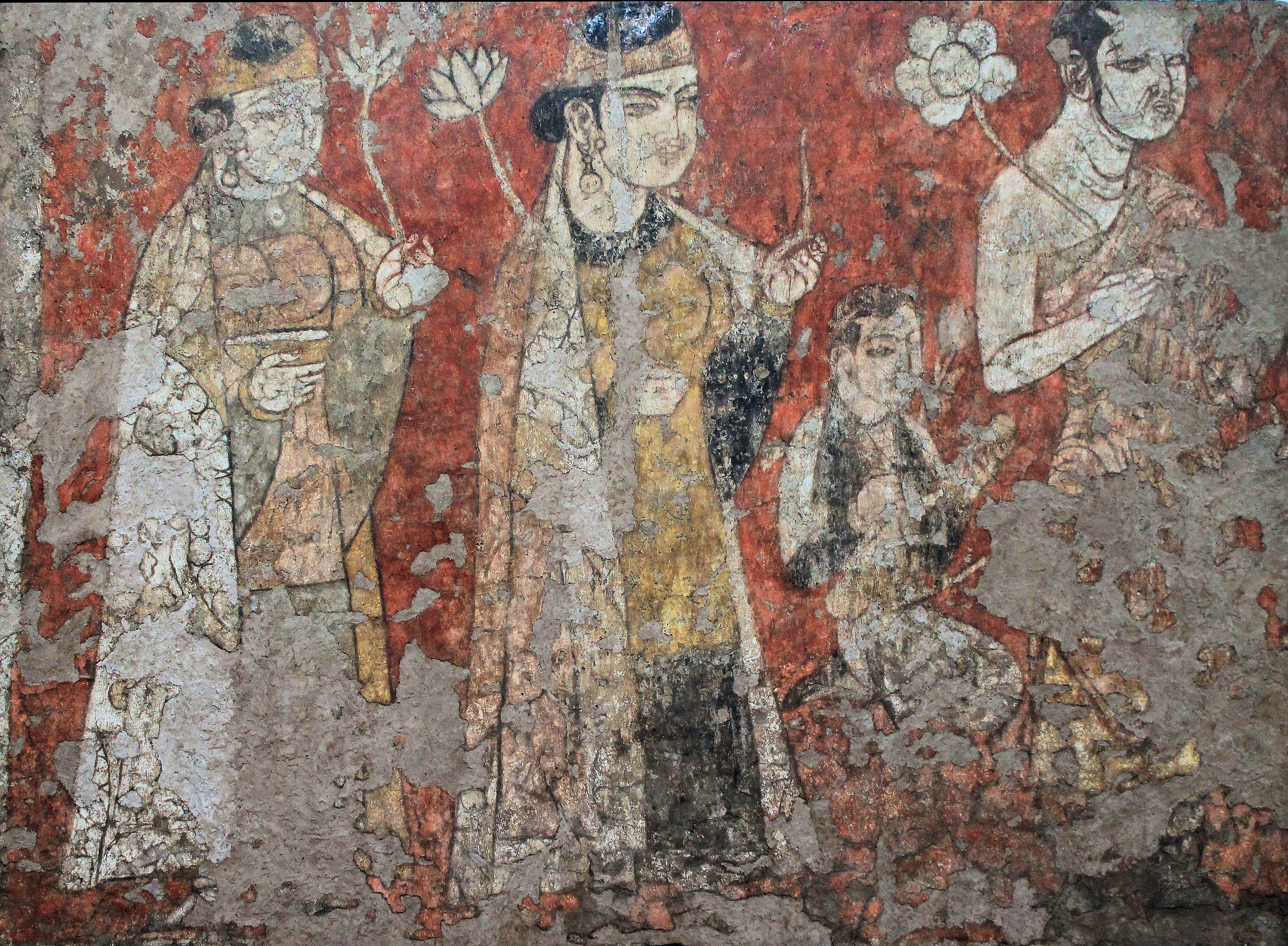
Mural from Kalai Kafirnigan.

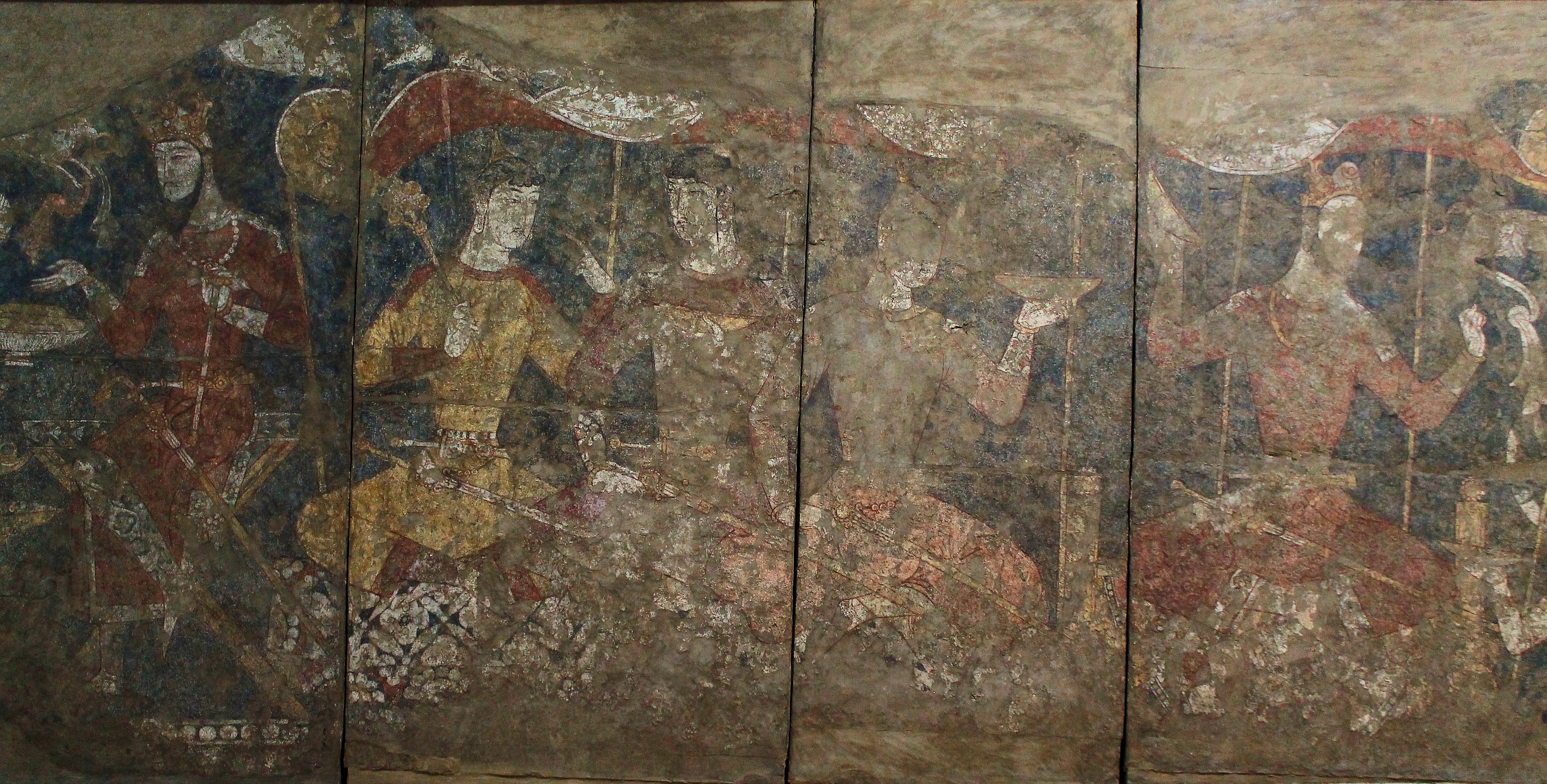
Mural from Penjikent

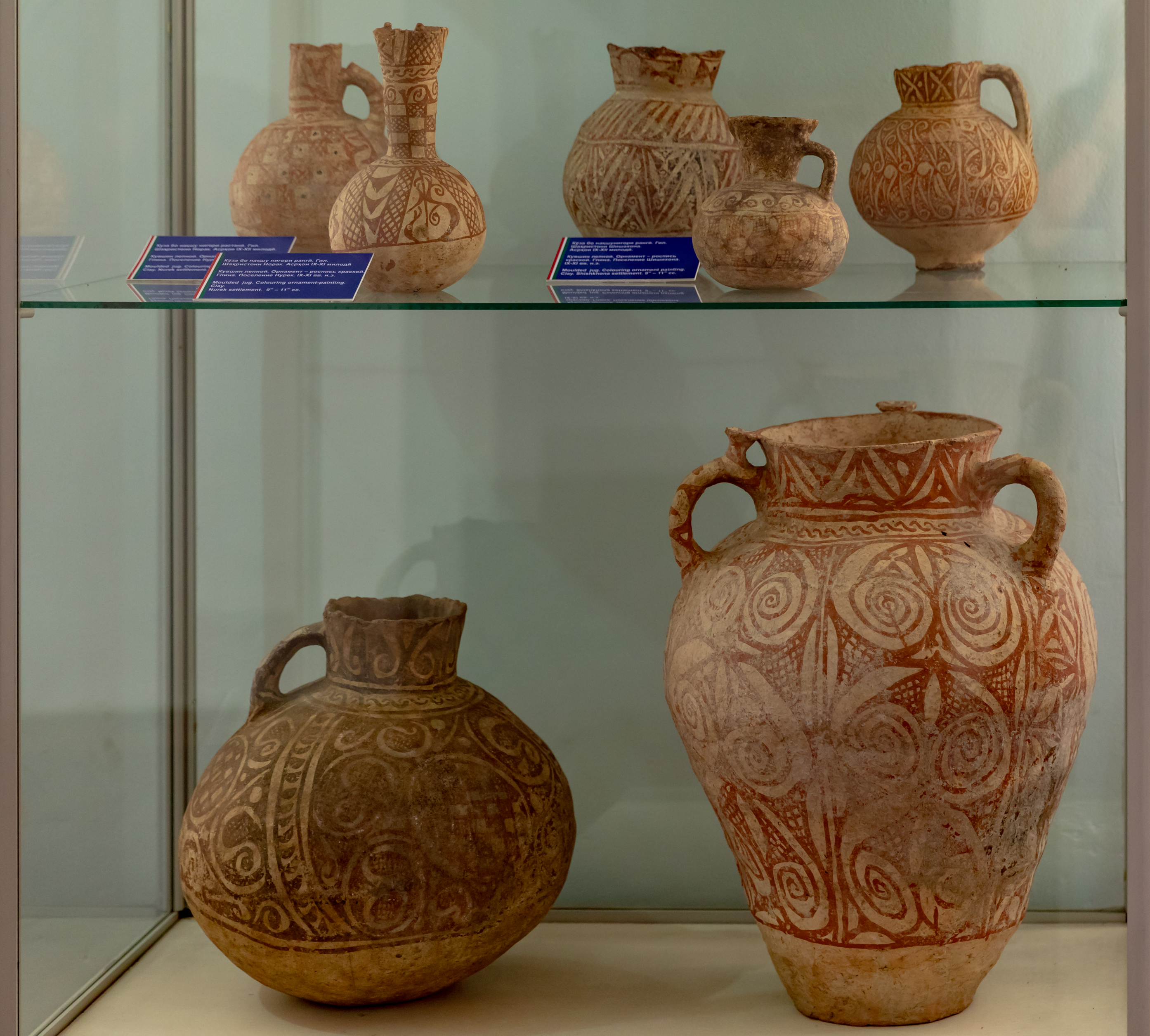
Decorated potteries

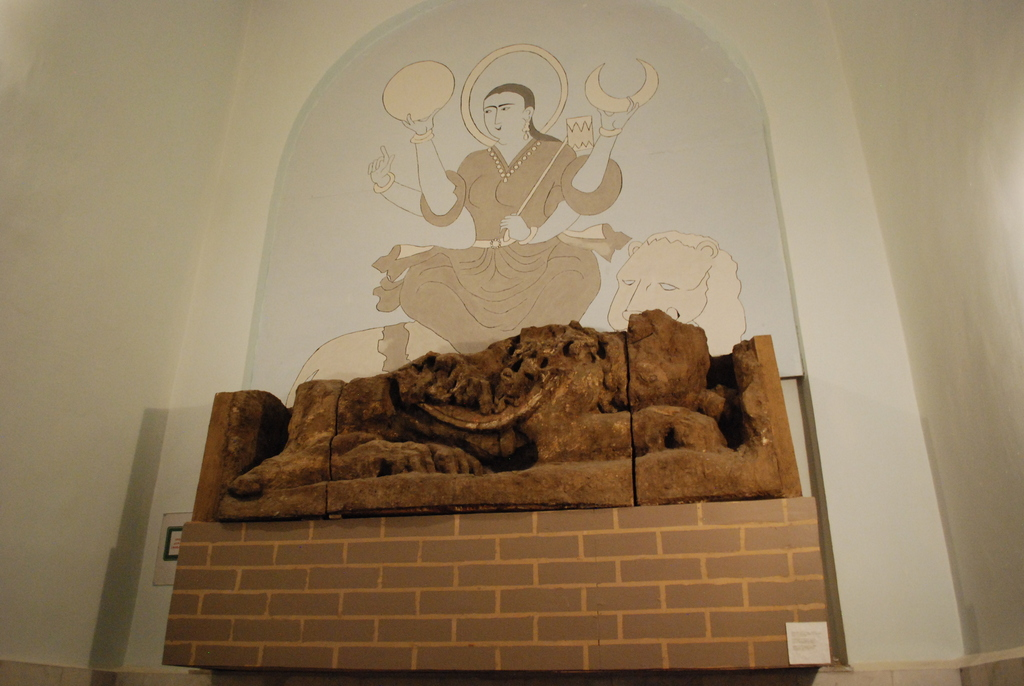
Lion and Goddess Nana, Penjikent, 6th-8th c CE

== See also ==
- Buddha in Nirvana, on display in the museum
