= List of Heroes of Uzbekistan =

This is a list of people awarded the title Hero of Uzbekistan.

== List of recipients ==
Date	Name	Occupation	References
5 May 1994	Islam Karimov	President of Uzbekistan	
30 August 1995	Erkin Alimuhamedov	Fitter-assembler at the V. P. Chkalov Tashkent Aviation Production Association	
30 August 1995	Komiljon Mamajonov	Foreman of the Maroziqov Farm in Fergana Region	
30 August 1995	Anatoly Panin	Foreman of excavator operators of the Sharq Mine of the Navoiy Mining and Metallurgical Plant	
30 August 1995	Boʻron Roʻziyev	Oil and gas production operator of the Muborakgas gas field of Uzneftegazqazibchiqarish JSC	
30 August 1995	Muyassar Temirova	Senior foreman of the Section for the Production of Highly Artistic Products of Zarduz JSC in Bukhara	
26 August 1996	Sodiqjon Abdurasulov	Foreman of grain growers of the Oltin Vodiy Farm in Andijan Region	
26 August 1996	Mirumar Asadov	Restorer at the Samarkand Special Scientific Restoration Production Workshop	
26 August 1996	Ayshaxon Qoʻchqorova	Worker of the Namangan Regional Maternity Hospital	
26 August 1996	Nikolay Kucherskiy	Chairman of the Qizilqum State Concern of Rare Metals and Gold	
26 August 1996	Ibrohim Fayzullayev	Chairman of the Sobir Rahimov Farm in Surxondaryo Region	
26 August 1997	Manzura Madaliyeva	Mathematics teacher at Secondary School No. 10 in Kokand, Fergana Region	
26 August 1997	Onesiya Saitova	Head of the Gynecological Department of Maternity Hospital No. 1 in Karakalpakstan	
26 August 1997	Xolxoʻja Umarov	Foreman of plasterers of Construction Department No. 42 of Toshmaxsuspardozqurilish JSC	
26 August 1997	Masharip Quvaqov	Chairman of the Board of the Bogot Farm	
26 August 1998	Parda Ziyatov	Foreman of the cotton-growing brigade of the Hamroqul Nosirov Farm	
26 August 1998	Qobiljon Obidov	Hokim of Andijan Region	
26 August 1998	Abdulla Oripov	Poet	
26 August 1998	Jonsaid Turdiyev	Excavator operator at the Qalmoqqir Mine	
26 August 1998	Anvar Qurbonov	Foreman of Mobile Mechanized Column No. 49 of the Sirdaryojamqurilish JSC	
3 August 1999	Doʻstmurod Abdullayev	Foreman of the Roʻziqul Maxmanov Farm in Samarkand Region	
3 August 1999	Abduvali Abdurahimov	Foreman of the Fifth Anniversary of Independence of Uzbekistan Farm in Namangan Region	
3 August 1999	Otaxon Alamatov	Foreman of the U. Qoraboyev Farm in Andijan Region	
3 August 1999	Gʻaybullo Rahmonov	Tenant of the Sharof Rashidov Farm in Qashqadaryo Region	
25 August 1999	Erkin Vohidov	Poet	
25 August 1999	Mavluda Ismatova	Director of Secondary School No. 273 in Tashkent	
25 August 1999	Martiya Rahmatova	Spinner at Factory No. 1 of Buxoroteks JSC	
25 August 1999	Said Ahmad Husanxoʻjayev	Writer	
25 August 1999	Ulugʻbek Umarov	Scraper operator of the Fergana Operational Department of Highways	
25 August 2000	Hazrat Obloqulov	Main contractor of the Sadriddin Ayni Farm in Bukhara Region	
25 August 2000	Bekturdi Jumaniyozov	Main contractor of the Uzbekistan Farm in Khorazm Region	
25 August 2000	Yursinboy Joʻrayev	Main contractor of the B. Otaqulov Farm in Fergana Region	
23 August 2001	Rahmon Muhammadiyev	Chief physician of the Regional Hospital of Eye Diseases in Surxondaryo Region	
23 August 2001	Qobul Moʻminov	Blacksmith at the Muborak Gas Processing Plant	
23 August 2001	Vera Pak	Director of House of Mercy No. 20 in Khiva	
23 August 2001	Tojiboy Rizayev	Chairman of the Board of the Zarkent Farm	
23 August 2001	Allaniyoz Uteniyozov	Head of the Saxovat Farm in Karakalpakstan	
23 August 2002	Dilbar Akramova	Chairman of the Board of the Namangan Regional Branch of the Mehr-Shafqat va Salomatlik Foundation	
23 August 2002	Islom Bobojonov	Hokim of Khorazm Region	
23 August 2002	Marat Zokirov	Director of the Lyceum for Gifted Children at the Jizzakh State Pedagogical Institute	
23 August 2002	Azim Latipov	Chairman of the Buxoro Farm in Bukhara Region	
23 August 2002	Murodullo Saidov	Chairman of the Jeynov Farm in Qashqadaryo Region	
23 August 2002	Ozod Sharafiddinov	Editor-in-Chief of the Jahon Adabiyoti magazine	
25 August 2003	Abdurahmon Abdurazzoqov	Operator of the steelmaking shop in Uzmetkombinat	
25 August 2003	Zikir Muhammadjonov	Actor of the Uzbek National Academic Drama Theater	
25 August 2003	Axmat Narzulloyev	Chairman of the Lochin Farm in Surxondaryo Region	
25 August 2003	Serikbay Sagatov	Chief shepherd of the Birlik Farm in Navoiy Region	
25 August 2003	Avaz Ergashev	Chairman of the Xoʻjam Nizamatov Farm in Samarkand Region	
25 August 2003	Toʻlepbergen Qayipbergenov	Writer	
25 August 2004	Toʻlqin Ibragimov	Locomotive driver in Uzbek Railways	
25 August 2004	Anor Mahmudova	Director of Ibn Sino School No. 5 in Khorazm Region	
25 August 2004	Abduraim Homidov	Contractor at the Oʻzbekiston Farm in Namangan Region	
25 August 2004	Ibroyim Yusupov	Poet	
25 August 2005	Agʻitay Adilov	Chairman of the Board of the Taxtakoʻpir Farm in Karakalpakstan	
25 August 2005	Botir Temirov	Mechanic of Technological Shop No. 1 of Fergana Oil Refinery	
25 August 2006	Abdugʻani Abdullayev	Master wood carver	
25 August 2006	Malika Abdullaxoʻjayeva	Director of the State Anatomical Pathology Center	
25 August 2006	Bahodir Ilyasov	Track fitter at Uzbekistan Railways	
25 August 2006	Same Samatov	Director of the Academic Lyceum at Gulistan State University	
25 August 2006	Gulmat Haytmetov	Head of the Hayitimmat Ota Farm in Khorazm Region	
22 August 2007	Hamza Mahkamov	Machinist at Uzbekistan Railways	
24 August 2007	Toir Dadaxonov	Foreman of a group of fitters and welders at the 12-Qurilish Tresti Company	
24 August 2007	Xalchaxon Mirzayeva	Head of the Xadicha Aya Farm in Namangan Region	
24 August 2007	Saydali Raxmanov	Excavator operator at the Qalmoqqir quarry of Olmaliq Mining and Metallurgical Plant	
24 August 2007	Zarxoʻja Saidazimov	Flight instructor at Uzbekistan Airways	
26 August 2008	Siyosatxon Abdullayeva	Head of the Oltinkoʻl Vodiy Gulshani Farm in Andijan Region	
26 August 2008	Isaxan Baxromov	Head of the Saidnosirxon Farm in Surxondaryo Region	
26 August 2008	Egambergan Karimov	Director of the Urgench Automobile and Road Professional College	
26 August 2008	Farxat Soyibov	Head of the Shop of Hydrometallurgical Plant No. 2 at the Navoiy Mining and Metallurgical Plant	
26 August 2008	Gayratdin Xojaniyazov	Head of the Department of Archeology of the Institute of History, Archeology and Ethnography of the Karakalpak branch of the Academy of Sciences of Uzbekistan	
25 August 2009	Komil Ibrogimov	Shift manager at the Navoiy Thermal Power Plant	
25 August 2009	Toʻra Narziyev	Excavator operator at Amu-Buxorokanalqurilish JSC	
25 August 2009	Alim Toʻychiyev	Smelter at the Uzbekistan Metallurgy Plant in Tashkent	
24 August 2010	Yusup Ziyayev	Machinist at Uzbekistan Railways	
24 August 2010	Kamoliddin Gʻopirov	Director of Boarding School No. 53 in Andijan Region	
24 August 2010	Patila Ergasheva	Head of the Patilaxon Farm in Fergana Region	
23 August 2011	Sarsenbay Seytnazarov	Head of the Tayimbet Farm in Karakalpakstan	
23 August 2011	Aleksandr Farmanov	Chairman of the Board of the Olmaliq Mining and Metallurgical Plant	
23 August 2011	Hasanboy Qosimov	Chief technologist of the Production Technology Department of GM Uzbekistan	
23 August 2012	Sodiqjon Turdiyev	Head of the Asaka Jilosi Farm in Andijon Region	
23 August 2012	Xolidjon Komilov	Professor of the Department of Ophthalmology at the Tashkent Institute of Advanced Medical Studies	
23 August 2012	Mirzahmat Shaimov	Chief engineer of the Syrdarya Power Plant	
22 August 2013	Turgun Azlarov	Mathematics and computer science teacher at Secondary Comprehensive School No. 40 in Tashkent	
22 August 2013	Ochilboy Ramatov	Chairman of the Board of Uzbekistan Railways	
22 August 2013	Anorboy Eshmatov	Head of the Anvar Farm in Jizzakh region	
22 August 2014	Abdimurat Bazarov	Head of the Bozor oʻgʻli Abdi Farm in Qashqadaryo Region	
22 August 2014	Shukurjon Mamatqulov	Director of the Oltinkoʻl Economic College	
22 August 2014	Zayniddin Nizomxoʻjayev	Department Head in the Vosit Vohidov Republican Specialized Center of Surgery	
25 August 2015	Suyima Gʻaniyeva	Professor at the Tashkent State University of Oriental Studies	
25 August 2015	Quvondiq Sanaqulov	General Director of the Navoiy Mining and Metallurgical Plant	
25 August 2015	Tavakkal Topvoldiyev	Chairman of the Andijan regional department of the Nuroniy Foundation	
25 August 2015	Avaz Hosilov	Head of the Hosil Farm in Samarkand Region	
23 August 2016	Ravshanbek Qurbonov	Director of the Republican Specialized Center of Cardiology	
23 August 2016	Sharipboy Rajabov	Head of the Bogot Farm in Khorezm Region	
23 August 2016	Erkin Ummatov	Deputy Head of the Capital Construction Directorate of Uzbekistan Railways	
23 August 2016	Muhabbat Sharapova	Mathematics teacher at Specialized Boarding School No. 2 in Karshi, Qashqadaryo Region	
28 August 2019	Musa Yerniyazov	Chairman of the Supreme Council of Karakalpakstan	
28 August 2019	Lola Murotova	Head of the Nurli Obod Farm in Fergana Region	
28 August 2019	Hasan Normurodov	Chairman of the Samarkand regional department of the Nuroniy Foundation	
24 August 2021	Muhammad Ahmedov	Head of the Madaniyat Muhammad Ismat Farm in Bukhara Region	
24 August 2021	Shavkat Ayupov	Director of the Institute of Mathematics of the Academy of Sciences of Uzbekistan	
24 August 2021	Ibrohim Gʻafurov	Literary scholar	
24 August 2021	Munojot Yoʻlchiyeva	Head of the Department of Traditional Performance of the State Conservatory of Uzbekistan	
