= Svetlana Ortiqova =

Uzbek lawyer and politician

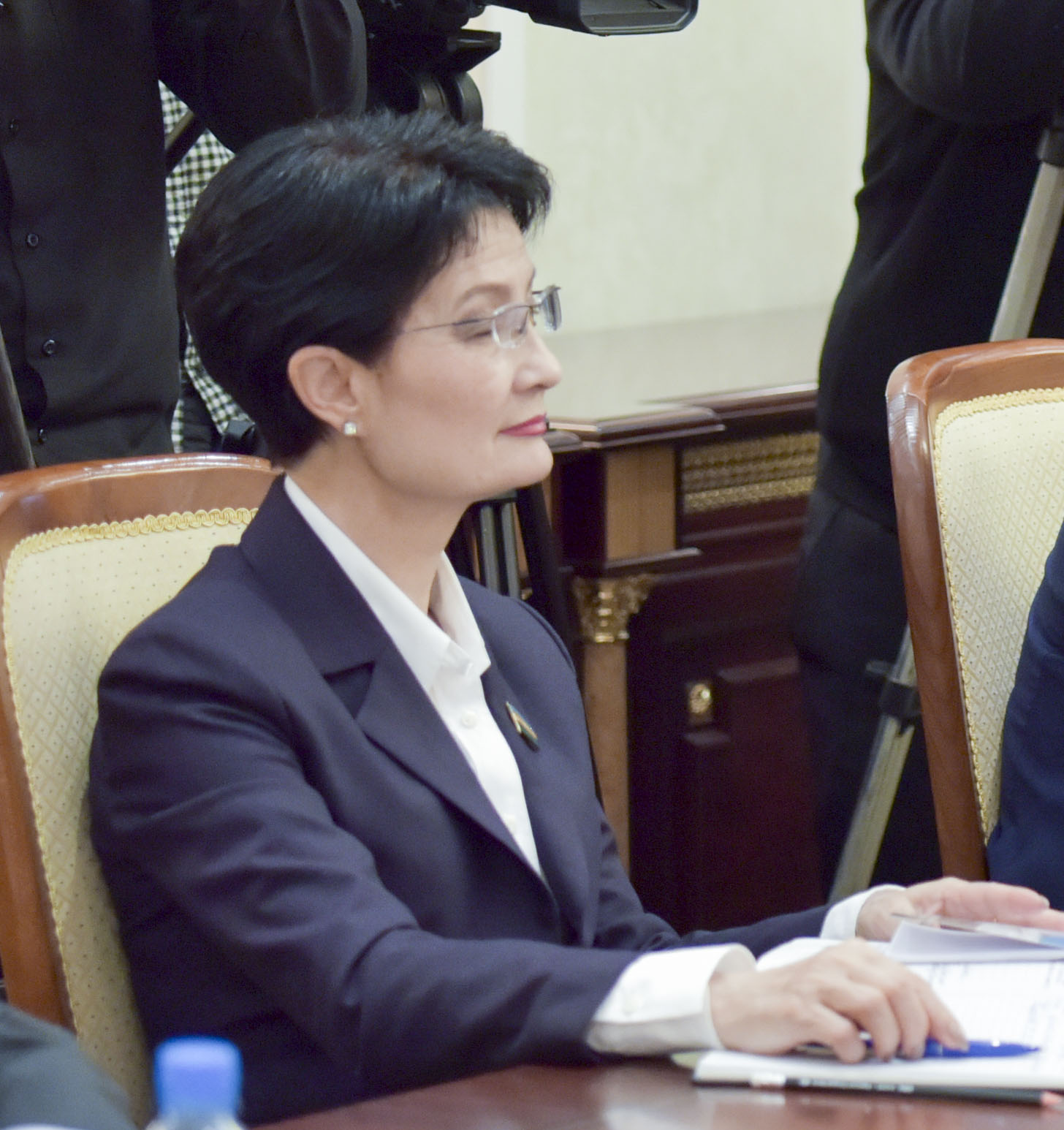
- Born: Ortiqova Svetlana Boymirzayevna; January 1, 1962 (age 64); Uchkurgan District, Namangan Region, Uzbek SSR, USSR
- Occupation: politician
- Awards: Order of "Mekhnat Shukhrati" (2006)

Svetlana Baymirzaevna Artikova( was born on January 1, 1962, in Uchkurgan District, Namangan Region) is a lawyer, public and political figure, senator (2010, 2015), and Deputy Chairman of the Senate. Since November 7, 2019, she has been appointed Deputy Prosecutor General of the Republic of Uzbekistan.

== Biography ==
Svetlana Artykova was born on January 1, 1962, in the Uchkurgan District of Namangan Region. In 1987 she graduated from the law faculty of Tashkent State University. At various times, she worked as an inspector at the Uchkurgan Interdistrict Prosecutor's Office in the Namangan Region (1980–1988); senior assistant prosecutor of the city of Namangan (1988–1990); prosecutor for general oversight at the General Prosecutor's Office of Uzbekistan (1993–1996); senior prosecutor of the Department of Coordination of Laws and Legal Propaganda at the General Prosecutor's Office of Uzbekistan (1998–1999), and head of the Department of Legal Propaganda of Legislation at the General Prosecutor's Office of Uzbekistan.

On January 22, 2010, by the decree of the President of Uzbekistan, Svetlana Artykova was appointed a member of the Senate of the Oliy Majlis of the second conference and became the head of the Senate Committee on Legislation and Judicial-Legal Issues. Since 2014, she held the position of Deputy Chairman of the Central Election Commission of Uzbekistan.

On January 20, 2015, by the decree of the President of Uzbekistan, Svetlana Artykova was once again appointed as a senator. On January 22, 2015, she was elected by secret ballot to the position of Deputy Chairman of the Senate. Since 2019 – Deputy Prosecutor General of the Republic of Uzbekistan.

== See also ==
- Svetlana Gerasimova
- Agitay Adilov
- Nikolay Kucherskiy
- Aysanem Alliyarova
- Elmira Bosithonova
- Hasan Normurodov

== Awards ==
"Mehnat shuhrati ordeni" (Order of "Mekhnat Shukhrati") (2006)
