= Agitay Adilov =

Uzbek politician

Personal details
- Born: January 10, 1941 Taxtakópir District, Karakalpak ASSR, Uzbek SSR, USSR
- Died: August 12, 2012 (aged 71) Taxtakópir District, Karakalpakstan, Uzbekistan

Agʻitay Adilov (January 10, 1941 – August 14, 2012) was an honored agricultural worker of Uzbekistan (1992), a senator (2005), and a Hero of Uzbekistan (2005).

== Biography ==
Agitai Adilov was born in 1941 in the Takhtakupyr District of the Karakalpak ASSR. He worked as an accountant at the Davkara collective farm in the Takhtakupyr District and later as the chief accountant of the " Qo‘ng‘irotko‘l " collective farm. He went on to become the director of the Taxtako‘pir collective farm, which later became a state-owned enterprise known as " Taxtako‘pir ". In 2007, he was appointed as the chairman of the alternative MTP "Adilet-Takhta".

Through his work, Adilov made contribution to the development of agriculture and the farmer's movement in the challenging natural and climatic conditions of Karakalpakstan.

In 2005, Adilov was elected as a senator representing the Republic of Karakalpakstan. In recognition of his many years of service to the country, Adilov was awarded the "Shukhrat" medal in 1998, the "El-Yurt Khurmati" Order in 2003, and in 2005, he was bestowed with the title of Hero of Uzbekistan. Adilov died on August 14, 2012.

== Awards ==
- "Hero of Uzbekistan" (2005)
- "El-yurt hurmati" ordeni (Order of "El-Yurt Khurmati") (2003)
- "Shuhrat" medali (Medal "Shukhrat") (1998)
- "O‘zbekistonda xizmat ko‘rsatgan qishloq xo‘jaligi xodimi" (Honored "Agricultural Worker of Uzbekistan") (1992)
- "Qoraqalpogʻiston QASSRda xizmat koʻrsatgan iqtisodchi"(Honored "Economist of the Karakalpak ASSR") (1976)

== See also ==
- Svetlana Ortiqova
- Nikolay Kucherskiy
- Aysanem Alliyarova
- Elmira Bosithonova
- Hasan Normurodov
