= Bulakbashi =

Bulakbashi, or Buloqboshi, may refer to:

- Bulakbashi, Kyrgyzstan
- Bulakbashy, Uzbekistan, a town in the Andijan region of Uzbekistan
- Buloqboshi District, a raion in Uzbekistan
