= Svetlana Gerasimova =

Uzbek Soviet teacher

- Svetlana Ivanovna Gerasimova
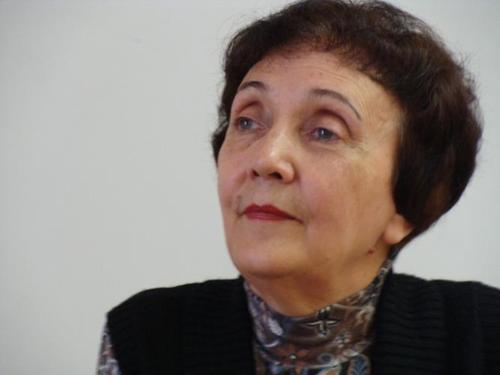

Personal details
- Born: 2 February 1951 (age 75) Tashkent, Uzbek SSR, USSR
- Awards: Pushkin Medal (February 28, 2008, Russia); "Oʻzbekiston xalq oʻqituvchisi" (People's teacher of Uzbekistan); Gratitude from the mayor of Moscow (October 19, 2007)

Svetlana Ivanovna Gerasimova (Russian: Светлана Ивановна Герасимова; born 2 February 1951, in Tashkent, USSR) is the Director of Secondary School No. 50 in Tashkent. She is an Honored Educator of the Republic of Uzbekistan, a People's Teacher of Uzbekistan (2000), and the former chairperson of the Russian Cultural Center of the Republic of Uzbekistan (2003–2009). She also served as a senator from 2005 to 2010.

== Biography ==
Svetlana Gerasimova was born in Tashkent on February 2, 1951. She graduated from the Philology Department of Tashkent State University, specializing in Russian literature. She worked as a teacher of Russian literature and taught Russian language and literature in schools in the Mirzo-Ulugbek district of Tashkent.

=== Teaching career ===
Svetlana Gerasimova served as the head of the educational department and, from 1988 to 2010, as the director of Secondary School No. 50. She is the author of the "Concept of Aesthetic Education," based on the idea of students' creative freedom. Since 2003, she has led the humanitarian and educational organization "Russian Cultural Center of the Republic of Uzbekistan". The center consistently develops programs for the study of Russian culture in Uzbekistan. It collaborates with state and international public organizations to organize festivals, concerts, and events dedicated to prominent figures in Russian culture, as well as seminars and conferences. The center also provides social support and works towards the preservation and development of the Russian language, culture, spirituality, and the study of Russian history.

=== Political career ===
In 2004, the city Kengash of People's Deputies elected Svetlana Ivanovna Gerasimova as a senator to the Oliy Majlis of Uzbekistan. She served as a member of the Senate Committee on Foreign Affairs.

== Awards ==
- Pushkin Medal (February 28, 2008, Russia) - for her contribution to the promotion and study of the Russian language, preservation of cultural heritage, rapprochement, and mutual enrichment of the cultures of nations and peoples.
- People's teacher of Uzbekistan (September 29, 2000) - for her contribution to the development of the public education system, the implementation of the national personnel training program, the training and education of young people at the level of modern requirements, and the formation of high personnel potential.
- Gratitude from the mayor of Moscow (October 19, 2007) - for her contribution to the development of relations with the historical homeland, and promotion of Russian cultural and spiritual values.

== See also ==
- Svetlana Ortiqova
- Agitay Adilov
- Aysanem Alliyarova
- Hasan Normurodov
