= Abdumoʻmin Oʻtbosarov =

Uzbek TV announcer (1960–2016)

Abdumo‘min O‘tbosarov
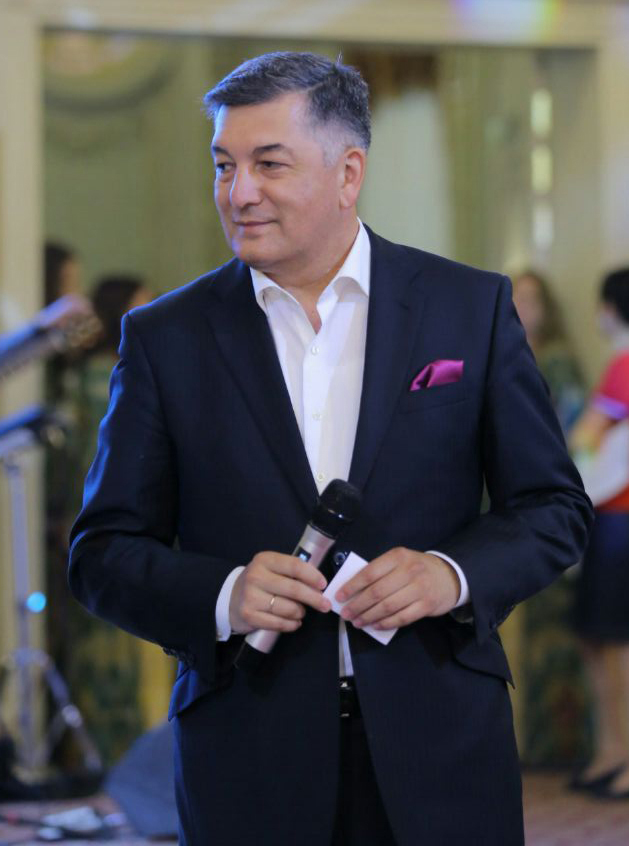
- Born: Abdumo‘min Abdumajidovich O‘tbosarov; April 24, 1960; Tashkent, Uzbek SSR, Soviet Union
- Died: January 1, 2016 (aged 55); Tashkent, Uzbekistan
- Writing career
- Notable awards

Abdumo‘min Abdumajidovich O‘tbosarov (April 24, 1960 — January 1, 2016, Tashkent, Uzbekistan) was an announcer of the National Television and Radio Company of Uzbekistan, People's Artist of Uzbekistan (2014).

== Biography ==
Abdumo‘min O‘tbosarov was born on April 24, 1960, in the city of Tashkent. His father was a teacher, and his mother was a medical worker. He was the second of four children. His father loved to take pictures, so he encouraged his son to do the same.

He graduated from school and served in the ranks of the Soviet Army in the Khabarovsk Krai from 1977 to 1979. When they found out that the future announcer had knowledge of photography, they invited him to work as a photojournalist.

After returning from military service, he handed over his documents to the faculty of journalism of the Tashkent State University in the evening department (now the National University of Uzbekistan) and together with the documents, he added excerpts from military newspapers where his articles and essays were published. These articles served to get him into the university without entrance exams.

In 1981, O‘tbosarov was hired as an assistant director at Television. In 1986, O‘tbosarov was transferred to the Announcers group as an announcer. From 1988 to 1989, he was sent to Moscow to the All-Union Institute of Professional Development of Television and Radio Broadcasting Staff. His teacher was Igor Kirillov, the chief announcer of Central Television. Abdumo‘min O‘tbosarov was an announcer of TV programs at Ostankino. After returning from Moscow, he continued his work as a presenter on Uzbek television.

Adumomin Abdumajidovich worked as an announcer throughout his career. He conducted the information program "Akhborot", participated in the opening of many sports events such as "Umid Nihollari", "Barkamol Avlod". He hosted the following state events: SCO International summit; "Sharq Taronalari" international music festival; held concerts and festive events dedicated to the visits of foreign heads of state.

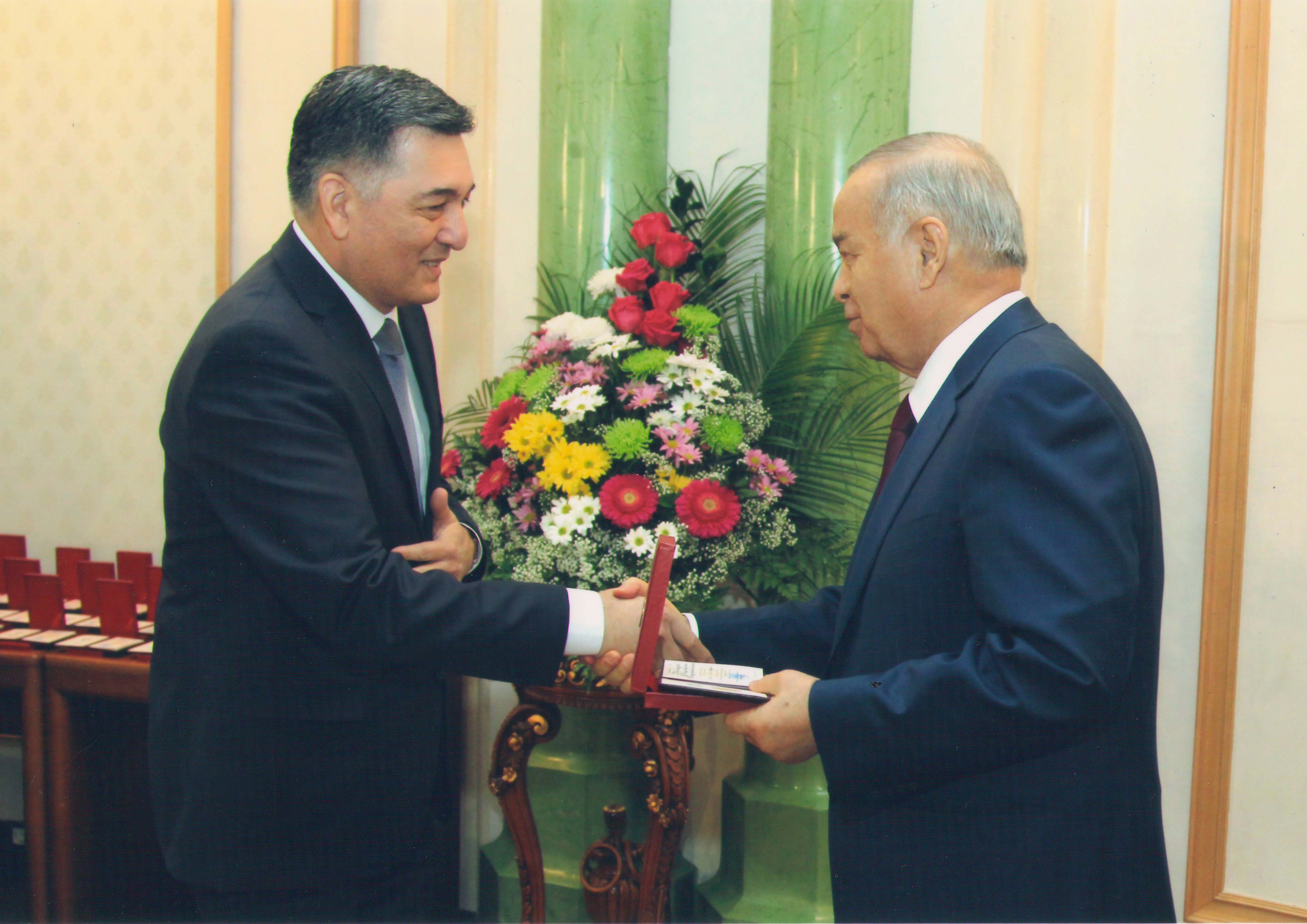
Presentation of the title "People's Artist of the Republic of Uzbekistan".

He is the author of several collections of satirical poems "Topgan Gul...".

Suhandan's last performance was on December 31, 2015, when the President of Uzbekistan, Islam Karimov, gave a New Year's greeting. After the program, he had a heart attack and died in the intensive care unit of the Tashkent Medical Academy.

== Family ==
He is married to Gozal O‘tbosarova and they have two sons.

== Awards ==
- Oʻzbekistonda xizmat koʻrsatgan madaniyat xodimi (Honored Culture Worker of Uzbekistan)
- Oʻzbekiston xalq artisti (People's Artist of Uzbekistan)
- "Mehnat shuhrati" ordeni (Order of Labor Glory)
