= Mohabbat =

Mohabbat, Mohabat, or Muhabbat may refer to:

== Given name ==
=== Mohabat ===
- Mohabat Khan Marri, Pakistani politician
- Mohabat Momand (born 1995), Afghan cricketer

=== Mohabbat ===
- Mohabbat Jan Chowdhury (1933/34–2026), Bangladeshi Army general and politician

=== Muhabbat ===
- Muhabbat Sharapova (born 1949), Uzbek mathematician

== Films ==
- Mohabbat (1972 film), a Pakistani Urdu film
- Mohabbat (1985 film), a Bollywood film by Bapu
- Mohabbat (1997 film), a Bollywood film starring Sanjay Kapoor, Madhuri Dixit and Akshay Khanna
- Mohabbath (2011 film), a Malayalam film starring Meera Jasmine, Anand Michael and Munna

== Other ==
- Malayalam-language title of Yehh Jadu Hai Jinn Ka!, an Indian fantasy television series
- "Filhaal 2: Mohabbat", a 2021 Indian song by Jaani and B Praak, follow-up to the 2019 song "Filhall"
- "Mohabbat" (song), ghazal written by Hafeez Hoshiarpuri

== See also ==
- Mohabbatein, a 2000 Indian romantic film by Aditya Chopra, starring Shah Rukh Khan, Amitabh Bachchan and Aishwarya Rai
