= Girey Bairov =

Crimean Tatar pediatric surgeon (1922–1999)

- Born: 2 May 1922; Alushta, Crimean ASSR, RSFSR, USSR
- Died: 6 July 1999 (aged 77); Saint Petersburg, Russian Federation
- Education: First Moscow State Medical University; Saratov State Medical University
- Awards: USSR State Prize (1979)

Girey Alievich Bairov (Russian: Гирей Алиевич Баиров; 2 May 1922 – 6 July 1999) was a Crimean Tatar pediatric surgeon in the Soviet Union; he was one of the founders of pediatric surgery in Leningrad and later became head of the Department of Pediatric Surgery at the Leningrad/Saint Petersburg State Pediatric Medical University. In 1963 he became a corresponding member of the Soviet Academy of Medical Sciences.

== Early life ==
Bairov was born on 2 May 1922 in Alushta to a family of academics. His father, Ali Memetovich Beirov, was a schoolteacher, while both his maternal and paternal grandfathers were doctors. As a child he dreamed of becoming a pilot, and after graduating school in 1938 he passed the entrance exams to be accepted into the Moscow Aviation Institute, but changed his plans and chose to attend the First Moscow State Medical University instead. In autumn 1941, after the German invasion of the Soviet Union, the school was evacuated to Ufa, but Bairov moved to Saratov where he continued his studies at the military faculty of the Saratov Medical Institute. After graduating, he was deployed to the front lines as an army doctor in a motor-rifle battalion of the 135th Tank Brigade in February 1943. In July that year, he was seriously wounded during the crossing of the Seversky Donets river of the Izyum-Barvenkovo Offensive. During the battle, he provided first aid to an estimated 400 soldiers and officers, personally carrying 35 that were seriously wounded off the battlefield with their weapons. Despite sustaining wounds to the head, leg, and arm he continued to lead the group of medical instructors and orderlies in the heat of battle for over three hours. While being treated at the military field hospital in Kantemirovka, he met his future wife Vera Semyonovna, a surgeon at the hospital. It was there in Kantemirovka that Bairov participated in his first pediatric surgery, despite being on crutches at the time. Upon recovering from his injuries he returned to active duty and was posted as a surgeon to a military field hospital, where he remained until transferring to Leningrad in 1945.

== Surgical career ==
Initially, Bairov worked at the Rauhfusa Hospital after the war, where he was noticed in 1949 by the head of the Department of Pediatric Surgery, professor Aleksandr Shatsky, who offered him the position of laboratory assistant in his department. From then on, his career was tied to the Leningrad Pediatric Institute, and in 1954 he defended his doctoral thesis. In 1955, just a few months after Aleksandr Tur declared esophageal atresia untreatable, Bairov successfully operated on an infant with the condition, resulting in widespread praise and publicity. That same year he became an associate professor in the department, and in 1960 he defended his doctoral dissertation on the topic "Fractures in the elbow joint in children". Later when he a professor Bairov would joke that he fought his way into science with his elbows. After becoming the Head of the Department of Pediatric Surgery in Leningrad, (succeeding Stanislav Doletsky), Bairov took on the responsibility of organizing a unified pediatric surgery service throughout Leningrad. In the early 1960s, pediatric surgery in the city was relatively disorganized, scattered throughout three hospitals plus a clinic but with little coordination between them. Under Bairov, the number of pediatric surgery hospitals in the city doubled, and specialized departments were formed for various needs, such as emergency surgery, planned surgery, neonatal surgery, traumatology, and urology. During his tenure, Children's Hospital No.1 was built, and a specialized department for treating newborns with birth defects was located there. Two years after the department was formed, Bairov was awarded the USSR State Prize in 1979 for improvements in surgery methods for treating children with congenital abnormalities. Later he assisted one of his students, Eduard Tsybulkin, in establishing the department of emergency pediatrics. For a large portion of his career, Bairov headed the pediatric surgery department at the Surgical Society named after Pirogov, where he trained many future pediatric surgeons. Even after formally retiring in 1992, he continued to consult in pediatric surgical treatment at the department in Saint Petersburg until his death on 6 July 1999. ]

== See also ==
- Fozil Amirov
