= Naima Mahmudova =

Soviet Uzbek doctor and stateswoman

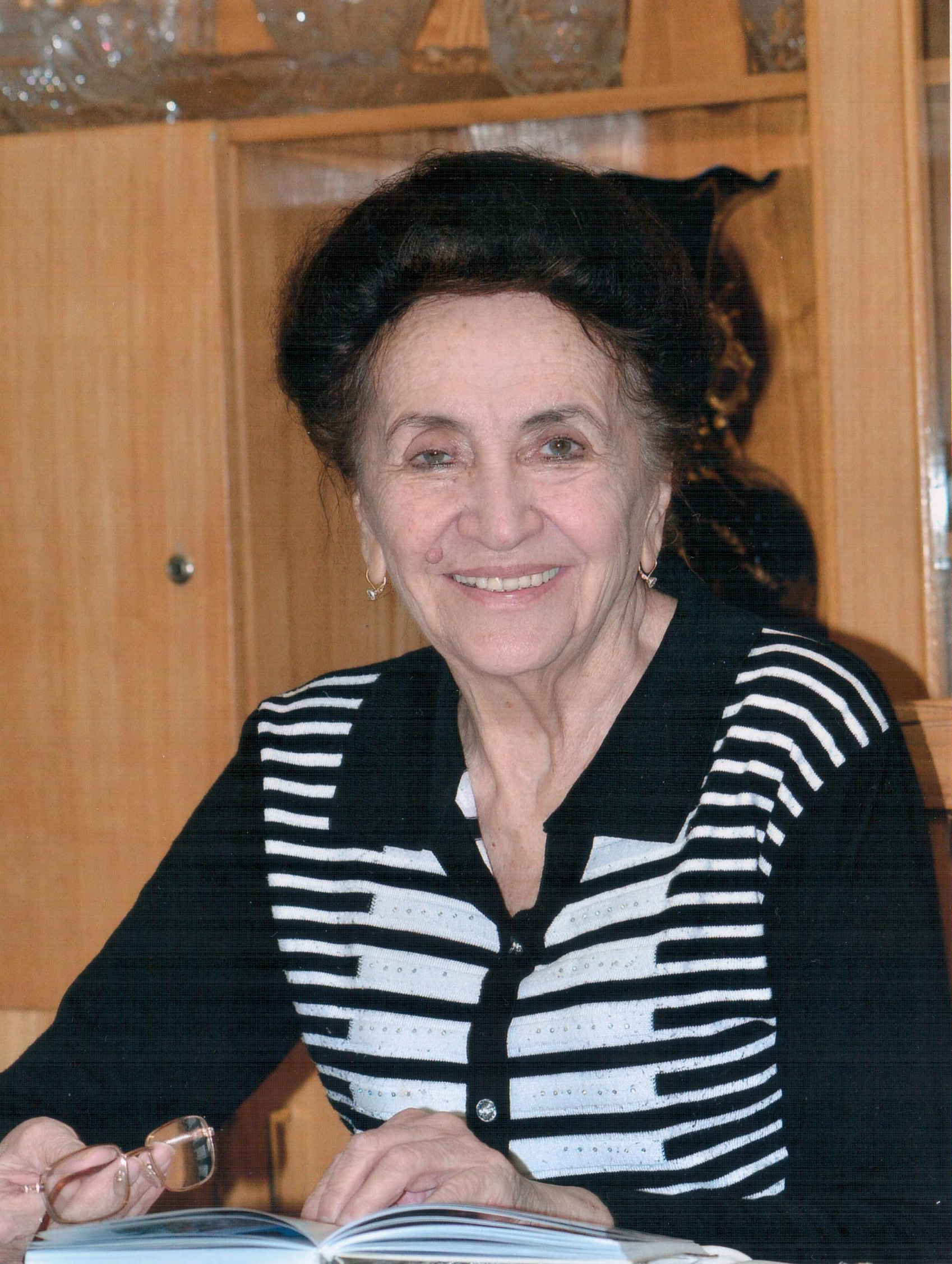
- Born: August 10, 1928; Tashkent, Uzbek SSR, Soviet Union
- Died: June 7, 2017; Tashkent, Uzbekistan
- Other names: Наима Махмудовна Махмудова

Naima Makhmudovna Makhmudova (Uzbek: Naima Maxmudovna Maxmudova/Наима Махмудовна Махмудова; 10 August 1928 – 7 June 2017) was a Soviet Uzbek doctor and academic associated with what became Tashkent Medical Academy.

== Life ==
Mahmudova was born in Tashkent. Her father was a poet and educator. Her father, Mahmud Khodiyev - Botu, was employed in the Department of Education and when he was 26, he was arrested with others as an "enemy of the people". He died on 9 May 1938 but his body was never returned. Her mother was sentenced to ten years in prison leaving the two year old Mahmudova to be brought up by her grandparents, Tokhkhan and Maqsud.

She went to the Orga State University but left to attend Taskent's State Medical Institute. In 1951 she graduated and a job in research was available but it was denied to her because of her father's reputation.

In 1958 she was working in public health at the regional sanitary and epidemiological station in Urgut and she left there to work again as a chief physician at the Samakand regional sanitary and epidemiological station. She was there until 1963 when she was promoted to be Uzbek SSR's Deputy Minister of Health. During her time as deputy minister her dissertation for her doctorate on the Historical development of therapy in Uzbekistan was accepted.

She became a Professor when she was employed by the Tashkent Pediatric Medical Institute in 1986 to lead what became their General and Social Hygiene and Healthcare faculty. She stayed there for fourteen years and even then she remained a consulting professor.

Mahmudova died in Tashkent.

== Private life ==
She married Umar Kurbanov who was the chief physician at Urgut district hospital.
