= Munojot Yoʻlchiyeva =

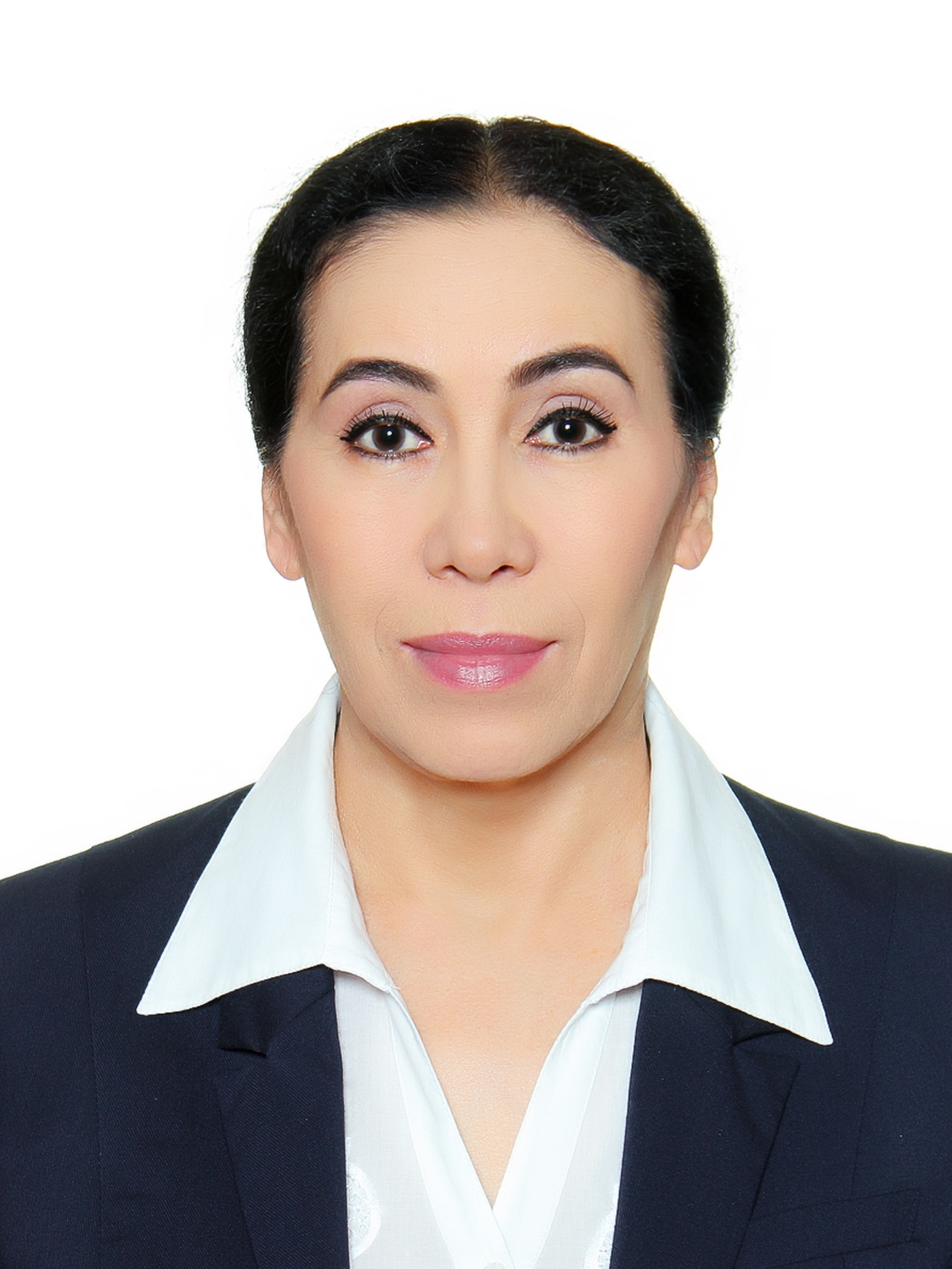

Background information
- Born: 26 November 1960 (age 65); Buloqboshi district, Andijan region
- Genres: Shashmaqam
- Occupation: Singer
- Years active: 1978–present

Munojot Yoʻlchiyeva (born 1960), also known under the Russian form of her name, Munadjat Yulchieva, a performer of classical Uzbek music and its Persian-language cousin Shashmaqâm. She is famous for the unique quality of her voice and her natural charisma. She is recognized as People's Artist of Uzbekistan (1994). She is honored as the Heroine of Uzbekistan (2021).

== Professional career ==
Yoʻlchiyeva was born in 1960 in the Buloqboshi district of Andijan region in the Ferghana Valley, near Tashkent. From an early age, it was evident that she had a great gift as a singer. This nearly led her into a career as an opera singer, but she was inexorably drawn to the slow, aching music of her own ancient culture – something that seemed almost pre‑ordained by her name, which means 'ascent to God' or simply 'prayer'.

She is accompanied by her mentor, the rubab player Shawqat Mirzaev. Her repertoire includes his compositions, and she performs with his ensemble. The group typically uses local instruments such as the dutar (a two‑stringed lute), the tanbur (a three‑stringed lute), a gidjak spike fiddle, a doira frame drum, a ney flute, and, at times, the chang zither. Those fortunate enough to attend one of her concerts abroad will see a performer of startling gravitas and charisma, dressed in traditional style, with long pigtails trailing down to her waist.

In 1997, she won the International Music Festival Sharq Taronalari. In 2005, she performed at the Austrian Music Festival Glatt und Verkehrt.

Only two recordings of her music are widely available: the first, for the French label Ocora (1994), and the most recent, on Germany's Network label (1997), which has the subtitle A Haunting Voice.

== Medals ==
- "Oʻzbekiston SSRda xizmat koʻrsatgan artist" (Honoured Artist of the Uzbekistan SSR) (3 May 1990) – for contributions to music, theatre, national choreography, and songwriting, as well as for preparing and conducting the Navruz holiday and telegrams.
- "People's Artist of Uzbekistan" (10 June 1994) – for contributions to the development of the national theatre and participation in public life.
- Winner of the Sharq Taronalari Festival (1997)
- "El‑yurt xurmati" (Order of "Respect of the Country") (27 August 1998) – for contributions to education, culture, healthcare, and sports, and for strengthening the independence of our country.
- "Fidokorona xizmatlari uchun" (Order for "Selfless Services") (23 August 2004) – for contributions to the development of national culture, science, education, literature, art, and healthcare.
- "Order of Outstanding Merit" (24 August 2011) – for strengthening the independence of the homeland, the development of national identity, the promotion of culture, and participation in public life.
- "Mehnat shuhrati" (Order of Labour Glory) (29 August 2019) – for contributions to the intellectual development, physical education, and sports of the people, and for contributions to the enhancement of socio‑political culture.
- "Oʻzbekiston Qahramoni" (Hero of Uzbekistan) (24 August 2021) – for contributions to the reforms carried out in New Uzbekistan in recent years, dedication to the welfare of the state and its people, work in production and socio‑cultural fields, the role played in nurturing our youth with values, respect for national and universal values, and participation in the social life of the country.
