= Ibrohim Gʻafurov =

Uzbek writer and politician (1937–2026)

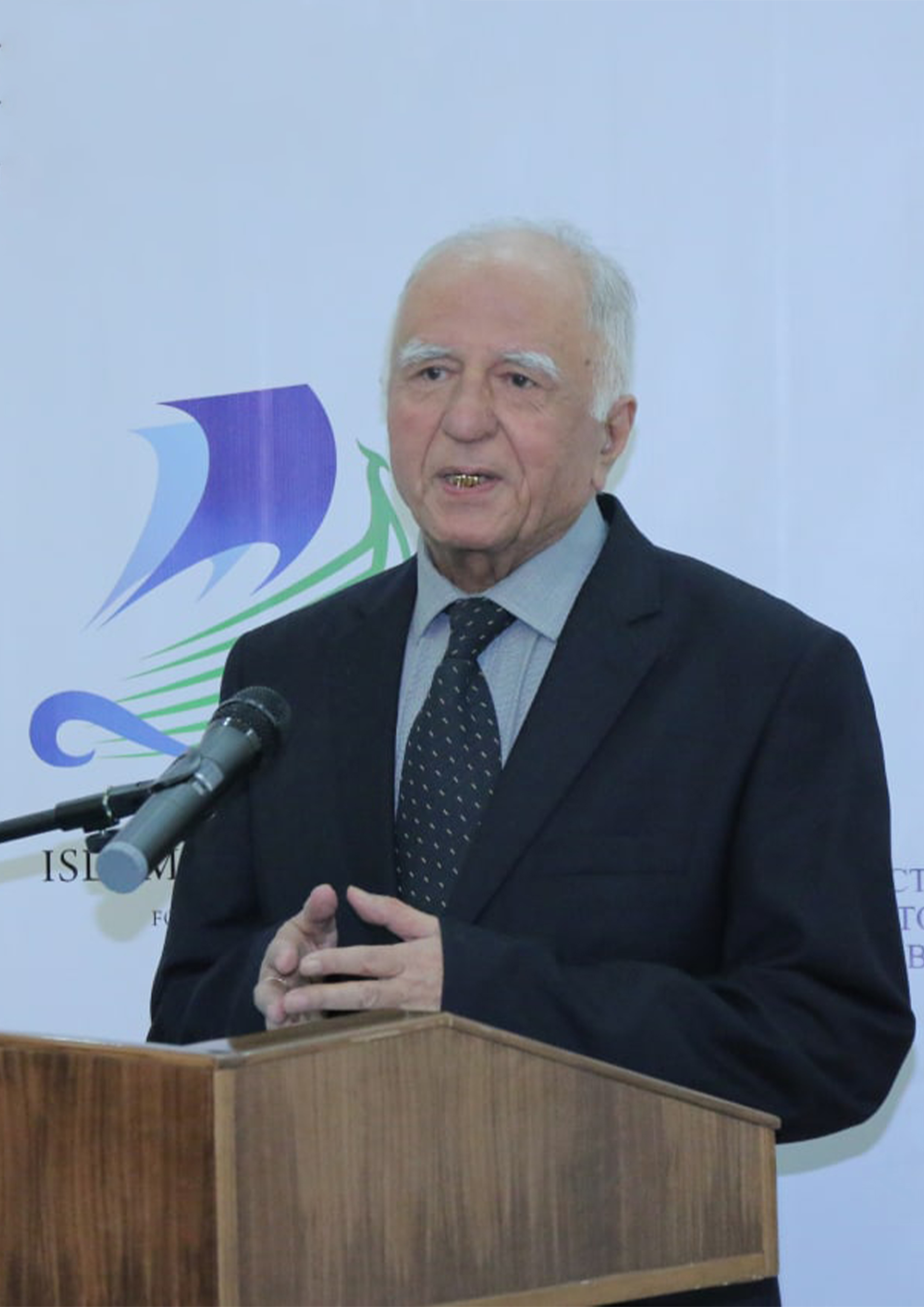
- Gʻafurov in 2024

Member of the Oliy Majlis
- In office 27 December 1999 – 26 December 2004

Personal details
- Born: 27 December 1937 Tashkent, Uzbek SSR, Soviet Union
- Died: 6 June 2026 (aged 88)
- Profession: Politician; translator; writer
- Awards: Hero of Uzbekistan

Ibrohim Usmonovich Gʻafurov (27 December 1937 – 6 June 2026) was an Uzbek writer, translator, literary critic, and politician who was a member of the Oliy Majlis from 1999 to 2004.

Throughout his career, Gʻafurov translated the works of many different writers, including Chinghiz Aitmatov, Fyodor Dostoevsky, Ernest Hemingway, and Guy de Maupassant into the Uzbek language. He also wrote many original works including Til erkinligi, Unitilmagan bog‘, and Yonar so‘z.

For his accomplishments Gʻafurov received many awards including the title Hero of Uzbekistan on 24 August 2021, the State Hamza Prize in 1989, and the Order of Friendship in 1995.

== Life and work ==
Gʻafurov was born in Tashkent on 27 December 1937.

His first article was published in O‘zbekistan Madaniyati in 1959. Afterwards his works were regularly published in major magazines. In 1961, he graduated from the philological faculty of Tashkent State University, after which he formally began his career.

Gʻafurov worked at the Gʻafur Gʻulom Publishing House, and from 1970 to 1982 he was deputy editor-in-chief of it; in 1971 he became a member of the Communist Party of the Soviet Union. From 1982 to 1995, he was the deputy editor-in-chief of the newspaper Oʻzbekiston Adabiyoti va Sanʼati.

After Uzbekistan gained independence, he was a deputy in the Oliy Majlis, and served as First Deputy Chairman of the Milliy Tiklanish Democratic Party starting in 1995.

His wife Oydin Hojiyeva was also a writer and specialized in poetry. Gʻafurov died on 6 June 2026 aged 88.
