= Uchkurgan =

Uchkurgan may refer to:

- Uchqoʻrgʻon, city in Uzbekistan
- Üch-Korgon, village in Kyrgyzstan
