= Andijon, Buloqboshi =

Andijon
- urban-type settlement
- Location in Uzbekistan
- Coordinates: 40°38′40″N 72°21′50″E
- Country: Uzbekistan
- Region: Andijan Region
- District: Buloqboshi District
- urban-type settlement status: 1942

Population (2016)
  - Total: 12,200
- Time zone: UTC+5 (UZT)

Andijon (Uzbek: Андижон, Andijon, Russian: Андижан, romanized: Andizhan) is an urban-type settlement of Buloqboshi District in Andijan Region, Uzbekistan. The town population in 1989 was 4,549 people, and 12,200 in 2016.
