= Siyosatxon Abdullayeva =

Uzbek farmer and peasant (1940–2018)

- Born: November 5, 1940; Oltinkoʻl District, Andijon Region, Uzbek SSR, Soviet Union
- Died: July 27, 2018 (aged 77); Oltinkoʻl District, Andijon Region, Uzbekistan
- Occupations: Politician, farmer, entrepreneur
- Years active: 1959–2018
- Known for: Being a leader of the agricultural sector and a founder of the Andijon Cotton Academy

Siyosatxon Abdullayeva (November 5, 1940, in Oltinkoʻl District, Andijon Region — July 27, 2018) was an Uzbek farmer and peasant and a well-known representative and leader of the agricultural sector. She graduated from the Andijon Cotton Institute, which operated in the former Uzbek SSR.

== Biography ==
Siyosat Abdullayeva was born on November 5, 1940, in Oltinkoʻl District, Andijon Region. After completing her primary education, she enrolled in the Andijon Cotton Institute and graduated 1959. She began her work as a simple worker at the “Namuna” agricultural cooperative in her native district.

From 1972 to 1978, she worked as a teacher at the kindergarten associated with the “Namuna” cooperative in Oltinkoʻl District. After two years of work (1976-1978), she worked as a manager of the “Namuna” cooperative in Oltinkoʻl District from 1978 to 2006. From 2006 until her death, she led the “Oltinkoʻl Valley Flower Garden” farm in Oltinkoʻl District.

She was awarded the Friendship Order in 2005 and the Hero of Uzbekistan title in 2008 by president Islam Karimov. Abdullayeva is regarded as the founder of the Andijon Cotton Academy.

She died on July 27, 2018, at the age of 78, in Oltinkoʻl District, Andijon Region.
