= Botir Temirov =

Uzbek engineer

Botir Daminovich Temirov
- Born: September 5, 1948 (age 77); Fergana Region, Uzbek SSR, USSR
- Occupations: Engineer, mechanic
- Years active: 1966–present
- Known for: Launching the LCH-35 / 11-600 plant, producing high-octane gasoline

Botir Daminovich Temirov (born September 5, 1948, Fergana Region, Uzbek SSR, USSR) is an Uzbek engineer, mechanic of the technological workshop No. 1 of the Fergana Oil Refinery. He was awarded the title of Hero of Uzbekistan in 2005.

== Biography ==
He graduated from the Fergana Polytechnic Institute in 1989. He started his work in 1966 in the collective farm named after Khamid Olimjon in Kuvasay District. He was a duty plumber of the Fergana Oil Refinery from 1971 to 1975. He was a foreman of the workshop for collecting condensate and steam supply from 1975 to 1977. He was a locksmith of the 1st workshop of the LCH-35 / 11-600 plant from 1991 to 1994, and a senior machinist of the 1st technological workshop from 1994 to 1997. He has been an engineer of the 1st category of the OTK plant from 1997 to 1999, and a locksmith of the 1st technological workshop from 1999 to 2002. Temirov made a significant contribution to the launch of the LCH-35 / 11-600, which produces high-octane gasoline. Despite the fact that the equipment works flawlessly and at full capacity, he created a unique school of experience in extending the service life of equipment. Temirov Botir's rationalization proposal to create a site for repairing the fittings of high-pressure equipment requires a large amount of electricity.

In 2005, Temirov was awarded the title of Hero of UzbekistanHero of Uzbekistan. The award citation cited his contributions to the country's industrial production, social reforms, and his role in the education of younger generations.
