= Shavkat Ayupov =

Uzbek mathematician

- Born: September 14, 1952; Tashkent, Uzbek SSR, USSR
- Citizenship: Soviet Union → Uzbekistan
- Education: National University of Uzbekistan (1974)
- Awards: "Oʻzbekiston Qahramon"(Hero of Uzbekistan); "Mehnat shuhrati ordeni"(Order of Labor Fame); "Shuhrat" medali("Fame" medal); "Oʻzbekiston fan arbobi"(Scientist of Uzbekistan); Recipient of the State Prize of the 1st Degree in the field of science and technology (2017)
- Scientific career
- Fields: Functional analysis, Algebra and Topology
- Academic advisors: Toshmuhammad Sarimsoqov

Shavkat Abdullayevich Ayupov (Russian: Шавкат Абдуллаевич Аюпов; born September 14, 1952, in Tashkent) is a Soviet Uzbek scientist in the field of mathematics. He is an Academician of the Uzbekistan Academy of Sciences (1995). He is also a Senator in the Senate of the Oliy Majlis of the Republic of Uzbekistan (2020). He was awarded the title of Hero of Uzbekistan in 2021, and he holds the title of Distinguished Scientist of the Republic of Uzbekistan (2011). President of Academy of Sciences of Uzbekistan from December 16, 2024.

He was elected a Fellow of the World Academy of Sciences and the International Core Academy of Sciences and Humanities.

== Biography ==
He was born into an intellectual family. His father, Abdulla Talipovich Ayupov, was a participant in the Great Patriotic War and headed the Department of Philosophy at Tashkent University. His mother, Marguba Khamidova, was a doctor who worked as a therapist at the 4th City Clinical Hospital.

He graduated from Tashkent University in 1974 and was a student of Academician T.A. Sarymsakov. He earned a Candidate of Physical and Mathematical Sciences degree (1977) and a Doctor of Physical and Mathematical Sciences degree (1983).

He was a laureate of the Lenin Komsomol Prize as part of the authorial team consisting of Berdikulov, Musulmonkul Abdullaevich, Usmanov, Shukhrat Muttalibovich, and a research fellow at the Institute of Mathematics named after V.I. Romanovsky at the Academy of Sciences of the Uzbek SSR; Abdullaev, Rustambai Zairovich, an assistant at the Tashkent State Pedagogical Institute named after V.I. Lenin; Tikhonov, Oleg Yevgenyevich, an assistant, and Trunov, Nikolai Vasilievich, an associate professor at the V.I. Ulyanov Kazan State University, for their work on "Research on Operator Algebras and Non-Commutative Integration" (1989).

He became an Academician of the World Academy of Sciences in 2003. From 2008 to 2013, he was an associated member of the Abdus Salam International Centre for Theoretical Physics (ICTP) in Trieste, Italy. He became a member of the Senate of the Oliy Majlis of the Republic of Uzbekistan in 2020.

In 1992, he became the head of the Institute of Mathematics named after V.I. Romanovsky at the Academy of Sciences of the Republic of Uzbekistan.

In 1994, he embarked on a lengthy assignment at the University of Louis Pasteur in Strasbourg, France, where he conducted joint research with Professor J.-L. Lode. He teaches at the National University of Uzbekistan and is a professor of the Department of Algebra and Functional Analysis.

== Awards ==
- "Oʻzbekiston Qahramon" (Hero of Uzbekistan, August 24, 2021)
- "Mehnat shuhrati ordeni" (Order of "Mekhnat Shukhrati") (2003)
- "Shuhrat" medali (Medal "Shukhrat" 1996)
- "Oʻzbekiston fan arbobi" (Distinguished Scientist of the Republic of Uzbekistan, 2011)
- Recipient of the State Prize of the 1st Degree in the field of science and technology (2017)

== Literature ==
National Encyclopedia of Uzbekistan. The first volume. Tashkent, 2000
