= Toshmuhammad Sarimsoqov =

Uzbek mathematician

Toshmuhammad Sarimsoqov Тошмуҳаммад Саримсоқов
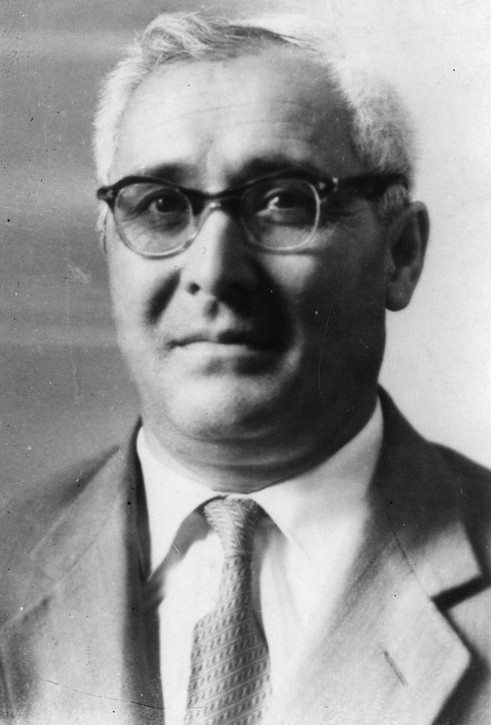
- Born: 10 September 1915; Shahrixon, Fergana Oblast, Russian Empire
- Died: 18 December 1995 (aged 80); Tashkent, Uzbekistan
- Citizenship: Soviet Union → Uzbekistan
- Education: Doctor of Physical and Mathematical Sciences
- Alma mater: Central Asian State University
- Awards: Hero of Socialist Labour
- Scientific career
- Academic advisors: Toshmuhammad Sarimsoqov
- Notable students: Shavkat Ayupov

Toshmuhammad Sarimsoqov (Uzbek Cyrillic: Тошмуҳаммад Алиевич Саримсоқов, Russian: Ташмухамед Алиевич Сарымсаков, Tashmukhamed Alievich Sarymsakov; 10 September 1915 – 17 December 1995) was an Uzbek mathematician who served as president of the Academy of Sciences of the Uzbek SSR from 1947 to 1952.

== Early life and education ==
Born on 10 September 1915 in Shahrixon to an Uzbek family, in 1931 he graduated from a Russian secondary school in Kokand; he subsequently enrolled in the Central Asia State University. There, he was one of the first students of Vsevolod Romanovsky. After graduating from the Faculty of Physics and Mathematics of the university in 1936, he remained at the university, where he attended graduate school. At the same time, he worked as assistant and associate professor. After briefly serving in the Red Army, he returned to the university in 1942 to defend his doctoral dissertation. That year he received his Doctor of Sciences degree.

He became a member of the Communist party in 1944 and served as a deputy in the third convocation of the Supreme Soviet of the Soviet Union.

== Career ==
In 1943 he became the rector of his university, and held that post until June 1944.

When the Academy of Sciences of the Uzbek SSR was founded in 1943, he became its vice president. In 1947 he became its president, and held the post until 1952. He then returned to being the rector of Central Asia State University, where he remained until 1958.

From 1959 to 1971 he served as the minister of higher education of the Uzbek SSR before again returning to being the rector of the university, which had been renamed to Tashkent State University in 1960. In 1983 he returned to working at the Academy of Sciences of the Uzbek SSR, and in 1988 he became advisor to the Presidium of the Academy of Sciences of the Uzbek SSR. His main areas of study were probability, statistics, and functional analysis. During his career he authored over 170 academic papers. His work on the theory of non-homogeneous Markov chains is cited in modern academic papers. For his work, he was awarded the title Hero of Socialist Labour on 3 April 1990. After Uzbekistan became independent he worked as an advisor to the President of the Academy of Sciences of Uzbekistan.

He died in Tashkent on 18 December 1995.

== Awards ==
- Hero of Socialist Labour (3 April 1990)
- Four Orders of Lenin (23 January 1946, 16 January 1950, 15 September 1961, 3 April 1990)
- Three Orders of the Red Banner of Labour (4 November 1944, 11 January 1957, 9 September 1971)
- Order of the Badge of Honour (1 March 1965)
- Order of the October Revolution (3 October 1975)
- Medal "For Labour Valour" (6 November 1951)
- Order of Outstanding Merit (23 August 2002)
- Stalin Prize (1948)
- Biruni State Prize (1967)
- Honoured Worker of Science and Technology of the Uzbek SSR (1960)
