= Fozil Amirov =

Uzbek Soviet scientist (1914–1979)

- Born: Fozil Fayzrahmonovich Amirov; January 16, 1914; Bukhara, Emirate of Bukhara, Russian Empire
- Died: July 7, 1979 (aged 65); Tashkent region, Uzbek SSR, USSR
- Citizenship: USSR
- Education: Tashkent Medical Academy
- Awards: Order of the Red Star; USSR State Prize; Patriotic War, 2nd class; "For Valiant Labor" medal; "For the Defense of Stalingrad" medal; "Honored Scientist of the Uzbek SSR"

Fozil Fayzrahmonovich Amirov (1914–1979) was an Uzbek Soviet scientist, medical doctor, surgeon, and an expert in topographical anatomy. He held the title of Doctor of Medical Sciences (1960) and Professor (1961). He was an Honored Scientist of the Uzbek SSR and a laureate of the State Prize of the USSR (1974).

== Biography ==
Amirov was born January 26, 1914, in Bukhara.

In 1938, he graduated from the Tashkent Medical Institute (now Tashkent Medical Academy). He participated in the Great Patriotic War. In 1943, he worked as the lead surgeon in an evacuation hospital and was awarded the "Order of the Red Star". From 1944 to 1946, in the position of the army's leading surgeon, he took part in the liberation of Hungary and Romania.

In 1945, he was awarded the Order of the "Patriotic War, 2nd class," as well as the medals "For the Defense of Stalingrad" and "For the Victory over Germany". "From 1947 to 1957, he worked as the deputy dean of the medical and dental faculties. In 1949, he obtained his Candidate of Sciences degree. His dissertation was on the topic "On the Pathogenesis of Open Pneumothorax and the Mechanism of Vagotomy in it". He received his Doctor of Sciences degree in 1959 with a dissertation titled "Plastic Repair of Tracheal and Bronchial Defects in Experiment".

In 1954, he was awarded the "For Labor Valor" medal. In 1970, he was awarded the "For Valiant Labor" medal. In 1971, he was given the title of "Honored Scientist of the Uzbek SSR". In 1974, he was awarded the "State Prize of the USSR" for the Development of Reconstructive Operations on the Trachea and Bronchi.

From 1966 to 1979, he was the head of the Department of Operative Surgery with Topographical Anatomy at Tashkent Medical Academy. He served as the chairman of the methodological section for optimizing the educational process at the institute and from 1959 to 1967, he was the vice-rector for research at Tashkent Medical Academy. He participated in international scientific conferences in London (1959), Rome (1960), and Berlin (1966).

Amirov died in Tashkent on July 7, 1979, and was buried at the "Minor" cemetery.

== Works ==
He authored 143 scientific works dedicated to various aspects of bronchology, issues related to anesthesia in plastic surgeries on the trachea and bronchi, and the development of reconstructive and restorative operations on the respiratory pathways. He developed methods for reconstructive operations on the respiratory pathways.

In 1962, Amirov published a monograph titled "Plastic Surgery of the Trachea and Bronchi," which significantly contributed to the widespread adoption of these surgical procedures in medical practice.

== Selected bibliography ==
- Angioplasty of the trachea and bronchi (experimental study), 1973
- X-ray anatomy of the abdomen and its organs, 1974
- One-lung ventilation under anesthesia, 1976
- Reconstructive operations on the trachea and bronchi, 1978
- Plastic surgery on the trachea and bronchi, 1962

== Awards ==
- Order of the Patriotic War, 2nd Class
- Order of the Red Star of the USSR
- Honored Scientist of the Uzbek SSR (1971)
- State Prize of the USSR (1974).
