= Vsevolod Romanovsky =

Russian mathematician

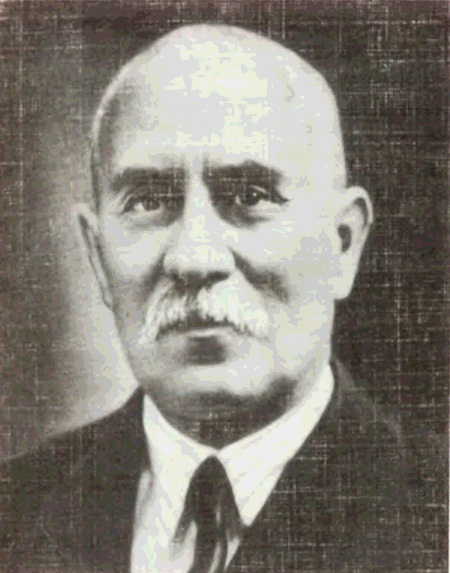
Academician V. I. Romanovsky

Vsevolod Ivanovich Romanovsky (Russian: Всеволод Иванович Романовский; 4 December 1879, Verny – 6 December 1954, Tashkent) was a Russian and Soviet mathematician working in Uzbek Soviet Socialist Republic, the founder of the Tashkent school of mathematics.

== Education and career ==
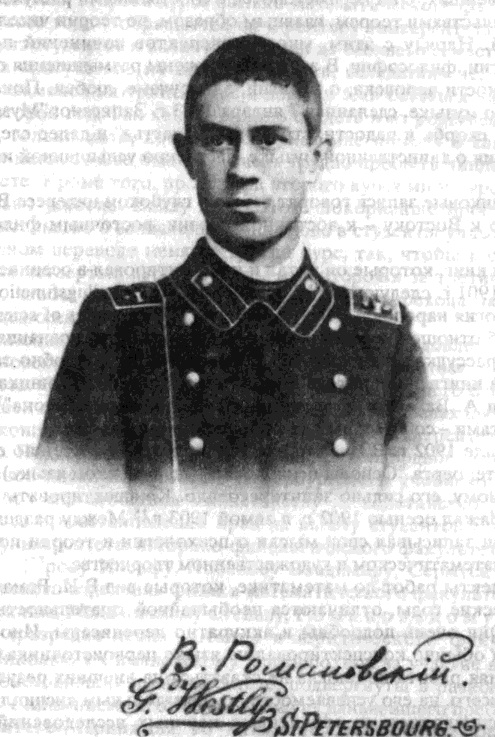
While studying at St. Petersburg University

In 1906 Romanovsky received, under the supervision of Andrey Markov, his doctoral degree from Saint Petersburg University. During 1900–1908 he was a student and then a docent at St. Petersburg University. In 1911–1915 he was a senior lecturer and then professor at the Imperial University of Warsaw, in 1915–1918 a professor at the Imperial University of Warsaw in Rostov-on-Don, and from 1918 a professor of probability and mathematical statistics at what is now called the National University of Uzbekistan (in Tashkent). His doctoral students include Toshmuhammad Sarimsoqov.

Romanovsky gained an international reputation for his work in mathematical statistics and probability theory. In 1943 he was made an Academician of the Uzbek Soviet Socialist Republic. The Uzbek Academy of Sciences' Romanovsky Institute of Mathematics is named in his honor. Romanovsky was an Invited Speaker at the ICM in 1928 in Bologna and in 1932 in Zürich.

His body was buried in Tashkent in the Botkin Cemetery.

== Awards and honors ==
- 1944: Order of Lenin
- 1948: Stalin Prize of the third class (for the development and introduction of new methods of drawing up the short-term and long-term weather forecasts)
- 16 January 1950: Order of the Red Banner of Labour
- 23 August 2004: Order of Outstanding Merit – posthumous award by presidential decree of the Republic of Uzbekistan

== Selected works ==
- Романовский В. И. Элементарный курс математической статистики. (Elementary course in mathematical statistics) – М.-Л. Госпланиздат, 1924.
- Романовский В. И. Элементы теории корреляции. (Elements of correlation theory) 1928 г. – 148 pages.
- Романовский В. И. Математическая статистика. (Mathematical statistics) – М.-Л. Гос.объед. научно-тех.изд. НКТП СССР. 1938. – 527 pages
- Романовский В. И. Элементарный курс математической статистики. (Elementary course in mathematical statistics) – М.-Л. Госпланиздат, 1939. – 359 pages
- Романовский В. И. Введение в анализ. (Introduction to analysis) – Ташкент. Гос.учебно-педагог. изд., 1939. – 436 pages
- Романовский В. И. О предельных распределениях для стохастических процессов с дискретным временем. (On limiting distributions for stochastic processes with discrete time) – Изд. Среднеаз. Гос. Унив. Ташкент, 1946. – 24 pages
- Романовский В. И. Применения математической статистики в опытном деле. (Applications of mathematical statistics in the test case) – Гостехиздат, М.-Л.,1947. – 248 pages
- Романовский В. И. Основные задачи теории ошибок. (The main tasks of the theory of errors) – ОГИЗ. Гостехиздат, М.-Л., 1947. – 116 pages
- Романовский В. И. Дискретные цепи Маркова. (Discrete Markov chains) – Гостехиздат, М.-Л. 1949. – 436 pages
- Романовский В. И. Математическая статистика. Кн.1. Основы теории вероятностей и математической статистики. (Mathematical statistics. Book 1. Fundamentals of the theory of probability and mathematical statistics) – Ташкент, 1961. – 637 pages
- Романовский В. И. Математическая статистика. Кн.2. Оперативные методы математической статистики. (Mathematical statistics. Book 2. Operational methods of mathematical statistics) – Ташкент, 1963. – 794 pages
- Романовский В. И. Избранные труды. Т.1. (Selected Works. V.1) – Изд-во "Наука" Узб. ССР. Ташкент. 1961.
- Романовский В. И. Избранные труды. Т.2. (Selected Works. V.2) – Теория вероятностей, статистика и анализ. (Theory of probability, statistics and analysis) Изд-во "Наука" Узб. ССР. Ташкент. 1964. – 390 pages

== See also ==
- Romanovski polynomials
