= Nikolay Kucherskiy =

Uzbek industrialist

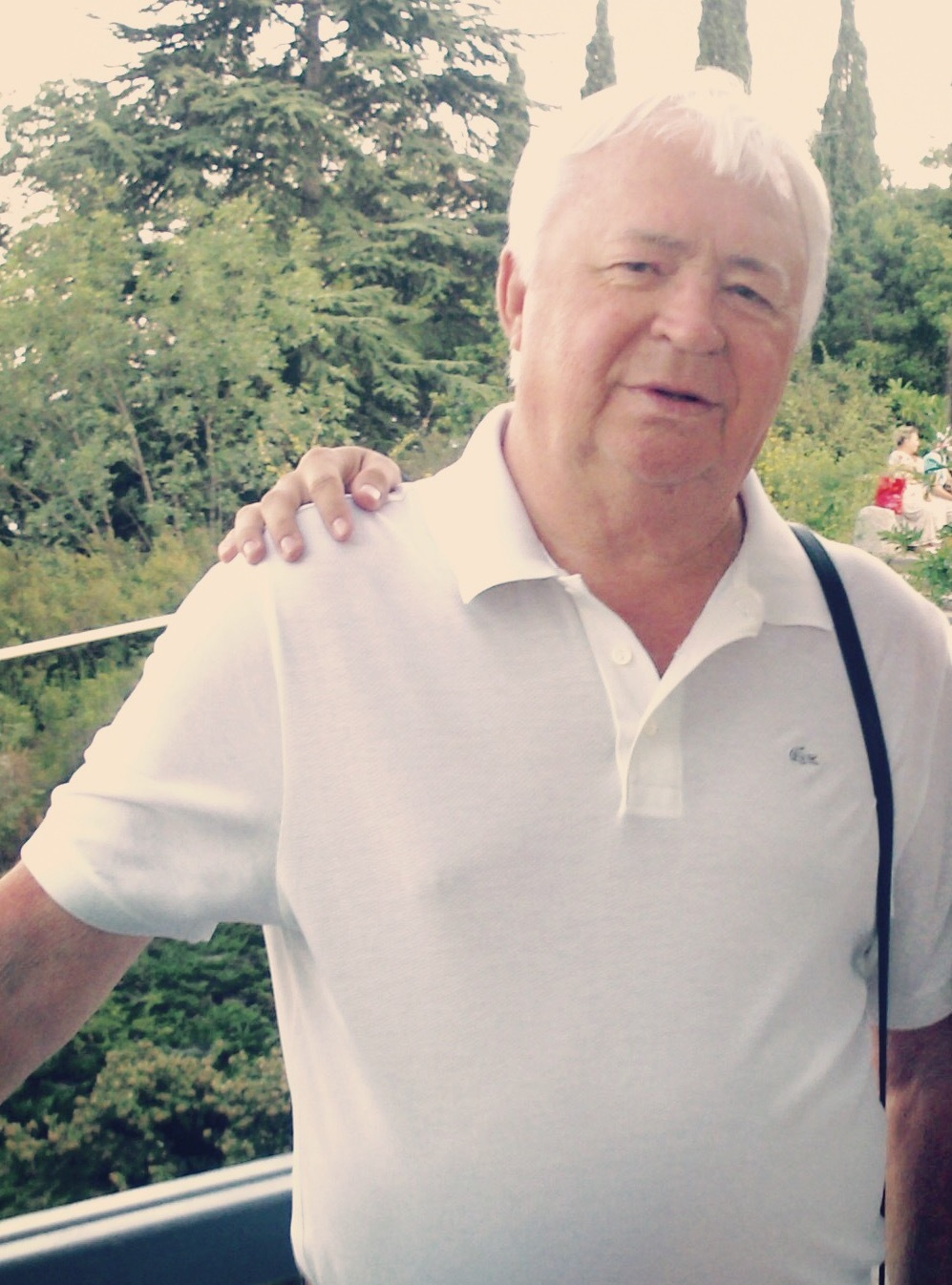
- Born: Nikolay Ivanovich Kucherskiy; 21 July 1937; Melitopol, Ukrainian SSR, Soviet Union
- Died: 13 December 2018 (aged 81); Moscow Oblast, Russia
- Occupation: industrialist

Nikolay Ivanovich Kucherskiy (Russian: Николай Иванович Кучерский; 21 July 1937, Melitopol – 13 December 2018, Moscow Oblast) was a Russian industrialist and the General Director of the Navoi Mining and Metallurgy Combine from 1985 to 2008. He had been working at the Navoi Mining and Metallurgy Combine since 1961. He was awarded the title of Hero of Uzbekistan in 1996.

== Biography ==
Nikolay Kucherskiy was born on 21 July 1937, in Melitopol. In 1961, he graduated from the Dnipropetrovsk Mining Institute with a degree in mining engineering. He started his professional career in 1961 as a mining master in Uchkuduk and went on to work as a section chief, quarry manager, chief engineer, and later as the director of the Central Ore Department.

Throughout his career, Kucherskiy was closely involved with the uranium and gold mining industry in Uzbekistan. In 1985, he was appointed as the General Director of the Navoi Mining and Metallurgy Combine. Kucherskiy held a Doctor of Technical Sciences degree and was recognized as an Honored Engineer of Uzbekistan. He was a professor at the Navoi State Mining Institute and the Tashkent Institute for the Design, Construction, and Operation of Roads. He conducted scientific research during his career. Kucherskiy also served as a member of the Oliy Majlis (parliament) and the Senate of the Oliy Majlis of the Republic of Uzbekistan. He died on 13 December 2018, in one of the clinics in the Moscow region, and was buried in Moscow at the Khovanskoye Cemetery.

== Awards ==
- Hero of Uzbekistan (26 August 1996)
- "El-yurt hurmati" ordeni (Order of "Respected by the People and the Homeland") (25 August 2000)
- "Order of Outstanding Merit" (20 July 2007)
- "Doʻstlik" ordeni (Order of "Friendship") (25 August 1994)
- Order of Prince Yaroslav the Wise, 5th class (17 July 2000, Ukraine).
- Order of Merit, 3rd class (16 December 2002, Ukraine).
- Order of the October Revolution (1983)
- Order of the Red Banner of Labour (1970)
- Order of the Badge of Honour (1966)
- Two USSR State Prizes (1980 and 1987)

== See also ==
- Elmira Bosithonova
- Hasan Normurodov
