= Malika Abdullahodjaeva =

Soviet and Uzbek pathologist (1932–2018)

- Born: 28 November 1932; Moscow, Russian SFSR, USSR
- Died: 26 June 2018 (aged 85)
- Education: Tashkent State Medical Institute; Brain Institute of the USSR Academy of Medical Sciences
- Awards: Hero of Uzbekistan; 2006
- Scientific career
- Fields: Pathology
- Thesis: Распределение и содержание некоторых белковых веществ в микроструктурах кожно-двигательного анализатора (1960)

Malika Samatovna Abdullahodjaeva (Uzbek: Malika Samadovna Abdullaxoʻjayeva; 28 November 1932 – 26 June 2018) was a Soviet and Uzbek pathologist, a full member of the Academy of Sciences of Uzbekistan and a Hero of Uzbekistan (2006).

== Early life and education ==
Abdullahodjaeva was born on 28 November 1932 in Moscow in a family of students of the Communist University of the Toilers of the East.

Abdullahodjaeva graduated from Tashkent secondary school No. 110 in 1950 with a golden medal, the medical faculty of the Tashkent State Medical Institute (TashGosMI) (1956, with honors), and postgraduate studies at the Brain Institute of the USSR Academy of Medical Sciences (laboratory of histochemistry) in 1960. On 27 December 1960, she defended her dissertation for the Candidate of Medical Sciences degree at the Academic Council of the Medical and Biological Department of the USSR Academy of Medical Sciences.

In 1968, Abdullahodjaeva defended her doctoral dissertation. In 1970 she was approved as a professor.

== Career ==
Abdullahodjaeva worked at the Tashkent State Medical Institute from 1963 until 1969. She simultaneously headed the pathomorphological department with the histochemistry laboratory at the Research Institute of Radiology, Radiology, and Oncology of the Ministry of Health of the Uzbek SSR.

Starting in 1969, Abdullahodjaeva served as head of the Department of Pathological Anatomy, Tashkent State Medical Institute. In 1990, after the institute's division, she headed the Department of Pathological Anatomy of the Second TashMI, which she led until 2000.

From 1972 to 1997, Abdullahodjaeva was the chief pathologist of the Ministry of Health of the Republic of Uzbekistan.

In 1995, she was elected a corresponding member, and in 2000 a full member (academician) of the Academy of Sciences of Uzbekistan.

Abdullahodjaeva is an author of many guidelines and manuals, including for foreign students, and an atlas for students of the Faculty of Dentistry. From 1997 to 1999 Abdullahodjaeva published the first Uzbek two-volume textbook for third-year students of medical universities, Fundamentals of Human Pathology.

Malika Abdullahodjaeva died on 26 June 2018.

== Awards and honors ==
Abdullahodjaeva is an Honored Scientist of the Uzbek SSR (1980). She was awarded the Medal "For Labour Valour" (1970), the Order of the Badge of Honor (1976), Medal "Veteran of Labor" (1984), Medal "Oliy Talim A'lochisi" (2000), the Order "Mekhnat Shukhrati" (2003). In 2006 he was awarded the title of "Uzbekiston Qahramoni" ("Hero of Uzbekistan") with the award of the "Gold Star".
