= Ravshanbek Qurbonov =

Uzbek physician, state and political figure

Ravshanbek Davletovich Qurbonov
- Born: December 5, 1947 (age 78); Khiva
- Education: Samarkand Medical Institute
- Occupations: Physician, State and Political Figure
- Notable work: Founded and headed arrhythmology at the Research Institute of Cardiology
- Title: Hero of Uzbekistan (2016)
- Awards: Academician of the Academy of Sciences of Uzbekistan (2017), Hero of Uzbekistan (2016)

Ravshanbek Davletovich Qurbonov (born December 5, 1947) is an Uzbek physician, state and political figure, deputy of the Oliy Majlis of the I and II convocations, senator of the Oliy Majlis of the Republic of Uzbekistan of the IV convocation. In 2017, he became an academician of the Academy of Sciences of Uzbekistan. In 2016, he was awarded the title of Hero of Uzbekistan.

== Biography ==
Ravshanbek Qurbonov was born on December 5, 1947, in Khiva. After graduating from high school with a gold medal, in 1966 he entered the Samarkand Medical Institute, which he graduated with honors in 1972 and until 1976 worked as a therapist in the city of Khiva. Under the guidance of Professor N. A. Mazur and Academician E. I. Chazov, he underwent clinical residency, postgraduate and doctoral studies at the Scientific Center of Cardiology. In 1981, he defended his PhD thesis, and in 1987 his doctoral dissertation on the problem of diagnosis and treatment of ventricular arrhythmias.

In 1981, Qurbonov founded and headed a new direction in the Research Institute of Cardiology - arrhythmology. A laboratory of arrhythmia was created, the most advanced methods of diagnosis at that time were introduced: 24-hour ECG monitoring, bicycle ergometry, transesophageal electrocardiostimulation, allapinin was studied and introduced into clinical practice. The revolution in the treatment of cardiac arrhythmias saved the lives of many thousands of patients in Uzbekistan and the countries of the Eurasian Economic Union. Aklezin, ecdysten, cavergal, axaritmin and other drugs were studied.

In 1997, Ravshanbek headed the Republican Research Institute of Cardiology, which under his leadership by 2003 became one of the best medical institutes in the country and was transformed into the Republican Specialized Center of Cardiology. In the center, the scientific potential of the Research Institute of Cardiology was combined with clinical practice. As part of the RSCK, specialized cardiological scientific and practical departments were organized for the first time in the republic, a mobile cardiological scientific and production complex was created. Under his leadership, a unified system of cardioservice was organized, capable of solving the most complex tasks related to the diagnosis, prevention and treatment of cardiovascular diseases.

As part of the RSCK, 9 specialized cardiological departments were organized for the first time in the republic in the main areas of cardiology and 3 high-tech departments: interventional arrhythmology, X-ray endovascular surgery and cardiac surgery, in which the entire spectrum of modern surgical interventions was mastered.

The results of many years of research by the Center of Cardiology under the leadership of Qurbonov in the field of prevention of cardiovascular diseases and the development of tactics for the treatment of acute coronary syndrome led to the modernization of medical care, to an increase in the coverage of thrombolysis of patients with myocardial infarction over 50% and an annual increase in the detection of patients with hypertension and risk factors for CVD by 3-4%. At different times, he worked as the chief therapist of the Ministry of Health of Uzbekistan (1988-1992), organizer and rector of the Urgench branch of the I Tashkent Medical Institute (1992-1995), since 1995 - chief cardiologist of the Ministry of Health. Director of the Research Institute of Cardiology of the Ministry of Health of the Republic of Uzbekistan.

In 1994–2004, he was elected deputy of the Oliy Majlis of the I and II convocations, in 2005-2009 he was deputy of the Kengash of People's Deputies of Tashkent. Senate of the Republic of Uzbekistan. In 2020, he was elected a member of the Senate of the Oliy Majlis of Uzbekistan and works in the Senate Committee on Defense and Security Issues.
