= Musa Yerniyazov =

Uzbek politician

Chairman of the Parliament of Karakalpakstan
- In office 3 May 2002 – 31 July 2020
- Preceded by: Temur Kamolov
- Succeeded by: Atabek Davletov (acting); Murat Kamalov

Personal details
- Born: Musa Tajetdinovich Yerniyazov; 20 December 1947 Kegeyli District, Uzbek SSR, Soviet Union
- Died: 31 July 2020 (aged 72) Nukus, Karakalpakstan, Republic of Uzbekistan
- Party: CPSU (before 1991)
- Spouse: Amangul Yerniyazova
- Education: Tashkent Institute of Irrigation and Agricultural Mechanization Engineers

Musa Tajetdinovich Yerniyazov (20 December 1947 – 31 July 2020) was a Soviet and Uzbek state and political figure. He was Chairman of the Parliament of Karakalpakstan, as well as member and Deputy Chairman of the Senate of Uzbekistan.

== Life ==
In 1971, he graduated from the Tashkent Institute of Irrigation and Agricultural Mechanization Engineers. After graduating from the institute, he worked as an engineer from 1971 to 1975, and then as the head of the automated system of the 25 mobile column. In 1986, he graduated from Tashkent Higher Party School. From 1983 to 1989, he served as Minister of Housing and Communal Services of Karakalpak Autonomous Soviet Socialist Republic. From 1989 to 1990, he was a permanent representative of the Council of Ministers of Karakalpakstan to the Cabinet of Ministers of the USSR. In 1998, he became the chairman of the Council of Ministers and from 2000 to 2001, was the Head of the Chimbay District.

In May 2002 he was elected to the Oliy Majlis. He was reelected three times in 2005, 2010, and 2015.

== Health and death ==
On 24 June 2020, Yerniyazov confirmed his infection with COVID-19, while he was located in the Nukus branch of the Republican Specialized Surgical Scientific and Practical Medical Center. He was diagnosed with a very severe case of COVID-19 infection, bilateral pneumonia. He also suffered from such side diseases as diabetes, hypertension, arterial hypertension. On 18 July 2020, the press service of the Ministry of Health reported that Yerniyazov was infected with a Coronavirus infection, while his health was stable and treated in Nukus. Later it became known that his health deteriorated. He died on 31 July 2020 due to complications caused by the coronavirus infection. Yerniyazov was succeeded as Chairman by Atabek Davletov, and later by Murat Kamalov.

== Awards ==
- Order of Labour Glory
- Order "For Selfless Service"
- Honored Builder of Uzbekistan
- Hero of Uzbekistan

== See also ==
- Hasan Normurodov
