= Gayratdin Xojaniyazov =

Soviet archaeologist

Gayratdin Xojaniyozov
- Born: July 11, 1948; Qoraoʻzak District, Karakalpak ASSR
- Died: October 19, 2020 (aged 72)
- Occupations: Archaeologist, senator
- Years active: 1972-2020
- Known for: The history of fortification of ancient Khorezm

Gayratdin Xojaniyozov (born July 11, 1948, in Qoraoʻzak District, Karakalpak ASSR — died October 19, 2020) was a Soviet archaeologist, director of the Archaeology Department of the Institute of History, Archaeology and Ethnography of the Academy of Sciences of the Republic of Uzbekistan, Karakalpak Branch, senator (2015), and Hero of Uzbekistan.

== Biography ==
Gayratdin Xojaniyazov was born on July 11, 1948, in a village in Qoraoʻzak District. In 1972, he graduated from the History Faculty of the Karakalpak State Pedagogical Institute (now Nukus State Pedagogical Institute named after Aziniyoz) and entered the Archaeology Department of the Institute of History, Archaeology and Ethnography of the Academy of Sciences of Uzbekistan, Karakalpak Branch.

In 1996, he defended his dissertation on “The History of Fortification of Ancient Khorezm” and received the scientific degree of Candidate of Historical Sciences under the scientific supervision of Professor German Fedorov-Davydov, head of the Archaeology Department of Moscow State University named after M. V. Lomonosov. Gayratdin Xojaniyazov was a member of many scientific archaeological expeditions, the author of popular scientific books and more than 130 scientific articles on archaeology, the history of fortification of ancient Khorezm in the Middle Ages, and the social and religious monuments of Uzbekistan.

From 1990 to 1994, Gayratdin Xojaniyazov served as the acting chairman of the Society for the Protection of Historical and Cultural Monuments of the Republic of Karakalpakstan, from 1994 to 2000, he was a member of the Republican Commission on the Issues of Naming the Names of Famous People to Toponymic Objects, from 1995 to 2000, he was a member of the State Award named after Berdakh. In 2015, Gayratdin Xojaniyazov became a senator from the Republic of Karakalpakstan.

== Awards ==
- Hero of Uzbekistan (2008)
- Order of Labour Glory (Uzbekistan) (2003)
