= Hamza Mahkamov =

Uzbek railway worker and engineer

- Born: 1959; Surxondaryo Region, Uzbek SSR, USSR
- Died: 16 March 2010 (aged 50–51)
- Occupations: railway worker, machinist
- Awards: Hero of Uzbekistan

Hamza Mahkamov (born in 1959, Surxondaryo Region, Uzbek SSR — March 16, 2010) was an Uzbek railway worker and engineer who was honored with the title "Hero of Uzbekistan" in 2007.

== Biography ==
Mahkamov Hamza began his work in labor in 1977 as a cotton picker at the Denov Cotton Cleaning Plant. Later, he worked as a mechanic at an automotive repair shop in the same area . From 1982, he served as an assistant locomotive driver at the 166th railway machine station (construction) in the field of railway transport, and from 1987 until the end of his life, he worked as a station locomotive driver. He was involved in the construction of the Toshguzar-Boysun-Qumqoʻrgʻon railway. Dozens of specialists were mentored by Hamza Mahkamov. Besides, he actively participated in public life in the Surxondaryo region.

On August 22, 2007, by the decree of the President of the Republic of Uzbekistan I. A. Karimov, Mahkamov Hamza, a locomotive driver of the railway construction mechanism at the 166th machine station of the "Uzbekistan Railways" joint-stock company, involved in the construction of the Toshguzar-Boysun-Qumqoʻrgʻon "railway," was honored with the title of "Hero of Uzbekistan" with the Order for "distinguished state services and contributions to the country’s independence and strengthening its international influence". He died in March 2010.

== Awards ==
- Hero of Uzbekistan (2007)
