= Lola Murotova =

Uzbekistani farmer and politician

Member of Senate of Uzbekistan
- In office 2020–2022

Personal details
- Born: Lola Neʼmatovna Murotova; 9 March 1958 Oltiariq District, Fergana Region, Uzbek SSR, Soviet Union
- Died: 30 May 2022 (aged 64) Oltiariq District, Fergana Region, Republic of Uzbekistan
- Party: Uzbekistan Liberal Democratic Party

Lola Neʼmatovna Murotova (Murodova) (9 March 1958 – 30 May 2022) was a recipient of the title Hero of Uzbekistan. She was an Uzbek farmer. She was a member of Senate of Uzbekistan from 2020 to 2022.

She was a farmer more than 40 years. She founded the farming enterprise "Nurli obod" and managed it until the end of her life.

A documentary film dedicated to life and work of her was made by the order of "Oʻzbekkino" national agency.

== Childhood and youth ==
Lola Murotova was born on March 9, 1958, in Altiariq, Fergana, Uzbekistan. She was the second child in the family. Her father worked as a tractor driver, a mechanic, and then an engineer at a collective farm. She participated in the Second World War. When her brother Nabijon Murotov was an engineer at the collective farm, Lola Murotova drove tractors.

== The hero of Uzbekistan award ==
In accordance with the Decree of the President of the Republic of Uzbekistan on awarding the title of Hero of Uzbekistan dated August 28, 2019, on the occasion of the 28th anniversary of the independence of the Republic of Uzbekistan, Lola Murotova was awarded the highest title of Hero of Uzbekistan and was awarded the highest award - the Gold Star Medal. While presenting Lola Murotova with the Hero of Uzbekistan award, Shavkat Mirziyoyev said about her:

"When I go to Fergana, I will definitely go to my sister Lola. What will happen this year, sister Lola, I ask. They carry out grain and cotton plans even in the most difficult years. Why? This woman has such love for the Motherland in her heart that you don't need to talk about it. These simplicity and sincerity are the symbol and example of an Uzbek woman."

== Documentary film ==
According to the order of the national agency "Uzbekkino", a documentary film dedicated to the life and work of Lola Murotova, Hero of Uzbekistan, was shot by the "Documentary and Chronicle Film Studio". The presentation of the film took place on December 4, 2020, at the Islam Karimov Theater-Concert Palace in Fergana. At the presentation ceremony, the deputy governor of Fergana region, Fayzulla Kasimov, spoke and thanked the creators of the documentary film. The screenwriter of the film was Zebokhon Kabilova, associate professor of the Kokan State Pedagogical Institute, the film was directed by Daniyor Shokirov and Said Dalilkhan Said Turgutkhanov was the cameraman.

During her career, she was appointed a member of the senate of the Oliy Majlis from Fergana region.

== Death ==
On March 6, 2022, news spread that Lola Murotova was undergoing treatment. On May 12, the press secretary of the president, Sherzod Asadov, wrote that Lola Murotova was seriously ill. On the same day, on the instructions of the President of the Republic of Uzbekistan, Deputy Prime Minister Shuhrat Ganiyev, Minister of Health Behzod Musayev, Deputy Advisor to the President Abdurashid Jurabayev and Press Secretary of the Head of State Sherzod Asadov received information about the condition of Lola Murotova.

On May 13, when Shavkat Mirziyoyev met with activists of the Fergana region, he spoke about Lola Murotova and said:

I had a problem last night. Sister Lola was supposed to sit in the hall today. But they got sick. When I tried to go and see it myself, the doctors told me not to disturb the patient. I was very disappointed. I sent many doctors. We pray to the Creator that they will recover soon and return to our ranks

Later, news spread on social networks that Lola Murotova had died. In response to this news, the press service of the Fergana regional government informed that "the reports are baseless" and that Lola Murotova is being treated in the hospital, her condition being reported as "stable and serious".

The National News Agency of Uzbekistan was the first to report on the death of Lola Murotova on May 30, 2022. After that, in connection with the death of the hero of Uzbekistan, the President of the Republic of Uzbekistan Shavkat Mirziyoyev expressed his condolences to her family members and relatives. The names of Tanzila Norboyeva, Nurdinjon Ismailov, Abdulla Aripov, Khairullo Bozorov, Shuhrat Ganiyev, Oktam Haitov were also mentioned in the condolence letter.

At the beginning of his speech at the video selector meeting held on May 31, 2022, regarding measures to provide the population with food, including livestock and poultry products, under the chairmanship of President Shavkat Mirziyoev, he remembered the hero of Uzbekistan, Lola Murotova:

I knew Lola Khan very well for many years. Recently, she was ill and receiving treatment. We always talked with that person and communicated sincerely. Despite her illness, she was always in a cheerful mood, worried about her country, and lived with devotion to her profession. They did not stop for a minute from honest and selfless work. During her life, sister Lola Khan went through many difficulties and trials. Showing strong will and perseverance, they lived only forward. I admired the sister's great enthusiasm and courage. She became the symbol of a real Uzbek peasant woman and lived as a real hero of our time. I am sure that the big school created by sister Lolakhan will be continued by her students and our young people who are growing up. The bright memory of this selfless and patriotic compatriot will always remain in our hearts.

== Awards ==
- Hero of Uzbekistan (28 August 2019)
- Honored Worker of Agriculture of Uzbekistan
- Order of "El-yurt hurmati"
- Order "For Selfless Service"
