= Buloqboshi =

- urban-type settlement
- Location in Uzbekistan
- Coordinates: 40°37′20″N 72°30′10″E
- Country: Uzbekistan
- Region: Andijan Region
- District: Buloqboshi District
- Urban-type settlement status: 2009

Population (2016)
  - Total: 32,200
- Time zone: UTC+5 (UZT)

Buloqboshi (also spelled as Bulakbashy, Uzbek: Buloqboshi, Булоқбоши, Russian: Булакбаши) is an urban-type settlement in Andijan Region, Uzbekistan. It is the administrative center of Buloqboshi District. Its population was 32,200 in 2016.
