= Uchqoʻrgʻon District =

Coordinates: 41.1214°N 72.0936°E

Uchqoʻrgʻon
- District
- Uchqoʻrgʻon tumani
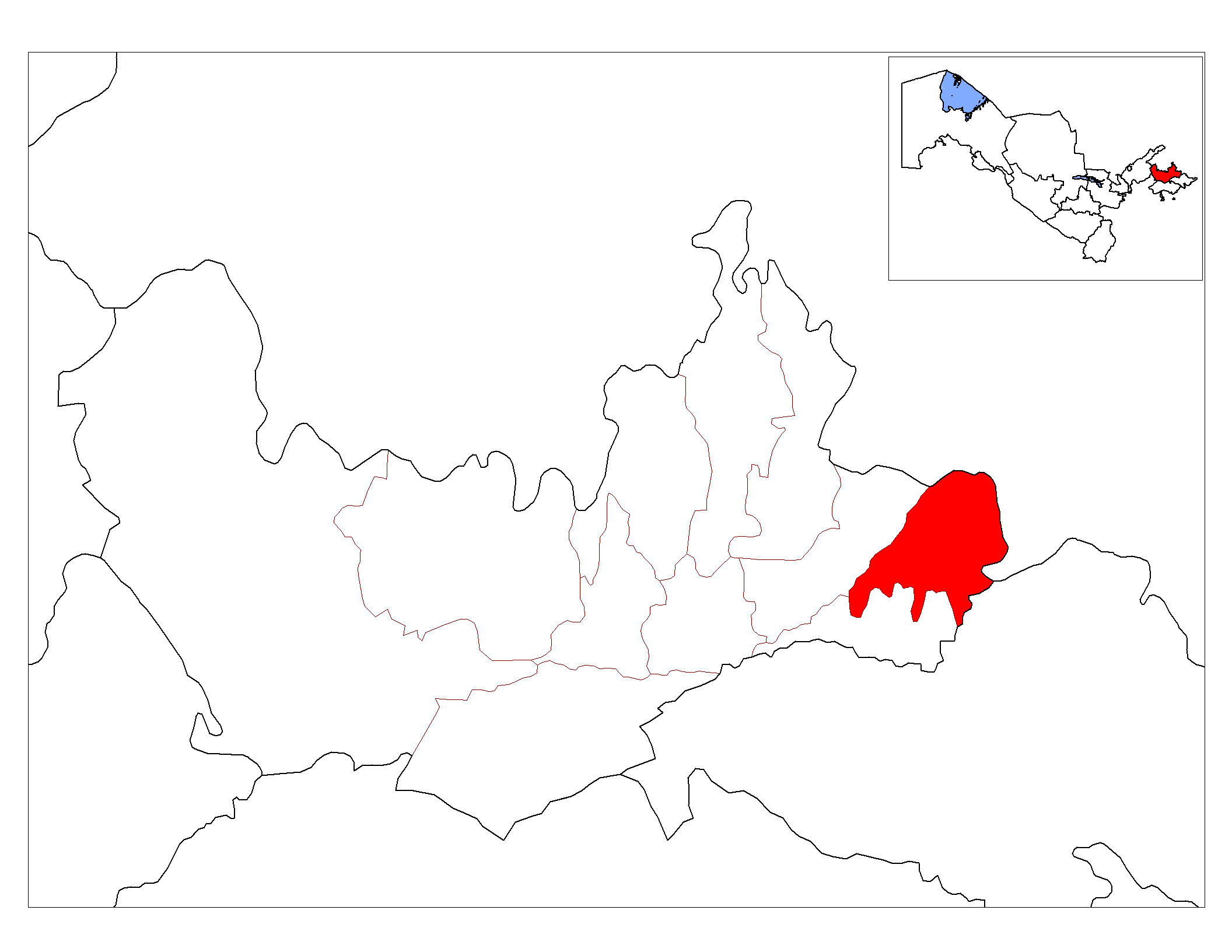
- Country: Uzbekistan
- Region: Namangan Region
- Capital: Uchqoʻrgʻon
- Established: 1935

Area
  - Total: 300 km^{2} (120 sq mi)

Population (2021)
  - Total: 174,600
  - Density: 580/km^{2} (1,500/sq mi)
- Time zone: UTC+5 (UZT)

Uchqoʻrgʻon is a district of Namangan Region in Uzbekistan. The capital lies at the city Uchqoʻrgʻon. Its area is 300 km^{2}. Its population is 174,600 (2021 est.).

The district consists of one city (Uchqoʻrgʻon), 4 urban-type settlements (Qayqi, Qoʻgʻay, Uchyogʻoch, Yangiobod) and 8 rural communities.
