= Bulak-Bashy =

Bulak-Bashy or Bulak-Bashi may refer to the following places in Kyrgyzstan:

- Bulak-Bashy, Leylek, a village in the Leylek District, Batken Region
- Bulak-Bashy, Batken, a village in the city of Batken, Batken Region
- Bulak-Bashy, Jalal-Abad, a village in the Ala-Buka District, Jalal-Abad Region
