= Oʻzbekiston Adabiyoti va Sanʼati =

Uzbek-language newspaper

- Owner: State-run
- Founded: 1956
- Ceased publication: 2023
- Language: Uzbek
- Headquarters: Tashkent

Oʻzbekiston Adabiyoti va Sanʼati was an Uzbek-language literary newspaper. It was one of the longest-running publications dedicated to literature in Uzbekistan. The publication was discontinued in 2023. A new publication, Jadid, was presented as its successor and began publication in 2024.

The first issue of Oʻzbekiston Adabiyoti va Sanʼati was published on January 4, 1956 under the name Oʻzbekiston madaniyati. It was later renamed to Oʻzbekiston adabiyoti va sanʼati. While early issues were published twice a week, the newspaper later switched to larger issues published once a week.
