= Vera Pak =

Uzbekistani pegagogue and statesman (1938–2018)

- Vera Pak
- Born: Vera Borisovna Pak; November 13, 1938; Kungrad region, Karakalpak ASSR, Uzbek SSR, Soviet Union
- Died: October 26, 2018 (aged 79); Khiva, Uzbekistan
- Education: Karakalpak State Pedagogical Institute
- Occupations: Pedagogue, stateswoman
- Known for: Director of Khiva Orphanage No. 20; Senator of the Oliy Majlis (2005–2010)
- Awards: Hero of Uzbekistan; Honored Worker of Public Education of the Republic of Uzbekistan

Vera Borisovna Pak (Uzbek Cyrillic: Вера Борисовна Пак; 13 November 1938 – 26 October 2018) was an Uzbek pedagogue, stateswoman, and public figure. She served as Senator of the Oliy Majlis (2005-2010), director of the Khiva Orphanage No. 20, and has been awarded with Hero of Uzbekistan and Honored Worker of Public Education of the Republic of Uzbekistan awards.

== Early life and education ==
Vera Pak was born on 13 November 1938 in the Kungrad region of the Karakalpak ASSR. After graduating from the Karakalpak State Pedagogical Institute (now Nukus State Pedagogical Institute, named after Ajiniyaz) in 1961, Pak worked at secondary school No. 3 in Khiva.

== Career ==
From 1984 to 1985, Pak served as an inspector for labor training in the Khiva City public education department. In 1985, Pak was appointed a director of Khiva Orphanage No. 20. She held this position until her death.

Pak was repeatedly elected a member of the Women's Committee of Uzbekistan, a member of the Republican Council of the People's Democratic Party of Uzbekistan, and a deputy of the regional and city Kengashes of People's Deputies.

In 2005, Pak was elected a senator of the Parliament of Uzbekistan Oliy Majlis. As a member of the Senate, she was a member of the Oliy Majlis group for cooperation with the National Assembly of the Republic of Korea. Pak was a deputy of the Khiva district Kengash of People's Deputies.

Vera Pak died on 28 October 2018.

== Awards and honors ==
In 1992, Pak was awarded the title of Honored Worker of Public Education of the Republic of Uzbekistan, and in 2001 – the title of Hero of Uzbekistan.
