= Muhabbat Sharapova =

Mathematician

- Born: 1949 (age 75–76); Shahrisabz, Uzbekistan
- Occupation: Mathematician
- Honours: Hero of Uzbekistan

Muhabbat Arapovna Sharapova is a mathematician from Uzbekistan. She has received the title O‘zbekiston Qahramoni (Hero of Uzbekistan).

== Biography ==
Sharapova has a page on the Uzbekistani government's Republican Center of Spirituality and Enlightenment (Respublika Ma'naviyat va Ma'rifat Markazi). According to the page, which provides most of the information for her early life, Sharapova was born in 1949 in Shahrisabz as one of eight children. Her mother had dreamed of teaching and pushed Sharapova to become a math teacher. In 1971, she graduated from Samarkand State University and began to teach at a school in Karshi, which became known for its mathematics.

In 2000, Sharapova started teaching mathematics at a specialized boarding school in Karshi, Kashkadarya region. In 2007, she received a national award as an Honored Worker in Public Education. In 2016, she was made a Hero of Uzbekistan. According to the Uzbekistani embassy in Ukraine, this award is given to honor "significant achievements before the state and the people."

== Recognition ==
Sharapova was recognized as one of the BBC's 100 Women of 2017, which called her "one of the best mathematicians in Uzbekistan."
