= Ozod Sharafiddinov =

Uzbek literary scholar

- Born: 1 March 1929; Okhunqaynar, near Kokand
- Died: 4 October 2005 (aged 76)
- Education: Central Asian State University (now the National University of Uzbekistan)
- Occupations: Literary Scholar and Critic
- Title: Hero of Uzbekistan (August 23, 2002)
- Awards: State Prize named after Beruniy (1970), Orders "Outstanding Merit" (1999), "Labor Glory" (1997)

Ozod Sharafiddinov (1 March 1929 - 4 October 2005) is a literary scholar and critic. He was born in the village of Okhunqaynar near Kokand. He graduated from the 14th secondary school in Tashkent, the Faculty of Philology of the Central Asian State University (now the National University of Uzbekistan) in 1951. He completed his postgraduate studies in Moscow, received his PhD degree in 1955. Ozod Sharafiddinov studied the problems of poetry, wrote literary-critical articles on Uzbek poetry and its state. His scientific-creative and literary-critical researches of that period are reflected in the work “Time. Heart. Poetry” (1962). In the 60–80s of the 20th century, he promoted the life and work of Cholpon. Ozod Sharafiddinov created literary portraits of the representatives of Uzbek literature such as Oybek, Gafur Gulyam, Abdulla Qahhor, Shaykhzoda, Mirtemir, Zulfiya: “Jewels of Talent” (1976), “Literary Studies” (1968), “Abdulla Qahhor” (1988), “The First Miracle” (1979). The book of literary-critical sketches “The Seekers of Beauty” (1974), which was created on the works of the representatives of other literatures, occupies an important place in the scientist's work. Ozod Sharafiddinov reflected the situations in the Uzbek literary process from the 60s of the XX century to the XIX century in the works such as “Talent is the Property of the People” (1979), “Literature is the Lesson of Life” (1981), “Searching for Beauty” (1985), “Loyalty to the Truth” (1988), “Pages of Passion” (1999), “President” (2003).

== Works ==
Sharafiddinov's work history can be divided into two periods. The first period took place in the Soviet totalitarian system, where he studied the problems of protecting literature from the totalitarian ideology, conducting research on the basis of literary laws (“The Laughter of Zaharxanda”, 1962; “The Charm of Liveliness, the Inertia of Schematism”, 1979; “The Last Line Became the Glory of the Homeland”, 1979; “There is a Lot of Poetry, but Where is the Poet?”, 1983). The second period is the main period of his critical activity, which covers his work in the years of independence. In this period, Sharafiddinov studied the problems of shaping the national literature, rebuilding the Uzbek literary scholarship and criticism, assimilating the traditions of world literature and improving the art of translation (“Let’s Speak in One Language”, 1987; “A Stone of Wisdom from a Bunch of Words”, 2000; “Where are You, Moriko?”, 2002).

Sharafiddinov became known as a literary scholar in the 60s of the 20th century. In the book “Time. Heart. Poetry” (1962), he analyzed literary works from the point of view of artistic laws. His researches are devoted to the analysis of literature on the basis of national ideas and literary laws. In the book “Literary Studies” (1968), he discussed the issues of the creative personality and its place in the artistic work. His scientific articles included in the collections “The Seekers of Beauty” (1974), “Jewels of Talent” (1976) are about the traditions, means of studying the classical literature and the problems of studying the world literature. Sharafiddinov initiated the tendencies of accepting the national and world literature traditions in harmony in the Uzbek literary scholarship and criticism.

Sharafiddinov illuminated the important issues of Uzbek poetry, prose and criticism in the works “The First Miracle” (1979), “Talent is the Property of the People” (1979), “Literature is the Lesson of Life” (1980), “In Harmony with Life” (1983), “Searching for Beauty” (1985).

In the years of independence, Ozod Sharafiddinov performed great works as a literary critic, translator, and public figure. His aesthetic principles are reflected in the books “Cholpon” (1991), “Understanding Cholpon” (1994), and the works “Why I Changed My Belief” (1997). In the following years, Ozod Sharafiddinov wrote dozens of articles on Uzbek writers, cultural and art figures, and scientists. He translated the works of many representatives of world literature into Uzbek. For example, “A Sunbeam in the Water” (Françoise Sagan), “Examples of Ancient Chinese Prose”, “Monumental Propaganda” (Vl. Boyanovich), “The Alchemist” (Paulo Coelho) and others.

=== Translated works ===
Sharafiddinov introduced the concept of criticism to the art of translation. He translated Lev Tolstoy's “Confession”, Paulo Coelho's “The Alchemist”, A. Sevelin's “Stop the Plane, I’ll Fall Off” into Uzbek.

== Uzbek literature in harmony with world literature ==
Sharafiddinov initiated the tradition of studying Uzbek literature in harmony with world literature. In his books “The Patriots of Independence” (1993), “The Titles of Passion” (1999), “On the Ways of Spiritual Perfection” (2001), he analyzed the works of Abdurauf Fitrat, Abdulhamid Cholpon, Usmon Nosir, Abdulla Qahhor, Oybek, Gafur Gulyam, Maqsud Shaykhzoda, Otajon Hoshimov from a new perspective. In the work “Understanding Cholpon” (1993), he discussed and analyzed the complex path that the new Uzbek criticism had gone through in the 20th century, and illuminated the works and aesthetic principles of many critics in relation to Cholpon's work. Sharafiddinov is one of the authors of the curriculum “The History of Uzbek Literature of the 20th Century” (1997), and the textbook “The Uzbek Literature of the 20th Century” (1999).

The essence of Sharafiddinov's work is the book “Ijodni anglash baxti” (The Fortune of Understanding the Art) (2004). In it, he examined the place and scientific-spiritual values of Uzbek literature in the world literary process.

== Awards ==
Ozod Sharafiddinov was a professor at the National University of Uzbekistan until the mid-90s of the 20th century. He was the deputy editor-in-chief of the journal “Tafakkur” in 1995–1997. He has been the editor-in-chief of the journal “World Literature” since 1997. Ozod Sharafiddinov is the laureate of the state prize named after Beruniy (1970), the owner of the orders “Outstanding Merit” (1999), “Labor Glory” (1997). On August 23, 2002, Ozod Sharafiddinov was awarded the title of “Hero of Uzbekistan”.
