= Uchqoʻrgʻon =

Uchqoʻrgʻon Uzbek: Учқўрғон / Uchqoʻrgʻon
- City
- Location in Uzbekistan
- Coordinates: 41°07′17″N 72°05′37″E
- Country: Uzbekistan
- Region: Namangan Region
- District: Uchqoʻrgʻon District

Government
  - Governor: Jakhongir Rizzayev

Population (2016)
  - Total: 40,000
- Time zone: UTC+5 (UZT)
- Postal code: 160900-160904

Uchqoʻrgʻon (/ˌʊtʃkɜːrˈɡɒn/; Uzbek: [ˌʉtʃqɵɾˈʁɒn]) is a city and seat of Uchqoʻrgʻon District in Namangan Region in eastern Uzbekistan. In 1989 it had a population of 23,772, and 40,000 in 2016.

In 1969 Uchqoʻrgʻon was granted city status. The city has cotton-cleaning and oil-extracting factories.

Ittifoq settlement is located nearby.

== Etymology ==
Uchqoʻrgʻon is translated from Uzbek as "three kurgan" or "three fortifications".
