= Buloqboshi District =

Coordinates: 40°37′N 72°30′E

Buloqboshi
- District
- Buloqboshi tumani
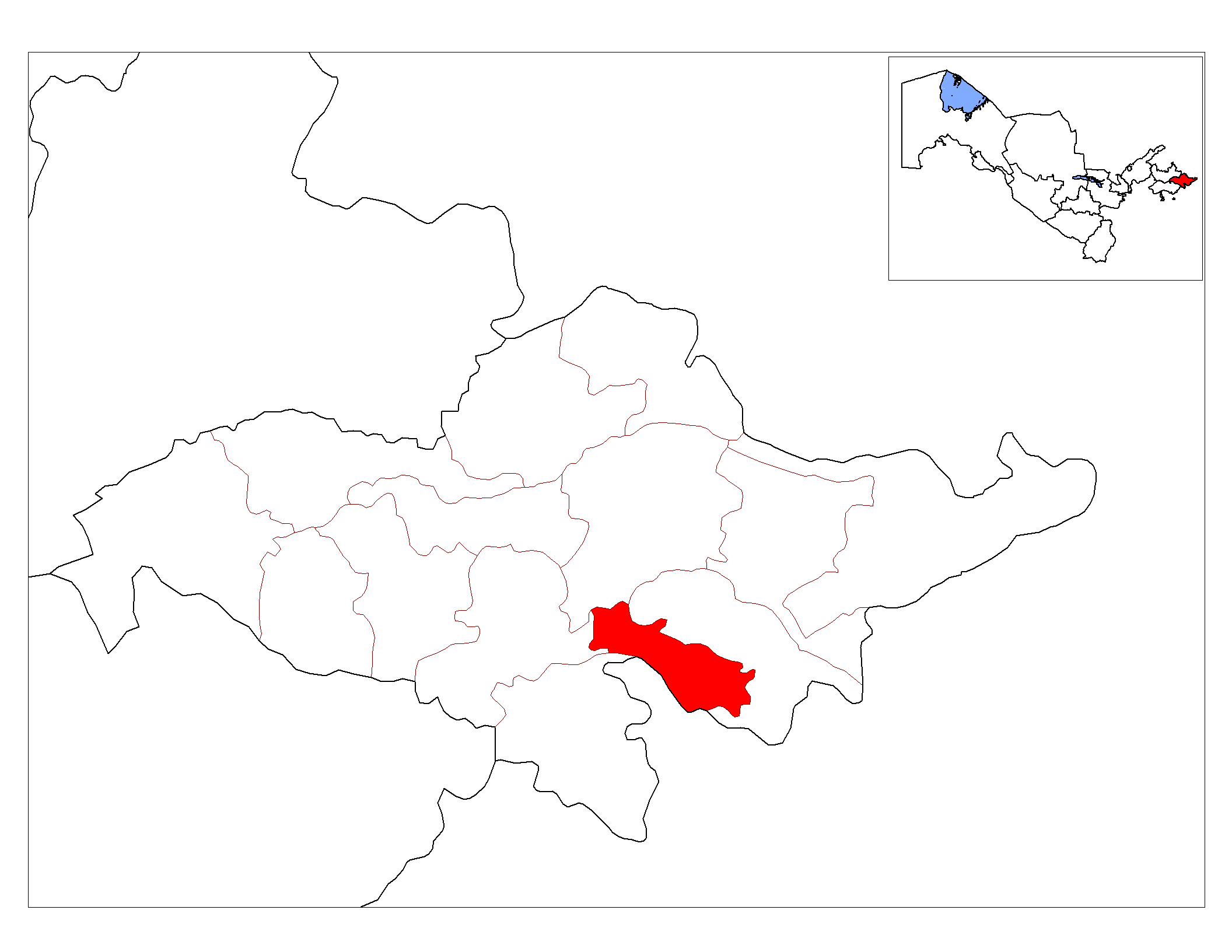
- Country: Uzbekistan
- Region: Andijan Region
- Capital: Buloqboshi
- Established: 1992

Area
  - Total: 180 km^{2} (69 sq mi)

Population (2022)
  - Total: 147,000
  - Density: 820/km^{2} (2,100/sq mi)
- Time zone: UTC+5 (UZT)
- Postal code: 170500
- Area code: +9987477

Buloqboshi is a district of Andijan Region in Uzbekistan. The capital lies at Buloqboshi. It has an area of 180 km^{2} (69 sq mi) and it had 147,000 inhabitants in 2022.

The district consists of 4 urban-type settlements (Buloqboshi, Andijon, Uchtepa and Shirmonbuloq) and 5 rural communities.
