= Sharq Taronalari =

International music festival in Uzbekistan

Sharq taronalari (Oriental Melodies) is UNESCO listed international music festival that is held in every two years since 1997 in Registan square of ancient Samarkand. Vocalists from different nations and countries participate in the festival.

== History ==
Sharq taronalari is one of the biggest music and cultural festivals in Central Asia. 1996 was announced as the year of Amir Temur in Uzbekistan. And a glorious statue of Amir Temur was set in the center of Samarkand. The first president of Uzbekistan, Islam Karimov awarded Samarkand with the special award "Amir Temur" in October 18, 1996. Since then, 18th October is considered as the day of Samarkand in Uzbekistan. Since 1997, this festival, held every two years in Registan Square in Samarkand, gathers the most talented singers, dancers and musicians from different countries of the world. Sharq Taronalari is a UNESCO listed international cultural event and is popular for those who want to learn more about Uzbekistan and its heritage. Representatives from 32 countries of the world took part in the "Sharq Taronalari" international music festival held for the first time.

== The Festival ==
Registan is the jewel of Amir Temur's capital, the city center that attracted the brightest minds of that time. Scholars, artists, architects and poets each contributed to this legendary city, making it one of the main stops on the Silk Road and a center of learning in Asia. Centuries later, Samarkand again became the center of world culture, representatives of its people and culture take part in this international festival. "Sharq taronalari" ("Oriental Melodies") will be held on an open-air stage, equipped with the latest lighting and sound, surrounded by medieval monuments. In addition to the performances, there are also exhibitions and conferences for participants, guests and the media.

According to tradition, 3 major international organizations: UNESCO, CIS, representatives of Organization for Security and Co-operation in Europe, foreign organizations and other high-ranking guests visit as guests of honor.

Visit exhibitions of traditional Uzbek clothing and musical instruments, and stay for the gala concert at the end of the festival where all the nominees and winners will perform. Sharq Taronalari lasts an entire week.
