= Elmira Bosithonova =

Uzbek physician and political figure

- Born: Elmira Erkinovna Bositxonova; November 10, 1958 (age 67); Tashkent, Uzbek SSR, USSR
- Occupations: physician, statesman and politician
- Awards: Order of Labor Fame

Elmira Basithanova (Uzbek: Elmira Erkinovna Bositxonova; born on November 10, 1958, in Tashkent, Uzbek SSR, USSR) is an Uzbek physician and political figure in Uzbekistan. In January 2020, Uzbekistan's President Shavkat Mirziyoyev appointed her as a member of the Senate of the Oliy Majlis of the Republic of Uzbekistan for the IV convocation.

== Biography ==
Elmira Erkinovna was born on November 10, 1958. In 1981, she graduated in the field of "medicine" from the Tashkent Medical Academy. From 1981 to 2011, she worked initially as a medical intern, then as an anesthesiologist-resuscitator, later as a head of department, and eventually as the chief physician of the emergency hospital in Tashkent providing urgent medical care.

In June 2011, she was appointed Deputy Prime Minister of Uzbekistan and Chairperson of the Women's Committee of Uzbekistan. From December 12, 2016, she held the position of Deputy Minister of Health of the Republic of Uzbekistan. From June 2019 to February 19, 2020, she served as the Vice Prime Minister of Uzbekistan and was also the Chairperson of the Women's Committee of Uzbekistan.

In June 2019, she once again led the Women's Committee of Uzbekistan and became the Deputy Prime Minister. In mid-January 2020, President Shavkat Mirziyoyev appointed her as a member of the Senate.

Since February 2020, she has been the First Deputy Minister for Mahalla and Family Affairs of Uzbekistan. From July 3, 2020, she served as the First Deputy Minister of Health of Uzbekistan.

== Awards ==
- Mehnat shuhrati ordeni (Order of Labor Fame) (2014)
