= Aysanem Alliyarova =

Uzbek community and political figure

- Born: September 20, 1964 (age 61); Taxtakópir District, Karakalpakstan ASSR, Uzbekistan SSR, USSR
- Occupations: social and political figure, senator
- Awards: Doʻstlik ordeni(Order of Friendship)

Aysanem Joldasbaevna Alliyarova (born 1964) is an Uzbek community and political figure, and a senator.

== Biography ==
Aysanem Alliyarova was born on September 20, 1964, in the Karakalpak ASSR in the Taxtakópir District. She graduated from the Tashkent State Institute of Culture. She worked as a librarian initially. Currently, she serves as the deputy head of the Taxtakópir District and holds positions as the chairperson of the Women's Committee in the district.

By the decree of the President of Uzbekistan on January 20, 2015, Aysanem Alliyarova was appointed as a senator. She is a member of the Senate's Committee on Science, Education, Culture, and Sports, as well as the chairperson of the Women's Committee. In 2014, Aysanem Alliyarova was honored with the "Do'stlik" Order.

== Awards ==
- Doʻstlik ordeni (Order of Friendship) (2014)
