= Taxtakópir District =

Coordinates: 43°01′21″N 60°17′19″E

Taxtakópir district Тахтакөпир районы, Taxtakópir rayonı
- District
- Taxtakópir district
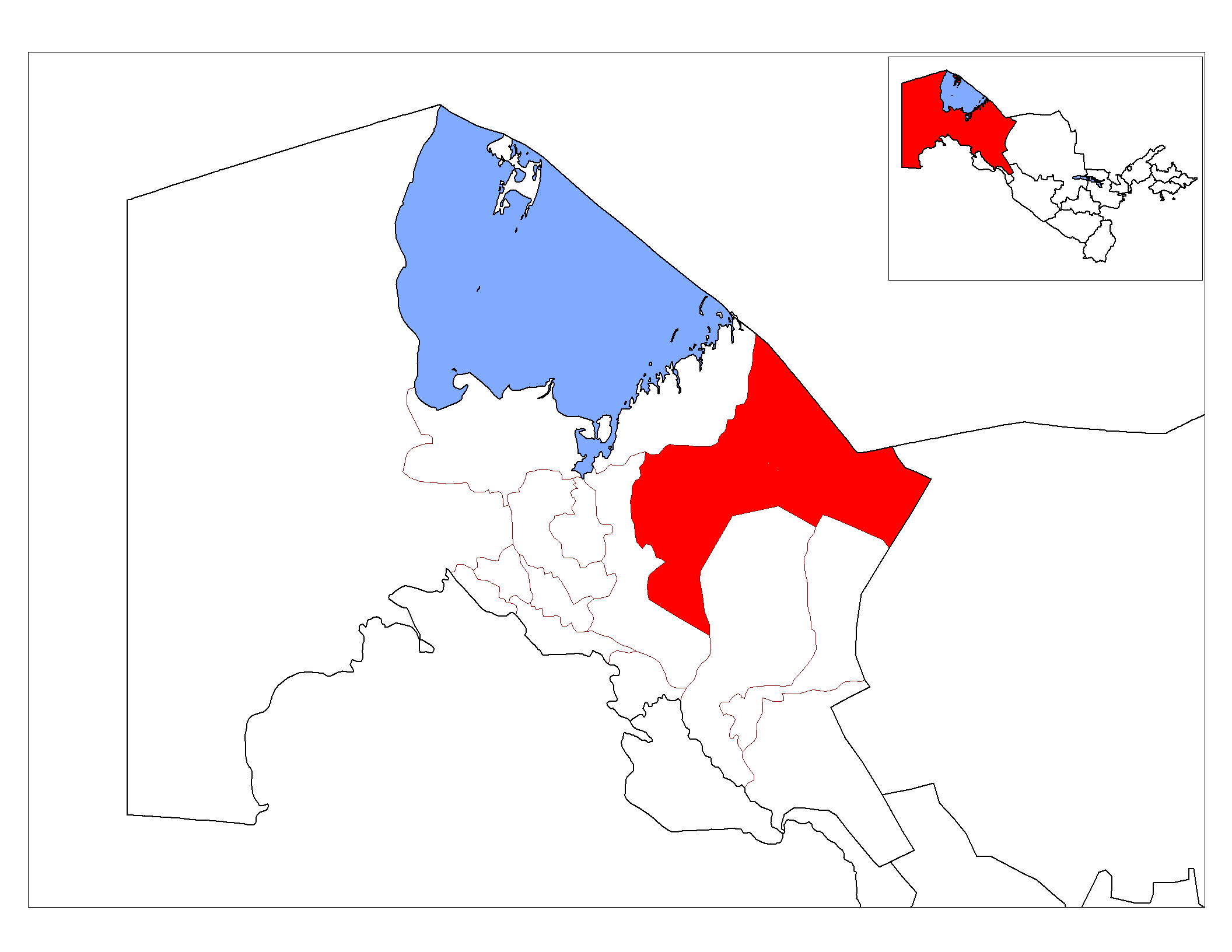
- Country: Uzbekistan
- Autonomous Republic: Karakalpakstan
- Capital: Taxtakópir

Area
  - Total: 21,120 km^{2} (8,150 sq mi)

Population (2022)
  - Total: 40,600
  - Density: 1.92/km^{2} (4.98/sq mi)
- Time zone: UTC+5 (UZT)

Taxtakópir district (Karakalpak: Тахтакөпир районы, Taxtakópir rayonı) is a district of Karakalpakstan in Uzbekistan. The capital lies at Taxtakópir. Its area is 21,120 km^{2} (8,150 sq mi) and it had 40,600 inhabitants in 2022.

There is one town Taxtakópir and eight rural communities Beltau, Jańadárya, Múlk, Atakól, Qara ay, Qaratereń, Qońiratkól, Taxtakópir.
