= Tashkent Medical Academy =

Medical school in Tashkent, Uzbekistan

- Uzbek: Toshkent tibbiyot akademiyasi
- Type: Public
- Established: February 24, 2005; 20 years ago
- Chancellor: Alisher Shadmanov
- Students: 6,249 (Fall 2020)
- Undergraduates: 5,441 (Fall 2020)
- Postgraduates: 808 (Fall 2020)
- Location: Tashkent, Uzbekistan
- Campus: Tashkent, Urgench, Fergana, Termez
- Website: tma.uz

The Tashkent Medical Academy or TMA (Uzbek: Toshkent tibbiyot akademiyasi; TMA) is a public undergraduate and graduate medical school.

It was founded in 1920 as the Faculty of Medicine at the Turkestan State University and renamed the Tashkent Medical Institute (ru.wikipedia.org: Ташкентский медицинский институт) in 1931, and became two separate Medical Universities: the First Tashkent State Medical Institute and the Second Tashkent State Medical Institute in 1990. The Tashkent Medical Academy was formed in 2005 by the Decree of the President of the Republic of Uzbekistan Islam Karimov by merging the First and Second Tashkent State Medical Institutes.

The main campuses are located in Tashkent, the capital of Uzbekistan. The TMA includes six faculties, 52 departments, the Multidisciplinary Clinic of TMA. There are three branches of TMA which function as independent institutions in the cities of Urgench, Termez and Fergana.

== History ==
=== Medical Faculty of Turkestan State University (1919-1931) ===
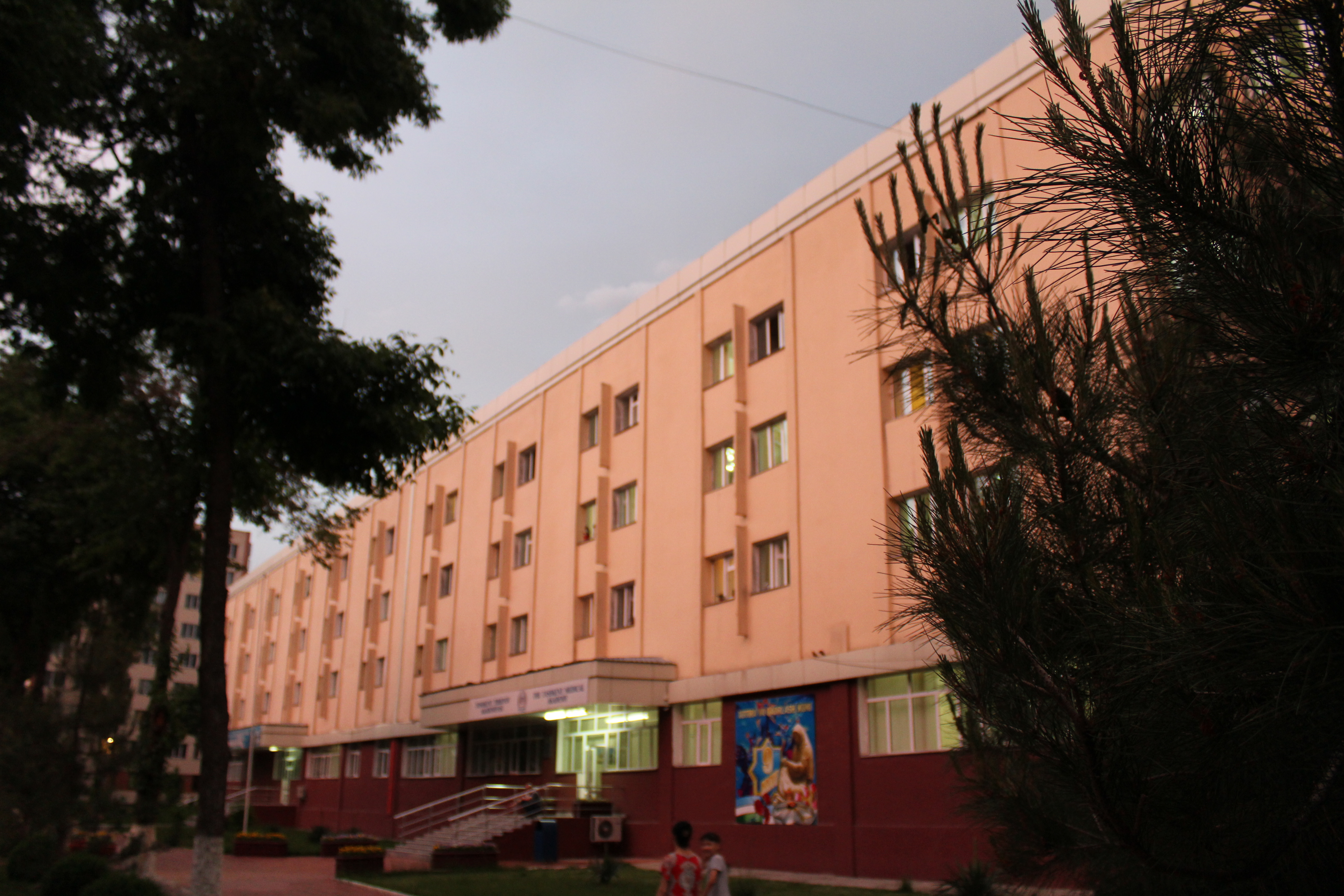
Tashkent Medical Academy

Given the urgent need for training doctors in Turkestan, on August 2, 1919, the Department of Higher Education Institutions approved the organization of a medical faculty at Turkestan State University. On September 17, 1919, the opening of the first Turkestan State University took place, and professor P.P. Sitkovsky (Ситковский П.П.) was elected dean of the medical faculty. 1919-1921 the material and technical base of the medical faculty was created, and in 1921, first medical students were enrolled for studies. Medical Faculty deans P.F.Borovsky (1926-1928) (Боровский П.Ф. ), N.I. Ragoza (1928-1929)). and G.P. Fedorov (1929-1931) made a great contribution to the medicine development.

=== Tashkent Medical Institute (1935-1990) ===
In 1931, Tashkent Medical Institute (Ташкентский медицинский институт) was established on the basis of the Faculty of Medicine at the Turkestan State University. The first rector was G.P. Fedorov, who was then worked as the dean as of the medical faculty. The second rector of the institute was Kh.U. Umarov.

During the World War II (1941-1945), more than 10 evacuation hospitals were opened at the Tashkent Medical Institute, and professors e.g. D.A. Vvedensky (Введенский Д.А.), L.D. Vasilenko, A.M. Geller, B.A. Stekolnikov and others went to the front of war. Of 2,122 doctors trained during the World War II period, 1,630 of them were sent to the front. In memory of those who died during the war, the names of A.A. Airapetov, R.L. Aminov, A.Yu. Gulkorov, G.D. Mukhanov, V.I. Mazhitov, R.S.Oripov, N.G. Raschenko, Z.S.Rzhevsky, U.Z. Umarova and U. Khikmatkhozhaeva.were carved in gold letters in the history of the Tashkent Medical Institute.

A 6-year study was established after the Second World War. During this period, new educational programs were created by professors and faculty members.

In 1972, the Tashkent Pediatric Medical Institute was established, and students from the faculty of pediatrics of Tashkent Medical Institute were transferred there.

Foreign students were accepted for studies since 1961. In 1980, their number exceeded to 170.

1980-1990 was a period of active international collaborations between Universities of Russia, Ukraine, Belarus, Hungary, Germany, Poland and others. During these years, students began to enter the leading medical Universities of Russia and Ukraine.

=== First and Second Tashkent State Medical Institutes ===
By the decision of the Cabinet of Ministers in 1990, on the basis of the old and new campuses of Tashkent Medical Institute in Tashkent, two medical institutes were formed: the First Tashkent State Medical Institute and the Second Tashkent State Medical Institute. The first rector of the First Tashkent State Medical Institute was Professor, Academician of the Academy of Sciences T.A. Daminov, the rector of the Second Tashkent State Medical Institute became professor Kh.Ya. Karimov. At the initial stage, the First Tashkent State Medical Institute had medical and dental faculties, and the Second Tashkent State Medical Institute had medical and sanitary-hygienic faculties.

== Changing the status of Tashkent Medical Academy ==
Tashkent Medical Academy was reorganized on the basis of abolished First and Second Tashkent State Medical Institutes through the Decree of the President of the Republic of Uzbekistan Islam Karimov N-3629 as of 19 July 2005.

According to the Decision of the State Testing Center at the Cabinet of Ministers of the Republic of Uzbekistan the Tashkent Medical Academy is given the status of "Higher Education Facility" (Certificate No.8 as of 31 March 2008). As a result, by the year 2030 Tashkent medical academy will be accredited from academy to a state institute.

== Position in rankings ==
In 1972, Tashkent Medical Institute was awarded the Order of the Red Banner of Labour which is the labour counterpart of the military Order of the Red Banner.

On April 22, 2020, Times Higher Education (THE) listed TMA as one of the best universities in the world for the first time, making it a 301+ ranking in Medicine and Health Sciences out of 721 universities included. The publication evaluated the results of statistical analysis of activities, data audit, the results of an annual global survey of representatives of the international academic community, employers, as well as the financial performance of the university.

== Faculties ==
As of September 2005, the TMA has six faculties for undergraduate studies, over 40 Master's degree/Residency programs in medicine and Life sciences, over 50 departments in medicine, biology, education, social and humanitarian subjects, faculty of continuous medical education.

Undergraduate programs:

1. Faculty of Medicine (6 years)
2. Faculty of Medicine and Medical Education (6 years)
3. Faculty of Preventive Medicine (5 years)
4. Faculty of Military Medicine
5. Faculty of Higher Education Nursing School (3 years)
6. Faculty of Medical Biology (4 years)

== Research ==
Basic and bench research is carried out by the faculty of the departments, independent researchers, graduate students, doctoral students, students and applicants in priority areas of medicine and biology. The TMA is the basis for preclinical research and clinical approbation of c, their implementation in health care practice, in the system of higher and professional education.

About 50 doctoral and over 250 master's theses are defended at TMA annually.

=== Interuniversity Scientific Research Laboratory ===
Interuniversity Scientific Research Laboratory (IRSL) has the scope to organize interuniversity cooperation between universities, institutes of the Academy of Sciences of the Republic of Uzbekistan, enterprises and organizations (conclusion of economic contracts, agreements on scientific and technical cooperation) within the framework of the integration of education and science.

The activities of ISRL are directly related to the educational and scientific work of the academy. Scientific directions are carried out on the basis of state grants approved by the Committee for the Coordination of the Development of Science and Technology under the Cabinet of Ministers of the Republic of Uzbekistan. ISRL in its activities is guided by regulatory and legislative documents concerning the activities of research institutions
