= Hasan Normurodov =

Uzbekistani politician

- Born: Hasan Norbekovich Normurodov; November 16, 1939; Kattakurgan District, Samarqand Region, Uzbek SSR
- Died: April 21, 2021 (aged 81); Samarkand, Samarqand Region, Uzbekistan
- Occupations: teacher of Uzbek language and literature
- Years active: 1956-2021
- Awards: "Mehnat shuhrati ordeni" (2008); "El-yurt hurmati ordeni" (2012); "Doʻstlik ordeni" (2017); "Hero of Uzbekistan" (2019)

Hasan Normurodov (16 November 16, 1939, Kattakurgan District, Samarqand Region, Uzbek SSR — 24 April 2021, Samarkand, Samarqand Region, Uzbekistan) was a state and public figure, the head of the Samarqand Region branch of the "Nuroniy" public association, and a Hero of Uzbekistan.

He was awarded the title Hero of Uzbekistan in 2019 and was a recipient of the "Mehnat shuhrati" (2008), "El-yurt hurmati" (2012), and "Doʻstlik" (2012) orders. He was a member of the People's Democratic Party of Uzbekistan in the Samarqand Region Council, and a member of the Senate of the Republic of Uzbekistan (2020–2021).

During his more than 60 years of dedicated work, Hasan Normurodov held various state positions in the Samarqand Region. During his leadership, several economic and social development projects were implemented in various areas of the Samarqand Region. In 2017, with his initiative, 16 the abode of the luminaries were established in the Samarqand Region.

== Biography ==
Hasan Normurodov was born into a farmer's family on November 16, 1939, in the Kichik korpa village of Kattakurgan District. After his father, Norbek, died during Hasan's childhood, his mother, Misqol, raised the four children by herself. After completing middle school, he pursued education at the pedagogical institute in Kattakurgan and later studied at the philology faculty of Samarkand State University. Starting at the age of 17, he worked as a teacher of Uzbek language and literature at a rural school, then became a youth leader, district youth committee leader, and department head in the Communist Party Committee of Samarqand Region, and held various positions within the party structure, including leadership roles in different areas. From 1988 to 1995, he served as the head of the public education department in Samarqand Region. From 1995 to 2003, he led the union of public education and science workers in the Samarqand Region. From 2003 to 2020, he headed the Samarkand branch of the "Nuroniy" public association, and from 2020 to 2021, he worked as the deputy head of the Samarqand Region's community and family support department. Before his death, he had been receiving treatment at the Samarkand branch of the Republican Specialized Scientific and Practical Medical Center. On 16 April 2021, during a visit to the Samarqand Region, President Shavkat Mirziyoyev received news about Hasan Normurodov's health condition while being treated at the scientific center. On 24 April 2021, in some sources reported as April 23, Hasan died at the age of 82 in Samarkand.

== Awards ==
In 2008, he was honored with the "Mehnat shuhrati" award, in 2012 with the "El-yurt hurmati" award, and in 2017 with the "Doʻstlik" order. On August 28, 2019, he was awarded the title of "Hero of Uzbekistan".

== Memory ==
The book titled "Yetuklikning yetti siri" published in 2019 by the journalist Abdukamol Rahmonov features individuals who have shown activity in the Samarqand Region, notably highlighting the life and work of Hasan Normurodov. In 2021, during an event commemorating the 30th anniversary of the establishment of the People's Democratic Party of Uzbekistan in Samarkand city, the name of Hasan Normurodov was remembered.
