= Hero of Uzbekistan =

- Type: Medal
- Presented by: Uzbekistan
- Eligibility: Citizens and non-citizens
- Status: Currently awarded
- Established: 5 May 1994

Highlights
- Total: 50+
- Ribbon bar of the award
- Related: Hero of the Soviet Union; Hero of Kazakhstan

Hero of Uzbekistan (Uzbek: Oʻzbekiston qahramoni, Cyrillic Ўзбекистон қаҳрамони) is the highest national award in the Republic of Uzbekistan. It is awarded to citizens of Uzbekistan and to non‑citizens for merit to the country. The title 'Hero of Uzbekistan' and the accompanying medal, the Oltin Yulduz ('Gold Star'), are awarded by the President of Uzbekistan. The parliament of Uzbekistan first created the law establishing the award on 5 May 1994, and since then more than 50 people have received it.

== History and creation ==
The title 'Hero of Uzbekistan' has its origins in its predecessor title, the Hero of the Soviet Union, which was the highest distinction in the Soviet Union and the Uzbek Soviet Socialist Republic from the award's creation on 16 April 1934 until the dissolution of the Soviet Union on 26 December 1991. The Supreme Soviet of the Republic of Uzbekistan, then the country's legislative body, created the Hero of Uzbekistan on 5 May 1994.

== Notable recipients ==
Awardee	Country	Date
Islam Karimov	Uzbekistan	1994
Abdulla Oripov	Uzbekistan	1998
Erkin Vohidov	Uzbekistan	1999
Vera Pak	Uzbekistan	2001
Ozod Sharafiddinov	Uzbekistan	2002
Malika Abdullahodjaeva	Uzbekistan	2006
Hamza Mahkamov	Uzbekistan	2007
Hasan Normurodov	Uzbekistan	2019
Musa Yerniyazov	Uzbekistan	2019
Lola Murotova	Uzbekistan	2019
Munojot Yulchiyeva	Uzbekistan	2021

== See also ==
- Hero of Russia
- Hero of Ukraine
- Hero of Belarus
- Orders, decorations, and medals of Uzbekistan
