= Svetlana =

Female given name

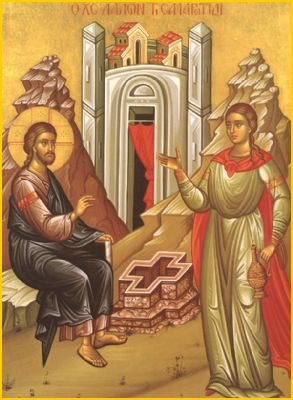
- Svetlana is often used in reference to the Samaritan woman at the well in the Biblical Gospel of John. It is the Russian version of the Greek saint name Photini, meaning "enlightened".
- Gender: Feminine

Origin
- Origin: Russia
- Meaning: "light"

Other names
- Derived: Sveta, Svetlanka, Svetulya, Svetunya, Svetusya, Svetukha, Svetusha, Veta, Svetka, Lana
- Related names: Svitlana, Sviatlana, Svjetlana, Świetlana

Popularity of the name Svetlana

Svetlana (Cyrillic: Светлана) is a feminine given name of Russian origin, deriving from the Slavic word svet (Cyrillic: свет), meaning "light". Derived forms include Sveta, Svetlanka, Svetulya, Svetunya, Svetusya, Svetukha, Svetusha, Veta, Svetka, and Lana.

Particularly unique among similar common Russian names, this one is not of ancient Slavic origin but was coined by Alexander Vostokov in 1802 and popularized by Vasily Zhukovsky in his eponymous ballad "Svetlana", the latter first published in 1813. It was adopted as the vernacular equivalent to the Greek name Photini, which was borne by a saint who has been identified with the Samaritan woman mentioned at Jacob's well in the Bible (John 4).

The name is also popular in Belarus, Bosnia and Herzegovina, North Macedonia, Serbia, Slovakia, and Ukraine, with a number of occurrences in non-Slavic-speaking countries.

Semantically similar names to this are Lucia (of Latin origin, meaning "light"), Claire ("light" or "clear" in French, equivalent to Spanish and Portuguese Clara), Roxana (from Old Persian, "little shiny star, light"), and Shweta (Sanskrit, "white, pure").

== Variants ==
The Ukrainian equivalent of the name is Svitlana (Світлана), the Belarusian is Sviatlana (Святлана), the Polish variant is Świetlana, and the Czech is Světlana. The Serbo-Croatian speaking area has three pronunciations: Ijekavian Svjetlana (Свјетлана), Ekavian Svetlana (Светлана) and Ikavian Svitlana (Свитлана) are used according to local customs.

== Diminutives ==
Russian-language diminutives and short forms include Sveta (Света), Svetlanka (Светланка), Svetulya (Светуля), Svetunya (Светуня), Svetusya (Светуся), Svetukha (Светуха), Svetusha (Светуша), Veta (Вета), Svetka (Светка), and Lana (Лана).

Sveta also means "saint" in Bulgarian. The Slavic element Svet means "blessed, holy, bright".

Serbian language diminutives of the name are Sveta (Света), and Ceca (Цеца, pronounced Tsetsa).

== People ==
- Svetlana Abrosimova (born 1980), Russian professional basketball player
- Svetlana Adyrkhaeva (1938–2023), Russian ballet dancer
- Svetlana Agapitova (born 1964), Russian activist
- Svetlana Alekseyeva (born 1970), Belarusian diver
- Svetlana Alexievich (born 1948), Belarusian journalist, writer
- Svetlana Alliluyeva (1926–2011), the youngest daughter of Joseph Stalin
- Svetlana Alpers (born 1936), American art historian, professor, writer and critic
- Svetlana Anastasovska (born 1961), Macedonian volleyball player
- Svetlana Anikey (born 1977), Belarusian actress
- Svetlana Anokhina, Russian human rights activist and journalist
- Svetlana Antipova (born 1966), Russian basketball player
- Svetlana Antonova (born 1979), Russian actress
- Svetlana Antonovska (1952–2016), Macedonian statistician
- Svetlana Babanina (born 1943), Soviet swimmer
- Svetlana Babich (born 1947), Soviet-Russian javelin thrower
- Svetlana Bachevanova, Bulgarian photographer
- Svetlana Badulina (born 1960), Soviet volleyball player
- Svetlana Baitova (born 1972), Belarusian artistic gymnast
- Svetlana Bakhmina (born 1969), Russian legal executive
- Svetlana Baskova (born 1965), Russian film director, screenwriter and painter
- Svetlana Bazhanova (born 1972), Soviet speed skater
- Svetlana Beriosova (1932–1998), Lithuanian-British ballerina
- Svetlana Berzina (1932–2012), Russian Egyptologist
- Svetlana Bessarab (born 1970), Russian politician
- Svetlana Bezrodnaya (born 1934), Russian conductor and music educator
- Svetlana Biryukova (born 1991), Russian long jumper
- Svetlana Bodritskaya (born 1971), Kazakhstani sprinter
- Svetlana Bogdanova, several people
- Svetlana Boginskaya (born 1973), Soviet Belarusian gymnast
- Svetlana Bojković (born 1947), Serbian actress
- Svetlana Boldykova (born 1982), Russian snowboarder
- Svetlana Bolshakova (born 1984), Belgian triple jump athlete
- Svetlana Bortnikova (born 1997), Kazakhstani footballer
- Svetlana Boyko, several people
- Svetlana Boym (1959–2015), Russian-American cultural theorist, artist, playwright and novelist
- Svetla Bozhkova (or Svetlana) (born 1951), Bulgarian discus thrower
- Svetlana Broz (1955–2025), Bosnian author and physician
- Svetlana Bubnenkova (born 1973), Russian cyclist
- Svetlana Bukareva (born 1981), Russian figure skater
- Svjetlana Bukvich, American/Bosnian-Herzegovinian music composer/artist
- Svetlana Buraga (born 1965), Belarusian heptathlete
- Svetlana Buravova-Khapsalis (born 1973), Kazakhstani water polo player
- Svetlana Burlak (born 1969), Russian linguist
- Svetlana Căpățînă (1969–2022), Moldovan politician
- Svetlana Cebotari (born 1969), Moldovan politician
- Svetlana Cenkova (born 1966), Czech volleyball player
- Svetlana Chepelnikova (born 1979), Belarusian speed skater
- Svetlana Cherkasova (born 1978), Russian middle-distance runner
- Svetlana Chernigovskaya (born 1994), Russian sprint canoeist
- Svetlana Chimrova (born 1996), Russian swimmer
- Svetlana Chmakova (born 1979), Russian-born comics artist
- Svetlana Cvetko, American cinematographer and film director
- Svetlana Dambinova (born 1949), Russian neuroscientist
- Svetlana Demidenko (born 1976), Russian athletics competitor
- Svetlana Demina (born 1961), Russian sport shooter
- Svetlana Deshevykh (born 1970), Kazakhstani cross-country skier
- Svetlana Druzhinina (born 1935), Soviet and Russian actress, film director, screenwriter and film producer
- Svetlana Đurković, Croatian-born anthropoligist and LGBT activist
- Svetlana Efremova (born 1970), Soviet-born American actress
- Svetlana Ershova (born 1994), Russian weightlifter
- Svetlana Fedorenko (1972–2009), Russian aviator
- Svetlana Fedotkina (born 1967), Russian speed skater
- Svetlana Feofanova (born 1980), Russian pole vaulter
- Svetlana Filippova (born 1990), Russian diver
- Svetlana Frantsuzova (1963–2022), Soviet figure skater
- Svetlana Galante (born 1973), Russian judoka and a sambo practitioner
- Svetlana Ganina (born 1978), Russian table tennis player
- Svetlana Gannushkina (born 1942), Russian human rights activist
- Svetlana Geier (1923–2010), Russian-German translator
- Svetlana Gerasimenko (1945–2025), Soviet and Tajikistani astronomer
- Svetlana Gerasimova (born 1951), Uzbek Soviet teacher
- Svetlana Gincheva (born 1956), Bulgarian rower
- Svetlana Gladysheva (born 1971), Russian alpine skier
- Svetlana Gnezdilov (born 1969), Ukrainian-born Israeli retired athlete
- Svetlana Golendova (born 1993), Kazakhstani sprinter
- Svetlana Gomboeva (born 1998), Russian archer
- Svetlana Goncharenko (born 1971), Russian sprinter
- Svetlana Gorokhovich, Russian pianist
- Svetlana Gorshenina, Uzbekistani historian of Central Asia
- Svetlana Goryacheva (born 1947), Russian stateswoman and political figure
- Svetlana Goundarenko (born 1969), Russian judoka and mixed martial arts fighter
- Svetlana Gounkina (born 1980), Russian golfer
- Svetlana Grankovskaya (born 1976), Russian cyclist
- Svetlana Grinberg (born 1944), Soviet table tennis player
- Svetlana Gromenkova, Russian poker player
- Svetlana Gusarova (born 1959), Kazakhstani track and field hurdler
- Svetlana Guskova (born 1957), Moldovan runner
- Svetlana Haustova (born 1968), Russian ski-orienteering competitor
- Svetlana Igumenova (born 1988), Russian taekwondo practitioner
- Svetlana Inamova (born 1951), Uzbekistani politician
- Svetlana Isakova (alpine skier) (born 1952), Soviet alpine skier
- Svetlana Isakova (swimmer) (born 1969), Latvian swimmer
- Svetlana Ischenko (born 1969), Ukrainian poet
- Svetlana Ishkova (born 1978), Argentine diver
- Svetlana Ishmouratova (born 1972), Russian biathlete and soldier
- Svetlana Issakova (born 1993), Estonian figure skater
- Svetlana Ivanova (born 1985), Russian actress
- Světlana Janáčková (born 1967), Czech volleyball player
- Svetlana Jaqypova (born 1968), Kazakhstani politician
- Svetlana Jitomirskaya (born 1966), American mathematician
- Svetlana Kalinkina (born 1970), Belarusian journalist
- Svetlana Kamotskaya (born 1964), Belarusian cross-country skier
- Svetlana Kapanina (born 1968), Russian aerobatic pilot
- Svetlana Karamasheva (born 1988), Russian middle-distance runner
- Svetlana Karpeeva (born 1985), Russian swimmer
- Svetlana Kasyan (born 1984), Russian-Kurdish operatic soprano
- Svetlana Katok (born 1947), Russian-American mathematician
- Svetlana Kaykan (born 1978), Russian speed skater
- Svetlana Kazanina (born 1971), Kazakhstani heptathlete
- Svetlana Khabirova (born 1978), Russian weightlifter
- Svetlana Kharitonova (1932–2012), Russian actress
- Svetlana Khodchenkova (born 1983), Russian actress
- Svetlana Khokhlova (born 1971), Kazakhstani rugby player
- Svetlana Kholomina (born 1997), Russian beach volleyball player
- Svetlana Khorkina (born 1979), Russian gymnast
- Svetlana Kirdina (born 1955), Russian sociologist
- Svetlana Kiseliova (born 1971), Ukrainian equestrian
- Svetlana Kitić (born 1960), Bosnian retired professional handball player
- Svetlana Kitova (1960–2015), Soviet middle-distance runner
- Svetlana Klyuchnikova (born 1984), Kazakhstani rugby union player
- Svetlana Klyuka (born 1978), Russian middle-distance runner
- Svetlana Klyukina (born 1989), Russian artistic gymnast
- Svetlana Knyazeva (born 1970), Russian equestrian
- Svetlana Kolesnichenko (born 1993), Russian synchronized swimmer
- Svetlana Konovalova (born 1990), Russian cross-country skier and biathlete
- Svetlana Kopystiansky, American-Russian visual artist
- Svetlana Kormilitsyna (born 1984), Russian fencer
- Svetlana Koroleva, several people
- Svetlana Koroleva-Babich (born 1947), Soviet javelin thrower
- Svetlana Korytova (born 1968), Russian volleyball player
- Svetlana Kotochigova, Soviet and American physicist
- Svetlana Kozić (born 1978), Serbian politician
- Svetlana Krachevskaya (born 1944), Soviet Olympic silver medalist in shot put
- Svetlana Krivelyova (born 1969), Russian shot putter
- Svetlana Krivencheva (born 1973), Bulgarian tennis player
- Svetlana Krivenok (born 1998), Russian Paralympic athlete
- Svetlana Krivonogikh (born 1975), Russian former cleaning woman and millionaire
- Svetlana Kryuchkova, several people
- Svetlana Kulikova (born 1980), Russian ice dancer
- Svetlana Kuritsyna (born 1992), Russian journalist
- Svetlana Kuzina (born 1975), Russian water polo player
- Svetlana Kuzmina (born 1969), Russian swimmer
- Svetlana Kuznetsova, several people
- Svetlana Lapina (born 1978), Russian high jumper
- Svetlana Laukhova (1973–2023), Russian hurdler
- Svetlana Lavochkina, Ukrainian writer
- Svetlana Lazebnik, Ukrainian-American researcher
- Svetlana Leseva (born 1967), Bulgarian high jumper
- Svetlana Leshukova (born 1974), Russian swimmer
- Svetlana Liapina (born 1967), Soviet ice dancer and skating coach
- Svetlana Lipatova (born 1993), Russian wrestler
- Svetlana Loboda (born 1982), Ukrainian singer
- Svetlana Louzanova (born 1977), Belarusian rhythmic gymnast
- Svetlana Lukasheva (born 1977), Kazakhstani middle-distance runner
- Svetlana Lukić (born 1958), Serbian journalist
- Svetlana Lunina, Soviet archaeologist
- Svetlana Lunkina (born 1979), Russian ballet dancer
- Svetlana Lyubetskaya (born 1971), Belarusian politician
- Svetlana Makarovič (born 1939), Slovenian writer, actress, illustrator and chanteuse
- Svetlana Malahova-Shishkina (born 1977), Kazakhstani cross-country skier
- Svetlana Maltseva (born 1970), Kazakhstani ice hockey player
- Svetlana Masterkova (born 1968), Russian middle-distance runner
- Svetlana Matić (born 1966), Serbian writer
- Svetlana Matveeva (born 1969), Russian chess player
- Svitlana Maziy (born 1968), Ukrainian rower
- Svetlana Medvedeva (born 1965), wife of Russian Prime Minister Dmitry Anatolyevich Medvedev
- Svetlana Medvedeva (sport shooter) (born 1992), Russian sport shooter
- Svetlana Melnikova (born 1951), Soviet discus thrower and shotputter
- Svetlana Metkina (born 1974), Russian actress
- Svetlana Mičić (born 1960), Croatian handball player
- Svetlana Milijić, Serbian politician
- Svetlana Mircheva (born 1976), Bulgarian artist
- Svetlana Mironova (born 1986), Russian orienteering competitor
- Svetlana Mironova (biathlete) (born 1994), Russian biathlete
- Svetlana Mironyuk (born 1968), Russian manager and media executive
- Svetlana Mojsov, Macedonian American chemist
- Svetlana Morgunova (1940–2024), Russian announcer for Soviet Central Television
- Svetlana Moshkovich (born 1983), Russian-Austrian cyclist
- Svetlana Moskalets (born 1969), Russian heptathlete
- Svetlana Mugoša-Antić (born 1964), Yugoslavian handball player
- Svetlana Munkova (born 1965), Uzbekistani high jumper
- Svetlana Myartseva, researcher and entomologist
- Svetlana Nageykina (born 1965), Soviet/Russian cross-country skier
- Svetlana Navasardyan (born 1946), Armenian pianist
- Svetlana Nekhorosh (born 1973), Ukrainian runner
- Svetlana Nemolyaeva (born 1937), Soviet and Russian actress
- Svetlana Nesterova, Russian composer
- Svetlana Nikishina (born 1958), Soviet volleyball player
- Svetlana Nikolaeva (born 1984), Russian pair skater
- Svetlana Nikolić Pavlović, Serbian doctor and politician
- Svetlana Novak, Paris-based film producer
- Svetlana Novikova (born 1974), Russian alpine skier
- Svetlana Ognjenović (born 1981), Serbian handball player
- Svetlana Orlova, several people
- Svetlana Ortiqova (born 1962), Uzbek lawyer and politician
- Svetlana Osipova (born 2000), Uzbekistani taekwondo athlete
- Svetlana Pachshenko (born 2000), Kazakhstani cyclist
- Svetlana Pakhomova (born 1965), Russian wheelchair curler
- Svetlana Pankratova (born 1971), world record-holder for longest female legs
- Svetlana Paramygina (born 1965), Soviet Belarusian biathlete
- Svetlana Parkhomenko (born 1962), Soviet-Russian tennis player and tennis coach
- Svetlana Pasti, Russian-Finnish media researcher
- Svetlana Penkina (1951–2016), Soviet actress
- Svetlana Pessova (born 1981), Turkmenistani high jumper
- Svetlana Petcherskaia (born 1968), Russian biathlete
- Svetlana Petko (born 1970), Russian footballer
- Svetlana Petrenko (born 1974), Moldovan chess player
- Svetlana Petriychuk (born 1980), Russian theater director
- Svetlana Pletneva (1926–2008), Russian archeologist and historian
- Svetlana Podobedova (born 1986), Russian-born Kazakhstani weightlifter
- Svetlana Polovinka (born 1977), Ukrainian volleyball player
- Svetlana Ponomarenko (born 1969), Russian long-distance runner
- Svetlana Popa, Moldovan politician
- Svetlana Pospelova (born 1979), Russian sprinter
- Svetlana Prokopyeva (born 1979), Russian journalist
- Svetlana Prudnikova (born 1967), Russian-Serbian chess player
- Svetlana Pryakhina (born 1970), Russian handball player
- Svetlana Kana Radević (1937–2000), Yugoslav and Montenegrin architect
- Svetlana Radkevich (born 1979), Belarusian speed skater
- Svetlana Radzivil (born 1987), Uzbekistani high jumper
- Svetlana Ražnatović (born 1973), Serbian pop-folk singer from Serbia
- Svetlana Razvorotneva (born 1968), Russian politician
- Svetlana Reingold, Israeli musicologist and curator
- Svetlana Rimsky-Korsakoff, Chinese-born Russian scholar
- Svetlana Romashina (born 1989), Russian synchronized swimmer
- Svetlana Roudenko, Russian-American mathematician
- Svetlana Rozhkova (born 1965), Russian actress and humorist
- Svetlana Rudalova (born 1984), Belarusian rhythmic gymnast
- Svetlana Rusu (born 1972), Moldovan politician
- Svetlana Saenko (born 1982), Moldovan wrestler
- Svetlana Samokhvalova (born 1972), Russian cyclist
- Svetlana Savchenko (born 1965), Russian and former Ukrainian politician
- Svetlana Savitskaya (born 1948), Soviet cosmonaut
- Svetlana Saykina (born 1985), Russian discus thrower
- Svetlana Selerneva (born 1964), Azerbaijani volleyball player
- Svetlana Selezneva (born 1969), Russian mathematician
- Svetlana Semyonova (born 1958), Russian rower
- Svetlana Șepelev-Tcaci (born 1969), Moldovan long-distance runner
- Svetlana Sergeeva (born 1986), Russian Paralympic athlete
- Svetlana Serkeli, Soviet ice dancer
- Svetlana Shcherbakova (born 1998), Russian weightlifter
- Svetlana Sheveleva (born 1997), Russian fencer
- Svetlana Shikshina (born 1980), Russian Go player
- Svetlana Shimkova (born 1983), Russian weightlifter
- Svetlana Shkolina (born 1986), Russian high jumper
- Svetlana Shnitko (born 1987), Russian sports sailor
- Svetlana Slapšak (born 1948), Slovenian anthropologist and historian
- Svetlana Sleptsova (born 1986), Russian biathlete
- Svetlana Smirnova, several people
- Svetlana Smolina, Russian concert pianist
- Svetlana Sokolova (born 1981), Russian heptathlete
- Svetlana Sokolovskaya (born 1965), Russian figure skating coach
- Svetlana Soluianova (born 1994), Russian boxer
- Svetlana Sorokina (born 1957), Russian journalist
- Svetlana Soulim (born 1974), Ukrainian volleyball player
- Svetlana Sourtseva (born 1984), Russian volleyball player
- Svetlana Spajić (born 1971), Serbian singer, performer, pedagogue, activist, and translator
- Svetlana Staneva (born 1990), Bulgarian boxer
- Svetlana Stević Vukosavljević (born 1948), Serbian singer
- Svetlana Stupina (born 2001), Kazakhstani footballer
- Svetlana Sukhishvili, polymer scientist
- Svetlana Surganova (born 1968), Russian rock musician, singer and poet
- Svetlana Svetlichnaya (1940–2024), Russian actress
- Svetlana Svirko (born 1969), Soviet and Russian actress
- Svetlana Tarasevich (born 1979), Belarusian gymnast
- Svetlana Tatunts, Armenian-born Russian researcher
- Svetlana Tchernousova (born 1970), Russian biathlete
- Svetlana Telbukh, Ukrainian performance artist
- Svetlana Terentieva (born 1983), Russian ice hockey forward
- Svetlana Tkacheva (born 1984), Russian ice hockey player
- Svetlana Todorova (born 1974), Bulgarian gymnast
- Svetlana Tolstaya (born 1971), Kazakhstani racewalker
- Svetlana Toma (born 1947), Soviet actress
- Svetlana Trefilova (born 1973), Russian ice hockey player
- Svetlana Trunova (born 1983), Russian skeleton racer
- Svetlana Tsarukaeva (born 1987), Russian weightlifter
- Svetlana Tširkova-Lozovaja (born 1945), Soviet fencer and coach
- Svetlana Tsydikova (born 1985), Russian footballer
- Svetlana Tsys, German model and beauty pageant titleholder
- Svetlana Tynkova (born 1993), Kyrgyzstani footballer
- Svetlana Ulmasova (1953–2009), Soviet long-distance runner
- Svetlana Ulyanova (born 1979), Russian weightlifter
- Svetlana Ussova (born 1999), Kazakhstani canoeist
- Svetlana Ustinova (born 1982), Russian actress
- Svetlana Uvarova (born 1964), Ukrainian psychoanalyst
- Svetlana Vakula (born 1977), Belarusian sprint canoer
- Svetlana Vanyo (born 1977), Russian swimmer
- Svetlana Varganova (born 1964), Russian swimmer
- Svetlana Vasilenko (born 1956), Russian writer
- Svetlana Vasilyeva (born 1992), Russian racewalker
- Svetlana Vasina (born 1971), Kazakhstani ice hockey player
- Svetlana Velmar-Janković (1933–2014), Serbian novelist and essayist
- Svetlana Vinogradova (born 1987), Russian snowboarder
- Svetlana Vukajlović, Serbian lawyer
- Svetlana Vysokova (born 1972), Russian speed skater
- Svetlana Yanushkevich, Belarusian-Canadian electrical engineer
- Svetlana Zaginaichenko (1957–2015), Ukrainian solid state physicist
- Svetlana Zainetdinova (born 1962), Soviet-Estonian chess player and coach
- Svetlana Zakharova, several people
- Svetlana Zalevskaya (born 1974), Kazakhstani high jumper
- Svetlana Zelenkovskaya (born 1977), Belarusian actress
- Svetlana Zhidko (born 1980), Belarusian swimmer
- Svetlana Zhiltsova (1936–2026), Soviet television presenter
- Svetlana Zhurova (born 1972), Russian speed skater
- Svetlana Zilberman (born 1958), Israeli badminton player and coach
- Svetlana Žuchová (born 1976), Slovak writer and translator
- Svetlana Zylin (1948–2002), Belgian-born Canadian theatre director and playwright

== See also ==
- Leora, equivalent Hebrew name
- Keiko, equivalent Japanese name
