= Svitlana =

Svitlana (Ukrainian: Світлана) is a Ukrainian language female given name and may refer to:

- Svitlana Akhadova (born 1993), Ukrainian canoeist
- Svitlana Azarova (born 1976), Ukrainian/Dutch composer of contemporary classical music
- Svitlana Bevza, Ukrainian fashion designer
- Svitlana Biedarieva, Ukrainian art historian, artist, and curator
- Svitlana Bilyayeva (born 1946), archaeologist specialising in Ukraine, the Golden Horde and the Ottoman Empire
- Svitlana Bondarenko (born 1971), former international breaststroke swimmer from Ukraine
- Svitlana Chernikova (born 1977), Ukrainian former competitive ice dancer
- Svitlana Demchenko (born 2003), Canadian chess player
- Svitlana Fabrykant (born 1967), Ukrainian politician
- Svitlana Fil (born 1969), Soviet rower
- Svitlana Fomenko (born 1976), Ukrainian civil servant and politician
- Svitlana Frishko, Ukrainian football striker
- Svitlana Gorbenko, Paralympian athlete from Ukraine
- Svitlana Halyuk (born 1987), Ukrainian professional racing cyclist
- Svitlana Hrynchuk (born 1985), Ukrainian politician
- Svitlana Iaromka (born 1989), Ukrainian judoka
- Svitlana Kashchenko (born 1968), Russian-born Nicaraguan sport shooter
- Svitlana Konstantynova (born 1975), Ukrainian speed skater
- Svitlana Kopchykova (born 1967), Ukrainian swimmer
- Svitlana Krakovska, Ukrainian climate scientist
- Svitlana Kryukova (born 1984), Ukrainian journalist
- Svitlana Kryvoruchko (born 1975), Ukrainian journalist, CEO in BTB and Kyiv TV channels
- Svitlana Kudelya (born 1992), Paralympian athlete from Ukraine
- Svitlana Kyrychenko (1935–2016), Ukrainian human rights activist
- Svitlana Loboda (born 1982), Ukrainian singer and composer
- Svitlana Malkova (born 1990), Ukrainian trampoline gymnast, member of the national team
- Svitlana Mamyeyeva (born 1982), Ukrainian triple jumper
- Svitlana Mankova (born 1962), Ukrainian former handball player
- Svitlana Matevusheva (born 1981), Ukrainian sailor
- Svitlana Matviyenko (born 1976), Ukrainian media theorist and researcher
- Svitlana Mayboroda (born 1981), Ukrainian professor of mathematics at the University of Minnesota
- Svitlana Maziy (born 1968), retired rower and twice Olympic medallist from Ukraine
- Svitlana Nianio, Ukrainian singer and songwriter
- Svitlana Okley (born 1969), Ukrainian murderer
- Svitlana Oleksiivna Shvachko (born 1935), Professor of Germanic Philology in Sumy State University
- Svitlana Onyshchuk (born 1984), Ukrainian politician
- Svitlana Prokopova (born 1993), Ukrainian group rhythmic gymnast
- Svitlana Prystav, Ukrainian former pair skater
- Svitlana Pyrkalo (born 1976), London-based Ukrainian writer, journalist and translator
- Svitlana Samuliak (born 2003), Ukrainian weightlifter
- Svitlana Semchouk (born 1984), track and road cyclist from Ukraine
- Svitlana Serbina (born 1980), Ukrainian Olympic diver
- Svitlana Shatalova (born 1983), Ukrainian political figure, deputy Governor of Odesa Oblast
- Svitlana Shmidt (born 1990), Ukrainian middle-distance runner
- Svitlana Spiriukhova (born 1982), Ukrainian rower
- Svitlana Stanko-Klymenko (born 1976), Ukrainian long-distance runner
- Svitlana Stetsiuk (born 1974), Ukrainian athlete
- Svitlana Tarabarova (born 1990), Ukrainian singer, songwriter, music producer, and actress
- Svitlana Yeremenko (born 1959), Ukrainian journalist, writer, NGO manager
- Svitlana Zakharova (born 1987), Ukrainian singer-songwriter
- Svitlana Zalishchuk (born 1982), politician, human rights campaigner, former member of Ukrainian Parliament
- Svitlana Zelepukina (born 1980), Ukrainian gymnast

== See also ==
- Svetlana (Cyrillic: Светлана), a Slavic female given name
- Svetlina (disambiguation), several villages in Bulgaria
- Sviatlana (Belarusian: Святлана), a Belarusian female given name
