= Svetlana (disambiguation) =

Svetlana is a Slavic female given name.

Svetlana may also refer to:

- Russian ship Svetlana, three Imperial Russian Navy ships
- Svetlana-class cruiser, the only light cruiser class of the Imperial Russian Navy
- Svetlana (TV series), a HDNet comedy series that premiered in 2010
- Svetlana (ballad), an 1813 ballad by Vasily Zhukovsky
- Svetlana (company), a company based in Saint Petersburg, Russia

== See also ==
- Svetlina (disambiguation)
