= Yaar Gaddar =

- DVD Cover
- Directed by: Umesh Mehra
- Written by: M. Mishra
- Produced by: Parvesh Mehra
- Starring: Mithun Chakraborty; Saif Ali Khan; Somy Ali; Shweta; Prem Chopra; Gulshan Grover
- Cinematography: S.Pappu
- Music by: Anu Malik
- Production company: Eagle Films
- Release date: 4 November 1994
- Running time: 154 minutes
- Language: Hindi

Yaar Gaddar (transl. Treacherous friend) is a 1994 Indian Hindi-language action thriller film directed by Umesh Mehra, starring Mithun Chakraborty, Saif Ali Khan, Somy Ali, Shweta in the lead roles.

== Plot ==
Inspector Shankar (Mithun Chakraborty) is an honest police officer of the department and he is in love with Shashi (Somy Ali). Even though he is a strict person to the outside world, he is lenient with his younger brother Jai (Saif Ali Khan) at home. Jai is a "happy go lucky" guy who falls in love with Neeru (Shweta). Meantime, a group of five criminals: Raghunath, Raghuvansh, Mushtaque, Vishwas and Sheela plots a bank robbery and Jai is implicated in the robbery, putting him on the run from the police. Officially, Shankar is assigned the task of arresting Jai at any cost and he makes all efforts to nab Jai, but fails. Another important character is the Bank Chairman, the husband of Sheela. The situation becomes even worse when the members of the group are killed one by one. Shankar is now determined to catch Jai dead or alive. Meanwhile, Shankar also reveals that his girlfriend Shashi is a bar dancer who works in the bar owned by the same criminals. On the other hand, Jai also tries to collect evidence to prove his innocence to his brother, but gets into a bigger problem as Shashi sees him coming out of the house of the criminal who was killed.

== Cast ==
- Mithun Chakraborty as Inspector Shankar Verma
- Saif Ali Khan as Jai Verma
- Somy Ali as Shashi
- Shweta as Neeru
- Prem Chopra as Raghunath Singh
- Gulshan Grover as Retired General Raghuvansh
- Puneet Issar as Retired Commander Mushtaque
- Amrit Pal as Retired Colonel Vishwas
- Umesh Shukla as Bank Chairman Jagdish Khanna / Sheela
- Johny Lever as Inspector Santram
- Himani Shivpuri as Inspector Pushpa
- Anjana Mumtaz as Mrs. Verma
- Shubha Khote as Shashi's Mother
- Yunus Parvez as Moolchand
- Razak Khan as Swami Abhutanand Baba
- Javed Khan Amrohi as Bheem Singh

== Soundtrack ==
Yaar Gaddar

Soundtrack album by Anu Malik
- Released: 1994
- Genre: Feature film soundtrack
- Length: 29 Min 17Sec
- Language: Hindi
- Label: Weston Components
- Producer: Parvesh Mehra

The music of the film was composed by Anu Malik and the lyrics were penned by Qateel Shifai, Pooja Ahuja and Dev Kohli . The soundtrack was released in 1994 on Audio Cassette in Weston Components Music, which consists of 6 songs. The full album is recorded by Kumar Sanu, Alka Yagnik and Udit Narayan.

#	Title	Singer(s)	Lyricist(s)
1	"Mere Samne Hai"	Kumar Sanu, Alka Yagnik	Qateel Shifai
2	"Tum Hi Tum"	Kumar Sanu, Alka Yagnik	Puja Ahuja and Dev Kohli
3	"Mera Yaar Aa Gaya Hai"	Alka Yagnik	Qateel Shifai
4	"Mere Dil Mein"	Udit Narayan, Alka Yagnik	Pooja Ahuja
5	"Tum Jaoge Jab"	Udit Narayan	Pooja Ahuja
6	"Rat Song"	Udit Narayan	Dev Kohli
