= Yanushkevich =

Yanushkevich is a Slavic surname. Notable people with the surname include:

- Alyaksey Yanushkevich (born 1986), Belarusian footballer
- Nikolai Yanushkevich (1868–1918), Russian general
- Svetlana Yanushkevich, Belarusian-Canadian electrial engineer
