= Alexander Voeykov =

Russian poet, translator, literary historian and journalist

Alexander Fyodorovich Voeykov
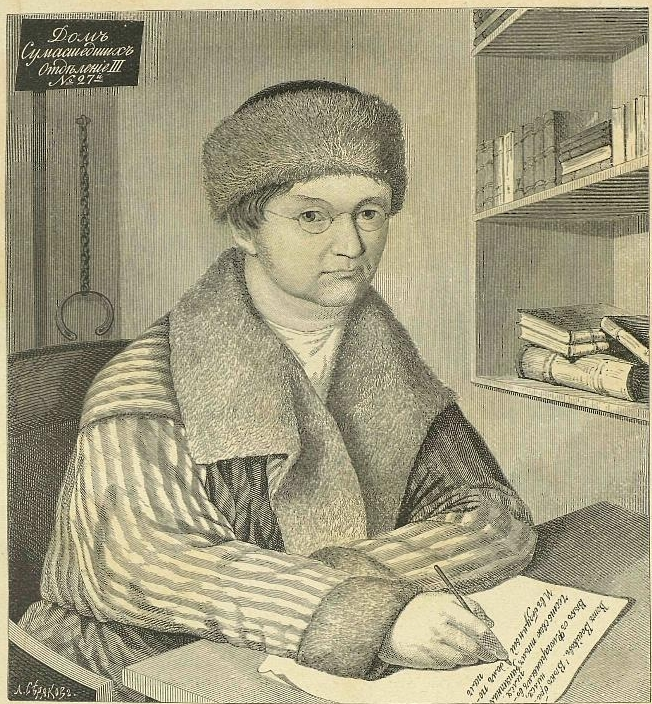
- Born: September 10 [O.S. August 30] 1779; Moscow
- Died: July 28 [O.S. July 16] 1839; Saint Petersburg
- Occupation: Poet • translator • journalist • satirist
- Spouse: Aleksandra Andreevna Voeikova
- Writing career
- Notable work: The Asylum (1814)

Alexander Fyodorovich Voeykov (Алекса′ндр Фё′дорович Вое′йков, September 10 (August 30, o.s) 1779, Moscow, Russian Empire - July 28 (16) 1839, Saint Petersburg, Russian Empire) was a Russian poet, translator, literary historian and journalist, best known for his satirical poems of 1814-1820.

== Biography ==
Alexander Voeykov was born in Moscow into a noble family and studied at the Moscow University's boarding school for nobility where his name later has been engraved onto the golden plaque of the best students in the history of the school. In 1796 he joined the Russian army and served in cavalry guards.

After retirement in 1801 he returned to Moscow and made his house a literary center, home to the circle known as Friendly Literature Society which had among its members Vasily Zhukovsky, brothers Andrey and Alexander Turgenev, Aleksey Merzlyakov, brothers Andrey and Mikhail Kaisarov, Semyon Rodzyanko. Voeykov's political views were radical for his times: he was denouncing 'tyranny', criticized Zhukovsky's neutrality in political issues and was the proponent of the 'social poetry'. Two of his best known early works were satires, "To Speransky: On Real Welfare" and "To My Starosta", published in 1806 and 1807 respectively. In 1909 his translations of Voltaire's The Age of Louis XIV and The Age of Louis XV were published.

In 1812-1813, Voeykov served in the Russian army. He became an active member of the literary circle which formed around Andrey Kaisarov's printing office at the Mikhail Kutuzov's headquarters. Inspired by Russian victory over Napoleon, he published several patriotic verses in 1813. In 1814, Voeykov married Alexandra Andreyevna Protasova, a niece of Zhukovsky who served as a prototype for his famous Svetlana ballad's heroine. The satirical pamphlet The Asylum (Дом сумесшедших, 1814), ridiculing prominent authors and politicians, gave him notoriety; it was first published only in 1857, almost twenty years after its author's death.

In 1815, Voeykov moved with his family to Dorpat to become the professor of Russian language at this city's University. In the years to follow he drifted towards the Karamzin circle and took part in the Arzamas Society. In 1817 his translation of Virgil's Georgics was published. The same year Voeykov and Alexander Turgenev published the first in the series of Selected Works from Russian Literature which was re-issued in 1822-1824.

After quitting the Dorpat University, Voeykov in 1820 moved to Saint Petersburg to become an inspector in an artillery college. The same year he was elected the Member of the Russian Academy of Science and started a journalistic career. In 1820, recommended by Zhukovsky, he became a co-publisher of Syn Otechestva magazine but a raw with Nikolay Gretsch put an end to this. In 1822-1828 he edited Russky Invalid newspaper, then in 1827-1830, Slavyanin magazine, maintaining strong professional links with Alexander Pushkin, Kondraty Ryleyev, Anton Delvig and Pyotr Vyazemsky, among others. Still, Voeykov was not a popular figure: his satires were harsh, some colleagues considered him to be mercantile and quarrelsome.

In 1828, Voeykov's wife died. He lost the support of many prominent people and in his later years experienced serious financial troubles. He was making attempts to compile and publish his works but never succeeded. Alexander Voeykov died in 1839 in Saint Petersburg.
