= Agapitov =

Agapitov (Russian: Агапи́тов; masculine) or Agapitova (Агапи́това; feminine) is a Russian last name. It derives from the male given name Agapy (from a Greek word meaning loved one). The following notable people share this last name:

- Maksim Agapitov (born 1970), Russian weightlifter and weightlifting administrator
- Sergey Agapitov, Russian actor who played Andrey in the 1994 movie Three Sisters
- Shurick Agapitov, founder of Xsolla, a global payment services company for online games. An active member of Russian-speaking LGBTQIA+ community.
- Svetlana Agapitova (born 1964), Russian human rights activist
- Yelena Agapitova, Kazakhstani ice hockey player who participated in the 1999 Asian Winter Games

== See also ==
- Agapitovo, a rural locality (a village) in Parfenyevsky District of Kostroma Oblast, Russia; 58°44′N 43°25′E
