= Shweta =

Shwetha
- Gender: female

Origin
- Meaning: white
- Region of origin: India

Other names
- Related names: Shveta, Suvetha, Sweta, Sweth, Swetha, Seta, Shwetha, Shiveta

Shweta (Devanagari: श्वेता) is an Indian Hindu feminine given name. The Sanskrit word श्वेता śvetā literally means "white". The Hindu goddess of knowledge Saraswati is also known as "Shwetambara".

== Notable people ==
=== Shweta ===
- Shweta Bhardwaj (born 1985), Indian actress and model
- Shweta Chaudhary (born 1986), Indian shooter
- Shweta Gulati (born 1979), Indian television actress
- Shweta Kawatra (born 1976), Indian actress
- Shweta Menon (born 1974), Indian actress and model
- Shweta Mohan (born 1986), Indian singer
- Shweta Munshi, Indian television actress
- Shweta Pandit (born 1986), Indian singer
- Shweta Prasad (born 1991), Indian film actress
- Shweta Rathore (born 1988), Indian bodybuilder
- Shweta Salve, Indian television actress and model
- Shweta Sekhon (born 1997), Malaysian model and beauty pageant titleholder
- Shweta Shetty (born 1969), Indian singer
- Shweta Subram, Indo-Canadian Bollywood playback singer
- Shweta Taneja, Indian novelist, graphic novelist and journalist
- Shweta Tiwari, Indian film and television actress

=== Shwetha ===
- Shwetha Bandekar, actress in Tamil and Telugu cinema
- Shwetha Chengappa, actress in Kannada cinema
- P. Shwetha, actress in Tamil cinema
- Shwetha Srivatsav, actress in Kannada cinema

== See also ==
- Oxyopes shweta, a species of lynx spider
- Sweta, a genus of leafhopper in the subfamily Typhlocybinae
- Svetlana, a Slavic cognate
- Svitlana
