= Kuritsyn =

Kuritsyn (Russian: Курицын, from курица meaning chicken) is a Russian masculine surname, its feminine counterpart is Kuritsyna. It may refer to

- Fyodor Kuritsyn, Russian statesman, philosopher and a poet
- Svetlana Kuritsyna, Russian journalist
