= Alexandra Andreevna Voeikova =

Wife of poet Alexander Voiekov

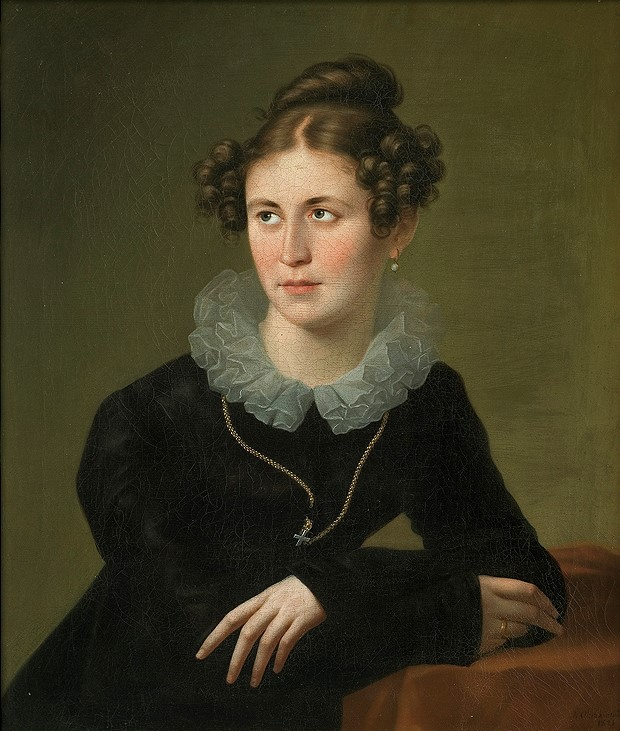
- Born: 20 August 1795
- Died: 16 February 1829 (aged 33); Pisa, Tuscany, Italy
- Spouse: Alexander Voeykov
- Issue: Ekaterina; Alexandra; Andrey; Maria
- Father: Andrey Ivanovich Protasov
- Mother: Ekaterina Afanasyevna Bunina

Alexandra Andreevna Voeikova (née Protasova; August 20, 1795 - February 16, 1829) was the niece and goddaughter of Vasily Zhukovsky, addressee of his ballad "Svetlana", and muse of the poet Nikolay Yazykov.

== Early life ==
Alexandra Andreevna Protasova was born into the family of the landowner Andrei Ivanovich Protasov and his wife Ekaterina Afanasyevna, née Bunina. Her father rose to the rank of lieutenant colonel; after his resignation he became the provincial leader of the Tula Oblast, while her mother devoted herself to raising her daughters. The family lived modestly, and after the death of their father in 1805. When his wife had to pay off creditors, she found herself in a dire situation altogether. The Protasovs settled in Belyov, where they lived until the summer of 1810. They lived with their mother's half-brother, Vasily Zhukovsky. Vasily read, wrote poetry and translated a lot, and gave language lessons to the young Alexandra and her older sister Maria (1793-1823). Zhukovsky's curriculum included a variety of subjects, including philosophy, morality, history, geography, aesthetics, and literature. Under the leadership of Zhukovsky, Derzhavin's poems, works by Schiller, Goethe, Shakespeare, Racine, Corneille, Voltaire, and Rousseau were analyzed, as well as works of ancient literature - satire by Juvenal and the odes of Horace. They read the works of Bürger in the original. In 1810, after the construction of a house in Muratov (Oryol Governorate) was completed, the Protasovs moved there; Zhukovsky settled in the neighboring village of Kholkh.

== Marriage and children ==
In November 1813, at the invitation of Zhukovsky, his friend Alexander Voeykov (1779-1839) arrived in Muratovo. Despite his outward unattractiveness, Voeikov made an impression on Ekaterina Afanasyevna and especially on Alexandra Andreevna. A participant in the Patriotic War, he told fascinating stories and had a mocking mindset. Seeing the lovely 18-year-old Alexandra whom Vigel compared with Sylphide and Undine, the writer (he was already thirty-five by this time), wooed her. Zhukovsky also supported this marriage. Long in love with Maria Protasova, the poet hoped for Voeikov's help in receiving blessings from the girls' mother. Alexandra's older sister also persuaded her to marry Voeikov.

The wedding took place on July 14, 1814, in the Podzavalovskaya church. To provide his niece with a dowry, Zhukovsky sold his village. On the occasion of the wedding, Zhukovsky gave her the ballad "Svetlana". He also sought a professorial position for Voeikov at the University of Tartu. The newlyweds left with Ekaterina Afanasyevna and Maria for Tartu.

Alexandra's married life turned out to be very unhappy. Soon after the wedding, Voeikov made life unbearable not only for his wife, but also for his mother-in-law and sister-in-law. Ekaterina Afanasyevna wrote to her relative Avdotya Kireevskaya in 1816:

"You know my true affection for Voeikov, you saw my treatment of him, my tender solicitude to hide his shortcomings in front of others, I definitely thought of him as a son, as you are of Vanichka. What am I locked up with? hate, yes! precisely, in all the power of the word; he not only says that he hates me, no, he cannot see me calmly. And he is Sasha's husband, Dunyasha; What does she endure?"

Nikolai Grech noted in his memoirs:

"He owed his entire existence to his incomparable wife, beautiful, intelligent, educated and kind Alexandra Andreevna, who was his martyr, who became a victim of this vile monster."

Zhukovsky's hopes for Voeikov's intercession did not come true either. Trying to earn the favor of Ekaterina Afanasyevna, he completely went over to her side. In addition, Maria was subjected to ridicule and bullying in his house. In her diary, she wrote in November 1815:

"I made up my mind to run away from home somewhere. Perhaps Voeikov will take pity on the misfortune of mother and Sasha - having lost me, they will be unhappy. We went on visits; at this time Voeikov promised mamaenka to kill Moyer, Zhukovsky, and then stab himself to death. After supper he was drunk again. Mom's vomiting is violent, and my throat is constantly bleeding. Voeikov laughs at me, saying that the reason for this is passion, that I also spat blood when I gathered for Zhukovsky."

In 1817, Maria Protasova married a professor at the University of Dorpat named Johann Moyer and moved with her mother to her husband's house.

Alexandra and Alexander had the following children:

- Ekaterina (1815-1844) - Zhukovsky's goddaughter; died suddenly in Moscow, “she got some kind of severe rash, her blood went into complete decomposition, and in three days her young life dried up and disappeared”.
- Alexandra (1817-1893) - in 1835 she graduated from the Catherine Institute with a large gold code; the maid of honor of the Grand Duchess Maria Nikolaevna;
- Andrew (1822-1866);
- Maria (1826-1906) - wife of Pontus Brevern-de la Gardie, Lady-in-waiting to Grand Duchess Alexandra Iosifovna.

After the death of Alexandra, the children were in the care of her friends: Zhukovsky, Perovsky, and Seidlitz. Voeikov did not take part in their later upbringing.

== Literary Salon ==
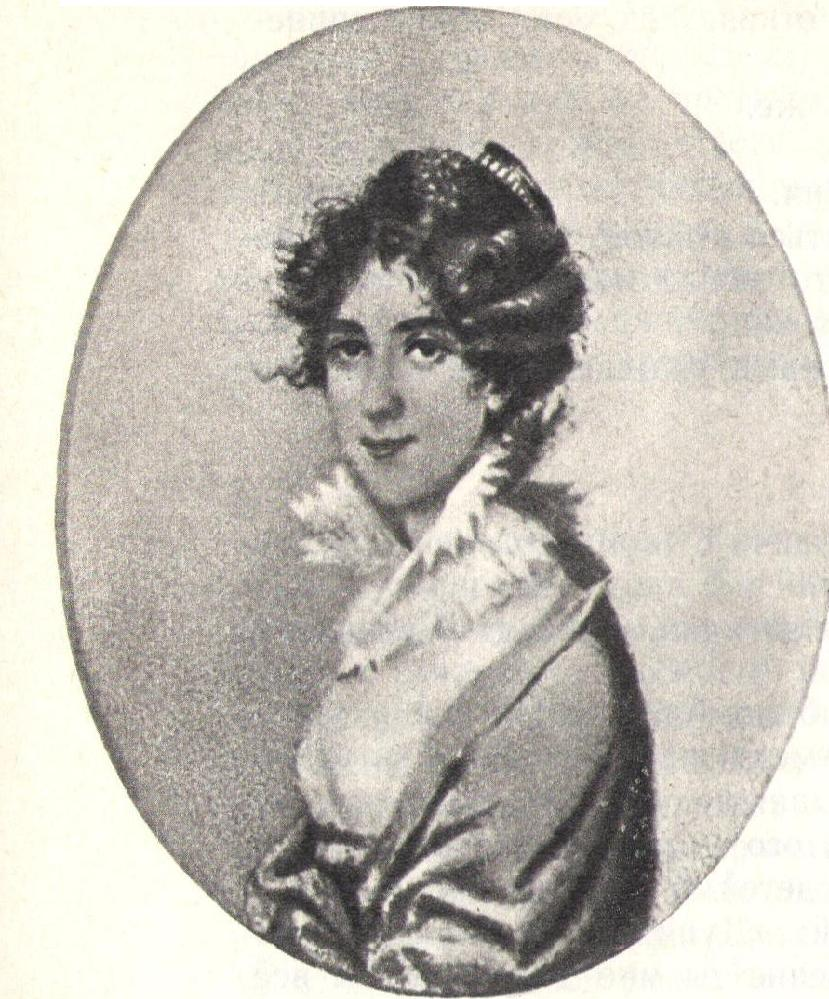
Alexandra in the 1820s

In 1820 the Voeikovs moved to St. Petersburg. On the recommendation of Zhukovsky, Grech agreed to co-edit Voeikov in the journal "Son of the Fatherland", entrusting him with the department of criticism and review of magazines. Voeikov also got a job as a teacher of Russian literature and class inspector at the St. Petersburg artillery school. Alexander Turgenev appointed him to the position of an official for special assignments in the Department of Spiritual Affairs.

Zhukovsky invited the Voeikovs to live together; life together was, in his words, "a sacrifice to cute Sandrochk." The Voeikov-Zhukovsky's apartment on Nevsky Prospect soon became the center of literary and artistic life of St. Petersburg in the 1820s. Highly educated and lively, Alexandra was not only a connoisseur of poetry, but she herself had talent. She took part in the processing of translations and articles in the newspaper "Russky Invalid", where her husband was the editor. On her initiative, Voeikov began publishing "Literary Supplements to the Russian Invalid." In Voeikova's living room, "the entire literary color of the capital" gathered. Attracted by the mind and charm of Alexandra, the poets dedicated poems to her. Ivan Kozlov considered her his muse, she was praised by Yevgeny Baratynsky and N. M. Yazykov. The perfection of Alexandra Andreevna attracted the hearts of many artists and poets. Voeikova collected an extensive library in various languages (she was fluent in French and German).

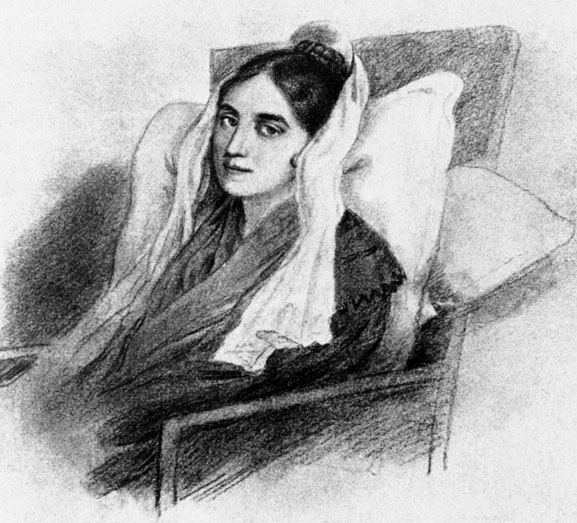
The last drawing of Alexandra before her death.

== Death ==
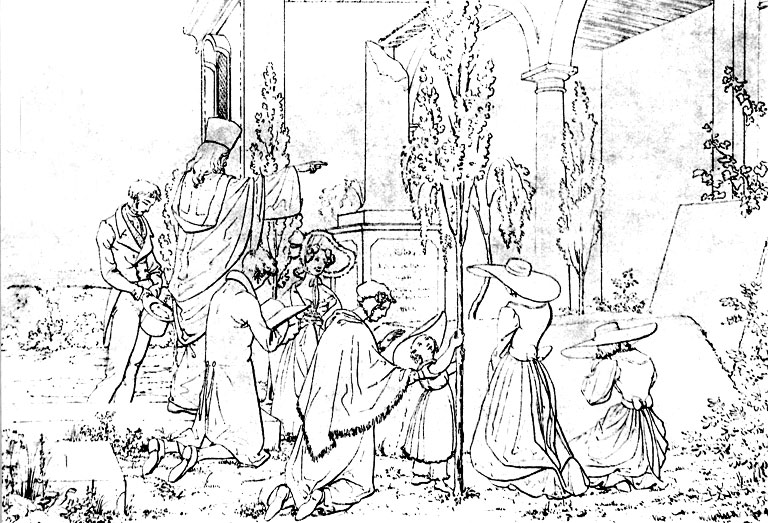
The funeral of A.A. Voeikova at the Greek cemetery in Livorno. Ink drawing by L. Maidel. 1830s

In the fall of 1827, at the expense of Zhukovsky, Voeikova left for treatment abroad. Sensing her imminent death, she wrote:

There is currently no place where I would feel good other than my sister's grave! There is my future, which I am not afraid of.

Only Lieutenant-General Vasily Perovsky accompanied her, unrequitedly in love with her for many years.

Alexandra Andreevna Voeikova died on February 16, 1829, from consumption in Pisa (according to other sources, in Nice). She was buried in the Greek Orthodox cemetery in Livorno. K. Seydlitz was responsible for the funeral. He ordered a cross with a crucifix and a slab of white marble with the same words from the Gospel of John (XIV, 1–4) “Let your heart not be confused; believe in God and believe in Me”, as was at the grave of her sister Maria in Dorpat. Zhukovsky frequented his niece's grave as he was in Italy often.
