= Sergio Benvenuto =

Italian psychoanalyst

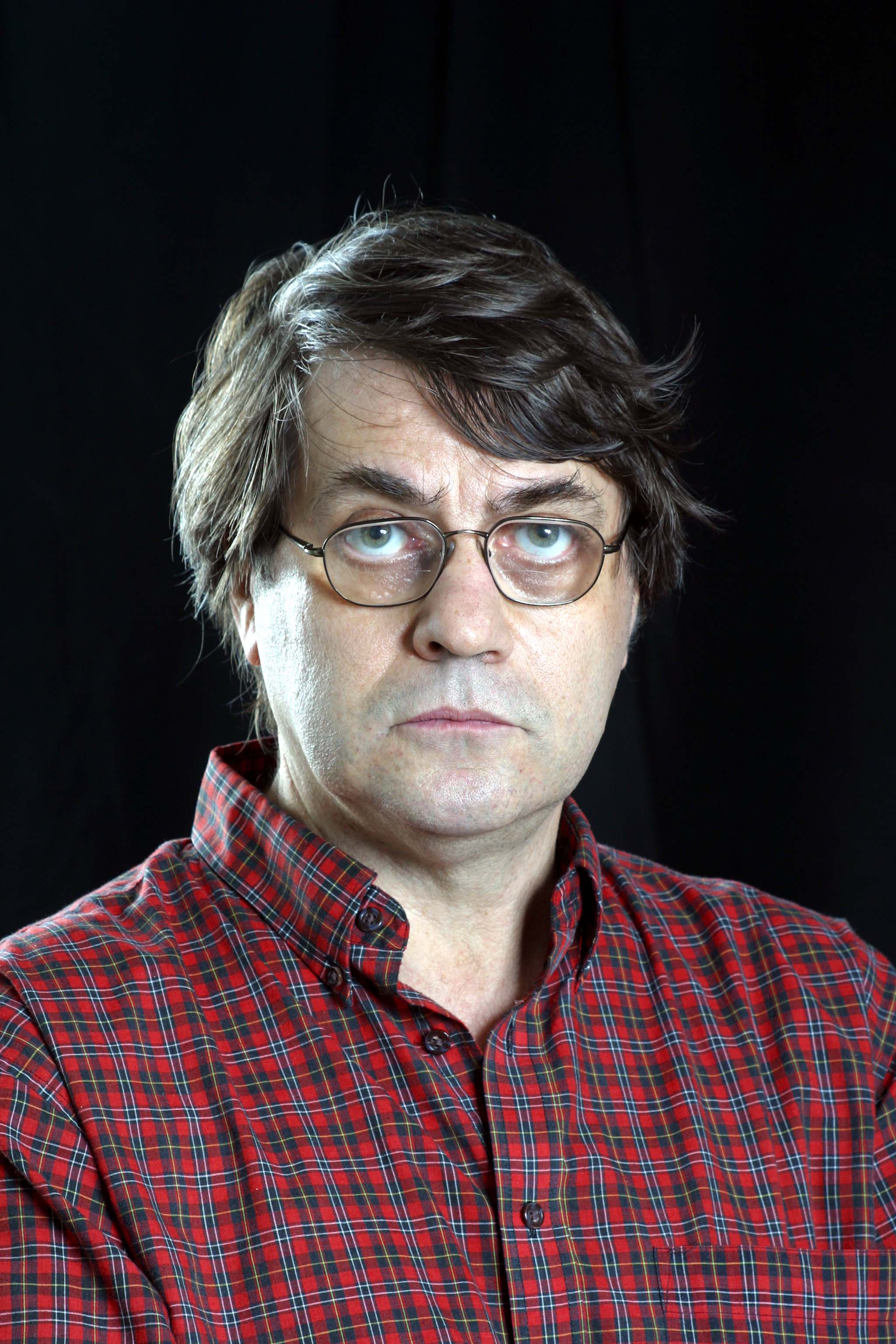
Sergio Benvenuto

Sergio Benvenuto (born 1948 in Naples, Italy) is an Italian psychoanalyst, philosopher and author. He is researcher for the Institute of Cognitive Sciences and Technologies (ISTC) of the Italian National Research Council (CNR) in Rome. He is Professor Emeritus in Psychoanalysis at the International Institute of Depth Psychology in Kyiv. He founded and edited the European Journal of Psychoanalysis (since 2012 also published in Russian).

== Biography ==
He studied at the University of Paris 7 between 1967 and 1973, where he obtained a Maîtrise (master's degree) in Psychology. In the same period he followed seminars by Roland Barthes (at the École Pratique des Hautes Etudes) and Jacques Lacan. He obtained his second degree in Sociology (in 1976) at the University of Urbino (Italy) and trained in psychoanalysis with analysts Elvio Fachinelli and Diego Napolitani in Milan, where he lived and worked between 1974 and 1979. He was Visiting Researcher at the Philosophy Department of the New School for Social Research (1989-1991). Since moving from Milan to Rome he has divided his work activities between research in Social Psychology with CNR, his private practice as analyst and his writing, both as author of papers and as journalist publishing in newspapers and magazines. In 1984, he co-founded the cultural magazine Lettre Internationale (which comes out with editions in German, Italian, Spanish and several other languages). He also contributes to American Imago and to Journal of American Psychoanalytic Association, and to various international magazines (such as the French L’Evolution psychiatrique and Cliniques Méditerranéennes, the German Texte, the Russian Psykoanalyz). In 1995 he founded in New York the semestral Journal of European Psychoanalysis, later EJPsy - European Journal of Psychoanalysis, which he edited until 2020 (www.journal-psychoanalysis.eu). Since 2011 he teaches Psychoanalysis at Kyiv's International Institute of Depth Psychology and the Esculapio, post-University school for Psychotherapists in Naples (Italy).

== Thought ==
Benvenuto has addressed fields apparently very different from one another – social psychology, philosophy of language, political philosophy, psychoanalysis, political theory – in the nineties he began to structure a predominant project that touches upon all these fields: to replace the primacy of reflection on Truth (typical of Western culture) with a reflection that aims at the Real. In this way he seeks a third way between the two predominant and opposing Western cultures: positivist epistemology (concerned with the truth conditions of propositions) on the one hand, and hermeneutics (concerned with disclosing a Truth that unravels throughout human history) on the other. He adopts the concept of Real from Jacques Lacan, but broadens its meaning, including in it everything that remains external (origin and remainder) to every structure of sense, whether scientific, aesthetic, ethical and political. The Real is the background upon which every scientific theory, every artistic production, the psychoanalysis of each subject, every ethic arrangement, revolves and it is always in excess of all these “discourses”. Thus, the Real of every scientific theory is the Chaos that sets itself as the limit and background of every causative process. The Real in psychoanalysis is the background to the drives, the bodily, irreducibly individual background before which all interpretation stops. In particular (for example in La strategia freudiana [The Freudian Strategy] and in Perversionen [Perversions]) he has engaged in an original reinterpretation of Freudian theory and of psychoanalysis in general, as founded on a precise metaphysics of “the signifying flesh”. Freud's interpretative and explicative tissue, however, also refers to something uninterpretable and inexplicable: the drive as an opaque non-signifying source of subjectivity.

== English Language Publications ==
- “The Son's Room” or: Analysis is Over”, Journal of European Psychoanalysis, n. 12-13, 2001, pp. 163–172.
- “Psychoanalysis and Mimetic Theory: Difference and Identity. A Conversation of Sergio Benvenuto with René Girard”, Journal of European Psychoanalysis, 14, Winter-Spring 2002, pp. 3–25.
- “Freud and Masochism”, Journal of European Psychoanalysis, 16, Winter-Spring 2003, pp. 57–80.
- “On Perversions”, Journal for Lacanian Studies, vol. 1, n. 2, 2003, pp. 243–260.
- “Perversion and charity: an ethical approach”, in Dany Nobus and Lisa Downing, Perversion. Psychoanalytic Perspectives / Perspectives on Psychoanalysis, Karnac, London 2006, pp. 59–78.
- “Dora flees…”, Journal of European Psychoanalysis, 21, 2005/2, pp. 3–31.
- “Simplistic Complexity: A Discussion on Psychoanalysis and Chaos Theory”, World Futures, vol. 61, n. 3, 2005, pp. 181–187.
- “Anatomical Women”, Journal of European Psychoanalysis, 22, 1/2006, pp. 117–122.
- “Wittgenstein and Lacan Reading Freud”, Journal for Lacanian Studies, vol. 4, nr. 1, 2006, pp. 99–120.
- “Resistances”, Jean-François Lyotard, A conversation with Sergio Benvenuto, Journal of European Psychoanalysis, 24, 2007-1,
- With Anthony Molino, In Freud's Tracks. Conversations from the Journal of European Psychoanalysis, Washington, USA, Aronson, 2008.
- “Introduction to the Italian Edition of Daly & Žižek, A Conversation with Žižek”, JEP. European Journal of Psychoanalysis, IPOC, 26-27, 2008 I-II, pp. 67–97. ISSN 2038-5196
- “Sublimation and compassion”, JEP. European Journal of Psychoanalysis, 29, 2009/2, pp. 49–76. ISSN 2038-5196
- “Perversions Today” JEP. European Journal of Psychoanalysis, 30, 2010-I, pp. 27–40. ISSN 2038-5196
- “The Monsters Next Door”, American Imago. Psychoanalysis and Human Sciences, 69, Winter 2012, n. 4, pp. 435–448.
- “The Earth is Evil: On Lars Von Trier's Melancholia”, DIVISION/Review, A Quarterly Psychoanalytic Forum, 7, Spring 2012, pp. 41–43.
- “The Idiot's Tragedy”, Sara Fortuna & Laura Scuriatti eds., “On Dogville”, Dekalog 5, Columbia University Press, Wallflower (London-New York), 2012, pp. 22–37.
- “The Dandy Dentist (Review of : Elisabeth Roudinesco, Lacan, envers et contre tout, Paris, Seuil, 2011)”, DIVISION/Review, 5, summer 2012, pp. 4–7.
- “Happiness for Dismal Science”, The Candidate Connection. Newsletter, January 2012, vol. 14, issue 1, pp. 4–7,
- “Failing Democracies”, Magyar Lettre Internationale, 88, 2013, pp. 39–42.
- “Does Perversion Need the Law?”, edited by Wolfgang Müller-Funk, Ingrid Scholz-Strasser, Herman Westerink, Psychoanalysis, Monotheism and Morality. The Sigmund Freud Museum Symposia 2009-2011, Leuven, Leuven University Press, 2013, pp. 175–184.
- “Ethics, Wonder and Real in Wittgenstein”, in Ylva Gustafsson, Camilla Kronqvist, Hannes Nykänen, eds., Ethics and the Philosophy of Culture: Wittgensteinian Approaches, 2013, Cambridge Scholar Publishing, pp. 137–159.
- What are Perversions? Sexuality, Ethics, Psychoanalysis, 2016, Karnac, London.
- Conversations with Lacan. Seven Lectures for Understanding Lacan, 2020, Routledge, London.
- Contributor to Coronavirus, Psychoanalysis, and Philosophy Conversations on Pandemics, Politics and Society, edited By Fernando Castrillón & Thomas Marchevsky, 2021, Routledge, London, ISBN 9780367713669

== Main Works in Italian and Other Languages ==
- La strategia freudiana, Napoli, Liguori, 1984.
- Capire l'America, Genova, Costa & Nolan, 1995.
- Dicerie e pettegolezzi, Bologna, Il Mulino, 2000.
- Un cannibale alla nostra mensa. Gli argomenti del relativismo nell’epoca della globalizzazione, Bari, Dedalo, 2000.
- Perversioni. Sessualità, etica e psicoanalisi, Torino, Bollati Boringhieri, 2005.
- Mechta Lakana [in Russian], "Aleteija", Sankt-Peterburg, 2006.
- Accidia. La passione dell’indifferenza, Bologna, Il Mulino, 2008.
- Lo jettatore, Milano, Mimesis, 2011.
- La gelosia, Bologna, Il Mulino, 2011.
- Confini dell'interpretazione. Freud Feyerabend Foucault, Milano, IPOC, 2013.
- “Sono uno spettro, ma non lo so”, Milano, Mimesis, 2013.
- Wittgenstein. Lo stupore e il grido, Milano, et al., 2013. 2015
- La psicoanalisi e il reale.ORTHOTES,
- Leggere Freud. Dall'isteria alla fine dell'analisi, Salerno, Orthotes, 2028.
- Godere senza limiti. Un italiano nel maggio 68, Milano, Mimesis.
- La ballata del mangiatore di cervella. Kris, Lacan e l'eredità freudiana, Salerno, Orthotes, 2020.

== External Links in English ==
- Managing a Journal without a Soul http://www.journal-psychoanalysis.eu/category/ejp/managing-a-journal-without-a-soul/
- Conversation with André Green: On Lacan http://www.psychomedia.it/jep/number24/green.htm
- Conversation with René Girard: On Mimetic desire http://www.psychomedia.it/jep/number14/girard.htm
- Conversation with Francisco Varela: On consciousness http://www.psychomedia.it/jep/number14/varela.htm
- Conversation with Jean-Luc Nancy: On Derrida http://www.psychomedia.it/jep/number19/benvenuto.htm
- Conversation with Jean-François Lyotard : Resistances http://www.psychomedia.it/jep/number24/lyotard.htm
- Conversation with Julia Kristeva : On Proust http://www.journal-psychoanalysis.eu/il-tempo-e-lesperienza-letteraria-in-proust-una-conversazione-con-sergio-benvenuto/
- Conversation with Julia Kristeva: Freudian Models of Language http://www.psychomedia.it/jep/number3-4/kristeng.htm
- Eyes Wide Shut. Does Psychoanalysis have Contact with the Real? http://www.psychomedia.it/jep/number8-9/benvenuto.htm
- Freud's Concept of Narcissism http://www.psychomedia.it/jep/number1/benvenuto1.htm
- Dora flees… http://www.psychomedia.it/jep/number21/benvenuto_dora.pdf
- Anatomic Women http://www.journal-psychoanalysis.eu/anatomical-women-sergio-benvenuto/
- Freud and Masochism http://www.psychomedia.it/jep/number16/benvenuto1.htm
- On “Melancholia” by L. von Trier http://www.journal-psychoanalysis.eu/the-earth-is-evil-su-melancholia-di-lars-von-trier/
- Happiness for Dismal Science, The Candidate Connection, Newsletter, January 2012, vol. 14, issue 1, pp. 4–7
- Jealousy http://www.cespig.it/intervista-con-lautrice/
- End of Analysis http://www.psychomedia.it/isap/recenti/benvenuto-exit.htm
- Freuds Annäherung an Trauer und Melancholie - und danach [Freud's approach to mourning and melancholia] http://www.psychoanalyse-zuerich.ch/Einzelansicht.117+M50e09d1409a.0.htm
- The Drive towards the Real: Philosophy in the Epoch of Bio-Technologies and Bio-Politics https://web.archive.org/web/20090306082826/http://www.biopolitica.cl/docs/Benvenuto_THE_DRIVE_THE_REAL.pdf
- Hestia/Hermes http://mondodomani.org/dialegesthai/sb01.htm
- The Son's Room or: Analysis is Over http://www.psychomedia.it/jep/number12-13/benvenuto.htm
- Chaos and Cultural Fashions http://www.c3.hu/~eufuzetek/en/eng/15/index.php?mit=sergio
- Sergio Benvenuto and Cristiana Cimino, Psychoanalysis and Philosophy: A Conversation with Mario Perniola http://www.psychomedia.it/jep/number24/perniola.htm

== External Links in Other Languages ==
- Il significante, tra Saussure e Lacan. http://www.journal-psychoanalysis.eu/il-significante-tra-saussure-e-lacan/
- “Une superstition des Lumières à Naples : le jettatore”. http://www.cairn.info/revue-la-pensee-de-midi-2008-1-page-163.htm
- Il progetto della psichiatria fenomenologica. http://www.mondodomani.org/dialegesthai/sb03.htm
- Il gioco impari. A proposito dell’epistemologia lacaniana. http://www.sciacchitano.it/Infinito/Il%20gioco%20impari.pdf
