= Svetlana Zakharova =

Svetlana or Svitlana Zakharova may refer to:

- Svetlana Zakharova (athlete) (born 1970), Russian long-distance runner
- Svetlana Zakharova (dancer) (born 1979), Russian ballerina
- Svitlana Zakharova (singer) (born 1987), Ukrainian singer-songwriter
