= Alina Korobko =

Ukrainian opera singer (born 1947)

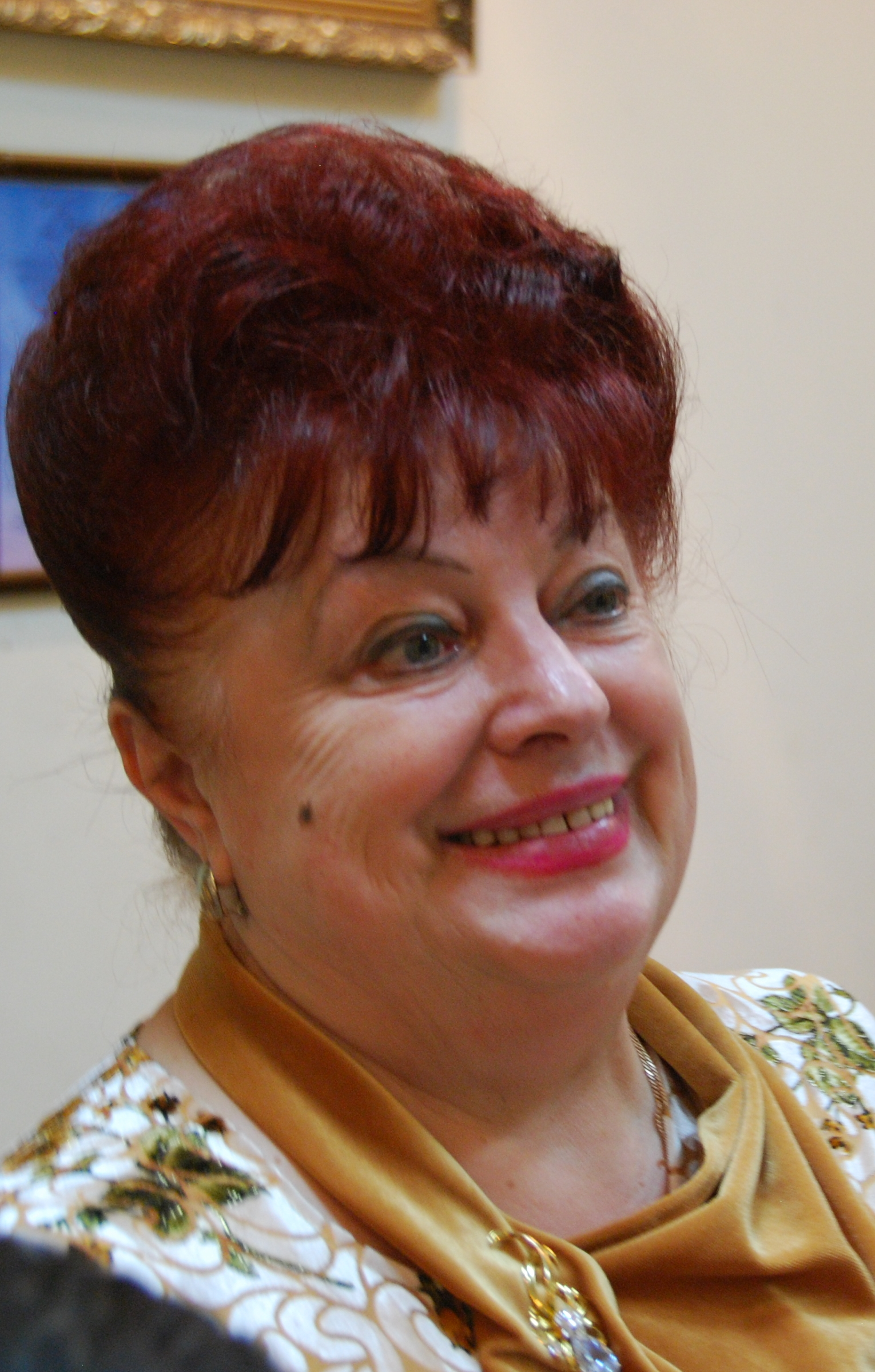

Alina Mykolayivna Korobko (Ukrainian: Аліна Миколаївна Коробко, born 11 November 1947 in Yerky) is a Ukrainian opera singer.

== Biography ==
Korobko graduated from the R. Glier Kyiv Institute of Music, after which in 1969 she came to enter theConservatory in Donetsk. Later she became a soloist of the Donetsk Symphony Orchestra.

Korobko's singing career began in 1972. With the joint performances with the ensemble of folk instruments "Surprise" (the head - Honored Artist of Ukraine Yury Kukuzenko) toured Europe. The most famous songs in her performance are "Autumn Gold", "Gandzia", "Under the Sky of Paris", and also "The City of My Love", dedicated to Donetsk by the authors of the Donetsk composer Serhiy Mamonov and the poet S. Zhukovsky. Performed with the chamber choir of the Donetsk Academy of Music under the direction of Alime Murzayeva and the concertmasters of Donetsk Philharmonic Stanislav Savari and Lyudmila Boroditskaya. She is one of the most well-known donachans; she is dubbed the "Donetsk Nightingale".

At present, Korobko, the head of the department, professor of the Donetsk Academy of Music named after S. Prokofiev. Among her students are soloists E. Udovin, G. Bratus, G. Kuklin, A. Yarov, A. Paretsky, E. Korzhevich and others.

Korobko is married to Eduard Zakharov. Their daughter, Svetlana Zakharova, is also a singer.
