= Sviatlana =

Sviatlana (Belarusian: Святлана) is a Belarusian female given name and may refer to:

- Sviatlana Khakhlova (born 1984), a Belarusian swimmer
- Sviatlana Kouhan (born 1980), a Belarusian long-distance runner
- Sviatlana Kudzelich (born 1987), a Belarusian long-distance runner
- Sviatlana Makshtarova (born 1994), a Belarusian-Azerbaijani individual and synchronised trampolinist
- Sviatlana Pirazhenka (born 1992), a Belarusian tennis player
- Sviatlana Sakhanenka (born 1989), a Belarusian Paralympic biathlete
- Sviatlana Siarova (born 1986), a Belarusian discus thrower
- Sviatlana Sudak Torun (born 1971), a Turkish hammer thrower of Belarusian origin
- Sviatlana Tsikhanouskaya (born 1982), a Belarusian presidential candidate
- Sviatlana Volnaya (born 1979), a Belarusian basketball player
- Sviatlana Vusovich (born 1980), a Belarusian sprinter

== See also ==
- Svitlana (Ukrainian: Світлана), a Ukrainian female given name
- Svetlana (Cyrillic: Светлана), a Slavic (Russian, ...) female given name
