= Turkmen State University =

University in Ashgabat, Turkmenistan

Magtymguly Turkmen State University
- Magtymguly adyndaky Türkmen döwlet uniwersiteti
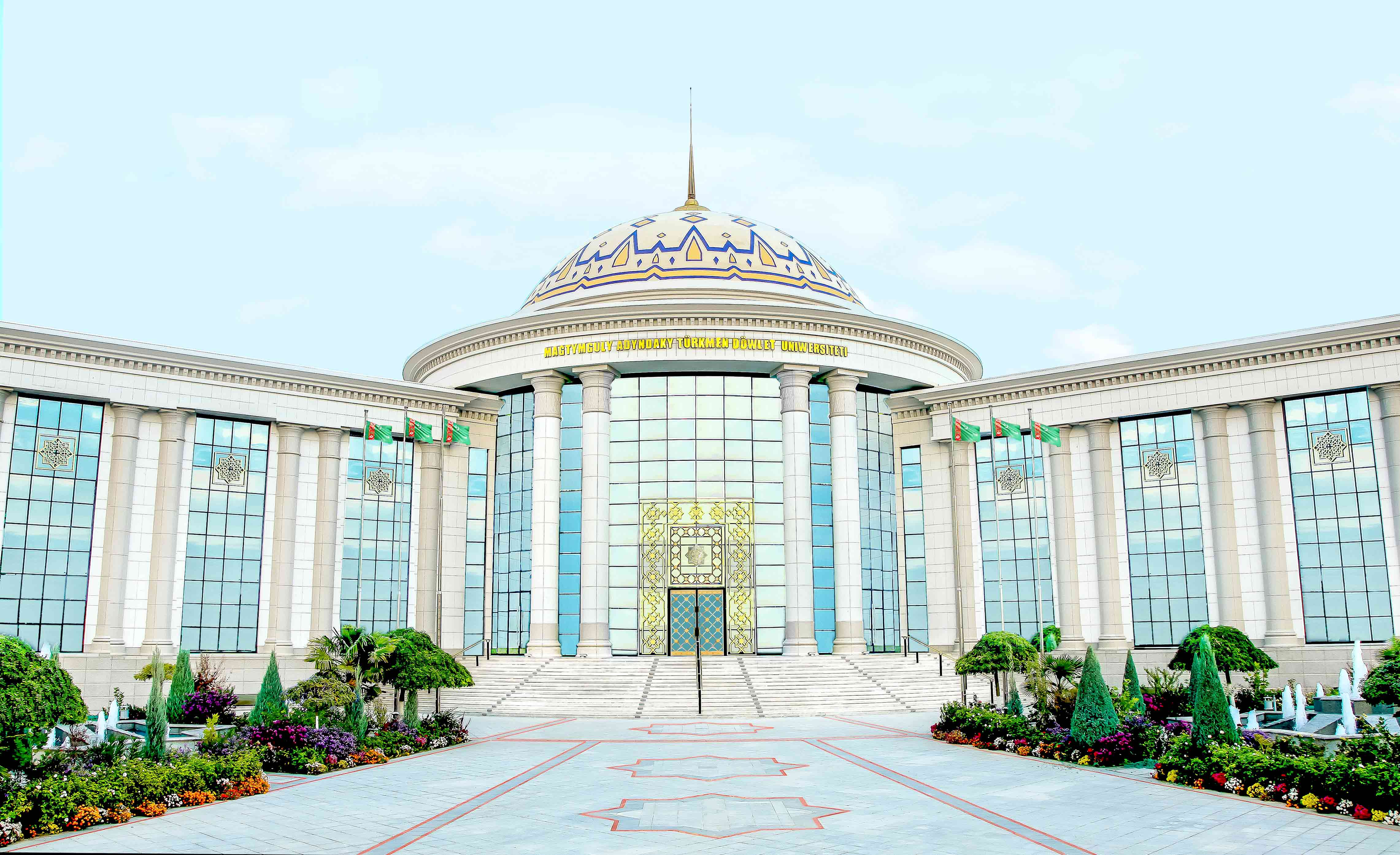
- Established: 1931
- Affiliations: Eurasian Association of Universities
- Rector: Orazgeldi Ovezsahedov
- Students: 8,041
- Location: Saparmurat Turkmenbashy Avenue 31; Ashgabat; Turkmenistan, Ashgabat, Turkmenistan; 37°55′51″N 58°23′14″E
- Campus: Urban
- Website: tdu.edu.tm

Magtymguly Turkmen State University (Turkmen: Magtymguly adyndaky Türkmen döwlet uniwersiteti) is one of the leading universities in Turkmenistan, located in the capital city Ashgabat. It is named after Magtymguly Pyragy, a Turkmen poet. Its current rector is Bayramgul Orazdurdyyeva.

== History ==
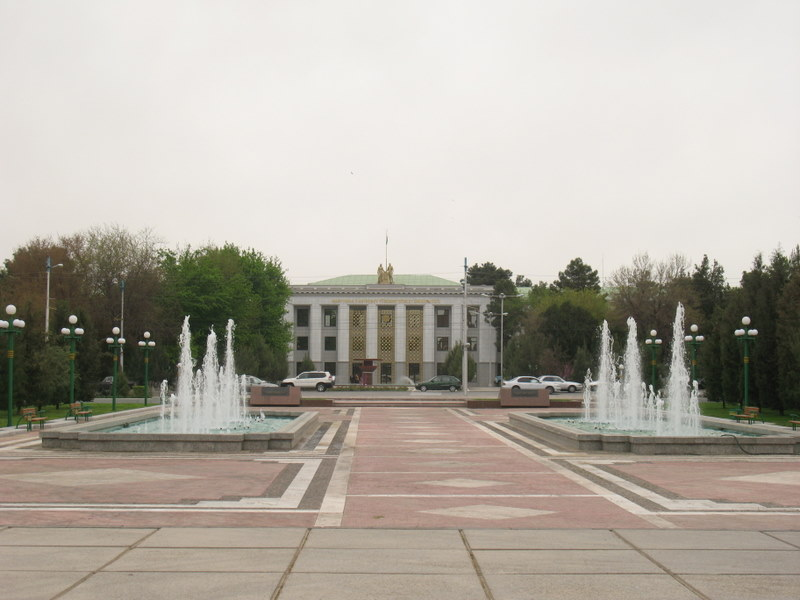
The Soviet building of TSU

Turkmen State University named after Maxim Gorky was founded on July 14, 1950, through the reorganization of the Ashkhabad Pedagogical Institute, which had existed since 1931. It has been a member of the Eurasian Association of Universities since 1989. It was renamed in honor of the Turkmen poet Magtymguly Pyragy in 1993.

== Faculties ==
- Mathematics and Mechanics
- Physics and Astronomy
- Informatics and Computer Engineering
- Biological Sciences
- Chemistry
- Earth Sciences
- Psychological Sciences
- Linguistics and Study of Literature (specialties: Turkmen Language and Literature; English Language and Literature; German Language and Literature; French Language and Literature; Italian Language and Literature; Arabic Language and Literature; Turkish Language and Literature; Persian Language and Literature; Chinese Language and Literature, Russian Language and Literature).
- Mass Media and Information-Library Science
- History and Archeology
- Philosophy and Ethics
- Theology
- Political Sciences and Regional Studies
- Jurisprudence

== Campus ==
In 2007, the French company Bouygues built the main building of TSU with a library, a reading room, an assembly hall and a total area of 13,500 m^{2} at a cost of $40 million.

Bouygues under contract with TSU executed reconstruction of buildings for $45 million. The firm also reconstructed of the façade of the main building as well as one other.

On September 1, 2008, the physics and mathematics faculty was opened. President of Turkmenistan Gurbanguly Berdimuhamedov attended the dedication of the building. On September 1, 2011, the faculty of geography and two blocks of dormitories built by Bouygues were opened. The geography building can accommodate 800 students.

== Famous alumni ==
During World War II, part of Moscow State University was evacuated to Ashgabat (then known as Ashkhabad), where it operated out of the Ashkhabad Pedagogical Institute. Many classes were taught jointly by the two institutions. Among the Moscow State University graduates in 1942 was the famous Soviet physicist and human-rights defender Andrei Sakharov, who completed his degree program in Ashkhabad.

Other alumni include football manager Kurban Berdyev, businessman Igor Makarov, and entomologist Svetlana Myartseva.
