= Svetlina =

Svetlina may refer to:

- Svetlina, Sredets Municipality, a village in Sredets Municipality, Burgas Province, Bulgaria
- Svetlina, Dimitrovgrad Municipality, a village in Dimitrovgrad Municipality, Haskovo Province, Bulgaria
- Svetlina, Topolovgrad Municipality, a village in Topolovgrad Municipality, Haskovo Province, Bulgaria
- Svetlina AD, the name of two Bulgarian lighting manufacturing plants

== See also ==
- Svetlana (disambiguation)
