= Svetlana (ballad) =

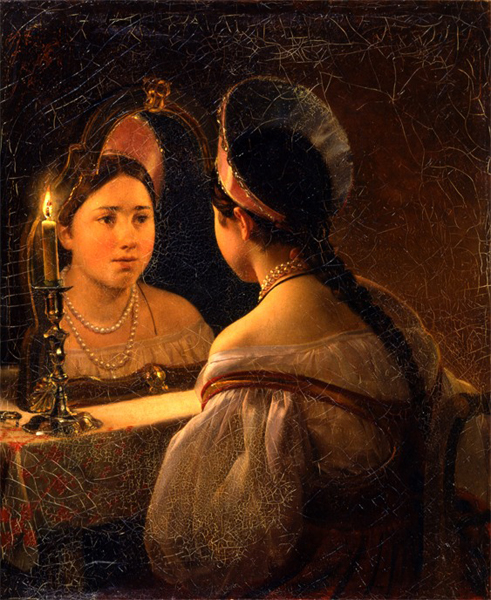
- Karl Bryullov, Svetlana at Fortune-telling
- Author: Vasily Zhukovsky
- Original title: Светлана
- Language: Russian
- Genre: Ballad
- Published: 1813
- Publisher: Vestnik Evropy

Svetlana is a ballad by the Russian poet Vasily Zhukovsky, published in 1813. It is one of Zhukovsky's three adaptations of Gottfried Bürger's ballad Lenore. It is often credited with popularizing the given name Svetlana, which is also the name of the protagonist.

== Creation and publication history ==
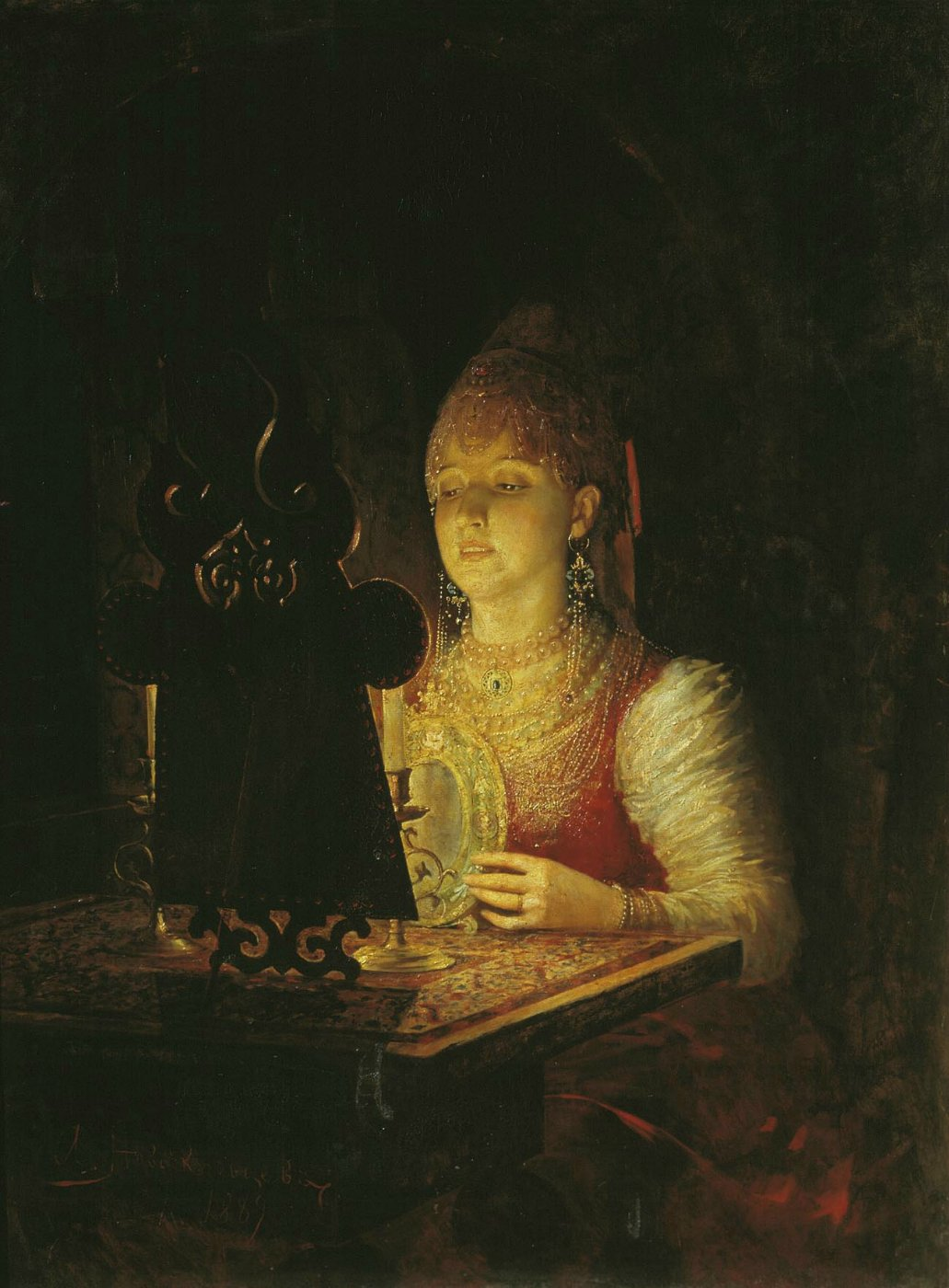
Svetlana, oil painting by Alexander Novoskoltsev

Zhukovsky began work on Svetlana in 1808 and completed it in 1812. The ballad was first published in the journal Vestnik Evropy in 1813. It was dedicated to Zhukovsky's niece and student Alexandra Andreevna Voeikova (who was the sister of the poet's muse Maria Protasova-Moyer), as a wedding gift to her.

The plot is based on Gottfried Bürger's ballad Lenore. Zhukovsky wrote three works based on Lenore. His ballad Lyudmila, written in 1808, is a free adaptation of Lenore which gives the story a Russian setting. Svetlana also has a Russian setting and is the adaptation that varies the most in subject from the original. Later, in 1831, Zhukovsky translated Lenore more accurately, maintaining its original setting.

== Synopsis ==
A Russian girl, Svetlana, anxiously awaits the return of her betrothed. Her friends convince her to participate in the traditional fortune-telling rituals on the eve of Epiphany. She looks into a mirror and sees her betrothed, who beckons her to follow him. They ride on a sleigh through snowy fields in the night. In a hut, Svetlana is attacked by a corpse that rises from its coffin. The corpse is revealed to be her betrothed. Svetlana is protected by a white dove. She awakes with a scream; the ordeal is revealed to have been a dream. Svetlana is disturbed by the ominous dream and wonders what it could mean. She is saddened and silent until a sleigh arrives, carrying her betrothed, alive and well.

== Artistic originality ==
Svetlana consists of 20 stanzas of alternating trochaic trimeter (feminine rhymes) and trochaic tetrameter (masculine rhymes). Each stanza has 14 lines with the rhyme scheme AbAbCdCdEEfGGf (masculine capitalized, feminine lowercase) and thus somewhat resembles a sonnet.

The poem is one of the most popular works of Russian romanticism and helped popularize the given name Svetlana, which had been coined by Aleksandr Vostokov in 1802.

Svetlana is mentioned and quoted several times by Alexander Pushkin in his verse novel Eugene Onegin and in the story The Blizzard. In his commentary on Eugene Onegin (Ch. III, V, 2-4), Vladimir Nabokov assesses the ballad as a "masterpiece" and suggests that Pushkin's "Onegin stanza" arose under the influence of this unusual sonnet stanza in Zhukovsky.
