= Svetlana Bogdanova =

Svetlana Bogdanova may refer to:

- Svetlana Bogdanova (handballer) (born 1964), Russian handball player
- Svetlana Bogdanova (water polo) (born 1976), Russian water polo player
