= Svetlana Smirnova =

Svetlana Smirnova may refer to:

- Svetlana Smirnova (sport shooter) (born 1962), Russian sport shooter
- Svetlana Smirnova (actress) (born 1956), Soviet and Russian film and stage actress
- Svetlana Anatolievna Smirnova (born 1977), Russian handball world champion
