= Svetlana Myartseva =

Researcher and entomologist

Svetlana Nikolaevna Myartseva (Russian: Светлана Николаевна Мярцева; born 1937) is an entomologist from Turkmenistan, who is professor at the Universidad Autónoma de Tamaulipas in Mexico. Her research interests lie in the systematics and biology of the families of parasitic chalcid wasps Encyrtidae and Aphelinidae.

== Biography ==
Born in Ashgabat in 1937, Myartseva studied at the Turkmen State University from 1954 to 1959. She was an assistant in the Entomology Laboratory of the Institute of Zoology of the Turkmen Academy of Sciences from 1959 to 1961. In 1985 she received her doctorate in biological sciences from the Zoological Institute at the Russian Academy of Sciences in Leningrad with the dissertation: Sphecid wasps (Hymenoptera: Sphecidae) of the lower parts of Murgab and Tedjen and their role as entomophages in nature and agriculture. A specialist in systematics and biology, she conducted research at the Turkmen State University until 1998, working as senior researcher, deputy director of the institute and then head of the entomological laboratory.

In 1998 Myartseva moved to Mexico and began research at the Universidad Autónoma de Tamaulipas in Ciudad Victoria. She was invited to work there in order to research and build a study collection of the Aphelinidae. Promoted to professor in 2000, as of 2017, she is the only woman in the university to have achieved Level II in the Mexican National Researchers Programme.

Myartseva has discovered and described one genus and over 140 new species. This includes expanding species in Encarsia fourfold. The results of her research are relevant to agriculture and the environment, and in 2019 she collaborated on a project assessing whitefly impact.

== Awards ==
In 1968 she received the Distinguished Labor medal according to the decree of the Presidium of the Supreme Soviet of the USSR.

== Patronyms ==
- Metaphycus myartsevai Özdikmen, 2011
- Myartsevaia Noyes, 2010
- Myartsevaia chrysopae (Crawford, 1913) (=Ooencyrtus chrysopae)
- Myartsevaia limeirae (Myartseva, 2004) (= Ooencyrtus limeirae )
- Myartsevaia melos Noyes, 2010
- Myartsevaia sibyna Noyes, 2010
- Neophytis myartsevae Kim & Heraty, 2012
