= Svetlana Bachevanova =

Bulgarian photographer

Svetlana Bachevanova is a notable Bulgarian photographer. She served as lead photographer for an anti-communist newspaper, Demokrazia, and for the first democratically elected Bulgarian Prime Minister. She now lives in the United States, where she launched FotoEvidence, which supports the role of photojournalists.

== Life ==
Bachevanova was born in Bulgaria. Her father wanted her to have a career in medicine so he arranged for her to become a medical photographer in the hope that her then enthusiasm for sculpture might be transferred to medicine. Bachevanova however developed her interest in pictures. She learnt to take pictures of microscope samples, unusual skin diseases and surgical operations and she used these skills to take family photographs. She then photographed commercially recording art. She became a photojournalist for the anti-communist newspaper Demokrazia in 1990. She published "The Street" which records her pictures from the non-violent revolution in Bulgaria.

After Bulgaria became independent on 10 November 1989, it was proposed that she become the official photographer who would accompany the new Prime Minister Filip Dimitrov on his official work. This included the important meeting between the first democratically elected Bulgarian Prime Minister and the American President. Bachevanova was given a tour of the White House by David Valdez and she was introduced by him to the American President Bush.

She was sent to cover the Kosovo War and she was able to capture important images which recorded atrocities against the men of Pristina by the Serbian militia. She could speak their language and she understood their history of oppression by communists. She was able to photograph the bodies of men who had been tortured and castrated before they died. Her anticipation meant that when her films were confiscated on leaving the area the soldiers only took newly loaded film and the incrimination pictures could be published by the Bulgarian News Agency.

She emigrated to the US in 2001 to photograph events following 9/11. She also went to study the poverty of the Lakota people at their reservation in North Dakota. She identified with their position and equated it to the lack of opportunity for the poor in communist Bulgaria. She was drawn to the Lakota as she saw them portrayed in communist propaganda films. The Soviets made films where the American Indians were the goodies and the American cowboys were the baddies. The Lakota dance in the head dresses that are stereotypical in Soviet films which she watched as a child.

She had an idea which became the web site FotoEvidence after she received support of money and skills. The site is not censored in terms of content or quality and it records life as it is. The project has also launched a book award which a jury recognises as important photo projects that address social justice. The pictures of the winner and four finalists are in an exhibition in New York each autumn. The winner's pictures are published in a book. Marcus Bleasdale won the award for an 18-month study of the situation in the Central African Republic.

== Works ==
- The Street
