= Svetlana Kryuchkova =

Svetlana Kryuchkova may refer to:

- Svetlana Nikolaevna Kryuchkova (born 1950), Russian actress
- Svetlana Valentinovna Kryuchkova (born 1985), Russian volleyball player
