= Svetlana Boyko =

Svetlana Boyko may refer to:

- Svetlana Boyko (fencer)
- Svetlana Boyko (speed skater)
