= Svitlana Okley =

Ukrainian murderer (born 1969)

- Born: Svitlana Viktorivna Okley; 31 October 1969 (age 56); Krasnodon, Luhansk Oblast, Ukrainian SSR, USSR
- Conviction: Murder (2 counts)
- Penalty: 15 years

Details
- Victims: 2
- Span of crimes: February – November 2011
- Country: Ukraine
- Date apprehended: 31 July 2012

Svitlana Viktorivna Okley (Ukrainian: Світлана Вікторівна Оклей; born 31 October 1969) is a Ukrainian convicted murderer from Krasnodon, who in August 2012 kidnapped 3-year-old Khrystyna Kabakova together with her husband and eldest daughter in order to hide the murder of two adopted children. The crime received widespread attention, showing serious problems in the work of the children's service in Ukraine.

== The Okley family ==
The Okley family from the city of Krasnodon, was the pride of the entire mining district. The head of the family Svitlana Okley and her husband Oleksandr raised their seven children - six girls and one boy. All children were laureates and winners of numerous district competitions, talented and gifted.

Okley wrote children's fairy tales, which she later published in self-published collections, wrote songs and organized the children's family ensemble "Oklei", which participated in all significant events of Krasnodon and the Krasnodon Raion.

In 2003, the local authorities presented a five-room apartment in the center of Krasnodon to an exemplary family with many children at the address of kv. Radyanskyi 2/111, to which the family is moving from a neighboring village. Also in 2007, by order of President Viktor Yushchenko, Okley received the honorary title of mother-heroine. Neighbors behind the apartment building described the family as withdrawn and unfriendly.

== Murders ==
Starting in February 2011, Okley began to inflict numerous blows and beatings on the adopted children in order to force the adopted children to strictly comply with all her demands. In February, Liza died from beatings. When Okley realized that the girl was dead, she ordered her husband and eldest daughter to get rid of the body. They put the corpse in a bag, took it outside the city to the rural house in which they had previously lived, and after moving to Krasnodon they began to use it as a dacha, and there the father and daughter burned the girl’s corpse in a metal vat for four hours.

In November 2011, Okley killed Liza’s sister Katya. For "educational purposes", Svitlana beat the child for a long time, and when she died, the body was dismembered and buried not far from the dacha. After the murders, the family did not stop taking part in the public life of the city.

One of Okley’s eldest daughters, Yulia, said that the children could stand in the corner all day. They were forbidden to move, otherwise Okley would punch them on the head, kick them on the back and all over the body. She beat me cruelly and sophisticatedly. Adoptive Katya constantly had a large bump on her head, and the girl lost consciousness several times. Okley pierced her lower jaw right through, and when Yulia fed the girl, food leaked from the bottom of her chin, since there was a through hole through her mouth.

== Kidnapping ==
On 30 July 2012, the police received a call. A resident of Simeykyne called. She reported the abduction of her three-year-old daughter Khrystyna Kabakova. According to her, her six-year-old eldest son was walking with his sister on the street when strangers drove up to them - a man, a woman and a girl. The girl was grabbed and thrown into the sidecar of a motorcycle, where one of the kidnappers was sitting, and taken away in an unknown direction. The entire city police were raised to their feet, and based on the boy’s words, a composite sketch of the kidnappers was compiled. Orientations were sent out. As a result, the girl was found on 31 July under a bed, covered with a pile of rags at the Okley family’s dacha.

A few minutes later, the owners showed up and said that this girl was their daughter Liza. Soon the parents of the kidnapped Khrystyna Kabakova arrived at the house. The Okleys began to get out of it, declaring that two of their adopted daughters allegedly disappeared back in the winter, allegedly someone kidnapped them. They didn’t want to report it to the police, but decided to take revenge and kidnap someone else’s child.

Next to the parents was their son Illia. The police were horrified when they noticed him in which the boy was covered in bruises and scars. Seizing a moment when his adoptive mother was not looking at him, the child pulled the hand of one of the policemen and whispered: "Take me away from here, otherwise they will kill me." Oleksandr, the husband of Svitlana Okley, was later found in the attic, where he tried to hide.

The father and daughter were the first to confess. They told the true motives for the kidnapping of 3-year-old Khrystyna; they needed the kidnapped child in order to replace one of the murdered girls.

== Trial and conviction ==
Okley was charged with the murder of two children. Also, she and her husband and their daughter Yulia were accused of kidnapping a child. The Okley couple were taken into custody. Yulia was left to await trial in freedom, taking into account her sincere repentance. Also, the prosecutor's office of Krasnodon opened a criminal case against the deputy head of the children's service under the local executive committee. Law enforcement officers felt that service officers could monitor the family more closely. The medical records of the sisters killed in 2011 indicated that both received their last vaccinations in May 2012.

On 11 December 2012, the trial of the Okley spouses and one of the eldest daughters, Yulia, began. Yulia and Oleksandr Okley fully admitted their guilt. They confirmed that Svitlana tortured and ultimately killed her adopted children. Okley, however, insisted on her innocence and continued to claim that the children were kidnapped and the case against her was actually fabricated.

Even Okley's lawyer, unable to stand it, declared at the trial that his client was a real monster. Okley was offended by this wording, and she was provided with a second lawyer. In the courtroom, Okley tried to convince journalists that the case against her was fabricated, and that her husband and Yulia were lovers, which is why they were testifying against her.

According to the verdict of the Krasnodon District Court, Svitlana Okley was sentenced to 15 years in prison, her husband Oleksandr - to 4 years in prison, and the eldest daughter Yulia Okley, who helped hide traces of the crime and participated in the kidnapping of a child, - to 4 years in prison with 3 of them suspended, due to the fact that at the time of the trial, she was pregnant.

In March 2013, Okley filed an appeal against the court's decision. Herappeal began to be considered on 8 November in the Luhansk Court of Appeal. On that day, the first court hearing took place, at which, in addition to Svitlana Okley’s appeal, they considered appeals filed by her husband Oleksandr and her lawyer. On 26 November, all sentences were left upheld by the appellate court.
