= Svetlana Vukajlović =

Serbian lawyer

Svetlana Vukajlović (born 1960, in Belgrade) was the Director General of the Republic Institute for Health Insurance in the Republic of Serbia. Vukajlovic graduated from the University of Belgrade Faculty of Law. She holds a master's degree in the field of management and successfully passed the bar exam.

== Career ==
In addition to her role as Director General of the Republic Institute for Health, Vukajlović has held several managerial positions since 1995, the most notable being her role as the Director of Zepter Insurance and the Director of Delta Insurance Development. She was the first female director of an insurance organization in Serbian history.

=== Republic Institute for Health Insurance ===
From 2004 to 2010, Vukajlovic was the Director General of the Republic Institute for Health Insurance. She was the first female director at the institute and held the longest term of office in that position in the history of the institute. Vukajlovic brought the institution back to its insurees for management who compose the Board of Directors of the Institute through the representatives of the union of employees, pensioners, farmers, sole proprietors and associations of disabled persons. For a short period, Vukajlovic managed to transform this institution from having a bad image of poor management into a transparent institution operating under the principles of transparency, economic and equitable distribution of funds and focusing more towards insurees’ interests. All financial flows of the Institute are available on the web site making the Institute a unique organization in Serbia. During her six-year tenure, Vukajlovic transformed the institution from a deficit funding organization into a sustainable financial system that timely effects the payment for its obligations.

Better management of the institute resulted in:

- a transparent system of funding healthcare providers
- reduced waiting lists
- doubled number of drugs covered by insurance and reduced drug costs
- introduction of pharmaco-economics in Serbian healthcare
- significant improvement in the field of exercising health insurance rights (medical and technical aids, spa rehabilitations, funding new healthcare services)
- introduction of information systems and development of e-health to the insurance industry in Serbia
- returning Galenika Pharmaceuticals" to 100% state ownership as a result of the dispute won against an American company; this resulted in additional savings of 17 million euros
- salaries of 100,000 healthcare professionals tripled compared to 2004 statistics

=== Zepter Insurance ===
Under Vukajlovic's oversight as director at Zepter Insurance, the company saw, for a short period, a 300% growth in sales and profit, bringing Zepter to a leading position in the field of life insurance. She is a pioneer in introducing a modern life insurance and sales network in the market that resembles reputable European insurance companies.

=== Delta Insurance Development ===
At Delta Insurance Development, Vukajlovic designed and developed a completely new line of products of voluntary health insurance that all insurance companies in the Republic of Serbia will have soon incorporated in their portfolios, covering over million insureds.

== Personal life ==
Photography is Vukajlovic's hobby. In March 2008, she organized a humanitarian exhibition of her photographs. The collected funds were invested into the construction of the first "Parental Home". Parental Home is within the Republic Institute for Health Insurance in Belgrade and provides mother and child healthcare. The home covers 800 m2 and is the first institution of this type in Serbia. Parental Home is intended for children subject to hemato-oncological treatments and their parents while receiving treatments.

== Awards and recognitions ==
Vukajlovic has received numerous plaques, acknowledgments and rewards from numerous associations of patients, as well as from associations of disabled persons for her contributions, personal efforts and work to improve their rights in the Republic of Serbia.

- 2006
  - "Blic Daily Papers" readers announced her new position as Minister of Health and a female member of Government
- 2007
  - Belgrade Chamber of Commerce elected her a "Manager of the Year"
  - "CORDiplomatique" Magazine (a magazine of diplomatic and consular missions in Serbia) included her in the list of 10 most successful women in Serbia
  - "Sun Clock Award" from the Serbian Clinical Centre and the magazine "Viva" for the results achieved in the field of health and science
- 2009
  - Vukajlovic received an award from the Association of Journalists
  - special award from the European Health Forum for the results achieved in the reformation of the List of drugs and reducing drug prices

== See also ==
- health insurance
