= International Institute of Depth Psychology =

- Established: 2001
- Location: Kyiv, Ukraine

The International Institute of Depth Psychology (IIDP) is a private higher educational establishment in Kyiv, Ukraine. It specializes in psychoanalytic education, including theoretical psychoanalytic education, psychoanalytic training (personal analysis) and supervision support for the beginning of practical psychotherapeutic activities.

The IIDP was founded in 2001 as the Kyiv branch of the Eastern European Institute of Psychoanalysis (St. Petersburg), but became independent a year later. In 2002 the International Institute of Depth Psychology obtained its first State License of the Ministry of Education and Science of Ukraine for psychoanalytic programs in education.

The institute includes post-graduate psychoanalytic education, the Magistracy of Humanitarian and Social Sciences on Psychology, counseling centers, and a publishing house. The IIDP is a collective member of the Ukrainian Association of Psychoanalysis.

In 2011 the Institute was accredited by the European Confederation of Psychoanalytic Psychotherapies. A founder and a rector of the Institute is Svetlana Uvarova.

== Programs ==
The Institute offers a postgraduate course that lasts two and a half years.

The curriculum includes history, theory, methods and techniques of classical psychoanalysis and the main contemporary psychodynamic approaches. Students completing the course earn a National Diploma of Specialist in retraining within specialization in “Practical Psychology (psychoanalysis).”

The institute conducts research on psychoanalytic, psychotherapeutic, socially-psychological and socially-economic problems. The Institute executes consulting, training and supervisory activities. It offers specialized conferences, seminars, round tables, press conferences and tutorial training.

== Departments ==
=== History and Theory of Psychoanalysis ===
The chairperson of the Department of the History and Theory of Psychoanalysis is Svetlana Bondareva, a psychoanalyst with a master's degree in Clinical Psychology from the University of Nice Sophia Antipolis.

=== Clinical Psychoanalysis ===
The chairperson of the Department of Clinical Psychoanalysis is Inna Karavanova, a psychoanalyst with a master's degree in Psychology from Strasbourg University. She specializes in working with children and adolescents, a chairperson of the section of child psychoanalysis

== Magistracy of Humanitarian and Social Sciences on Psychology ==
In 2011 a project called Magistracy of Humanitarian and Social Sciences on Psychology was started. The project is a collaboration between the University of Strasbourg, the University of Nice, the IIDP and National Pedagogical Dragomanov University.

A magistracy is a form of training where students engage in psychoanalytic, clinical, scientific and research activities in clinical psychology. It is designed for students who plan to continue their education in doctoral studies or conduct professional activities at a higher level. The program combines aspects of French and Ukrainian approaches in education. The course lasts two years.

The course includes fundamental and theoretical study of psychoanalysis, research activities in the field of practical, social psychology and psychoanalysis.

== Counseling Center ==
The Counseling Center offers qualified psychoanalysts who assistance to adults, adolescents and children.

=== Crisis Center ===
The center on overcoming crisis is a branch of the Counseling Center. It was established to help people in serious psychological distress. The specialists have completed a specialized program of training in Israel.

== Center for Psychological Expertise ==
The center is accredited by the Ukrainian Association of Psychoanalysis. The Center carries out psychological research in civil and criminal legal proceedings. The Center also carries out psycho-diagnostics of personality, study of child-parent relations and career counseling.

== Publishing ==
The literary publishing house International Institute of Depth Psychology was founded in 2003. It publishes scientific literature on psychoanalysis, books and periodicals Psychoanalysis (Chronicle) and the Russian-language version of the European Journal of Psychoanalysis.
