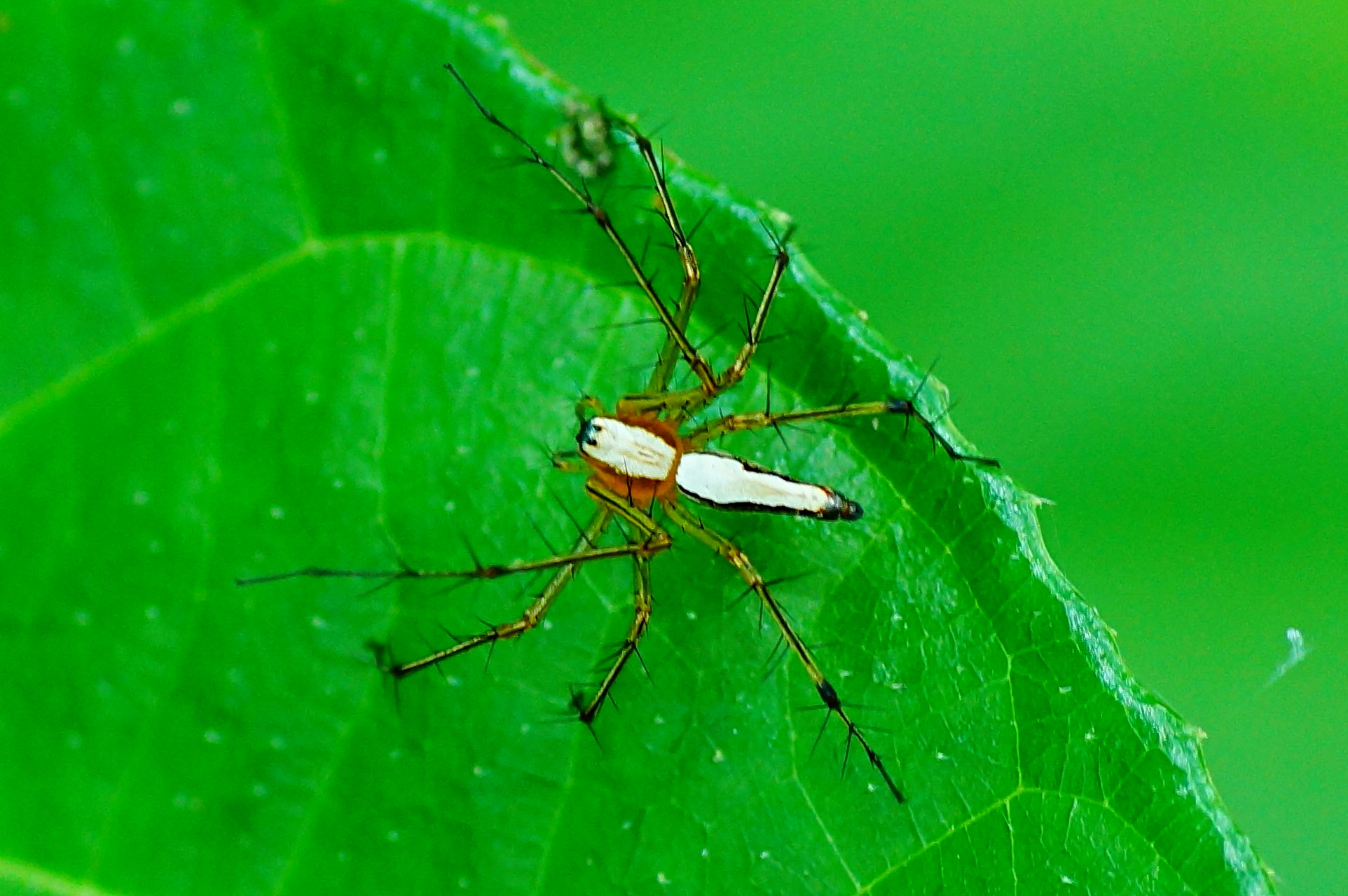

Scientific classification
- Kingdom: Animalia
- Phylum: Arthropoda
- Subphylum: Chelicerata
- Class: Arachnida
- Order: Araneae
- Infraorder: Araneomorphae
- Family: Oxyopidae
- Genus: Oxyopes
- Species: O. shweta

Binomial name
- Oxyopes shweta Tikader, 1970

= Oxyopes shweta =

Species of spider

Oxyopes shweta is a species of lynx spider. This spider is found in Pakistan, India and China.

== Description ==
An active hunter and is commonly seen in green leaves of plants actively searching for prey.
