= Svetlana Kotochigova =

Physicist

Svetlana Alexandrovna Kotochigova is a Soviet and American physicist whose research involves the theory and simulation of ultracold atoms and ultracold molecules. She is a research professor of physics at Temple University and a researcher at the National Institute of Standards and Technology and Smithsonian Astrophysical Observatory.

== Education and career ==
Kotochigova earned a doctorate at Saint Petersburg State University in 1981, and worked as a researcher at the Vavilov State Optical Institute from 1981 to 1991. After short-term positions in Greece, Foundation for research and Technology (IESL), and France, Atomic Energy Commission of France, she came to the US as a guest researcher at the National Institute of Standards and Technology (NIST) in 1994, and continued at NIST as a research associate beginning in 1997.

In 2004, she added affiliations as a research professor at Temple University and as a research associate at the Smithsonian Astrophysical Observatory.

Research interests include relativistic quantum theory and its applications, atomic and molecular electronic structure and spectroscopy, QED effects in hydrogen and hydrogen-like ions, ultracold atom-atom interactions and optical lattices, and online atomic and molecular databases.

== Recognition ==
Kotochigova was elected as a Fellow of the American Physical Society (APS) in 2011, after a nomination from the APS Division of Atomic, Molecular and Optical Physics, "for insightful theoretical description of the formation and control of ultracold molecules in optical trapping potentials".
