= Svetlana Uvarova =

Psychoanalyst

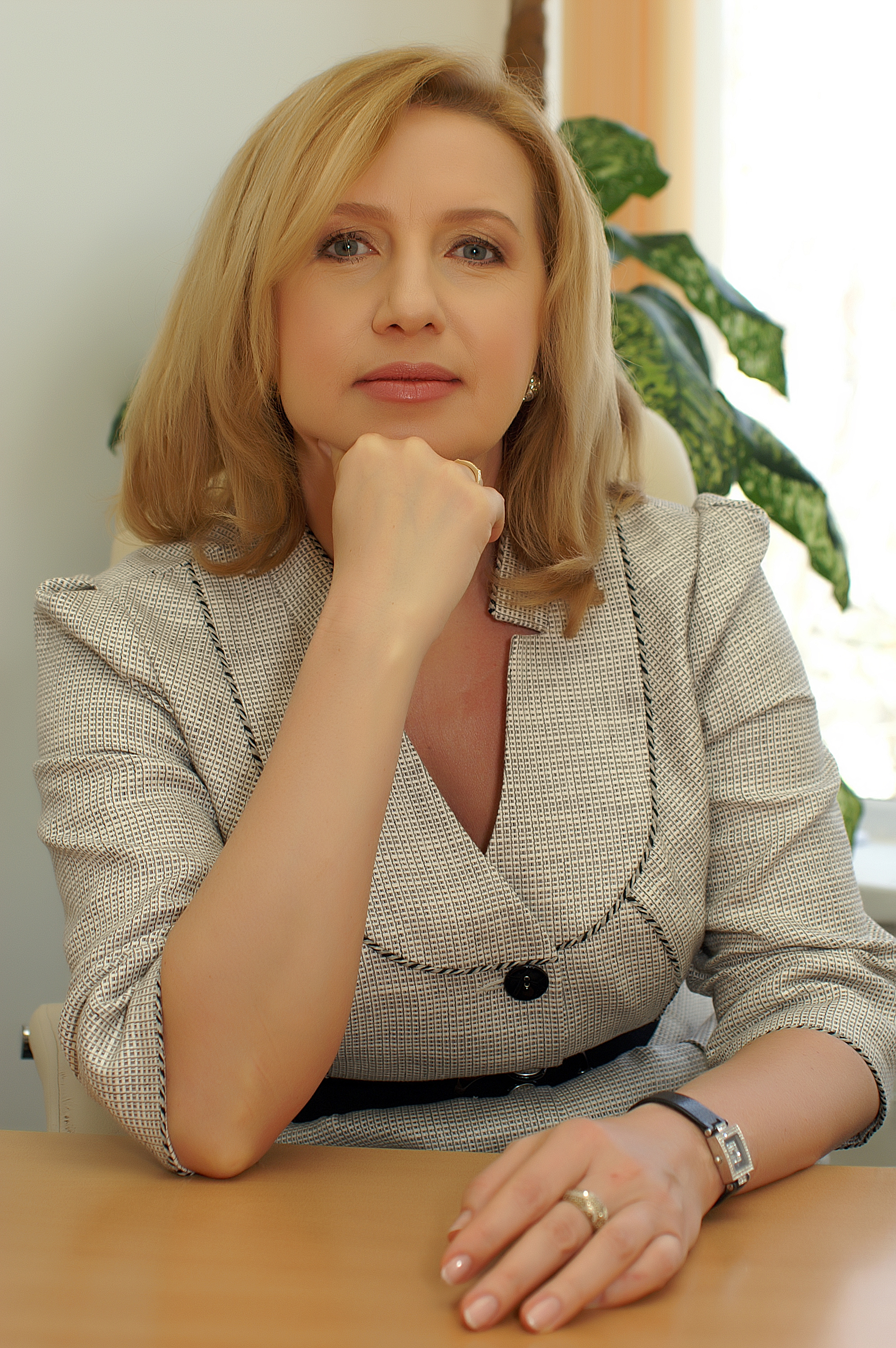
Svetlana Uvarova in 2010

Svetlana Uvarova (Ukrainian: Світлана Геннадіївна Уварова; born June 20, 1964) is a Ukrainian psychoanalyst who is founder and rector of the International Institute of Depth Psychology (Kyiv, Ukraine), president of the Ukrainian Association of Psychoanalysis and the International Federation of Psychoanalysis, board member, certified training analyst and supervisor of the European Confederation of Psychoanalytic Psychotherapies (Vienna, Austria), member of the World Council for Psychotherapy, editor-in-chief of the journal Psychoanalysis.Chronicle (Kyiv, Ukraine), a member of the editorial board of the European Journal of Psychoanalysis (Rome, Italy, New York, USA), editor-in-chief of its Russian language version (Kyiv, Ukraine).

== Education ==
In 1988 graduated from the Order of Honor of the Higher Trade Union School of Culture and in 1999 from the East European Institute of Psychoanalysis (Saint Petersburg, Russia). Later in 2013 got master's degree of Humanitarian Sciences on Psychology at the University of Strasbourg. In the same year got an academic degree of the Candidate of Pedagogical Sciences, specializing in the theory and methodology of training in technologies, Ph.D. thesis on ‘Self-realization of the personality of the student in the artistic and aesthetic direction of extracurricular education’.

== Biography ==
In 1996–1997, Uvarova was a psychologist in the Medical Advisory Center MRI. Since 1997 to 1999 she worked as a psychologist at the Charitable Foundation for promoting Mental Culture Institute of developmental psychotechnologies;

In 1999–2001, she was a Director of Kyiv branch institution of the East European Institute of Psychoanalysis;

In 2000, she became a board member of the European Confederation of Psychoanalytic Psychotherapies (Vienna, Austria);

In 2001–2004 she was a Director of the LLC International Institute of Depth Psychology;

In 2003, she became President of the All-Ukrainian Non-Governmental Organization Ukrainian Association of psychoanalysis and editor-in-chief of the journal Psychoanalysis.Chronicle (Kyiv, Ukraine). In the next year Svetlana became a Rector of the Private Higher Educational Establishment International Institute of Depth Psychology.

Since 2005, Svetlana is a member of the editorial board of the European Journal of Psychoanalysis (Rome, Italy);

In 2008 Svetlana took part in the educational project Organization and assistance in stress and crisis situations organized by The Community Stress Prevention Center (Israel);

In 2012, she became a member of the World Council for Psychotherapy (Vienna, Austria);

In 2013 she became an editor-in-chief of Russian language version of the European Journal of Psychoanalysis (Kyiv, Ukraine);

In March, 2015, she became corresponding member of the G.S. Kostiuk Institute of Psychology of the National Academy of Educational Sciences of Ukraine;

In 2015 she became a President of the International Federation of Psychoanalysis (Strasburg, France).

== International scientific cooperation ==
The University of Nice Sophia Antipolis (Université de Nice Sophia-Antipolis) (fr.) Nice, France; Institute for Advanced Studies in Psychoanalysis (I.S.A.P.) Rome, Italy; Argentine Psychoanalytic Association (La Asociación Psicoanalítica Argentina) (es.) Buenos Aires, Argentina.

== Works ==
- Uvarova Svetlana The Hidden Side of the Moon. Beyond the Feminine // European Journal of Psychoanalysis.
- Uvarova Svetlana Il destino della Fanciulla di Neve nel XXI° secolo // European Journal of Psychoanalysis.
