= Svetlana Gorokhovich =

Russian pianist

- Born: Kazan, Russia
- Occupations: Pianist, recording musician
- Known for: Playing piano
- Style: Classic

Svetlana Gorokhovich (Russian: Светлана Горохович) is a pianist and recording musician.

== Career ==
A native of Kazan, Russia, Gorokhovich started playing when she was five years old. At age fourteen she performed Piano Concerto No. 1 (Chopin) with the Kazan Philharmonic Orchestra conducted by Nathan Rachlin. She continued her musical education at the Kazan State Conservatory and received a doctorate from the St. Petersburg State Conservatory. Her teachers included Marina Arbuzova, Irina Dubinina and Tatiana Kravchenko.

Svetlana immigrated as a political refugee to the USA in 1989 in pursuit of an active performing and teaching career. In 1997 she shared an honorable mention at the Seventeenth Bartok-Kabalevsky International Piano Competition at Radford University (1997). At the IBLA International Competition in Italy (1999) Svetlana received the Johan S. Bach Special Mention Award in the Piano Competition and the Baroque Competition.

From 1991–1996, Svetlana worked with internationally acclaimed violinist Dmitri Berlinsky, touring worldwide including Virgin Islands, Japan and United States. This collaboration resulted in a CD production by Helicon Records called "Souvenir D’un Lieu Cher". Since 1996, Svetlana's solo and chamber music performances have included major concert halls in the United States, Canada, Germany, the Netherlands, Japan, Caribbean, Iceland and Italy.

Svetlana’s appearance in Weill Recital Hall (Carnegie Hall) in 1997 with violinist Eva Ingolfsdottir resulted in "Sonata", a recording by Japis Record (acquired by Zonet Music in Iceland). Since 2006, Svetlana has performed and collaborated with distinguished cellist Misha Quint. In 2010, Svetlana recorded "Valse Sentimentale" with Misha Quint by Volshebnik Productions studio. Svetlana was invited to perform annually in Weill Recital at Carnegie Hall from 2011 to 2014 as part of Interharmony Music Festival.

Svetlana has successfully built experience in piano duos: In 2006, SMH Music published a new edition of a previous recording by Svetlana Gorokhovich and Liliya Khobotkova called "Russian Sketches" with the music of Valery Gavrilin and Rachmaninoff for piano duo. In 2008, this CD was featured by IcelandAir as part of their classic music program. Svetlana's latest piano duo recital with Liliya in 2011 was at Tillett Gardens on St. Thomas. This performance included a debut of "Tango Suite" by Astor Piazzolla, originally written for guitar duo Odair and Sergio Assad and arranged for four hands by Clarice Assad. Svetlana also established a collaboration with Irina Portenko in Germany at the Sulzbach-Rosenberg Music Festival and New York (Music Conservatory of Westchester).

Due to her accomplishments in piano performance, Svetlana was presented with the "Arkansas Traveler" and "Honorary Citizen" awards in 1999 "as an ambassador of fellowship and goodwill for the City of Little Rock to all people" after a concert and TV appearance in Arkansas.

In addition to her active performance schedule, Svetlana teaches students privately and as a piano faculty member of the Music Conservatory of Westchester, White Plains, New York.

== Recordings ==
- With violinist Dmitri Berlinsky: Souvenir D’un Lieu Cher (Helicon Records, 1997)
- With violinist Eva Ingolfsdottir: Sonata (Japis Record, 1998)
- With pianist Liliya Khobotkova: Russian Sketches (SMH Music, 2006)
- With cellist Misha Quint: Valse Sentimentale (Volshebnik Productions, 2010)
- With pianist Liliya Khobotkova: One Piano Four Hands (SMH Musicllc, 2012)
- With cellist Misha Quint: Tempo Trapezio (Blue Griffin, 2014)

== Films ==
- Enrique Granados. A Musical Portrait. 2009. SHmusic.com ( performed with cellist Elizabeth Anderson Madrigal Orientale Spanish Dance)
- Antonín Dvořák. Discovering America. 2014.( performed Two Slavonic dances for four hands, Svetlana Gorokhovich and Irena Portenko)
- Sound track for "WTERT Awards 2004 - 2014" annual documentary (produced by Columbia University)

== Reviews ==
Svetlana’s performances have received consistently positive reviews from music critics around the world. In response to Souvenir D’un Lieu Cher, Robert Maxham from "Fanfare Magazine" wrote that "This is superb recital, guaranteed to raise goose flesh on anything but a corpse - and I am not so sure about the corpse. This is significant recording powerful in its emotional impact, is recommended with special urgency.". Musical critic for "The Washington Post"Joseph McLellan wrote: "...vital and memorable interpretation".

Her music performance with Anastasia Khitruk (violin)and Andrey Tchekmazov (cello) was highly acclaimed in review: "The interplay between Ms. Khitruk and her accompanist, Ms. Svetlana Gorokhovich, was delightful. Ms. Gorokhovich played the fully open grand piano so delicately, and articulating each musical phrase with intelligence and precision, that not a single note of the violin was being drowned in this acoustically challenging performance space." Her solo recital in Carnegie Hall in 2000 was highly acclaimed by the New York Concert Review. . "…outstanding performance that perfectly balanced the lyrical and dynamic resources of the piano…three sections of the Sinfonia catalogued the range and depth of Gorokhovich’s approach…Gorokhovich is a profound and almost self-effacing interpreter..."

Svetlana participated in numerous international music festivals in the Netherlands, Germany and New York City during 2005–2014. Her performance was highly acclaimed. (translation from German):

"From the first note, the musicians let loose a concussive storm, a suffering soul crying out in pain. The audience listened spellbound and, in the short pause before the second movement, could be heard audibly to exhale. Gorokhovich, particularly in the delicate passages, made the piano sing with great intimacy."

— Corinna Groth, Stadt Sulzbach-Rosenberg Zeitung, August 1, 2014

This review describes Svetlana's playing in one section "Perfekte Pianistin (Perfect pianist)" as (translation from German):

"The piano part - absolutely equal - was almost breathtakingly perfectly played...Misha Quint has Svetlana Gorokhovich as congenial partner on the piano. She has an unbelievable sureness through the passages of the octaves. She exhibits all the virtues of a perfect player."

— Helmut Fischer, Oberpfaltz.netz, 10 August 2006

.
