= Svetlana Kuznetsova (disambiguation) =

Svetlana Kuznetsova (born 1985) is an inactive Russian professional tennis player.

Svetlana Kuznetsova may also refer to:

- Svetlana Kuznetsova (basketball) (born 1965), Russian basketball player
- Svetlana Kuznetsova (cyclist) (born 1995), Russian cyclist
