= Svetlana Koroleva =

Svetlana Koroleva may refer to:

- Svetlana Koroleva (model) (born 1983), Russian model
- Svetlana Koroleva (water polo) (born 1973), Kazakhstani waterpolo player
