= Svetlana Agapitova =

Russian activist

Svetlana Yurevna Agapitova
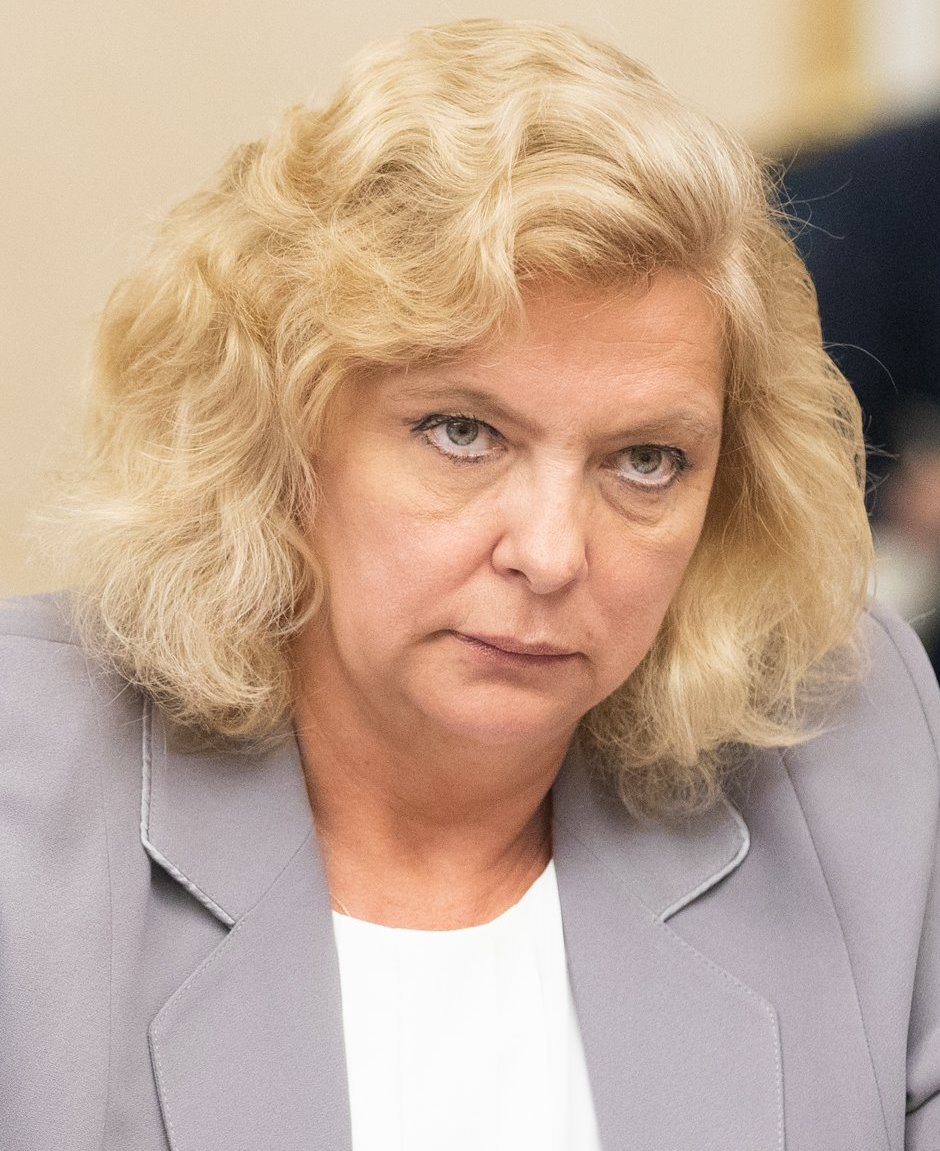
- Svetlana Agapitova in 2018
- Born: 8 February 1964 (age 62); Leningrad, Russian SFSR, Soviet Union
- Occupations: Human rights activist; social and political activist
- Known for: Commissioner for Children’s Rights in Saint Petersburg; Commissioner for Human Rights in Saint Petersburg

Svetlana Yurevna Agapitova (Russian: Светлана Юрьевна Агапитова; born February 8, 1964) is a Russian human rights activist, social and political activist.

Born on February 8, 1964, in Leningrad. She graduated from the journalism faculty of Leningrad State University in 1986. In 2012 she received a degree in law, graduated from the Russian Academy of National Economy and Public Administration under the President of the Russian Federation.

In 1989 she became a founder of information and advertising agency IMA-PRESS. Since 1991, she worked in Petersburg – Channel 5. On Channel Russia 1 led program of family and childhood.

December 23, 2009 entered the office of the Ombudsman of the child in St. Petersburg. January 21, 2015 re-elected the Commissioner for Children's Rights in St. Petersburg.

On December 1, 2021, she was elected Commissioner for Human Rights in St. Petersburg, replacing Alexander Shishlov.

Married, four children.

She has been repeatedly accused by Russian Orthodox activists of promoting abortion, homosexuality and sodomy.
