= Svetlana Yanushkevich =

Belarusian-Canadian electrical engineer

Svetlana N. Yanushkevich is an electrical engineer focusing on biometrics. She has also applied machine learning to logic design and is known for her earlier research in reversible computing. Educated in the Soviet Union, Belarus, and Poland, she works in Canada as a professor in the Department of Electrical and Software Engineering at the University of Calgary, where she heads the Biometric Technologies Laboratory. She is also associate dean for research in Calgary's Schulich School of Engineering.

== Education and career ==
Yanushkevich received a diploma equivalent to a bachelor's and master's degree in electrical and computer engineering from the Belarusian State University of Informatics and Radioelectronics in 1989 and a PhD in 1992. She received a habilitation from the Warsaw University of Technology in 1999. She has held a faculty position at the University of Calgary since 2001. She chaired the Task Force on Biometrics of the IEEE Computational Intelligence Society in 2022-2024.

== Books ==
Yanushkevich is an author or editor of books including:

- Artificial Intelligence in Logic Design (edited, Kluwer Academic Publishers, 2004)
- Logic Design of NanoICS (with Vlad P. Shmerko and Sergey Edward Lyshevski, CRC Press, 2004)
- Biometric Inverse Problems (with Adrian Stoica and Vlad P. Shmerko, CRC Press, 2005)
- Decision Diagram Techniques for Micro- and Nanoelectronic Design Handbook (with D. Michael Miller, Vlad P. Shmerko, and Radomir S. Stanković, CRC Press, 2006)
- Image Pattern Recognition: Synthesis and Analysis in Biometrics (edited with Patrick S. P. Wang, Marina L. Gavrilova, and Sargur N. Srihari, World Scientific, 2007)
- Introduction to Logic Design (with Vlad P. Shmerko, 2008)
- Computer Arithmetics for Nanoelectronics (with Vlad P. Shmerko and Sergey Edward Lyshevski, CRC Press, 2009)
- Introduction to Noise-Resilient Computing (with S. Kasai, G. Tangim, A. H. Tran, T. Mohamed, and V. P. Shmerko, Morgan & Claypool, 2013, reprinted by Springer, 2022)

== Recognition ==
Yanushkevich was named a Fellow of the Engineering Institute of Canada in 2024, after a nomination from IEEE Canada.
