= Russky Invalid =

- Frequency: Daily
- First issue: 1813
- Final issue: 1917
- Based in: Saint Petersburg, Russian Empire
- Language: Russian

Russkiy Invalid (Русский инвалид), where invalid has the meaning of a military veteran, was a newspaper of the Russian military which was published in Saint Petersburg, Russian Empire, in 1813–1917. It was originally founded by Pavel Pezarovius (its first editor, who ran the paper from 1813–1821 and 1839–1847) as a charity publication collecting funds to support the victims of the 1812 War and the families of the perished. Russkiy Invalid started out as a weekly publication, but in 1814–1815 it was coming out twice a week, and from 1816 onward published daily issues. Highly popular was the Literary Supplement to Russian Invalid.

In July 1917 the newspaper changed its name to The Army and the Navy of Free Russia (Армия и флот свободной России). Despite that, it was closed in October of that year. It was renewed in 1992 in Moscow by the journalist Nikolai Zhukov as a charity publication.
