= Svetlana Kuritsyna =

Russian journalist

Svetlana Igorevna Kuritsyna (Russian: Светла́на И́горевна Ку́рицына), also known as Sveta from Ivanovo, is a Russian journalist and activist of pro-Putin youth movement "Nashi".

She was born on July 20, 1992, in Privolzhsk, Ivanovo Oblast, Russia.

In December 2011 a short interview to the newspaper Moskovskiye Novosti, in which Sveta tried to explain why she liked the party United Russia, was uploaded to YouTube.

Some of Svetlana's answers from this interview became popular memes of Russian Internet. For example, when prompted by the reporter to name a few major accomplishments of United Russia, she used phrases which could be translated into English as "we began to dress more betterer" and "There were more... lands... I don't even know how to put it... seeding more lands... Yeah. Vegetables, rye, all that stuff". The interview led some to speculate that Svetlana was using some kind of Newspeak to communicate her thoughts.

Svetlana was invited to host a weekly talk show at NTV titled "Beam of Light", which simultaneously refers to the article of Nikolay Dobrolyubov "A Beam of Light in the Kingdom of Darkness" and to the name Svetlana that have the same root with the word Light ("svet"). She is interviewing major newsmakers – politicians, celebrities, Internet activists and others.
