= Svitlana Zakharova (singer) =

Ukrainian singer-songwriter (born 1987)

- Birth name: Svitlana Eduardivna Zakharova
- Born: 5 August 1987 (age 37); Donetsk, Donetsk Oblast, Ukraine

Svitlana Eduardivna Zakharova (Ukrainian: Світлана Едуардівна Захарова; born 5 August 1987) is a Ukrainian singer-songwriter in the jazz, classical and estrada genres as well a director of concert programs.

Her repertoire includes more than 300 songs, arias, romances, author's works in Russian, Ukrainian, English, German, French, Italian, Spanish.

== Biography ==
Zaharova was born in Donetsk to People's Artist of Ukraine opera singer and professor Alina Korobko and engineer Eduard Fedorovych Zakharov. In 2011, she married Ukrainian singer Dmytro Ihorevych Altukhov. In 2014, the family moved to Odesa. Zakharova leads an active concert activity, and also performs in charity concerts in churches and museums in Odesa.

== Education ==
In 2001, Zaharova she graduated from Donetsk music school number 1 named. M. Leontovich specialty piano. In 2004 she graduated from Donetsk College - a secondary general educational institution of a new type. In 2010 she graduated with honors from Donetsk National University and received the qualification of a specialist in jurisprudence. In 2011 she graduated with honors from the magistracy Donetsk State Music Academy. S. S. Prokofiev. In 2013 she graduated from SMW Circle in the Square Theatre School majoring in Broadway acting and singing, New York, USA.

== Solo programs ==
=== Jazz solo programs ===
- "My Funny Valentine" (Donetsk Regional Philharmonic, 2008)
- “I Love Paris, London & You” (Donetsk Regional Philharmonic, 2009)
- “When I Fall in Love” (Donetsk Regional Philharmonic, 2010)

"The Winter Show" (Odesa State Philharmonic, 2015)

=== Solo programs consisting of Baroque music ===
- "Incanto d’amore" (Donetsk Regional Philharmonic, 2011)
- "Music in the name of love" (Shakhtar Plaza, Concert Hall, 2012)

=== Christmas solo programs ===
- "Christmas Songs" (Donbass Palace, 2013)
- Christmas Eve (KADORR, Odesa, 2017)
