= Svetlana Lunina =

Soviet archaeologist

Svetlana Borisovna Lunina is an Uzbekistani archaeologist specialising in the study of ceramic material and painting techniques of Central Asian monuments. She was a professor at Tashkent State University.

== Education and career ==
Svetlana Borisovna Lunina was born in Tashkent to the family of B. V. Lunina. She attended the Faculty of History of the Central Asian State University, where she obtained a degree in history and archaeology in 1955. Between 1955 and 1958, she studied archaeology under the supervision of Mikhail Masson and Galina Pugachenkova, and in 1960, she started working as a teacher in the Department of Archaeology at Tashkent State University. She defended her thesis on ceramics from Merv in 1968, after collecting material during the expedition of the South Turkmenistan Archaeological Complex (YuTAKE).

Lunina became an associate professor at Tashkent State University in 1963 and served as the head of the department of archaeology from 1968 to 1981. From 1981 to 1984, she was an associate professor of history. She taught various aspects of Central Asian archaeology, from historical, archaeological, and artistic perspectives. As head of department, she organised courses in history and theory of arts and established a laboratory of stratigraphy of quaternary sediments and ancient mines of Uzbekistan in Samarkand, in collaboration with the department of geology.

== Research and fieldwork ==
Lunina's research covers the problems of the history of the eastern medieval city, the dynamics of its historical topography, the periodisation of the history of the development of craft production, the specialisation of craftsmanship, construction techniques, trade and cultural links both within the Central Asian region and in nearby and remote regions. She has published more than 150 scientific articles.

Lunina participated in excavations at Merv in the early sixties. She later organised expeditions in the Tashkent area (including Nogai-Kurgan, Kugaittepa, and Mingtepa cemetery) and in southern Turkmenistan. In 1964, she began participating in the expedition to Kashkasarya (TAKE), which she directed between 1968 and 1981. Its research focused on monuments ranging from the Late Bronze and Iron Age to the Middle Ages. The expedition contributed significantly to the study of the ancient cities of the Kashkadar valley, including Shakhrisyabz, Chiracchi, Kitaba and many other settlements in the area.

== Selected publications ==
- 1955: Vessel with stamped ornamentation from Tali-Barzu. Students collection, SAGU work. Edition X, Tashkent.
- 1956: From archaeological observations on Kurgan-tepe near Tashkent. Transaction of SAG, Issue XXXI, Tashkent. (co-author Usmanova)
- 1956: The technical structure of pottery kilns of the medieval Merv. Proceeding YUTAKE, volume VIII, Ashgabat.
- 1957: The first central Asian students archaeological conference. SA. 1957 n.4. ( co-author Usmanova).
- 1959: The quarter of ceramists in the western part of Merv. IAN TSSR., n.4, Ashgabat.
- 1960: Zoomorphic subjects in ceramic with stamped pottery ornaments. Workshop on the XII century quarter in Old Merv. Tashkent State University. Vol. 172, Tashkent.
- 1963: Excavation and stratigraphy pit in the southern contour of Sultan-Kala in the Old Merv. IAN TSSR, n.2, Ashgabat.
- 1966: Valuable work on the history of glass-making in Central Asia. Transaction of Tashkent State University, Vol 295. Archaeology of Central Asia VII. Tashkent (co-author I. Akhrarov).
- 1967: Mausoleum of Kyzbibi. Monument of Turkmenistan. Nn.3. Ashgabat.
- 1970: Methodology of archaeological research of a large city (based on materials YuTAKE in Merv). Medieval cities of Central Asia and Kazakhstan.
- 1972: Kashkalarya expedition. AO 1972 (co-author Usmanova and N.P. Stolyarov).
- 1974: The evolution of pottery technology in medieval Merv. Transaction YuTAKE. Tom XV. Ashgabat.
- 1975: On the possible identification of Naukad-Kureisha. Scientific works of Tashkent State University Vol 473. Materials on the history and archaeology of Central Asia. Tashkent.
- 1957: The medieval settlement of Altyn-tepe. The latest discovery of the Soviet archaeological Gov. abstracts of conference reports. Ch.P. Kiev.
- 1975: On the main results of archaeological research ion Uzbekistan. Transaction Tashkent State University. n.482. Material on history, historiography, and archaeology. Tashkent.
- 1977: Methods of construction and decoration of a mid-residential building. Construction and architecture of Uzbekistan, n.9.Tashkent.
- 1978: A musical instrument from Altyn-tepe. ONU n.5.
- 1978: Architectural decor of the monuments of Altyn-tepe. Material on history, historiography, and archeology. Scientific work at Tashkent State University. n.556. Tashkent (co-author G.I. Bogomolov).
- 1980: Medieval building materials and construction techniques in Kashkadar oasis. Construction and architecture of Uzbekistan, n.2. Tashkent.
- 1980: Metal products, household items, and jewelry from Altyn-tepe and Yalpak-tepe. Material on history, historiography, and archeology. Scientific work at Tashkent State University. n.630. Tashkent.
- 1980: Study of residential buildings in Merv during the X-XII century. Proceeding of YuTAKE. Vol. XVI. Ashgabat.
- 1981: Medieval cities and settlements of the Kashkadarya valley and their relationship with the adjacent territories. Cultural interrelations of people of Central Asia and the Caucasus Kazans with the world around us in antiquity and Middle Ages.
- 1983: Funeral equipment of the Aktam burial ground. Materials on the archaeology of Central Asia. Collection of scientific works of Tashkent State University. n.707. Tashkent.
- 1984: Residential houses of the X-XII century in the Kashkadarya oasis. Construction and architecture of Uzbekistan. Tashkent.
- 1987: Image of musicians on the ossuary from Yakkabag. Music of the people of Asia and Africa. Vol 5. Moscow.
- 1992: The culture of medieval Kesh and its connections. Central Asia and world civilization. Abstract of International Conference. Tashkent. (co-author Usmanova).
- 1993: On the historical topography of the Seleucids Merv. Merv and the Seleucid era. Abstract of a scientific conference. Mary. (co-author T. Khojaniyazov).
- 2001: The dynamics of the development of Mervin the VIII-Xi centuries. Cultural values, international yearbook. St. Petersburg. (co-author T. Khojaniyazov).
