= Edvard Rtveladze =

Georgian politician (1942–2022)

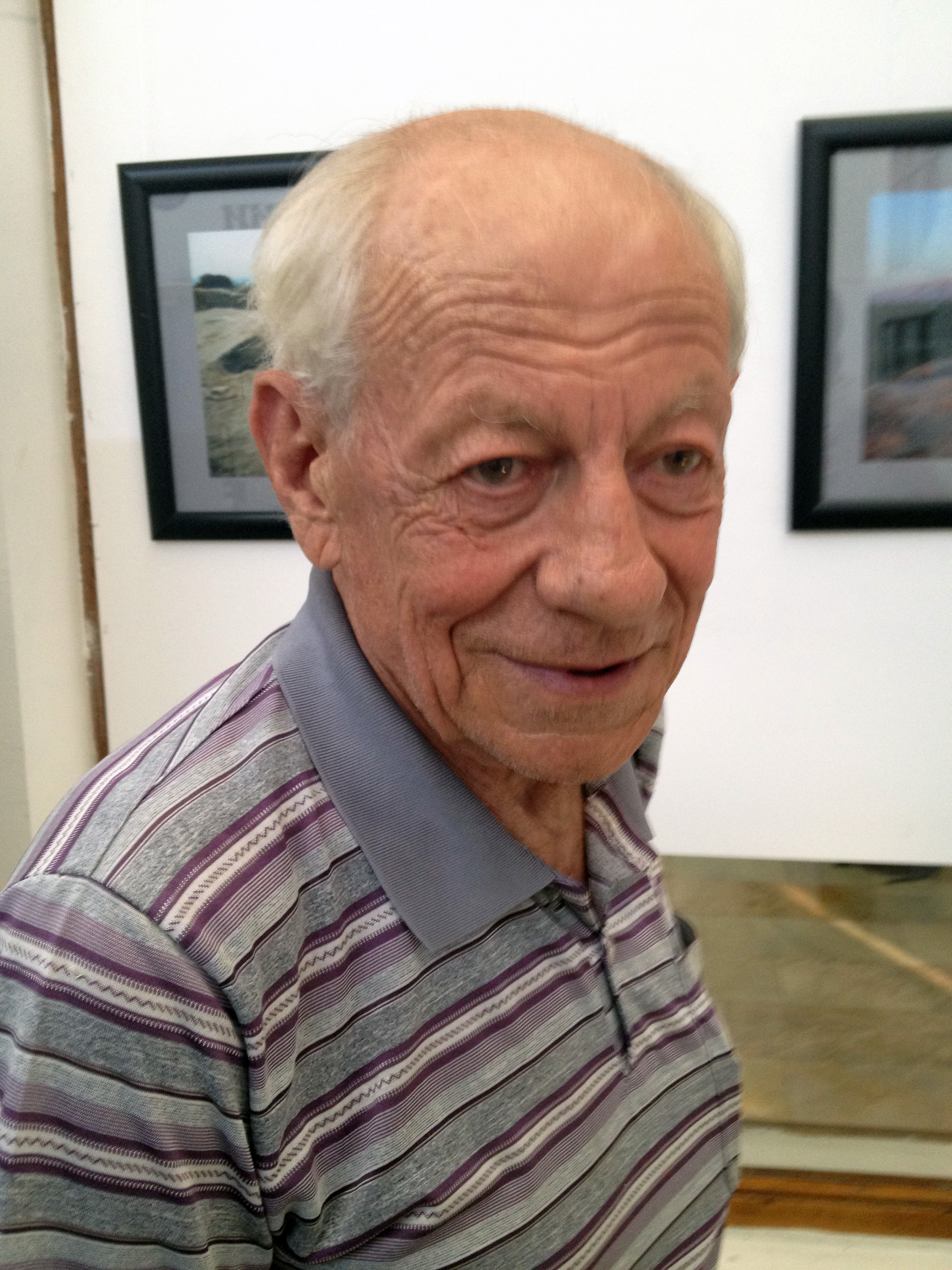
- Born: May 14, 1942; Borjomi, Georgian Soviet Socialist Republic, USSR
- Died: February 10, 2022 (aged 79); Tashkent, Uzbekistan
- Citizenship: Soviet Union → Uzbekistan
- Education: National University of Uzbekistan
- Scientific career
- Fields: archaeology, history, numismatics
- Workplaces: "Institute of Art Studies of the Academy of Sciences of the Republic of Uzbekistan."
- Academic advisors: Mikhail Yevgenyevich Masson, Galina Anatolevna Pugachenkova

Edvard Vasilevich Rtveladze (Georgian: ედუარდ ბასილის ძე რთველაძე; Uzbek: Edvard Vasilyevich Rtveladze; May 14, 1942 – February 10, 2022) was a Soviet, Georgian, and Uzbek scientist. He was a member of the Senate of the Oliy Majlis, Doctor of Historical Sciences, academician from the Academy of Sciences of the Republic of Uzbekistan, and a tenured professor.

== Biography ==
Rtveladze was born on May 14, 1942, in Borjomi, Georgian SSR. He obtained his degree in history and archaeology from the National University of Uzbekistan in 1967. From 1967 to 1969, he served as a laboratory assistant and junior research fellow at the Academy of Sciences of Uzbekistan Institute of Art Studies. He taught at the Tashkent Institute of Theatre and Fine Arts from 1970 to 1973. In 1975, he defended his Ph.D. thesis titled "From the History of urban culture in Northern Caucasia and its Connections with Central Asia" in Leningrad (now St. Petersburg). From 1973 to 1976, he worked as a junior research fellow at the Institute of Art Studies of the Academy of Arts of Uzbekistan. From 1976 to 1985, he held the position of senior research fellow at the Institute of Art Studies within the Academy of Arts of Uzbekistan. He subsequently served as the department chairman at the Institute of Art Studies within the Academy of Arts of Uzbekistan from 1985 to 2009.

== Scientific work ==
Rtveladze has participated in over 80 archaeological expeditions in regions including Central Asia, the Caucasus, Cyprus, France, and Japan. Leading the Tocharistan Expedition, he directed excavations at Kampir Tepe, and under his guidance, collaborative commemorative monographs were produced, shedding light on historical cities in Uzbekistan and figures from the past.

In recognition of his contributions, Rtveladze was honored with the State Hamza Prize in 1985. He achieved the academic title of "Doctor of Historical Sciences" in 1989 and became a professor in 1992. In 1995, he joined the Academy of Sciences of Uzbekistan.

In 2016, Rtveladze and Firdavs Abdukhalikov initiated the "Cultural Heritage of Uzbekistan in World Collections" project, aiming to document and gather historical artifacts, manuscripts, and monuments from Uzbekistan's ancient history, housed in museum collections across the globe. These resources were made accessible to scholars and the general public, with findings compiled into books and encyclopedia articles and discussions held at academic conferences and media forums. The inaugural conference in Tashkent and Samarkand in 2017, marked the establishment of the World Scientific Society for the Study, Preservation, and Popularization of Uzbekistan's Cultural Heritage.

In 2019, Rtveladze made an announcement regarding the possible discovery of the lost Greco-Bactrian city of Alexandria Oxiana, unveiling significant scientific findings at the ancient site of Kampir Tepe.

Rtveladze died in Tashkent, Uzbekistan on 10 February 2022.

== Family ==
Rtveladze was married Lydia Lvovna (1941–2020), the granddaughter of D.D. Bukinich, an archaeologist and archivist who served as the director of the archives in the State Administration for the Preservation and Use of Cultural Heritage Objects in Uzbekistan. Throughout their 50-year marriage, Rtveladze and Lvovna had three children: Anna, Grigory, Nelli.

== Awards ==
- State Prize of the Uzbek SSR (1985)
- Golden Medal and Diploma from the Academy of Sciences of Uzbekistan "For Outstanding Contribution to the Study of Culture" (1999)
- Order of Outstanding Merit (2001)
- Order for Labor Glory (2003)
- State Prize of Uzbekistan in Science and Technology, 2nd Degree (2007)
- Order "El-yurt hurmati" (Honored for Services to the Homeland) (2017)

=== Foreign ===
- Georgia Order of Honor (2001)

== See also ==
- Mikhail Masson
- Ubaydulla Uvatov
