= Oqsaroy =

Oqsaroy Mausoleum
- Uzbek: Oqsaroy
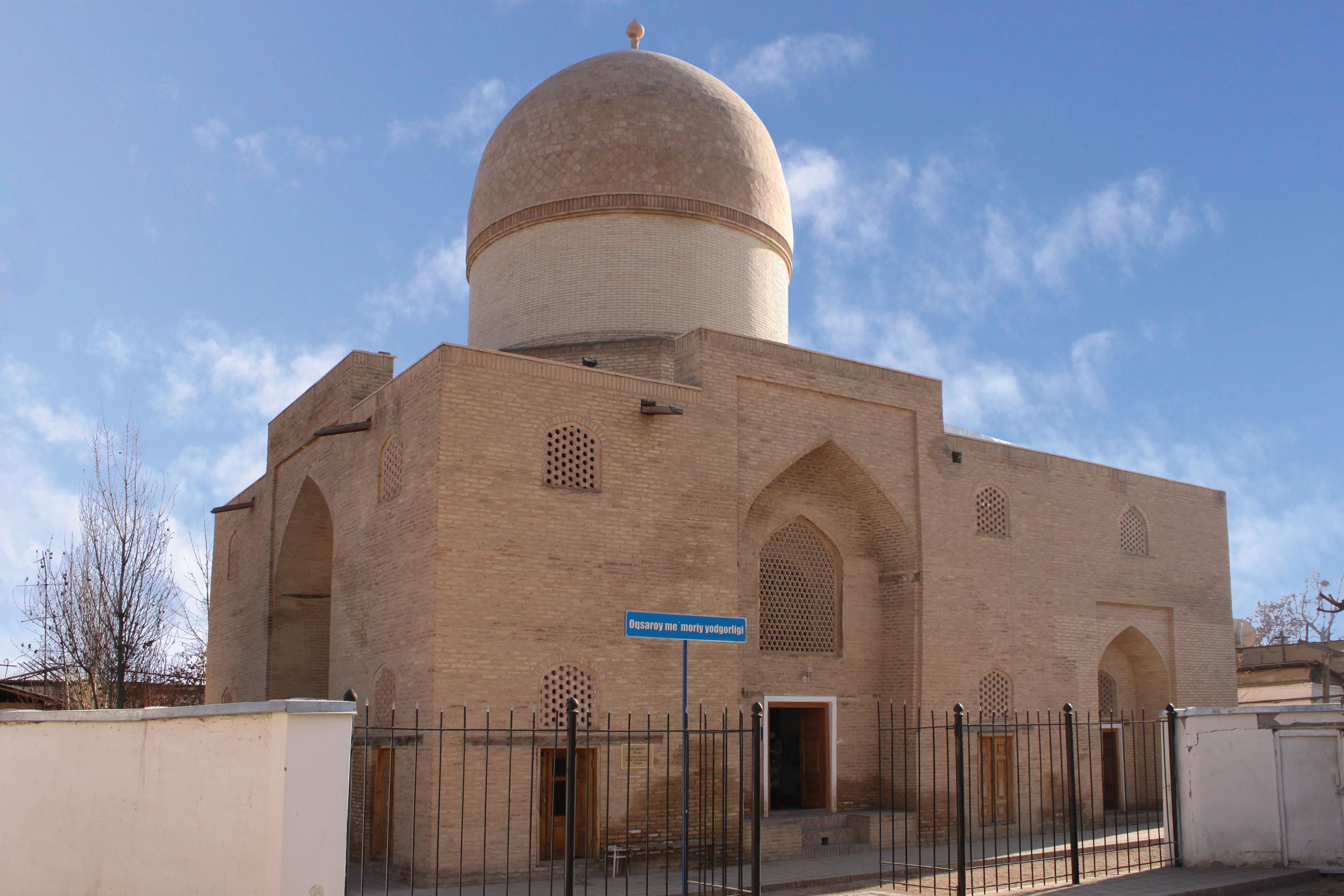
- Oqsaroy, exterior of the building as restored

- Oqsaroy Mausoleum (Uzbekistan)

Location
- Location: Samarkand
- Country: Uzbekistan
- Interactive map of Oqsaroy Mausoleum
- Coordinates: 39°38′53″N 66°58′12″E

Architecture
- Style: Islamic architecture
- Established: 15th century

The Oksaroy or Oqsaroy maqbarasi (Russian: Мавзолей Аксарай; Turkish: Ak Saray or "White Palace") is a fifteenth-century mausoleum in Samarkand, Uzbekistan that served as a burial site for a number of the Timurids. It is located 30 meters southeast of the Gur-e-Amir mausoleum.

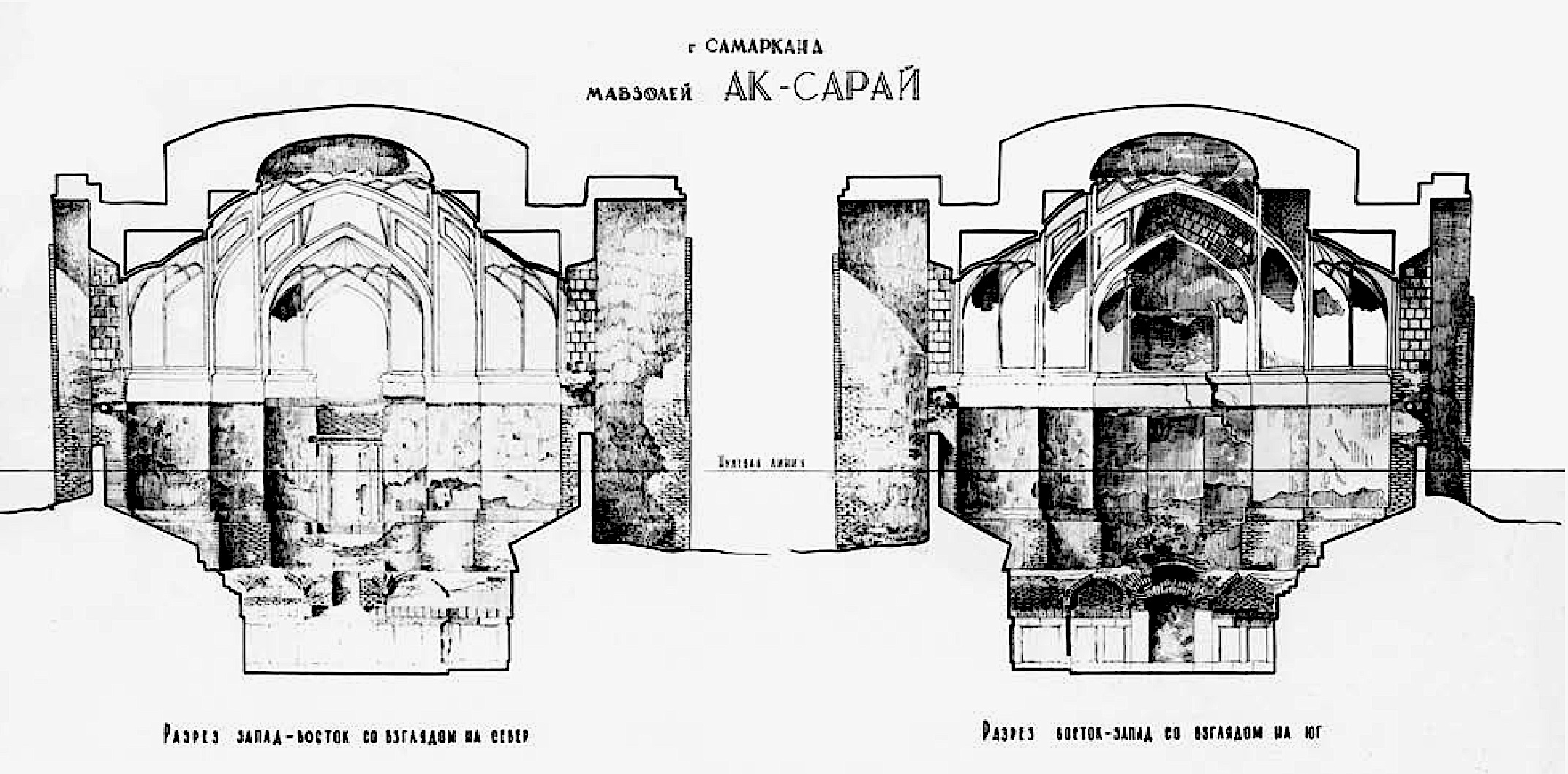
Oksaroy maqbarasi, cross-sections published in 1926 by M. E. Masson.

== History ==
The exact date of construction and original purpose of the Oksaroy mausoleum remains unknown. The prominent Soviet archaeologist and historian Mikhail Masson suggested that the mausoleum was intended for Abdal-Latif Mirza, the ruler of Transoxiana who could not be buried in the Gur-e-Amir mausoleum due to the fact that he gave the order to kill his father Ulugh Beg who was subsequently buried in the Gur-e-Amir. However, the architectural features of the mausoleum and its interior decoration bear similarities to the Ishratkhana Mausoleum, suggesting a construction date in the 1470s. This has prompted the idea that the mausoleum may have served as an ancestral burial vault for the descendants of the family of Sultan Abu Sa'id.

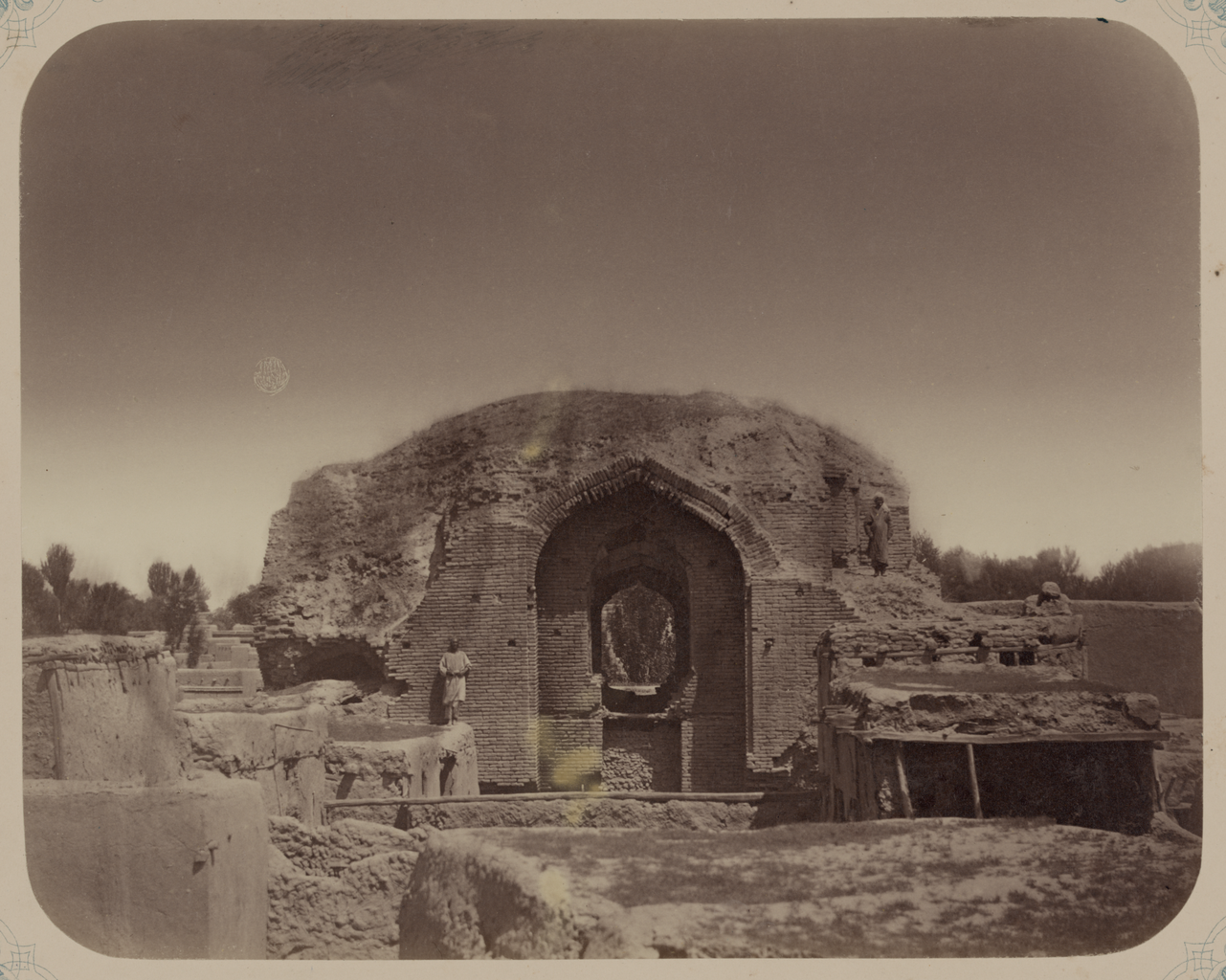
Oqsaroy, as photographed for the Turkestan Album (Туркестанского альбома), a six-volume survey produced in 1871–72.

By the end if the 19th century century, the monument was in a severe state of deterioration when photographed for the Turkestan Album, published in 1871–72. The monument showed further damage when photographed by Ernst Cohn-Wiener in the 1920s. Conservation work was conducted in 1924–1925 with restoration with private funding taking place in 2007.

== Architecture ==
The Oksaroy is a single-domed rectangular structure featuring a cross-shaped main hall and three entrance rooms. The main hall is covered by a dome resting on a high cylindrical drum, the base of which is supported by intersecting arches and pendentives.

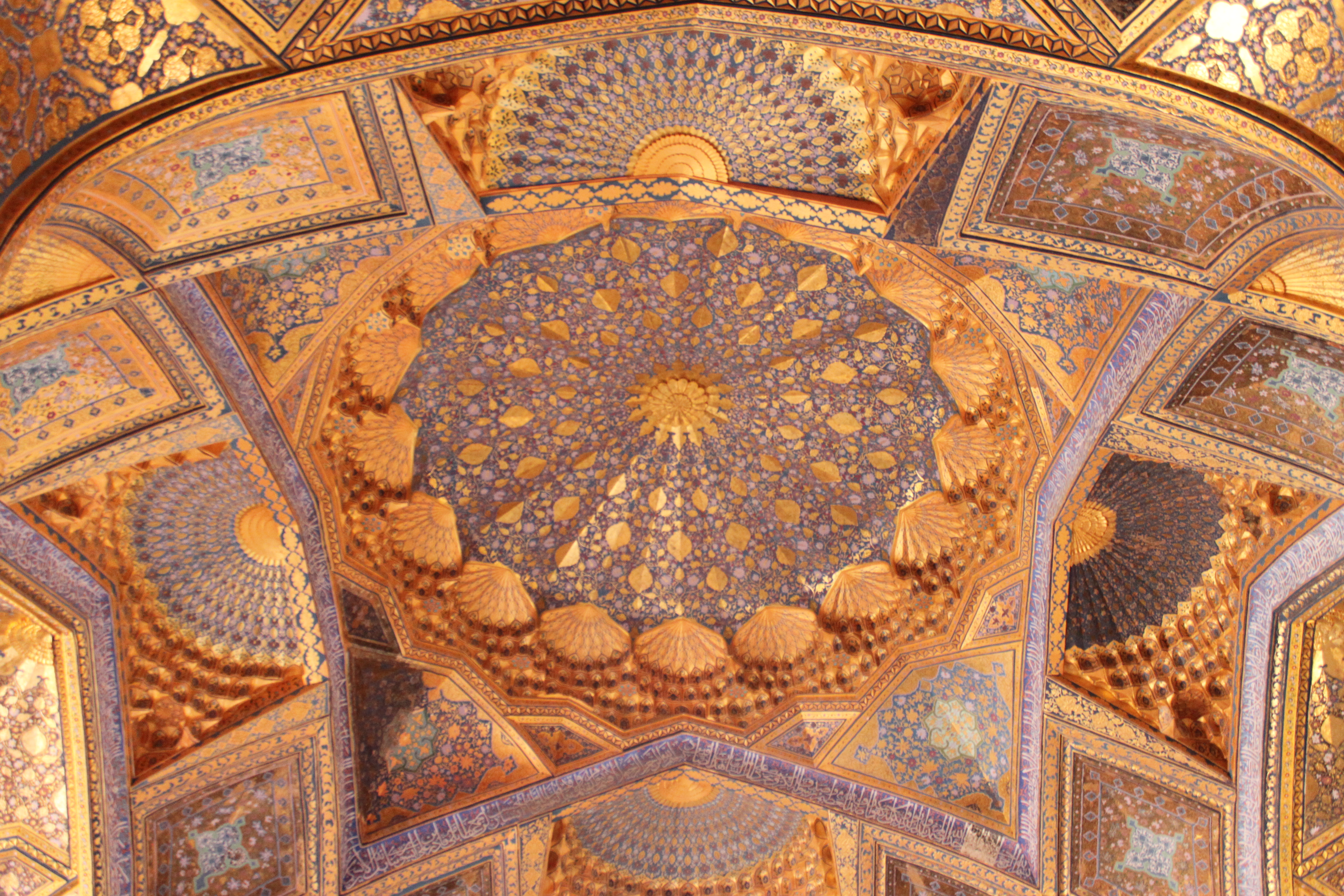
Oqsaroy, interior of the dome as restored.

A narrow a passage leads to a stairway leads giving access to an octagonal crypt lined with marble, containing unidentified burials. The building lacks external architectural decoration, creating a sharp contrast with its rich interior ornamentation.

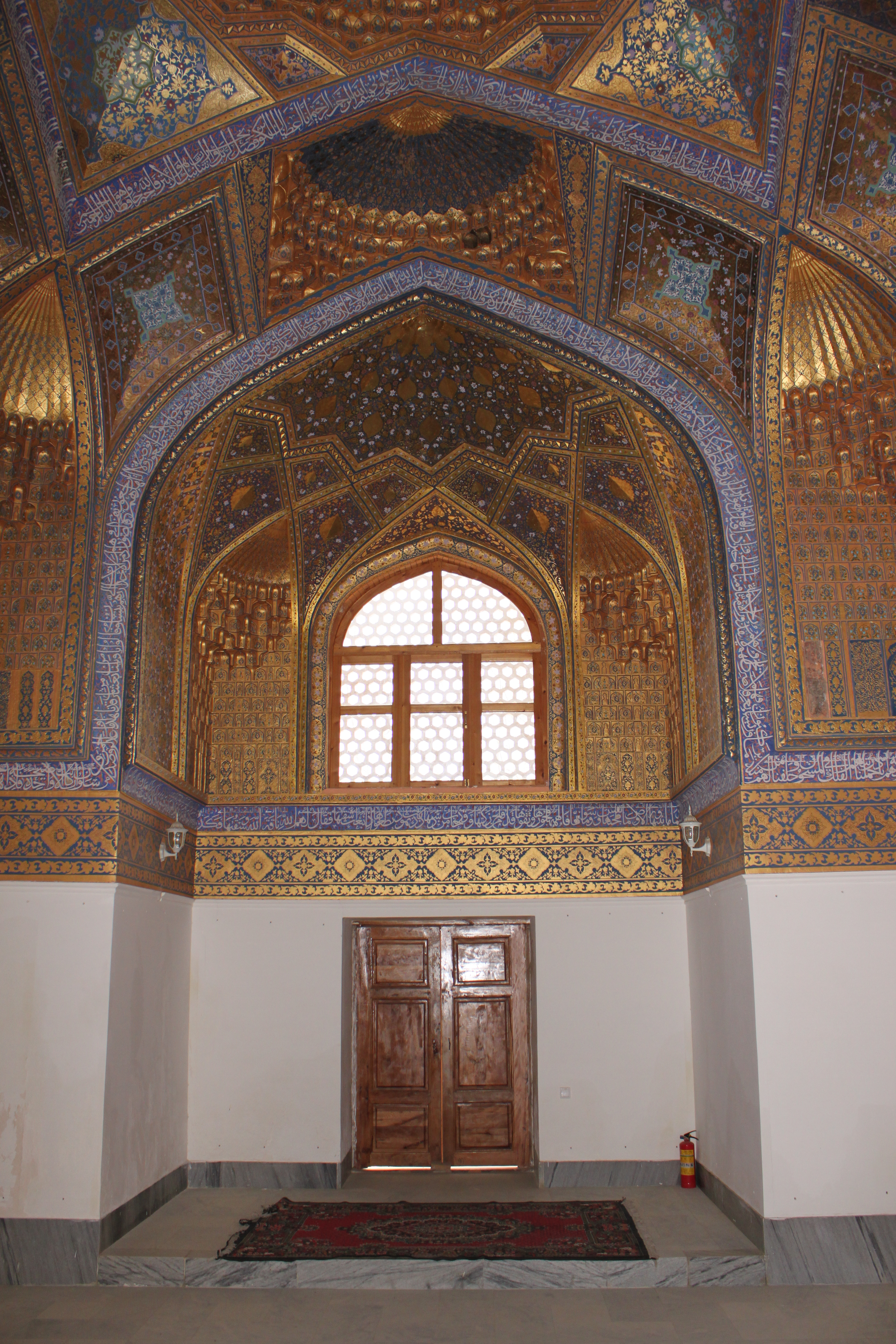
Oqsaroy, interior, showing tile work in the iwan.

The interior features panels of glazed tiles and tile mosaic on a loose silicate base. The walls, pendentives and dome are covered with ornamental paintings executed in the kundal technique—multicolored painting with gilding on a relief pattern base—with abundant use of gilding.

== Bibliography ==
- Pugachenkova, G.A. (1983). Art Monuments of the Soviet Union. Central Asia. Reference Guide. Moscow: Iskusstvo. p. 394.
