= Usmanov =

Usmanov or Usmonov (Russian: Усманов) is a masculine surname, its feminine counterpart is Usmanova or Usmonova. Notable people with the surname include:

- Alexei Usmanov (born 1916), Russian tenor
- Alisher Usmanov (born 1953), Russian businessman
- Imran Usmanov (born 1953), Chechen folk singer
- Irina Viner-Usmanova (born 1948), Russian rhythmic gymnastics coach
- Jamshed Usmonov (born 1965), Tajik film director and producer
- Nilufar Usmanova (born 1987), Uzbek singer and actress
- Rustam Usmonov (born 1977), Tajikistani football player
- Yulduz Usmonova (born 1963), Uzbek singer and actress
- Zafar Usmanov (born 1937), Soviet and Tajik mathematician
- Zamira Ismailovna Usmanova, Uzbek archaeologist

== See also ==
- Haidar Usmonov, a town and jamoat in north-west Tajikistan
