= Mirijanda Mausoleum =

- Mirijanda maqbarasi
- Interactive map of the Mirijanda Mausoleum area
- Alternative names: Miri Janda ota mausoleum
- Etymology: From the name of Abu Hafs Umar ibn Muhammad ibn Abdulloh ibn Shahobuddin Suhravardiy and his garment

General information
- Type: Mausoleum
- Architectural style: Islamic
- Classification: Cultural heritage
- Location: Gulshan MFY Mardtepa village, Guzar district, Uzbekistan
- Coordinates: 38°36′26″N 66°15′09″E
- Named for: Abu Hafs Umar ibn Muhammad ibn Abdulloh ibn Shahobuddin Suhravardiy
- Year built: 5th-6th centuries
- Renovated: 2019
- Owner: Government of Uzbekistan
- Landlord: Kashkadarya regional department of cultural heritage

The Mirijanda Mausoleum (other names: Miri Janda ota mausoleum) is a cultural heritage object located in Uzbekistan. The object was built in the 5th–6th centuries. The mausoleum is located in the Mardtepa village, Gʻuzor District, Kashkadarya region. According to the property rights, it is state property (on the basis of operational management rights of Kashkadarya regional department of cultural heritage). It was included in the national register of intangible cultural heritage objects by the decree of the Cabinet of Ministers of the Republic of Uzbekistan on October 4, 2019 - taken under state protection.

== Naming ==
The name of Miri Janda ota mausoleum is related to the name of a person named Abu Hafs Umar ibn Muhammad ibn Abdulloh ibn Shahobuddin Suhravardiy. He was born in the city of Suhravard, located in the Jabal region of northeastern Iran. Shahobuddin Suhravardiy lived in Baghdad for a long time. Abulqodir G’iyloniy is considered his spiritual mentor. Later he came to Guzar and died there.

Sharafuddin Ali Yazdiy wrote in his work Zafarnoma:

Amir Tarag’ay was devoted to the noble and miraculous Shahobuddin Suhravardiy, the master of Islam, and to the sheikh Shamsiddin Kulol, who was close to him, and he often visited his mausoleum.

Abdulloh ibn Shahobuddin Suhravardiy is considered the father of Sheikh Zayniddin, whose grave is located in the Kokcha cemetery in Tashkent.

The word Janda comes from the name of the garment worn by the Sufi scholar during his diplomatic missions.

== Location ==
According to the famous historian Poyon Ravshanov, the Guzor mosque was located on the left bank of the Guzardarya, 300–400 meters south-west of the fortress. The Old Garden gate of the fortress was opposite the mosque. The road leading from that gate led directly to the Old Garden area. The mausoleum of Amir Jond (or Amir Janda) was located in the north-east of the mosque.
