= Ubaydulla Uvatov =

- Ubaydulla Murodovich Uvatov
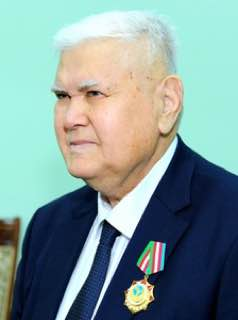
- Ubaydulla Uvatov
- Born: February 23, 1940; Qashqadaryo Region, Guzor district, Uzbek SSR, USSR
- Died: November 3, 2020 (aged 80); Tashkent, Uzbekistan
- Citizenship: Soviet Union → Uzbekistan
- Education: National University of Uzbekistan 1964-1967; International Islamic Academy of Uzbekistan 1999-2008
- Alma mater: Institute of Oriental Studies of the Academy of Sciences of the Republic of Uzbekistan 1967-1970
- Awards: Order of "Mehnat shuhrati" (2009); Honorary title of "Oʻzbekiston Respublikasida xizmat koʻrsatgan yoshlar murabbiysi" (September 27); Order "Fidokorona xizmatlari uchun" (2020)
- Scientific career
- Fields: Oriental, Islamic, source and hadith studies
- Institutions: Administration of the President of the Republic of Uzbekistan; Committee on Religious Affairs of the Republic of Uzbekistan; Institute of Oriental Studies of the Academy of Sciences of the Republic of Uzbekistan; "Amir Temur" international charity fund; "Oltin meros" international charity fund; Tashkent Islamic University; Imam Bukhari International Center; Imam Termizi International Research Center

Ubaydulla Uvatov (February 23, 1940, Guzar district, Qashqadaryo region, Uzbek SSR, USSR – November 3, 2020, Tashkent, Uzbekistan) was a renowned Uzbek Orientalist, historian, Doctor of Historical Sciences, and professor. He extensively researched the history of the Timurid era, Central Asian cultural heritage, scientific studies in manuscriptology, and historiography. He was also the author of many documentary films and theater scripts.

Throughout various periods, he served as a translator, director of the Advisory Department of the President of the Republic of Uzbekistan (1991—1992), first deputy chairman of the Committee on Religious Affairs under the Cabinet of Ministers (1992—1995), leading scientific officer of the Institute of Oriental Studies at the Academy of Sciences of the Republic of Uzbekistan (1995—1997), head of the "Amir Temur" international charity foundation (1997—1999), and the first chairman of the "Oltin Meros" international charity foundation (1999—2000). He also held positions such as head of the Center for Islamic Studies at Tashkent Islamic University and later the Department of Manuscripts of the University (1999—2008), director of the Imam Bukhari International Center (2008—2013), and until his passing, the director of the Imam Termez International Scientific Research Center (2013—2020).

He was honored with the honorary title " "Oʻzbekiston Respublikasida xizmat koʻrsatgan yoshlar murabbiysi, as well as the orders "Mehnat shuhrati" and "Fidokorona xizmatlari uchun". Additionally, a special scholarship in the name of the scholar was established for academy students by the International Islamic Academy of Uzbekistan.

Following Ubaydulla Uvatov's passing, a secondary school in the Guzar district and two streets in the same region were named in his honor. Academic sessions, memorial events, and knowledge-sharing gatherings have been organized at the International Islamic Academy of Uzbekistan to commemorate his legacy and contributions.

== Early life ==
Ubaydulla Uvatov was born on February 23, 1940, in the Chuchuk ota hamlet of Pachkamar village, Guzar district, Qashqadaryo region. From 1958 to 1964, he studied Arabic Philology at the Faculty of Oriental Studies at Tashkent State University and began working as a teacher at the university in 1964. Between 1967 and 1970, he pursued postgraduate studies at the Institute of Oriental Studies of the Academy of Sciences of the Republic of Uzbekistan. He died on November 3, 2020, at the age of 80 and was buried at the Said Vaqqos father's cemetery in Tashkent.

== Career ==
Uvatov initially worked as an Arabic language interpreter in the Arab Republic of Egypt from 1962 to 1963, followed by a teaching position at Tashkent State University from 1964 to 1966. He also served as an interpreter in Iraq from 1966 to 1967 and again from 1975 to 1978. Additionally, he carried out his duties as an interpreter in the Libyan People's Republic from 1982 to 1985. Between 1991 and 1992, he held the position of Director of the Consultative Sector of the Office of the President of the Republic of Uzbekistan, and from 1992 to 1995, he served as the first Deputy Chairman of the Committee on Religious Affairs under the Cabinet of Ministers of the Republic of Uzbekistan.

From 1995 to 1997, he worked as a leading scientific officer at the Institute of Oriental Studies of the Academy of Sciences of the Republic of Uzbekistan, later becoming the first chairman of the "Amir Temur" international charity foundation from 1997 to 1999 and the "Oltin Meros" international charity foundation from 1999 to 2000. Between 1999 and 2008, he served as the director of the Center for Islamic Studies at Tashkent Islamic University, and later as the head of the Department of Manuscripts of the university. From 2008 to 2013, he was the leader of the Imam Bukhari International Center. Subsequently, from 2014 to 2020, he was the head of the Uzbekistan Society of Scholars and from 2017 to 2020, the director of the Imam Termez International Scientific Research Center. Furthermore, he held the position of a professor at the "Islamic Civilization Studies ICESCO" department of the International Islamic Academy of Uzbekistan.

Moreover, he was a permanent member of the specialized council of the International Islamic Academy of Uzbekistan and a member of the editorial board of the "Islom nuri" newspaper and the editorial board of the "Imom Buxoriy saboqlari" journal.

== Scientific activity ==
His scholarly activity primarily focused on the history of the Timurid era, the scientific assembly of Central Asian scholars, orientalism, and hadith studies. Uvatov was proficient in Arabic, Persian, Russian, and French languages. In 1974, on April 12, he defended his candidacy dissertation in philological sciences, supporting the translation and scholarly analysis of Ibn Arabshah's work "Ajoib al-maqdur fi tarixi Taymur" ("Marvels of Destiny in Timur's History"), earning him a candidate of philological sciences degree. On June 16, 2002, at Tashkent Islamic University, he defended his doctoral dissertation on the development of hadith studies in Transoxiana and Khurasan scholars (Bukhari, Muslim, Termizi), obtaining a doctorate in historical sciences. He was awarded the title of professor in 2008.

Throughout his academic career, Ubaydulla Uvatov authored over 300 articles, nearly 50 books, and monographs. The majority of his scholarly works have been published in Russian, Arabic, Turkish, and Turkic languages in countries such as Egypt, Russia, Turkey, Saudi Arabia, Kazakhstan, and Kyrgyzstan.

== Scenarios ==
Ubaydulla Uvatov is the author of the script for the documentary film "Fasohat ilmining sultoni" about Mahmud al-Zamakhshari (2014), the documentary film "Hakim Termiziy" (2017), and the play "Allomai zamon" (2019).

== Awards ==
- Order of "Mehnat shuhrati" (2009)
- Honorary title of "Oʻzbekiston Respublikasida xizmat koʻrsatgan yoshlar murabbiysi" (September 27)
- Order "Fidokorona xizmatlari uchun" (2020).

== Memory ==
In February 2021, on the occasion of Ubaydulla Uvatov's 81st birthday, a commemorative event and a spiritual-enlightening gathering were organized at the 1st Secondary School in Guzor district under the theme "Living with Memory, Walking with Respect." During the event, it was announced that the school where the scholar received his education and the streets Elhaqi and Chorvadorlar in the district would be named after Ubaydulla Uvatov. On February 23, 2021, a scientific-practical conference titled "Ubaydulla Uvatov - Luminary in Oriental Studies and Hadith Studies" was held at the Uzbekistan International Islamic Academy. Additionally, the Uzbekistan International Islamic Academy established a special scholarship named after Ubaydulla Uvatov for academy students.
