= Kampir Tepe =

Archaeological site in Uzbekistan

Coordinates: 37.4105°N 67.0282°E

Kampir Tepe

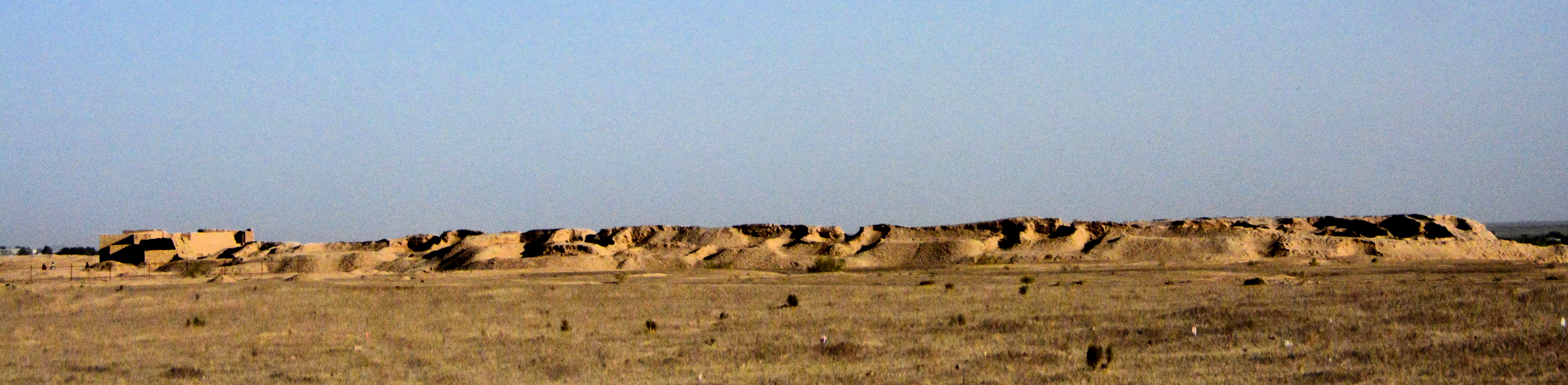
Ruins of the fortress of Kampir Tepe

Location of Kampir Tepe
Kampir Tepe (Uzbekistan)
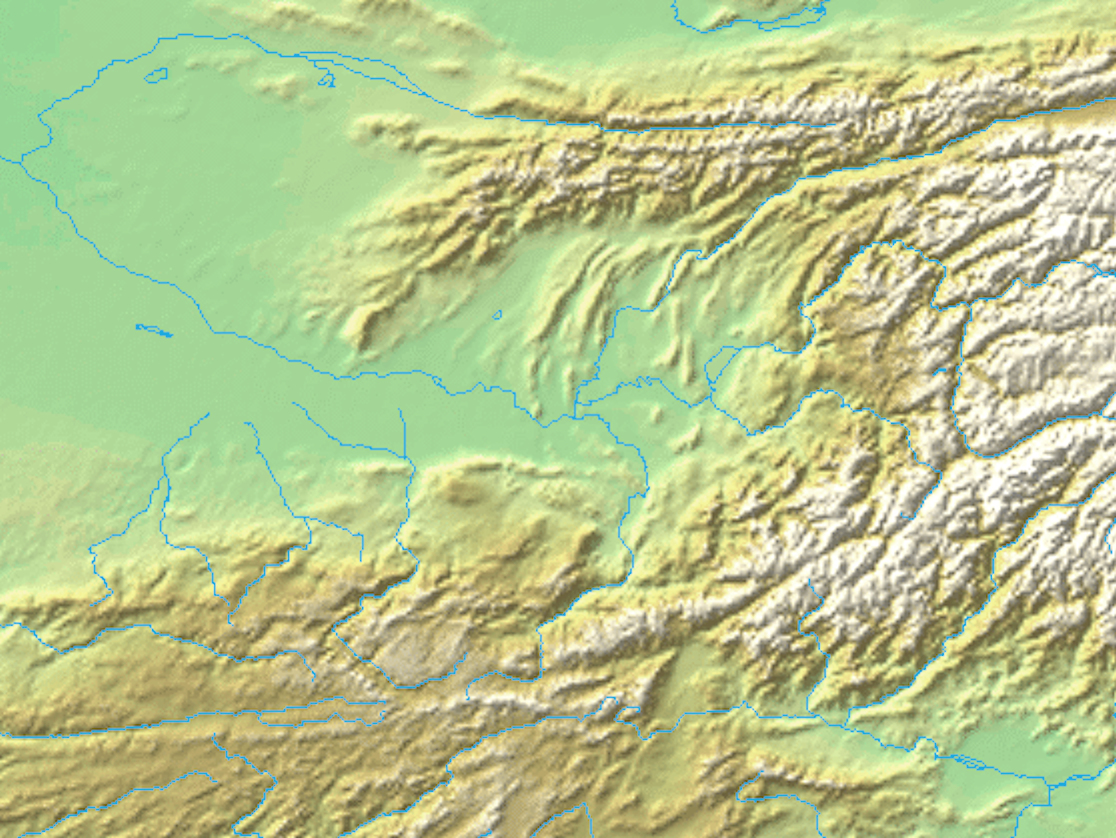
Kampir Tepe (Bactria)

Kampir Tepe (Uzbek: Kampirtepa) is an archaeological site located within the Surxondaryo Region of Uzbekistan, near the village Shoʻrob, northwest of the city of Termez. It is thought to be the lost city of Alexandria on the Oxus described by Ptolemy, though the Amu Darya river (known in antiquity as the Oxus) has now changed its course. The Telegraph newspaper describes Kampir Tepe as “the Pompeii of Central Asia.”

== Discovery ==
Kampir Tepe was first discovered in 1972 by archeologist Edvard Rtveladze during a survey of the Amu Darya river bank. Excavations began in 1977, initially led by Galina Pugachenkova. The first dig was in the southern part of the citadel and a western suburb of Kampir Tepe. The majority of finds were from the reign of the Kushan Emperor Kanishka in the 2nd century AD, and it was one of the most complete Kushan era settlements ever found The ruins which are currently visible belong to the fortifications built by the Kushans in the 1st-2nd century CE, on top of an earlier Hellenistic plan dating to the 4th century BC.

There was evidence of older layers below, which warranted further investigation. The large-scale study of Kampir Tepe’s Hellenistic layers began in 2000 with the establishment of the Tokharistan Archaeological Expedition (TAE), led by Edvard Rtveladze. These excavations were held jointly with scientists from France, India, and Japan. They identified three distinct periods of development at Kampir Tepe, the earliest of which began in the 4th century BC.

Excavations at Kampir Tepe are ongoing, but by August 2019 Rtveladze had amassed enough evidence to announce that Kampir Tepe was the same site described by Ptolemy as Alexandria on the Oxus. This claim was previously made by archeologists excavating Ai Khanum in Afghanistan, but Kampir Tepe is another possible location.

== History ==
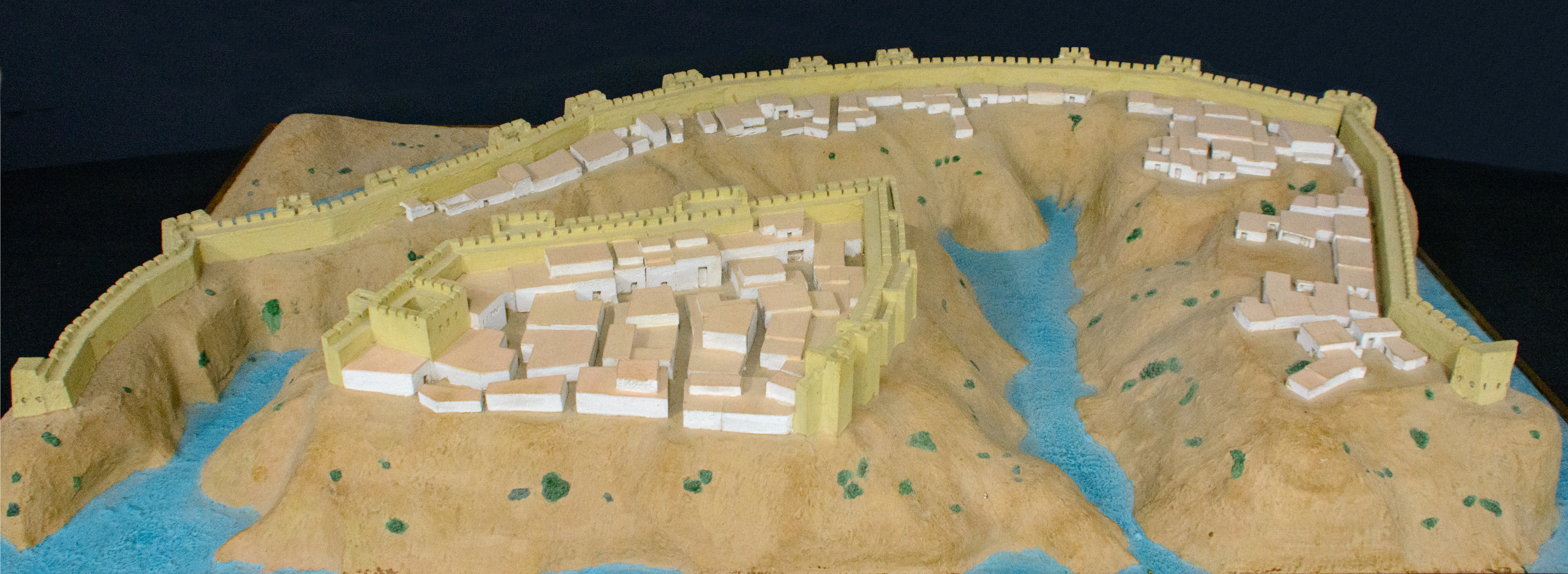
Reconstruction of Kampyr Tepe (Alexandria Oxiana) end 4th cent BCE-1st cent CE. Termez Archaeological Museum.

Kampir Tepe was built in three phases: Hellenistic, Saka-Parthian, and Kushan.

Construction of the earliest part of the site began in the 4th century BC and included foundations and the fortress. It coincided with Alexander the Great’s invasion of Central Asia, during which Alexander built numerous fortresses and cities. Evidence that Kampir Tepe is the same city described by Ptolemy includes not only the dating of the site, but also cartographic evidence, the design of gates, which are an exact architectural match with those discovered in Greece and Turkey; and the discovery of a new coin depicting Apollo.

In stage 2 (235-200 BC), the fortress was reconstructed. New defensive walls were built, each 4m thick, and two square mud brick towers were added. The dating of this period of the city is clear from coin finds linked to the reign of the Greco-Bactrian king Euthydemus I (230-200 BC).

The third period of construction was towards the end of the 2nd century BC. Evidence for this chronology comes from a combination of written sources, and archaeological-stratigraphic and numismatic data.

In total, Kampir Tepe was occupied for approximately 400 years. The course of the river then changed, and the inhabitants had to move.

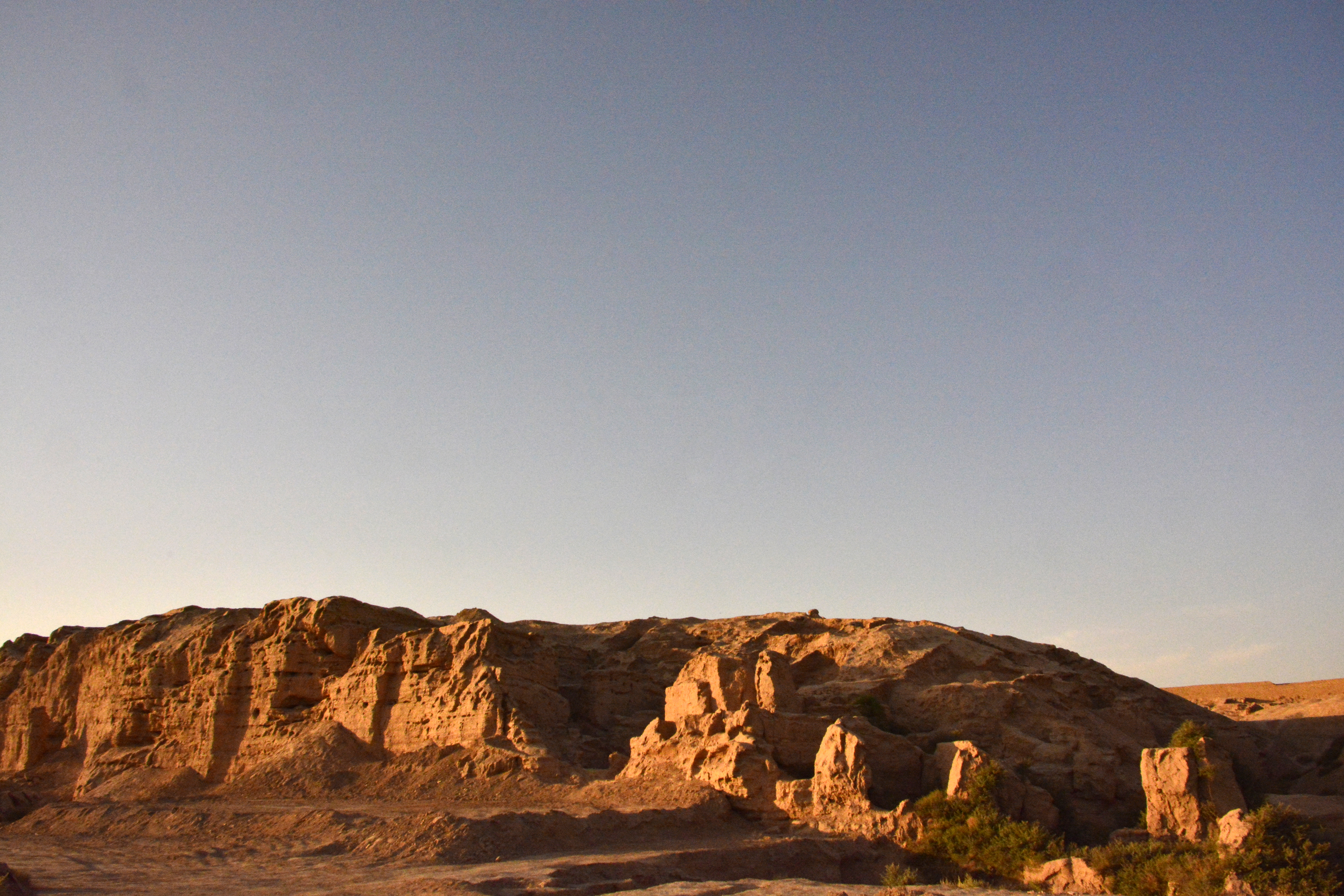
Kampir Tepe Archeological site, Uzbekistan

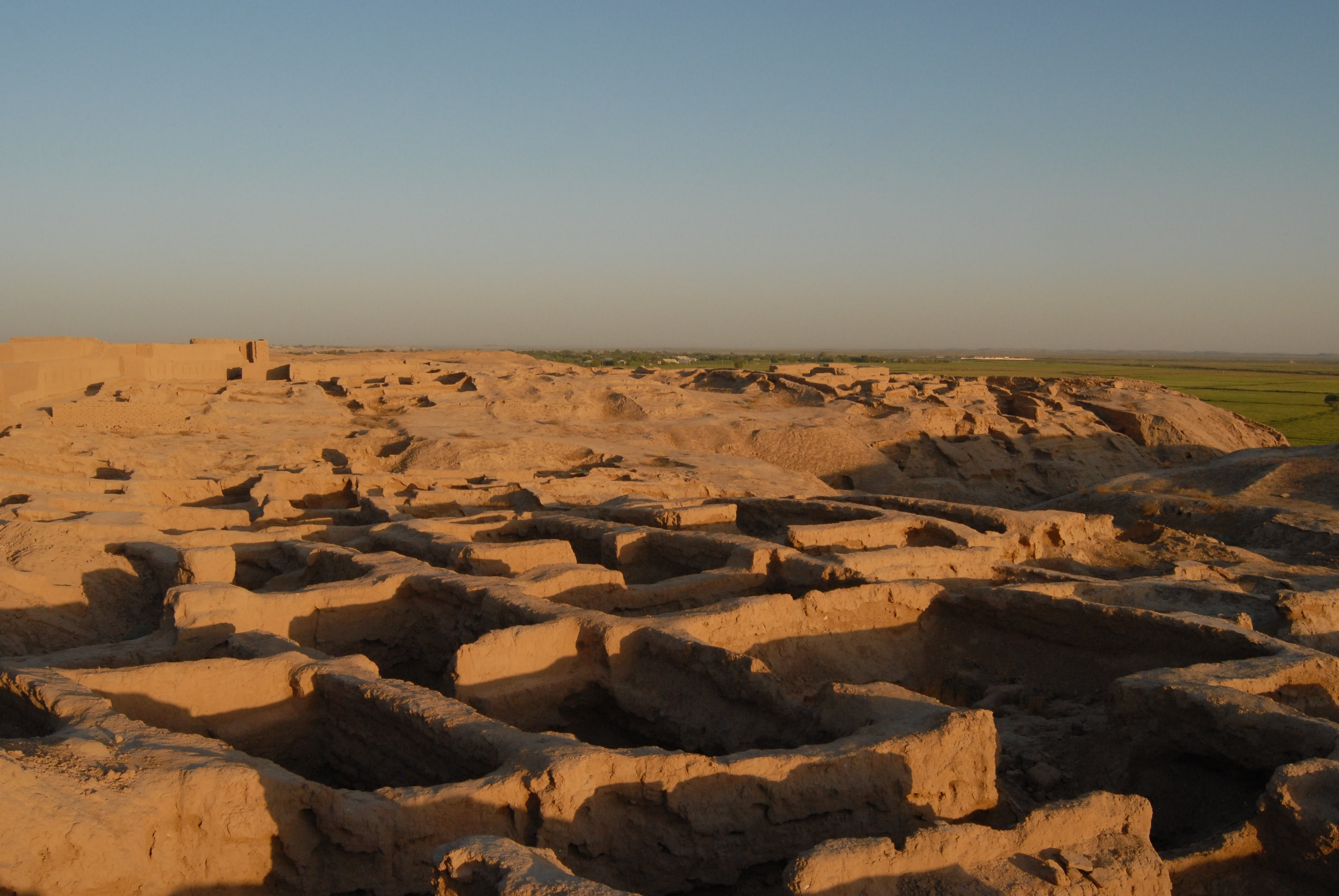
Ruins of Kampir Tepe

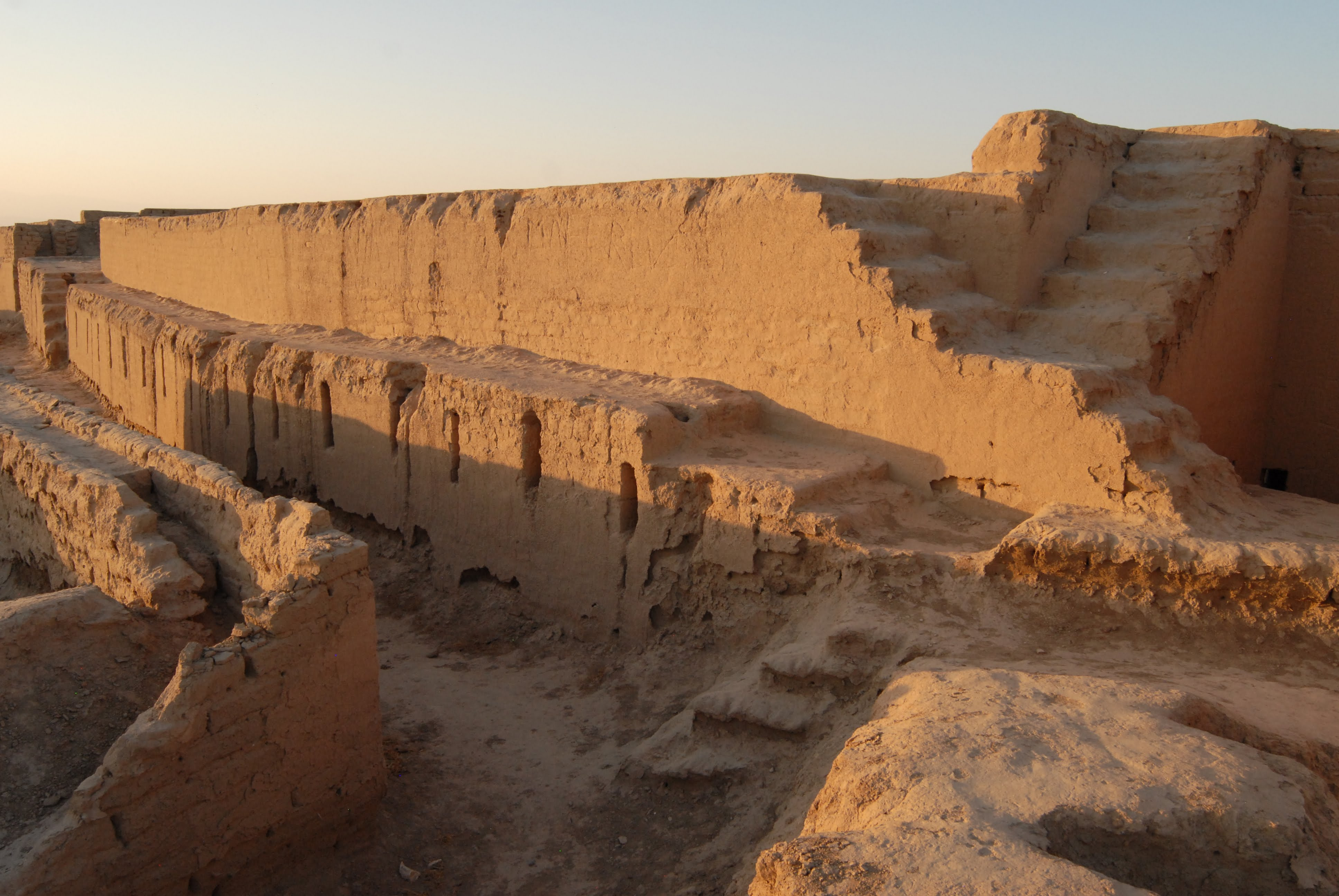
Kampir Tepe archeological site

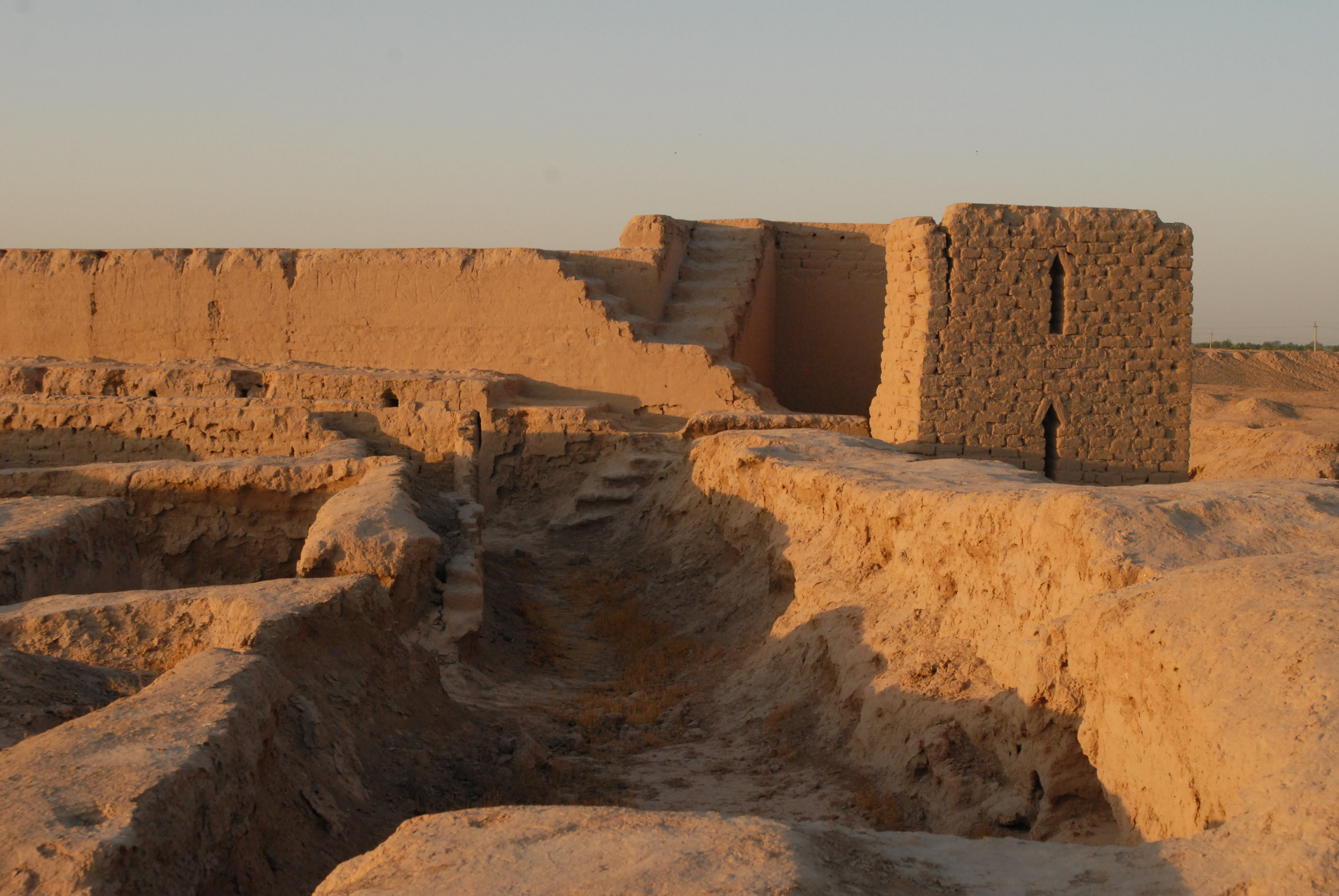
Kampir Tepe archeological site, Uzbekistan

== Architecture ==
Kampir Tepe was a mud brick city built on an artificial terrace above a river port on the Amu Darya. There was a lighthouse on the edge of the harbour to guide ships across the river.

The fortress was constructed from rectangular mud bricks. The fortress walls were intersected with rounded towers and gatehouses. The southwest gate complex was built to the same design as the one at Sillyum, Pamphylia, which Alexander besieged in 333 BC. The semi-oval courtyard was common in Pamphylia but has not been recorded elsewhere.

Kampir Tepe’s sanctuary is on a second artificial terrace. It is in the shape of an irregular triangle surrounded by mud brick walls. Seven structures originally thought to be ceramic furnaces were covered by a single false vault. These were two-part altars used to burn sacred plants. They are similar to those found in the temple of Demeter and Kore in Eleusis.

== Artefacts ==
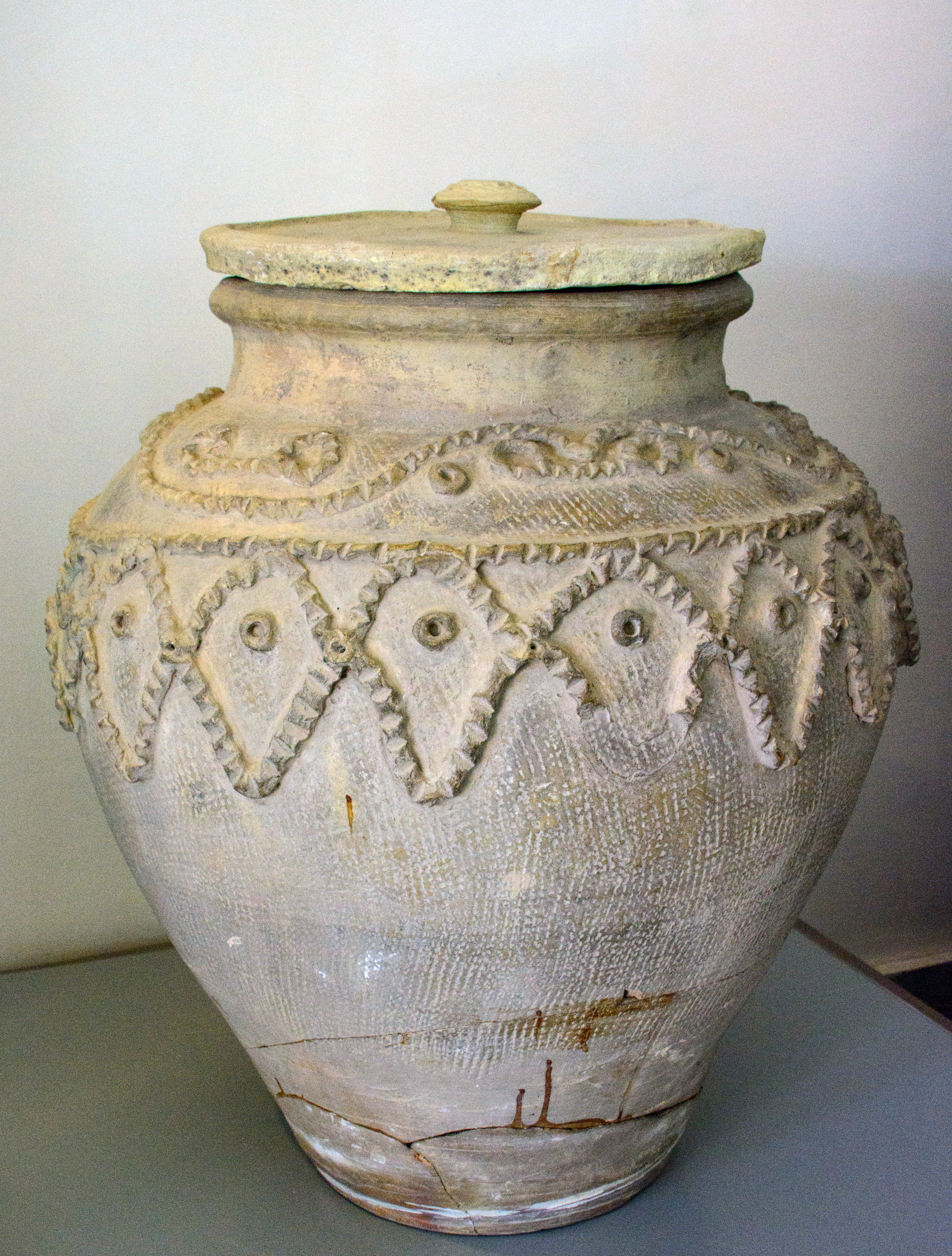
Kampyr Tepe (Alexandria Oxiana) end 4th cent BCE-1st cent CE Hellenistic Port Storage Pot.

Excavation of a terraced house in the southeast part of Kampir Tepe revealed a pit filled with moulds for early Hellenistic vessels. It is thought that these were ritual items placed here during a sacrifice to the gods. Larger pieces of pottery are also still visible at the site

Many coins have been found at Kampir Tepe. The earliest of these depict the Greek god Apollo, and there are more from the reign of Euthydemus I. Statuettes of Greek soldiers were also found in Kampir Tepe.
