= Zamira Usmanova =

Archaeologist

Zamira Ismailovna Usmanova is an Uzbek archaeologist and the first woman to graduate from the National University of Uzbekistan's Department of Archaeology. One of few female archaeologists in Central Asia, her works and research allowed for the dating of the city of Merv, Erk-Kala. She has published about 150 scientific publications on archaeology and the history of art of Central Asia.

== Early life ==
Usmanova was born in Samarkand. She lived with her family in Turkmenistan, but the family moved to Tashkent after the Ashgabat earthquake in 1948.

== Education and career ==
Usmanova graduated from Tashkent in 1950 before enrolling in Tashkent State University's Faculty of History and Archaeology under Mikhail Evgenievich Masson. During her studies, she was an active member of the Scientific Circle and together with Svetlana Lunina, commissioned by Masson, she examined several monuments in the Tashkent region whose results have been published. She also participated in archaeological excavations organized by the South Turkmenistan Multi-Disciplinary Archaeological Expedition (YuTAKE), led by Masson.

Following the success of her postgraduate studies, she was hired as a teacher where she taught courses on history, archaeology, and Eastern studies. As a teacher, Usmanova trained international students from Africa and the Middle East to promote and enhance knowledge of the archaeology of Uzbekistan, Central Asia, and the Caucasus.

Usmanova engaged in research work regarding historical printing in Shakhrisabz houses and archaeological sites in the Kesh region. With YuTAKE, she investigated the archaeology of the ancient settlement of Merv, Erk-Kala, which became the subject of her thesis in 1969.

From 1981 to 1992, she was the chair of the Department of Archaeology of Central Asia at Tashkent State University. During her leadership at the Department of Archaeology, Usmanova and her team undertook excavations on the site of Erk-Kala, revealing the ancient urbanization of Merv and establishing its age. For this achievement, UNESCO recognized Usmanova alongside Uzbek archaeologist Galina Pugachenkova.

In the 1990s, Usmanova led several excavations to determine the age of Shakhrisabz, the birthplace of Amir Temur. In 1997, the Kesh region became a subject of study from the late Bronze Age and early Iron Age. As a result of the archaeological material discovered and its identification as the historical city of Kesh, the age of the city was determined and, in 2002, its 2700th anniversary was celebrated.

Usmanova worked in the Department of History at Tashkent State University from until her retirement in 1996. Although she is retired, she still participates in scientific conferences.

== Selected publications ==
- Z. I. Usmanova. The study of the walls and the Buddhist monument in Merv. Collection of scientific works of Tashkent State University. Issue 517. Tashkent, 1976.
- Z. I. Usmanova. The historical topography of Shakhrisabz in the light of new data. Scientific works of Tashkent State University, issue 533, Tashkent, 1977.
- Z. I. Usmanova and I. Akhrarov. New data on the history of Bukhara. History and archeology of Central Asia. Ashkhabad, 1978.
- Z. I. Usmanova and A. S. Sagdullaev. Toward the study of monuments of the Yakkabag region. Materials on history, historiography and archeology. Sat scientific works of Tashkent State University. Ne 583. Tashkent, 1981.
- Z. I. Usmanova. The work of the Department of Archeology of Tashkent State University on the archaeological study of the city of Ahsiket. Materials on the archeology of Central Asia. Sat scientific works. Ne 707. Tashkent, 1983.
- Z. I. Usmanova and G. A. Koshelenko and M. I. Filanovich. Margiana. Archeology of the USSR. The oldest states of the Caucasus and Central Asia. Science, 1985.
