= Abdulla A'zamov =

Uzbekistan physician and academic

Abdulla Aʼzamov
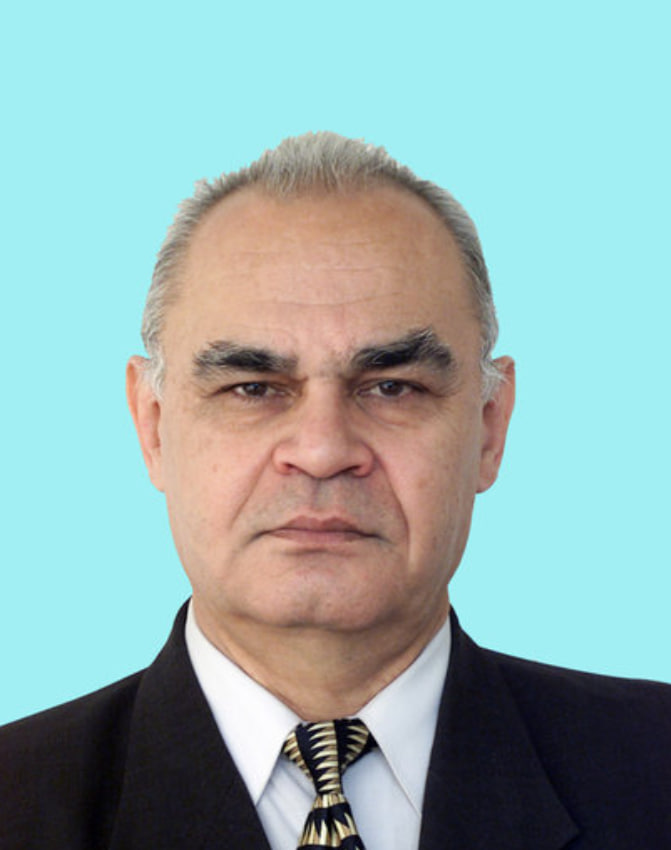
- Abdulla Aʼzamov in 2017
- Born: April 21, 1947 (age 79); Baliqchi, Andijon, Uzbek SSR
- Citizenship: Uzbekistan
- Education: Tashkent State University, Moscow State University
- Known for: Differential equations, mathematical analysis, mathematical education
- Awards: People’s Education Award, International Bobur Prize, Order of Labor Glory, Honored Scientist of the Republic of Uzbekistan
- Scientific career
- Fields: Mathematics
- Institutions: Namangan State University, National University of Uzbekistan, Moscow State University
- Thesis: On the theory of differential equations with deviating argument (1974)

Abdulla Aʼzamovich Aʼzamov (born April 21, 1947) is a Soviet and Uzbek doctor of physical and mathematical sciences (1987), professor, member of the Academy of Sciences of Uzbekistan (2013), president of the Uzbek Mathematical Society (2013), vice-president of TWMS (Turkic World Mathematical Society) (2017). He is the recipient of the "People's Education Hero" medal, the International Babur Award (2015), the "Order of Labor Glory" (2016) and the honorary title of "Scientist of the Republic of Uzbekistan".

He was a member of the jury of the republic mathematics olympiad since 1973, and a member of the jury of the former union mathematics olympiad from 1989 to 1991. He defended his candidate dissertation at the Council of the Faculty of Mathematics of Tashkent State University in 1974, and his doctoral dissertation at the Special Council of the Faculty of Mathematics and Mechanics of St. Petersburg State University in 1987. Aʼzamov was awarded the title of associate professor in 1981 and professor in 1989.

He has been a member of the Uzbekistan Writers' Union since 2013. He became an academician of the Academy of Sciences of the Republic of Uzbekistan in 2017. He worked as a senior editor at the "Uzbek Soviet Encyclopedia" main editorial office from 1972 to 1975 (on a part-time basis), as a deputy editor-in-chief of the "Tafakkur" journal from 1999 to 2000, and as a responsible employee at the Office of the President of the Republic of Uzbekistan from 2000 to 2011.

== Biography ==
Abdulla Aʼzamov was born on April 21, 1947, in Baliqchi District of Andijan Region. He is an Uzbek by nationality. He studied at the 1st secondary school of his native district from 1953 to 1964. He participated in the external olympiad organized by the "Young Leninist" newspaper in 1963. He graduated from secondary school with a gold medal in 1964 and entered the Faculty of Mechanics and Mathematics of Tashkent State University (now Mirzo Ulugbek National University of Uzbekistan). He was sent to study at the Moscow State University named after M. V. Lomonosov with a group of students in 1966. He graduated in 1970.

== Activities ==
Abdulla Aʼzamov started lecturing on differential equations in 1971–1972 academic year. He worked as a senior editor at the "Uzbek Soviet Encyclopedia" main editorial office from 1972 to 1975 (on a part-time basis). He was a member of the jury of the Uzbek SSR mathematics olympiad since 1973, and a member of the jury of the former union mathematics olympiad from 1989 to 1991. He was admitted to the position of assistant at the Department of Mathematical Analysis of Tashkent State University, and worked as an associate professor, professor and head of the Department of Differential Equations from 1980 to 1993. He was appointed as the dean of the Faculty of Mathematics in 1992–1993. Aʼzamov was appointed as the rector of Namangan State University in 1993. He worked as the head of the department of secondary and vocational education at the Ministry of Higher and Secondary Specialized Education from 1998 to 1999, as the deputy editor-in-chief of the "Tafakkur" journal from 1999 to 2000, and as a responsible employee at the Office of the President of the Republic of Uzbekistan from 2000 to 2011.

He defended his candidate dissertation at the Council of the Faculty of Mathematics of Tashkent State University in 1974, and his doctoral dissertation at the Special Council of the Faculty of Mathematics and Mechanics of St. Petersburg State University in 1987. He was awarded the title of associate professor in 1981 and professor in 1989. His work “Munojatnoma” is devoted to the scientific-historical analysis of Alisher Navoi's ghazals. He wrote the play “Where is Usmon Nosir?” during his tenure as the rector of Namangan State University and the work was staged at the regional theater. He led the Namangan branch of the Academy of Sciences of Uzbekistan from 1993 to 1997.

Aʼzamov lectured at the National University of Uzbekistan and the Tashkent branch of Moscow State University. He became a member of the Uzbekistan Writers’ Union in 2013 and was elected as the president of the Uzbek Mathematical Society. He is the vice-president of the Turkic World Mathematical Society (2017) and an academician of the Academy of Sciences of the Republic of Uzbekistan since 2017.

== Family ==
Aʼzamov has two sons and a daughter.

== Books ==
- Abdulla Aʼzamov (2018). Taqvim jadvali. Hijriy va milodiy taqvimlarda sanalarni kunma-kun o‘girish jadvallari. Toshkent: G‘afur G‘ulom. p. 436. ISBN 978-9943-03-992-6.
- Abdulla Aʼzamov (2017). Differential Equations and Dynamical Systems. Urganch.

=== Scientific articles ===
- Abdulla Aʼzamov (2021). Existence and uniqueness theorems for the Pfaff equation with continuous coefficients.
- Abdulla Aʼzamov (2021). An existence theorem and an approximate solution method for the Pfaff equation with continuous coefficients.
- Abdulla Aʼzamov (2020). A pursuit-evasion differential game with slow pursuers on the edge graph of simplexes.
- Abdulla Aʼzamov (2020). Four-dimensional brusselator model with periodical solution.
- Abdulla Aʼzamov (2019). The pursuit-evasion game on the 1-skeleton graph of the regular polyhedron.
- Abdulla Aʼzamov (2019). On the Сhernous’ko time-optimal problem for the equation of heat conductivity in a rod.
- Abdulla Aʼzamov (2018). On generators of a matrix algebra and some of its subalgebras.

== Bibliography ==
- Ummatov R (2022). Gʻaznai Namangon/ Encyclopedia (3 volume) 1st book/ Oltin odamlar. Toshkent: „Sharq“. p. 448.
