= Elyor Karimov =

Uzbekistani academic

- Born: 10 February 1964 (age 62); Tashkent, USSR
- Education: Tashkent State University
- Awards: 2009 Fellowship at the Woodrow Wilson International Center for Scholars
- Scientific career
- Fields: Islamic Studies, Central Eurasian Studies, Diplomatics
- Workplaces: Academy of Sciences of Uzbekistan

Elyor E. Karimov (Uzbek: Elyor Erikovich Karimov, Russian: Эльёр Эрикович Каримов, Karimov, Ė. Ė. (Ėlʹër Ėrikovich); born 10 February 1964) is an Uzbekistani orientalist and scholar of Islamic, Central Eurasian Studies and Diplomatics.

== Academic career ==
Elyor Karimov graduated from the Tashkent State University (Faculty of Oriental Studies) in 1986. He is a holder of a graduate degree in History and Area Studies (1986) and Ph.D. (1990) in Medieval History ('"Role, place and social positions of clergy of Maverannahr in 15th century") and a Habilitation/Postdoctoral Studies (1998) in History of Islam in Central Asia ("Sufi tariqats in Central Asia of 12th – 15th centuries").

Since 1986 Karimov has worked in the Academy of Sciences of Uzbekistan. He has been head of Department of Medieval History at the Academy of Sciences of Uzbekistan since 1998. He was elected a chairman of Uzbek National Society of Young Scholars in 1999. He received a residential fellowship at the Woodrow Wilson International Center for Scholars in 2009.

Elyor Karimov has collaborated with UNESCO since 1996 when he was awarded the Hirayama/UNESCO Silk Roads Fellowship. Karimov participated at the International Symposium on the Silk Roads in Xi’an (China), organized on the occasion of the United Nations Year for Cultural Heritage and the 30th anniversary of the World Heritage Convention organized by UNESCO in November 2002.

Elyor Karimov one of the authors of multi-volume History of Civilizations of Central Asia, published by UNESCO, member of the annual “Сolloque international Soufisme, Culture et Musique ‘‘les Routes de la Foi’’, founded by UNESCO in Algeria from 2005.

He is a Member of the UNESCO Memory of the World Register Sub-Committee from 2014 (located in UNESCO Headquarters, Paris, France). Karimov is formally affiliated with the Institute of History, Academy of Sciences of Uzbekistan, but is effectively an independent scholar, living most of the time in the United Arab Emirates. He is a Professor of the Middle East and Central Asia at the Hofstra University (United States) since 2017.

Elyor Karimov is an expert in the History of Civilization and Culture in Central Asia and the Middle East with numerous research publications in this field. His research is unique in that he uses both written and oral sources and combines approaches, which lie at the intersection of history, religious studies, and anthropology. His knowledge of Persian and Chaghatai has positioned him well for critically assessing the study of social history in Islamic Central Asia. His publications in English, Uzbek, and Russian address a spectrum of themes: Islam in early modern Central Asia; elucidation of legal documents from qazi courts; studies of contemporary shrines and their keepers; a social history of women and family in Central Asia.

== Notable works ==
- Religion Made Official: a Comprehensive Collection of Documents from the State Archives of Soviet Uzbekistan, 1920s – 1960s. [with David Abramson] / “Institut Francais d’Etude sur l’Asie Centrale”, Almaty, Kazakhstan, 2009.
- The Kubraviya Waqf (17th-19th Centuries): Written Sources on the Late History of the Kubravi Sufi Brotherhood in Central Asia / Tashkent, “Fan” Publishers: 2008, 280 p. [in English, Uzbek and Russian]
- Library of Congress Online Catalog
- Book Review by Alexandre Papas (CNRS, Paris): Central Eurasian Reader: A Biennial Journal of Critical Bibliography and Epistemology of Central Eurasian Studies / Verlag: Klaus Schwar, Berlin; Band: Vol.2; 2010.
- Qadhiy Documents and Khan’s yarliqs of the Khiva Khanate of 17th - the beginning of 20th centuries / Tashkent, “Fan” Publishers: 2007, 224 p. (in French and Russian)
- Library of Congress Online Catalog: Book review by Maria Szuppe (CNRS, Paris)
- Sacred Sites, Profane Ideologies: Religious Pilgrimage and the Uzbek State [with David Abramson] // Everyday Life in Central Asia Past and Present, edited by Jeff Sahadeo and Russell Zanca. Indiana University Press: 2007, pp. 319–338
- The Jews of Bukhara: the End of a Doubly Minoritary Space-Time (1897-1918). [with Catherine Poujol] // Revue des mondes musulmans et de la Méditerranée, n° 107-110 – Identités confessionnelles et espace urbain, septembre 2005: pp. 351–374 (in French)
- History of Civilizations of Central Asia. Development in contrast: from the sixteenth to the mid-nineteenth century. Vol. 5. UNESCO Publishing, Paris, 2003. pp. 760–768
- New Collections of Sources on Khorazm’s History of the XVII – the Beginning of the XX Century // UNESCO International Symposium on the Silk Roads, 2002. Presentation Paper. Xi’an, China 2002: pp. 193–197
- History of Civilizations of Central Asia: The Achievements (AD 750 - 15th Century). Vol. 4 (Part 2), Chapter 2, Part 3. UNESCO Publishing, Paris, 2000. pp. 81–85
- Sufi Brotherhoods in the 15th Century Central Asia // Bamberger Zentralasienstudien: Konferenzakten / ESCAS IV, Bamberg 8–12 October 1991, Ingeborg Baldauf; Michael Friederich (Hrsq.), Berlin: Schwarz, 1994, pp. 241–248
