= Tamara Abaeva =

Soviet historian (1927)

Tamara Grigorievna Abaeva
- Born: July 17, 1927 (age 98); Khiva
- Occupations: historian, specializing in oriental studies

Tamara Grigorievna Abaeva (Russian: Тамара Григорьевна Абаева; born 17 July 1927) was a Soviet Uzbek and Tajik historian, specializing in oriental studies. She was born in Khiva and studied at the National University of Uzbekistan in Tashkent (then known as SAGU (САГУ)). In 1961, she obtained her doctorate in history with a dissertation titled Essays on the history of Badakhshan. She was an employee of the Institute of Oriental Studies of the Academy of Sciences of the Uzbek SSR. She contributed to numerous historical works, her specialization being the history of the Pamir-Hindukush region of Afghanistan and that of Badakhshan.
