= Mikhail Masson =

Uzbek archeologist

- Born: Mikhail Yevgenyevich Masson; December 3, 1897; Saint Petersburg, Russian Empire
- Died: October 2, 1986 (aged 88); Tashkent, Uzbek SSR, USSR
- Education: Petrograd Polytechnic Institute, Central Asian State University
- Partner: Galina Anatolyevna Pugachenkova
- Children: Vadim Masson
- Parents: Evgeny Ludwigovich Masson (father); Antonina Nikolaevna Shpakovskaya (mother)
- Scientific career
- Fields: archaeology, history, numismatics
- Institutions: Tashkent State University
- Notable students: Edvard Rtveladze

Mikhail Yevgenyevich Masson (Russian: Михаил Евгеньевич Массон; 3 December 1897 in Saint Petersburg – 2 October 1986) was a Soviet archaeologist. He was the founder of the archaeology school in Central Asia and a professor, doctor of historical and archaeological sciences and member of the Turkmen Academy of Sciences.

== Biography ==
He was born on 3 December 1897, in Saint Petersburg. Mikhail Evgenyevich Masson lived with his mother in Samarkand almost from his birth. He studied at the Samarkand Men's Gymnasium. In 1908-1909, he participated in the excavations of the Ulugh Beg Observatory led by the archaeologist V. L. Vyatkin. On June 1, 1912, Vyatkin appointed Masson as the head of the excavation site.

In 1916, Masson graduated from the Samarkand Gymnasium. In 1916, he began studying at the Petrograd Polytechnic Institute to become an irrigation engineer. After being called to military service, he fought on the Southwestern Front, where he was elected a member of the Council of Workers' and Soldiers' Deputies in 1917.

In 1918, Masson returned to Samarkand. In Samarkand, he worked as the head of the Samarkand Regional Museum, enriching its collection with various exhibits. In 1924, he was transferred to Tashkent to work at the Turkestan (later Uzbek) Committee for Museum Affairs and the Preservation of Monuments of Antiquity and Art as the head of the archaeological department of the Central Asian Museum. During this time, he attended courses at the Turkestan Eastern Institute and conducted archaeological research during the restoration of historical monuments in Central Asia. He also worked as a museum affairs instructor in the Central Asian Republics.

From 1929 to 1936, Masson focused on the history of mining at the Geological Committee of Uzbekistan, where he established an extensive geological library. He combined this work with his role as the head of the archaeological sector of the Uzbek Committee for Museum Affairs and the Preservation of Monuments of Antiquity and Art. Starting in 1936, Mikhail Evgenyevich Masson served as the head of the Department of Archaeology at the Central Asian State University in Tashkent.

Mikhail Evgenyevich Masson passed away in Tashkent in 1986 and was buried in the Dombrobod Cemetery in Tashkent.

Later, one of the streets in Tashkent was named in honor of Mikhail Masson.

=== Family ===
Parents: father - Evgeny Ludwigovich Masson, a descendant of a Russified French aristocrat who moved to Russia during the Jacobin terror, a topographer; mother - Antonina Nikolaevna Shpakovskaya. His first wife was Xenia Ivanovna, who took her own life. His second wife, Galina Anatolyevna Pugachenkova, was a renowned Soviet and archaeologist, an academician of the Academy of Sciences of the Uzbek SSR, and researcher of Turkestan.

His son from his first wife, Vadim Masson, also became a well-known archaeologist and scholar.

=== Scientific achievements ===
He conducted excavations in the Kushan and medieval Termez from 1936 to 1938. He also conducted research in the city of Turkestan, which was then located in the territory of the Turkestan ASSR of the RSFSR (now in the South Kazakhstan Region of Kazakhstan). In 1934, Masson surveyed the Turkestan settlement of Kul-Ata, creating a plan of castle ruins, the Shakhristan (settlement), and the surrounding area, uncovering numerous traces of metallurgical production.

Starting in 1946, Masson served as the head of the South Turkmenistan Archaeological Complex Expedition, which conducted work in the Turkmen SSR. Under his leadership, excavations were carried out at the Parthian ancient settlements of Nisa and Merv. M.E. Masson's research was dedicated to demonstrating the existence of a slave-owning system in Central Asia, the patterns of development in Central Asian cities such as Samarkand, Bukhara, Tashkent, and others, the history of the monetary economy and mining, architecture, epigraphy, and historical geography of Central Asia.

=== Scientific school ===
He established the Central Asian School of Archaeology and trained specialists who later became leading archaeologists in Central Asia. Some of his students included Oleg Rostovtsev, Boris Kochnev, Edvard Rtveladze, and Nina Nemtseva.

=== Awards ===
- Order of the Red Banner of Labour (20 February 1968)
- Honored Scientist of the Uzbek SSR (1944)
- Honored Scientist of the Turkmen SSR (1950)

=== Selected works ===
- On the construction of the Mausoleum of Khoja Ahmed Yasawi in the city of Turkestan // Bulletin of the Central Asian Geographical Society, Vol. 19, Tashkent, 1929;
- Regarding some coin finds registered on the territory of Kazakhstan before 1942 // Bulletin of the Academy of Sciences of the Kazakh SSR, 1948.

=== Memory ===
A street in Tashkent in the Sergeli District was named after him, but in 2013, it was renamed Obikhayot Street.

== Literature ==
- Lunin B.V. Scientist, teacher, public figure // History and archeology of Central Asia. Ashgabat: Ylim, 1978. pp. 12–19.
- Masson M.E. Practical problems of archeology in Central Asia and their topics // Scientific Committee of the UzSSR. Tashkent, 1937. Separate edition.
- Masson M.E. Archaeological research in Uzbekistan (1924-1939) // Science in Uzbekistan for 15 years. Tashkent, 1939.
- Masson M.E. Archaeological work in Uzbekistan in 1933-1935 // Proceedings of the III International Congress on Iranian Art and Archeology. L., 1939.
- Masson M.E. Ancient settlements of Old Termiz and their study // Proceedings of the Uzbekistan branch of the Academy of Sciences of the USSR. Series I. Vol. 2. Tashkent, 1940.
- Masson M.E. Brief description of the history of the study of Central Asia from an archaeological point of view // Proceedings of SASU. Archeology of Central Asia. New episode. Vol. LXXXI. Tashkent: SAGU publishing house, 1956.
- Masson M.E. Central Asian School of Archeology at ToshSU // Materials of the Central Asian State. flour Vol. 295. Archeology of Central Asia. Tashkent, 1966.
- Masson M.E. The fallen tower. Tashkent: Uzbekistan, 1968.
- Masson M.E. From the memoirs of a Central Asian archaeologist. Tashkent: Gafur Ghulam Literary and Art Publishing House, 1976.
- Pugachenkova G.A. Mikhail Evgenievich Masson is the founder of the Central Asian Archaeological School. Tashkent: University, 1995.
- Rtveladze E. Respice post te, or Academician Masson and others // Above East. Vol. XXVI. Tashkent, 2012.
- Rtveladze E.V. Remembering the past. Book I. Tashkent, 2012.
- Method of work and field life of South Turkmenistan archaeological complex expedition (memories of participants). Ashgabat, 1972.
- Central State Administration of the Republic of Uzbekistan, f. R-2773, op. 1, building 251
- Central State Administration of the Republic of Uzbekistan, f. R-2773.

== See also ==
- Edvard Rtveladze
- Ubaydulla Uvatov
