= Zafar Usmanov =

Soviet and Tajik mathematician (1937–2021)

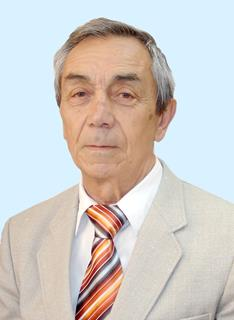
- Born: 26 August 1937; Dushanbe, Tajik SSR, Soviet Union
- Died: 13 October 2021 (aged 84)
- Education: MSU (mechmat)
- Scientific career
- Fields: mathematics, computer science
- Workplaces: Institute of mathematics TAS
- Website: tajlingvo.tj

Zafar Juraevich Usmanov (Tajik: Усмонов Зафар Ҷӯраевич; 26 August 1937 – 13 October 2021) was a Soviet and Tajik mathematician, doctor of physical and mathematical sciences (1974), professor (1983), full member of the Academy of Sciences of the Republic of Tajikistan (1981), Honored scientist of the Republic of Tajikistan (1997), laureate of the State Prize of Tajikistan in the field of science and technology named after Abu Ali ibn Sino (2013).

== Biography ==
Zafar Juraevich Usmanov was born on 26 August 1937 in Dushanbe. Father — Jura Usmanov, historian, journalist, Mother — Hamro (Asrorova) Usmanova, party and state worker. Sibling of the academician of the Academy of Sciences of the Republic of Tajikistan, Pulat Usmanov.

- 1954–1959 — studies at the Faculty of Mechanics and Mathematics of MSU.
- 1959–1962 — graduate student of the Department of Mechanics of Moscow State University,
- 1962–1970 — researcher of the mathematical team of the Academy of Sciences of the Republic of Tatarstan,
- 1970–1973 — head of the Computing Center, (deputy head) of the Department of Mathematics with the Computing Center of the Academy of Sciences of the Republic of Tajikistan,
- 1973–1976 — Deputy Director for Science of the Mathematical Institute with the Computing Center of the Academy of Sciences of the Republic of Tajikistan,
- 1976–1984 — Head of the Computing Center of the Academy of Sciences of the Republic of Tajikistan,
- 1984–1988 — academician-secretary of the Department of Physical, Mathematical, Chemical and Geological Sciences of the Academy of Sciences of the Republic of Tajikistan,
- 1988–1999 — Director of the Institute of Mathematics of the Academy of Sciences of the Republic of Tajikistan,
- From 1999 to the present — Head. Department of Mathematical Modeling, Institute of Mathematics, Academy of Sciences of the Republic of Tajikistan,
- 1976 — Corresponding Member of the Academy of Sciences of the Republic of Tajikistan,
- 1981 — Full member of the Academy of Sciences of the Republic of Tajikistan with a degree in mathematics,
- 1985–1990 — Deputy of the Supreme Council of the Tajik SSR,
- 1986–1991 — member of the Revision Commission of the Central Committee of the Communist Party of Tajikistan,
- 1997–2011 — Professor of the Moscow Power Engineering Institute (Technical University), Volzhsky branch of Volzhsky,
- 1999 — Professor, Department of Informatics, Technological University of Tajikistan, Head of the Department of «Natural Process Metrics» of the Virtual Institute of Interdisciplinary Time Studies, Moscow State University.
- 2018 — Chairman of the dissertation council 6D.KOA-032 at the Tajik Technical University named after academician M.S. Osimi

== Scientific training ==
The scientific organizer of systemic training at the Institute of Mathematics is about 30 candidates of physical and mathematical sciences on modern problems of computer science. He prepared 18 candidates of sciences in the specialties of differential equations, geometry, computer science, hydromechanics, hydraulics and the history of mathematics, and one doctor of sciences in water problems.

== Teaching ==
- 1959–1961 — Faculty of Mechanics and Mathematics, Moscow State University M.V. Lomonosova, Moscow,
- 1965–1994, 2007–2009 — Faculty of Mechanics, Mathematics and Physics, Tajik National University, Dushanbe,
- 1966–1968 — Faculty of Mathematics, Tajik State Pedagogical University, Dushanbe,
- 1997–2011 — Department of Power Engineering, Moscow Power Engineering Institute (Technical University), Volzhsky Branch, Volzhsky,
- 1999 — IV Department of Mathematics, Graz University of Technology, (spring semester), Austria,
- Faculty of Information Technologies, Technological University of Tajikistan, Dushanbe.

== Scientific activity ==
Usmanov successfully defended his Ph.D. thesis: «Some boundary value problems for systems of differential equations with singular coefficients and their applications to bendings of surfaces with a singular point» / Tajik State National University, (1966) / and doctoral dissertation: "Study of the equations of the theory of infinitesimal bendings of surfaces with positive curvature with a flattening point ", Faculty of Mechanics and Mathematics, / Moscow State University M.V. Lomonosova, (1973) /. The scientific interests of the scientist:

- Generalized Cauchy-Riemann systems with singularities at isolated points and on a closed line;
- Deformation of surfaces with an isolated flattening point, a conical point, and a parabolic boundary;
- Modeling the proper time of an arbitrary process;
- Modeling of environmental, economic, industrial and technological processes;
- Automation of information processing in Tajik.

=== In the field of theoretical mathematics ===
The theory of generalized Cauchy-Riemann systems with a singular point of the 1st and above 1st order in the coefficients, as well as with the 1st order singularity in the coefficients on the boundary circle, which was a natural generalization of the classical analytical apparatus of I. N. Vekua, developed to study generalized analytic functions. Based on the fundamental achievements in the development of the theory of generalized Cauchy-Riemann systems with singularities, in-depth studies have been carried out on the effect of an isolated flattening point on infinitesimal and exact bends of surfaces of positive curvature. Some progress has been made in solving the generalized Christoffel problem of determining convex surfaces from a predetermined sum of conditional radii of curvature defined on a convex surface with an isolated flattening point (together with A. Khakimov). For a wide class of natural processes described by ordinary differential equations and partial differential equations, natural metrics such as spatio-temporal Minkowski metrics are constructed, based on which a definition of the concept of the intrinsic time of a process and constructive methods for measuring it are proposed. Computational experiments have established the promise of using the new concept to increase the effectiveness of the prognostic properties of mathematical models.

=== In the field of applied mathematics ===
A mathematical model has been developed for the evolution of collection material of an arbitrary nature (together with T. I. Khaitov); a mathematical model for describing the evolution of spiral shells by the example of gastropods (together with M.R. Dzhalilov and O.P. Sapov); a mathematical model for determining the gradations of liver failure (together with H. Kh. Mansurov and others); mathematical model of the dynamics of the desert community of the Tigrovaya Balka nature reserve (together with G. N. Sapozhnikov et al.) Some of these results were noted in the reports of the Chief Scientific Secretary of the Presidium of the USSR Academy of Sciences among the most important achievements of the USSR Academy of Sciences in the field of theoretical mathematics in the 70s years and twice in the field of computer science in the 80s.

=== In the field of informatization of the Tajik language ===
He created a scientific school in computer linguistics in Tajikistan. He prepared 5 candidates of sciences in mathematical and statistical linguistics. As a leader and direct executor of works, together with his students, he carried out extensive research on the automation of information processing in the Tajik language.

He has published over 280 scientific papers on theoretical and applied mathematics in scientific journals of the countries of near and far abroad and has registered 16 intellectual products in the National Patent Information Center of the Ministry of Economic Development and Trade of the Republic of Tatarstan

== Major monographs ==
- ZD Usmanov, Generalized Cauchy-Riemann systems with a singular point, Pitman Monographs and Surveys in Pure and Applied Mathematics, 85, Longman, Harlow, 1997, 222 p., ISSN 0269-3666, ISBN 0-582-29280-8 [1 ]
- Programming the states of a collection, Moscow: Nauka, 1983, −124 p. (Programmer’s library, co-author T.I. Khaitov)
- Periods, rhythms and cycles in nature, Handbook, Dushanbe, Donish, 1990. −151 p. (co-authors Yu. I. Gorelov, l. I. Sapova)
- Modeling time, Moscow: Knowledge, 1991, −48 s. (New in life, science, technology. Series Mathematics, Cybernetics).
- Generalized Cauchy-Riemann systems with a singular point, Math. Institute with the Computing Center of the Academy of Sciences of the Republic of Tajikistan, Dushanbe, 1993, −244 p.
- Generalized Cauchy-Riemann systems with a singular point, Addison Wesley Longman Ltd., Harlow, England, 1997, −222 p. (Pitman Monographs and Survey in Pure and Applied Mathematics).
- The experience of computer synthesis of Tajik speech in the text, Technological University of Tajikistan, — Dushanbe, Irfon, 2010. — 146 p. (co-author H.A. Khudoiberdiev)
- The problem of the layout of characters on a computer keyboard. Technological University of Tajikistan, — Dushanbe: «Irfon», 2010. — 104 p. (co-author O. M. Soliev)
- Formation of the base of the morphs of the Tajik language. Dushanbe, 2014 .-- 110 s. (co-author G. M. Dovudov)
- Morphological analysis of Tajik word forms. Dushanbe: Donish, 2015. — 132 p. (co-author G. M. Dovudov)

== Implement results ==
- supervised the development and implementation of an automated system for the distribution of paired cocoons in cocoon winding machines for the Dushanbe silk-winding factory;
- He supervised and directly participated in the development of the mathematical foundations for optimizing the extractant enrichment process in the countercurrent extraction technological chain with the implementation of the results for the practical extraction of sea buckthorn oil from pulp;
- developed the mathematical basis for the automatic design of slotted grooves of winding drums for the Tajiktekstilmash plant;
- led the development of a temporary standard for Tajik graphics for use in network technology; development was sent to the Moscow representative office of MICROSOFT for inclusion in the WINDOWS editor (approved by Decree of the Government of the Republic of Tajikistan on 2 August 2004, No. 330);
- Together with his graduate student O. Soliev, he implemented through the Ministry of Communications of the Republic of Tajikistan the driver we developed for the layout of Tajik letters on a computer keyboard and instructions for installing it for use in everyday work;
- Together with his graduate student Kh. Khudoiberdiev, he developed and created a software and hardware complex for the automatic unstressed sounding of Tajik texts;
- together with his students O. Soliev, Kh. Khudoiberdiev developed and created the Tajik computer text editor (Tajik Word);
- together with S. D. Kholmatova, O. Soliev and H. Khudoyberdiev, developed and created:
- — Tajik-Russian computer dictionary ,
- — Russian-Tajik computer dictionary;
- — universal Russian-Tajik-Russian computer dictionary (MultiGanj);
- together with L. A. Grashchenko and A. Yu. Fomin, he created a computer Tajik-Persian converter of graphic writing systems;
- Together with students O. Soliev, H. Khudoiberdiev and G. Dovudov, he developed and created the Tajik language pack (spell checker) for OpenOffice.Org and Windows.

Usmanov Z.J. is:

- Member of the Scientific Board of Advisers, American Biographical Society,
- Head of the Department of «Natural Process Metrics» of the Virtual Institute of Interdisciplinary Study of Time, Moscow State University, Moscow ,
- Member of the Editorial Board of the Central Asian Journal of Mathematics (Central Asian J Math)

Wilmington, USA Central Asian Mathematical Journal, Washington, USA. (2005),

- intravital member of ISAAC (2005),
- Member of the International Editorial Board of the journal "Bulletin of the Samara State Technical University. Series «Physics and Mathematics» "(2014)
- Reviewer of articles submitted to the journal «Complex variables & Elliptic equations», University of Delaware, Newark, USA (regular reviewer of CV & EE) (2011),

as well as at international conferences:

- International Multi-Conference on Society, Cybernetics and Informatics: IMSCI; International Conference on Complexity, Cybernetics, and Informing Science and Engineering: CCISE;
- International Conference on Social and Organizational Informatics and Cybernetics: SOIC).

== Rewards ==
- anniversary medal "For Valiant Labor. In commemoration of the centenary of the birth of V. I. Lenin ", (1970),
- the honorary badge of the All-Union Central Council of Trade Unions «Winner of social competition», (1973),
- Honorary Badge of the All-Union Society Knowledge «For active work»
- Certificate of Honor of the Supreme Council of Tajikistan, (1987),
- Komsomol honorary badge in honor of the 70th anniversary of Komsomol, (1988),
- honorary badge of the Committee of Physical Culture and Sports under the Council of Ministers of the Tajik SSR "Veteran of Physical Education and Sports Taj. SSR ", (1990),
- Honored Scientist of the Republic of Tajikistan, (1997),
- Veteran of Labor of the Russian Federation, (1998),
- Order of the Lomonosov Committee of Public Awards of the Russian Federation, (2008),
- Laureate of the State Prize of Tajikistan in the field of science and technology. Abu Ali ibn Sino. (2013).

== See also ==
- Tajik Academy of Sciences
