= The Center for Research on Islamic Studies =

The Center for Research on Islamic Studies مركز البحوث والدراسات الإسلامية
- Formation: April 7, 1999
- Headquarters: Tashkent, st. Abdulla Qadiri, 11.
- Location: Uzbekistan
- Director: Najmiddinov Jasur
- Website: www.islamcenter.uz

The Center for Research on Islamic Studies was established by the decree of the President of The Republic of Uzbekistan PCNo. 2282 "On establishing the Tashkent Islamic University" April 7, 1999 and the Resolution of the Cabinet of Ministers No. 224 of May 6, 1999.

== Main objectives ==
1. developing guidelines for researches on Islamic studies;
2. revival, analysis and development of the rich theoretical religious scientific heritage of ancestors, and bringing them to the general public on the basis of the accumulation and synthesis of the results of research and publication of manuscript sources;
3. defining the role and importance of Islam in whole world, region and our country in terms of multi confessionalty based on the study of the role of Islam in the history of world civilization;
4. analysis of contemporary religious processes both on a regional scale and at the international level.

== Structure ==
The Center for Research on Islamic Studies consists of seven departments:

1. Department of studying the Quran (Tafseer)
2. Department of Hadith
3. Department of History and Philosophy of Islam
4. Department of Islamic law (fikh)
5. Department of spirituality, art and culture
6. Department of studying sources and manuscripts
7. Department of the expedition and reviews

== Projects ==
Currently, the center is conducting researches on fundamental, applied and innovative projects on following topics:
Fundamental projects:

1. "Development of Sciences of the Quran and Tafseer in Mawerannahr, the role of scientific heritage of famous Mufassirs’ in the spiritual life of the region".

Applied Projects:

1. "Forming a common outlook among youth through systemic analysis of problem of Islamic studies based on primary sources and heritage of our ancestors".
2. " The destructive nature of religious fanaticism, its threat to spiritual values and practical methods to strengthen - ideological immunity of youth against them".
3. "The study of social adaptation of youth in society on the basis of ethno-sociological research and development of practical recommendations".
4. "Features of the religious sphere in the context of globalization and its geopolitical importance, ways and means to improve the culture of religious tolerance among youth".
5. "Modern Sufi orders in the context of globalization: teaching methods, analyzes and conclusions".
6. "The history of the development of the art of calligraphy in Central Asia, schools of calligraphy".
7. "Theoretical and methodological problems in the study of psychology of religion".

Innovative projects:

1. Preparing electronic manual on the topic "The Role of Scientific heritage of Central Asian thinkers in increasing spiritual perfection of youth in the context of globalization".

== Collaborative relationships ==
1. Committee of Religious Affairs under The Cabinet of Ministers of The Republic of Uzbekistan;
2. Committee for Coordination of Science and Technology under the Cabinet of Ministers of the Republic of Uzbekistan;
3. Muslim Board of Uzbekistan;
4. Tashkent Islamic Institute named after Imam Bukhari;
5. The Women's Committee of Uzbekistan;
6. "Makhalla" social and welfare fund;
7. Imam Bukhari International Center;
8. Republican Centre for promotion of spirituality;
9. Scientific and Practical Center of the national idea and ideology of the Republic of Uzbekistan;
10. Ministry of Defence of the Republic of Uzbekistan;
11. Publishing and typographical union "Tashkent Islamic University";
12. Publishing house "Mawerannahr";
13. Publishing house "Yangi asr avlodi".
