= Ernst Cohn-Wiener =

German art historian (1882–1941)

Ernst Cohn-Wiener (1882–1941) was a German historian of Islamic art. Born in the city of Tilsit, he studied the history of art, archaeology, and philosophy in Berlin and Heidelberg from 1902 to 1906. He received his PhD from Heidelberg in 1907. In the 1920s his interest turned to Islamic art history and he resolved to explore the monuments of Central Asia, a little-known field at the time. After expeditions in 1924 and 1925, he published Turan: Islamische Baukunst in Mittelasien. In 1933 Cohn-Wiener lost his position due to the antisemitic policies of the Nazis and he emigrated with his wife to India where he was employed by the Maharaja of Baroda. In 1939 emigrated to the USA where he died in 1941.

Cohn-Wiener's photographic archive was acquired by the British Museum in 1998 from the School of Oriental and African Studies, University of London. The Museum's archive consists of 868 images, primarily glass negatives.

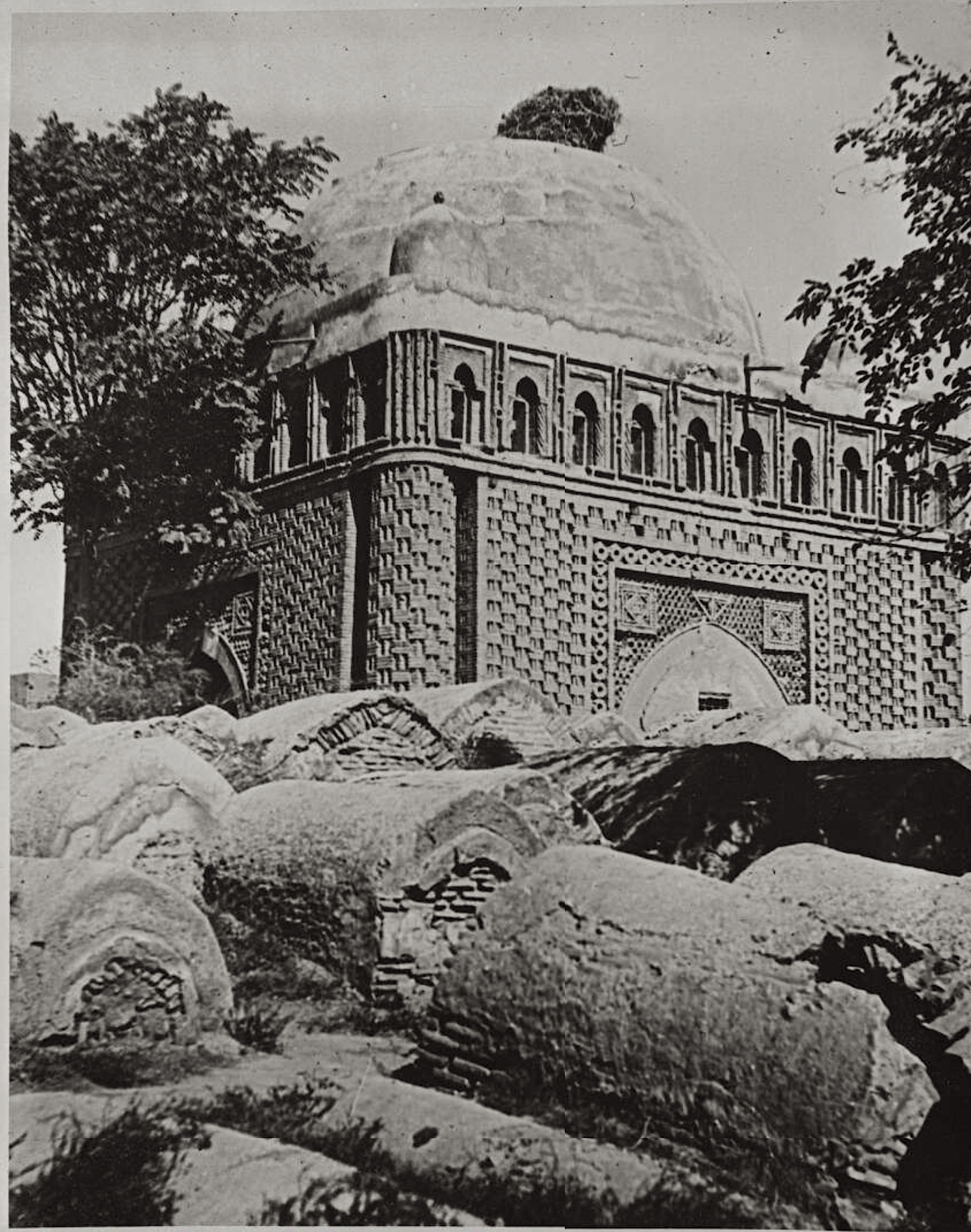
Bukhara (Uzbekistan). Bukhara, Samanid Mausoleum, as documented in 1924 by Ernst Cohn-Wiener. Original glass negative in the British Museum.
