= Gʻuzor District =

Coordinates: 38°31′25″N 66°08′29″E

- District
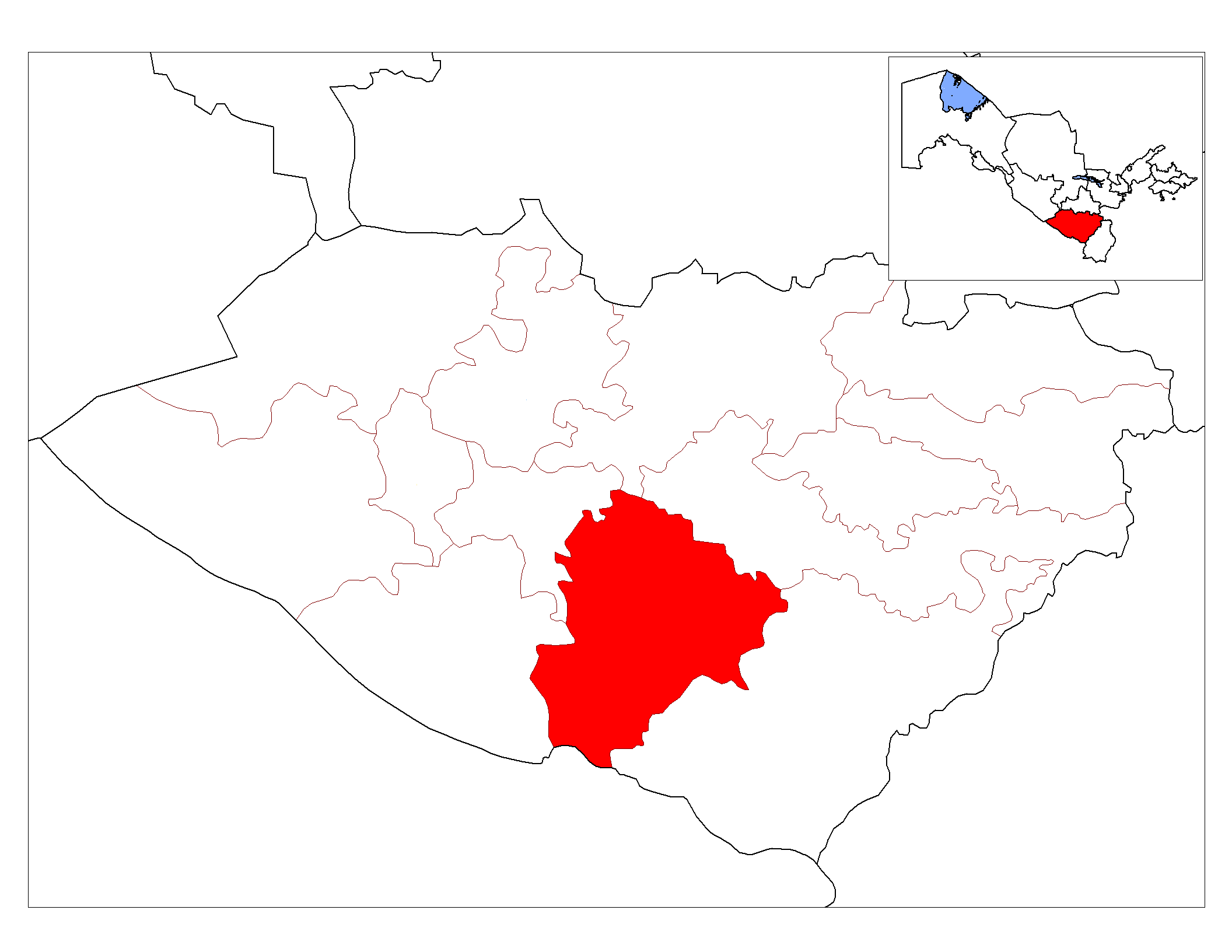
- Country: Uzbekistan
- Region: Qashqadaryo Region
- Capital: Gʻuzor

Area
  - Total: 2,660 km^{2} (1,030 sq mi)

Population (2021)
  - Total: 207,700
  - Density: 78.1/km^{2} (202/sq mi)
- Time zone: UTC+5 (UZT)

Gʻuzor District is a district of Qashqadaryo Region in Uzbekistan. The capital lies at Gʻuzor. It has an area of 2,660 km^{2} (1,030 sq mi) and its population is 207,700 (2021 est.). The district consists of one city (Gʻuzor), 5 urban-type settlements (Jarariq, Obihayot, Yangikent, Sherali, Mash'al) and 12 rural communities.
