= National University of Uzbekistan =

Public research university in Tashkent, Uzbekistan

National University of Uzbekistan named after Mirzo Ulugbek
- Mirzo Ulugʻbek nomidagi Oʻzbekiston milliy universiteti
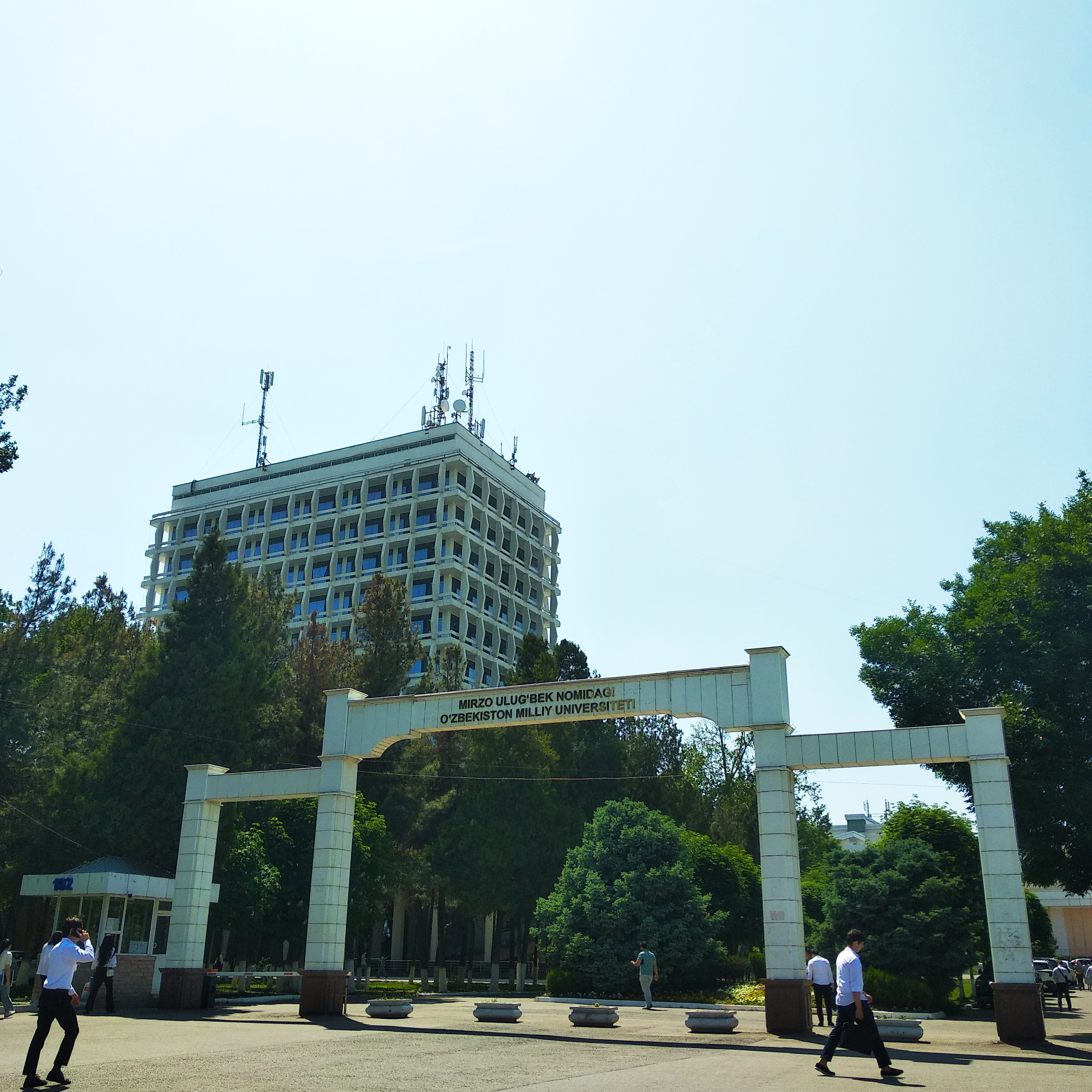
- Entrance of National University of Uzbekistan
- Type: Public research university
- Established: 1918; 108 years ago
- Rector: Inomjon Majidov
- Academic staff: 1,561 (2025/26)
- Students: 31,543 (2025/26)
- Undergraduates: 29,327 (2025/26)
- Postgraduates: 2,216 (2025/26)
- Location: Tashkent, Uzbekistan
- Campus: Urban
- Faculties: 17
- Departments: 85
- Website: www.nuu.uz

University rankings

Global – Overall
- QS World: 721-730 (2026)

Regional – Overall
- QS Emerging Europe and Central Asia: 251-300 (2022)

National University of Uzbekistan named after Mirzo Ulugbek (Uzbek: Mirzo Ulugʻbek nomidagi Oʻzbekiston milliy universiteti), commonly referred to as National University of Uzbekistan (Uzbek: Oʻzbekiston milliy universiteti, NUUz), is a public research university in Tashkent, Uzbekistan. Established in 1918 as Turkestan People's University, it is the oldest institution of higher education in Uzbekistan.

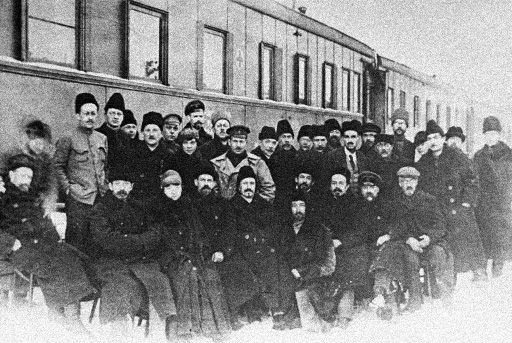
Passengers of "a science train" - the scientists who have gone to Tashkent to work at the first state university of Central Asia.

== History ==
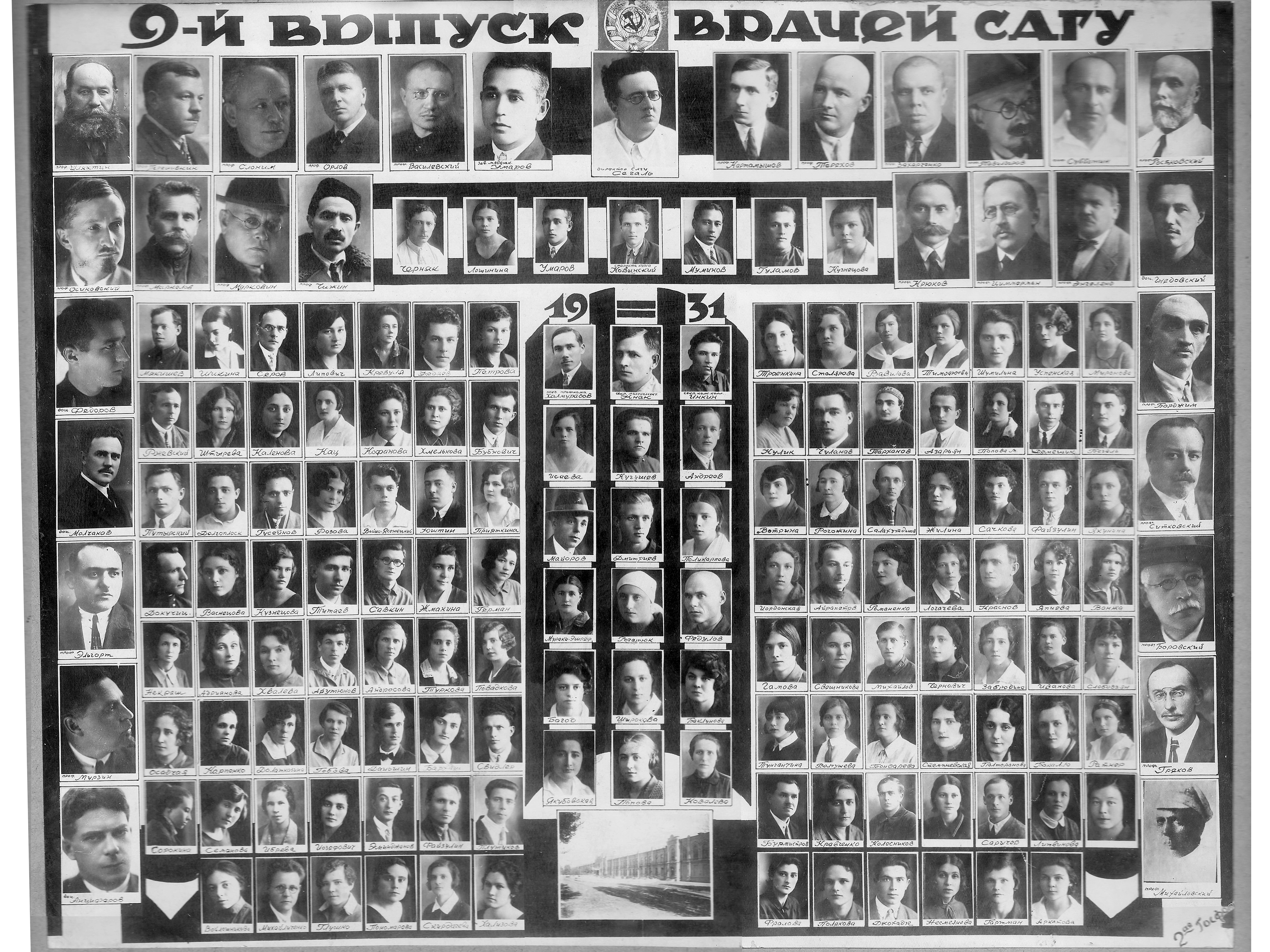
Alumnus of The First Central Asian State University

On March 16, 1918, a decree of the Turkestan's Council of People's Commissars tasked the People's Commissariat for Education with organizing a university in Tashkent. The Turkestan's Council of People's Commissars allocated 2 million rubles for the university and provided the premises. The university was officially founded on April 21, 1918, as the Turkestan People's University, with physics-mathematics, agricultural, technical, socio-economic, and historical-philological faculties, making it the oldest institution of higher learning in Central Asia.

The university was renamed to Turkestan State University in 1920, then renamed to First Central Asian State University in 1923 and renamed again to Tashkent State University, named after Lenin in 1961 and finally named National University of Uzbekistan after Uzbekistan's independence.

In 1961–1969, NUUz won the first place among institutions in Central Asia in the contemporary system of education and became one of the most prestigious higher institutions of the Soviet Union. Many Central Asian national universities were established on the basis of the NUUz, including Abai Kazakh National Pedagogical University (1925), High Pedagogy Institute of Tajikistan (1932) and the Institute of Agriculture of Tajikistan (1931).

During World War II, many academics relocated from cities in the western USSR to Central Asia, Tashkent and Alma-Ata, which were favored for their European-style infrastructure and the presence of a significant number of Russian speakers.

In the spring of 2008, the President of the Republic of Uzbekistan, Islam Karimov, signed the resolution of the 90th anniversary from the date of foundation of the university in September 1918.

In September 2018, two joint faculties with Kazan Federal University and Holonsky Israeli Technical Institute began to function.

== Organization ==
The 15 faculties and 74 departments include:

- Applied mathematics and intellectual technologies
- Mathematics
- Physics
- Geology and geoinformation systems
- Geography and natural resources
- Chemistry
- Biology
- Social sciences
- History
- Economics
- Foreign Philology
- Journalism
- Taekwondo and sport studies
- Uzbek-Israel joint faculty of Mathematical engineering and computer science

An academic lyceum named after S.H.Sirojiddinov operates under NUU. It was founded in 1970 as a boarding school of young physicists and mathematicians. Over 100 PhD professors and over 200 PhD associate professors are among the lyceum's graduates.

== Campuses and museums ==
There are 9 hostels on the “Yoshlik” campus, in which over 3200 undergraduate and graduate students live. Internet service, computer classes, international and trunk calls, a student's clinic, a sports and recreation facility, dry cleaning, dressmakers and shoemakers, training and cultural centers, libraries, dining halls, a market and shops are at the disposal of the students. Rooms for spirituality and enlightenment and also living rooms in each hostel for teachers who continue the training process with the students after classes.

=== Museums ===
NUUz has 5 museums.

==== History of the University Museum ====
This museum is designed to demonstrate the contribution of NUUz in the spread of scientific knowledge throughout Central Asia.

==== Rare Manuscripts Museum ====
Founded on March 31, 2006, this museum contains manuscripts dated to the 16th-20th centuries in the Uzbek, Tajik, Persian, Turkish and Arabic languages. These manuscripts have been kept in the university's Information and Resource Centre for 80 years. This collection began to be compiled in 1920. One of the most valuable literary pieces is Zafarnoma by Sharafiddin Ali Yazdi, created in 1454 and illustrated 12 years after its creation by a calligrapher Kamoliddin Bekhzod. Another copy of Zafarnoma is in the library of Paris University. It also holds a copy of the Quran made during the reign of the Moguls in the 16th century. In addition, works of A.N Avoi (Khamsa), Z.M.Babur's (Baburnoma, The Deeds of Tamerlane, Iskandarnoma) and other similar precious manuscripts are archived.

==== Archaeology and Ethnology Museum ====
Incorporating archaeological finds collected in Uzbekistan and Turkmenistan. Educational archaeological expeditions of the members of the sub-department “The Archaeology of Central Asia” have filled the museum expositions.

==== Zoology Museum ====
The zoology collection exhibits the largest scientific compilation in the country, gathered and maintained for over 100 years, encompassing 23,500 specimens. It includes 560 species of birds, a collection of vertebrates, rare and endangered species, as well as the exhibits of 129 kinds of unique and unprotected mammals.

==== Geology Museum ====
1400 exhibits of petrified plants and animals from the Paleolithic age are displayed.

== Degrees ==
NUUz has 93 programs for 4-year bachelor degrees, 81 programs for 2-year master's degree, and 98 doctoral degree specialties.

== Notable alumni ==
- Abdulla A'zamov
- Tamara Abaeva, historian
- Elyor Karimov
- Rashid Kadyrov
- Maimul Ahsan Khan
- Bakhadyr Khoussainov, mathematician, Humboldt Prize winner
- Jahangir Mamatov
- Vladimir Vapnik, developer of support vector machines
- Abdulla Aripov, awarded the title Hero of Uzbekistan
- Zamira Ismailovna Usmanova, archaeologist and first woman graduated at the National University of Uzbekistan
- Ruslan Medzhitov
- Erkin Vakhidov
- Ozod Sharafuddinov
- Sadi Sirajitdinov
- Tashmukhammad Sarimsakov
- Obid Sadikov
- Sadik Azimov
- Ubay Oripov
- Habib Abdullaev
- Gulam Karimov
- Ibrakhim Muminov
- Prof.Eduard Yakubov
- Victoria Vladimirovna Belaga
- Shavkat Ayupov
