= Blue Mosque, Tabriz =

15th-century Qara Qoyunlu-era former mosque in northwestern Iran

Blue Mosque مسجد کبود
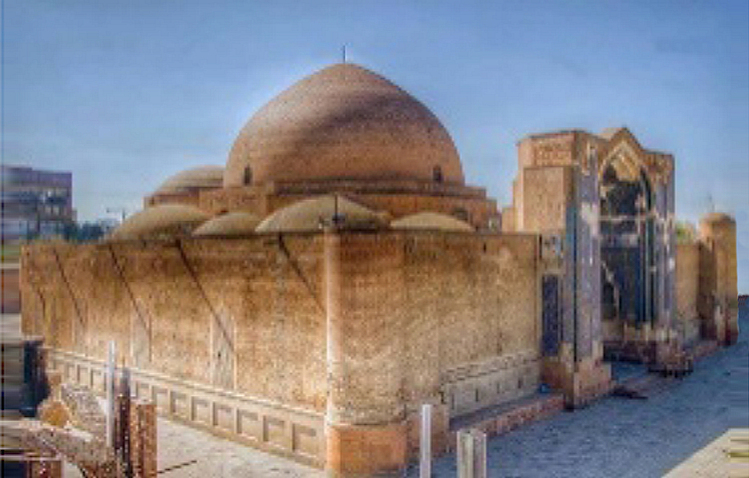
- General view of the mosque

- Location of the former mosque in Iran

Religion
- Affiliation: Sunni Islam (former)
- Ecclesiastical or organisational status: Mosque and mausoleum (former); Museum (current)
- Status: Inactive (as a mosque); Preserved (as a museum); (partial ruinous state)

Location
- Location: Tabriz, Tabriz County, East Azerbaijan
- Country: Iran
- Coordinates: 38°04′25″N 46°18′04″E

Architecture
- Architect: Reza Memaran Benam (1973)
- Type: Mosque architecture
- Style: Ottoman; Timurid
- Founder: Chatun Jan Begun
- Established: 870 AH (1465/1466 CE)
- Completed: 1480s CE

Specifications
- Dome: Ten (maybe more)
- Minaret: Two (since destroyed)
- Materials: Bricks; mosaic ceramic blue tiles

Iran National Heritage List
- Official name: Blue Mosque
- Type: Mosque
- Designated: 1932
- Reference no.: 169
- Conservation organization: Cultural Heritage, Handicrafts and Tourism Organization of Iran

The Blue Mosque (Persian: مسجد کبود, romanized: Masjed-e Kabūd), also known as the Masjed-e Moẓaffariya and as the Kabood Mosque, is a former mosque and mausoleum complex, in a partial ruinous state, partially preserved as a museum, located in Tabriz, East Azerbaijan province, Iran. The construction of the former mosque started during the Qarā Qoyunlu dynasty and was completed in 1465, but the mausoleum extension south of the mosque was completed later during the reign of the Āq Qoyunlu, into the 1480s CE.

The former Blue Mosque is widely recognized as the last remaining example of Turkmen architectural and decorative styles in the city. The features of the former mosque prompted the scholars to explore the innovative features of Tabriz's ceramic tile craftsmanship—highlighting its distinctive "blue-and-white" patterns, lusterware, and gilded cobalt tiles, which for a considerable time were recognized as the sole known example of their kind. The former mosque was added to the Iran National Heritage List in 1932, administered by the Cultural Heritage, Handicrafts and Tourism Organization of Iran.

The mosque was severely damaged in an earthquake in 1780, leaving only the iwan (entrance hall). Reconstruction began in 1973 by Reza Memaran Benam, under the supervision of Iranian Ministry of Culture. However, as of March 2025, the reconstruction was incomplete. In November 2024, it was reported that the Blue Mosque was one of several historical mosques that were submitted by the Iranian Government to UNESCO, for inclusion on the World Heritage List.

== Location ==
The Blue Mosque (Masjed-e Kabud) is located in the historical core of Tabriz, the capital of East Azerbaijan Province in northwestern Iran. The city lies in a mountainous region and is characterized by a cold semi-arid climate with considerable seasonal temperature fluctuations -cold winters with snow and dry summers with intense sunlight.

The mosque is situated near Tabriz's Grand Bazaar, in an area rich in historical and cultural heritage. Its central location, while significant for public access, also exposes the monument to increased pollution from traffic and urban development. Major roads such as Imam Khomeini Street pass nearby, increasing vibrations and air pollutants that can accelerate the deterioration of the building's delicate tilework. Located along the historical Silk Road, Tabriz positioned the Blue Mosque as a significant landmark of intercultural exchange, connecting it to major cities such as Tehran, Isfahan, Herat, and Samarkand. However, subsequent urban development altered its original spatial context and reduced its visibility within the urban fabric.

=== Response to climate change ===
Environmental factors such as high humidity during winter, freeze-thaw cycles, and intense UV radiation in summer contribute to the erosion of surface materials, particularly the famous blue tiles. The region is also influenced by prevailing northwesterly winds, which contribute to the mechanical weathering of exposed surfaces over time. Although, the mosque's compact design and roofed courtyard respond to the cold climate, reflecting an introverted architecture.

==== Resilience strategies ====
1. Weatherproofing against erosion factors: both interior and exterior surfaces were covered with tiles to prevent water infiltration and protect the structure from erosion. 2. Protection against floods and river overflow: due to the proximity of the Mehranrud River and occasional surface floods from southern areas like Liqvan, Basmenj, and Fathabad, the mosque was built on a raised stone platform. This elevation reduced the risk of water damage significantly.

== History ==
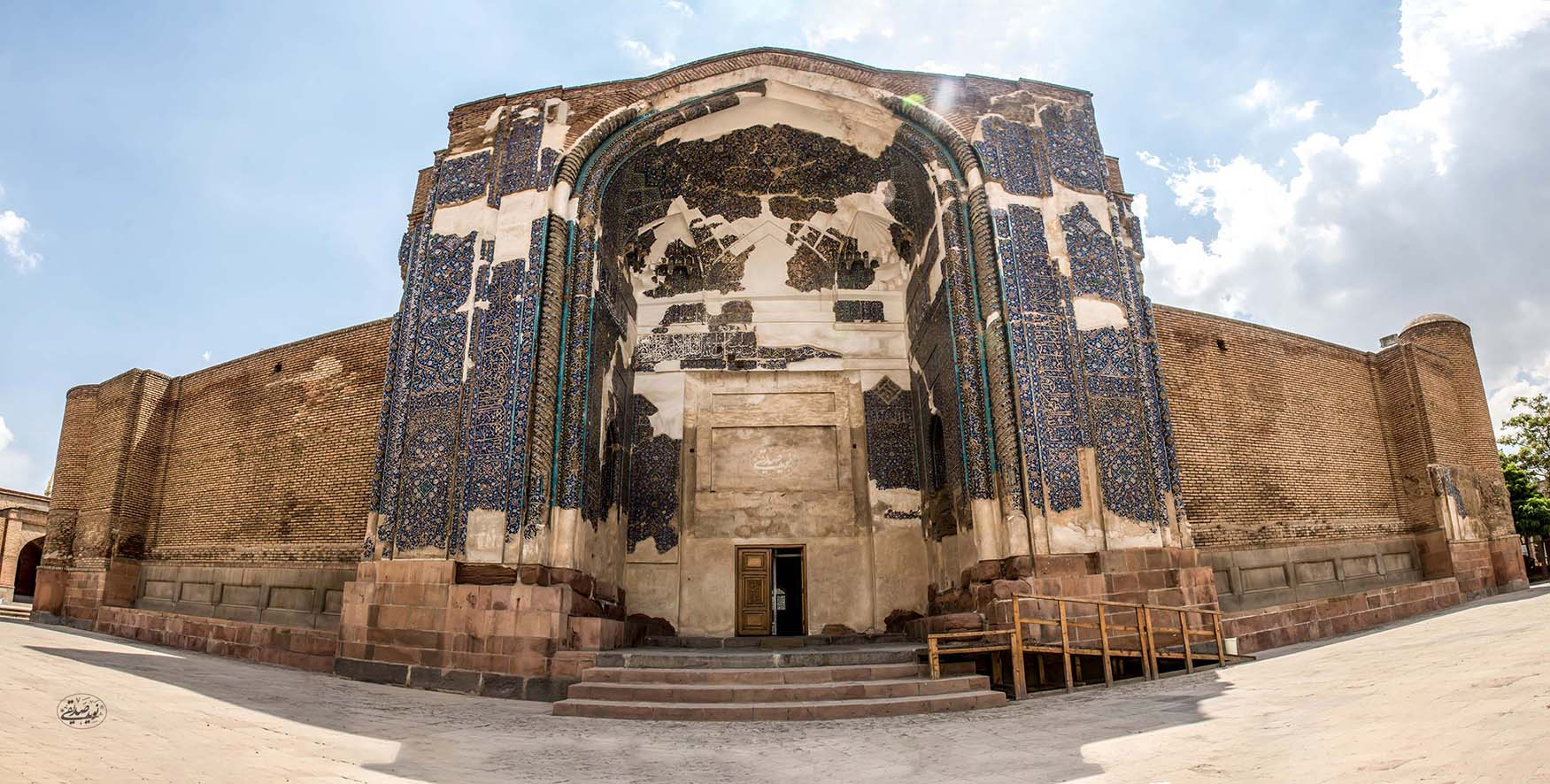
The gate entrance of the former mosque in 2017

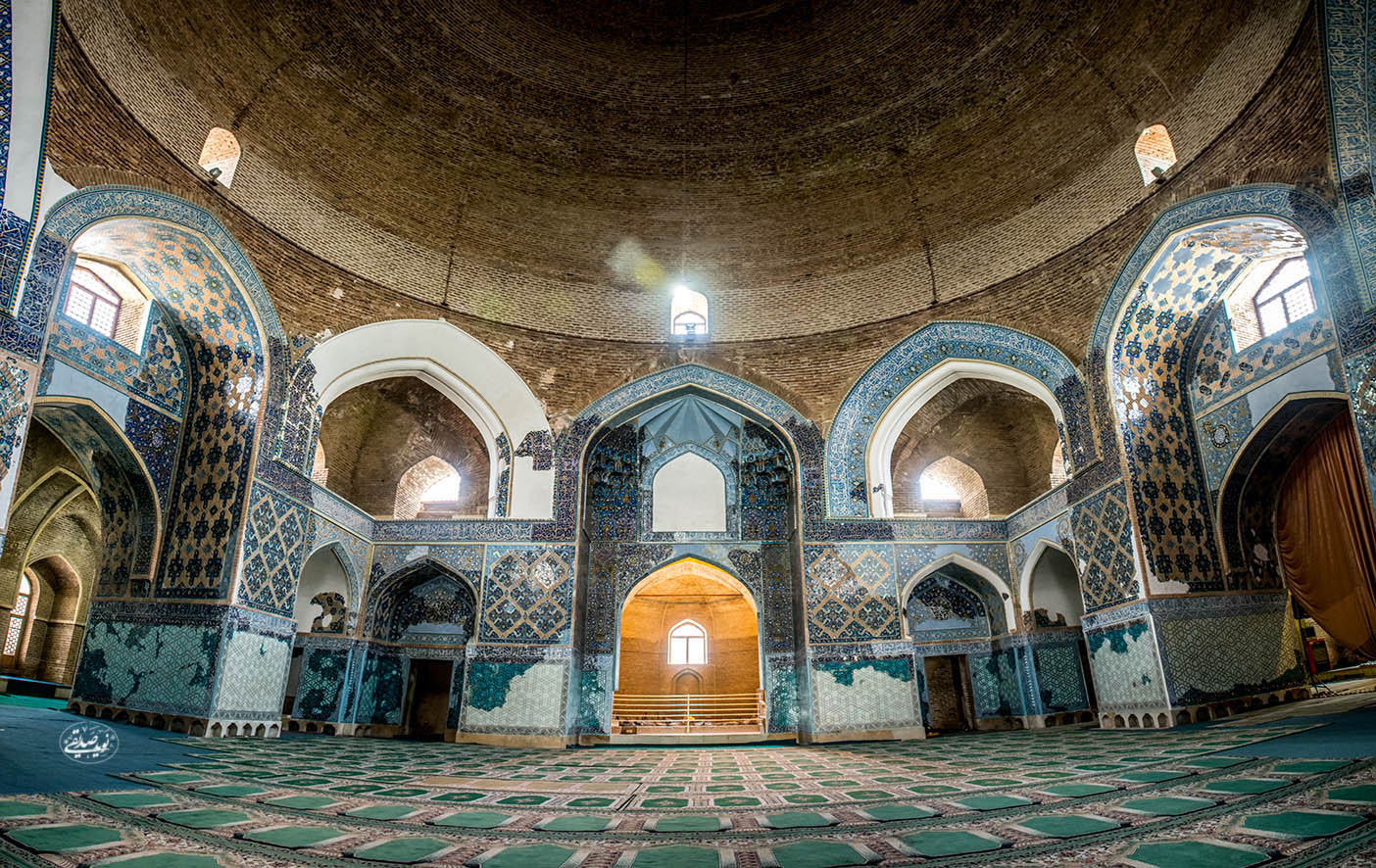
View of the main prayer hall

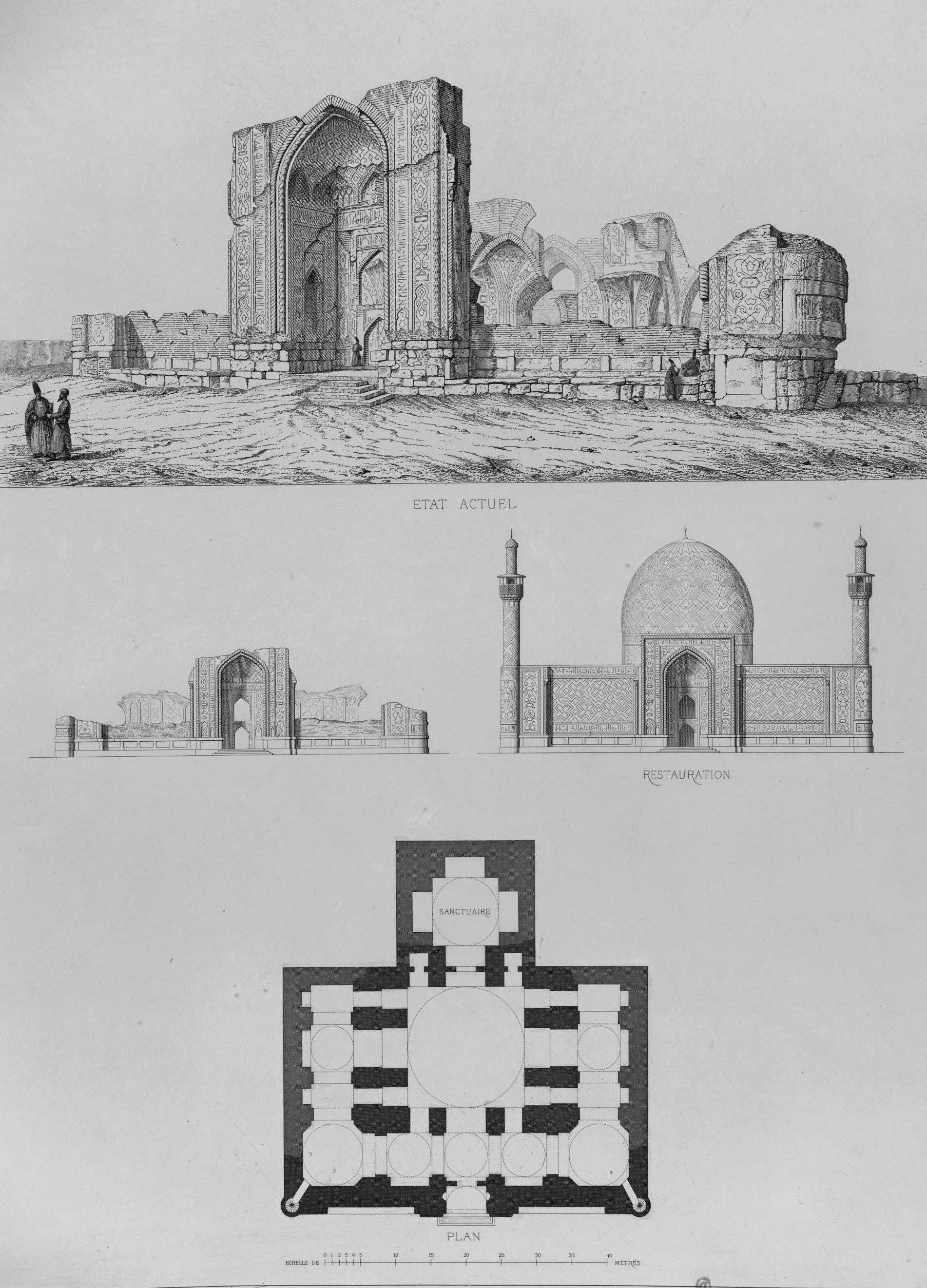
The mosque in 1840 (Pascal Coste)

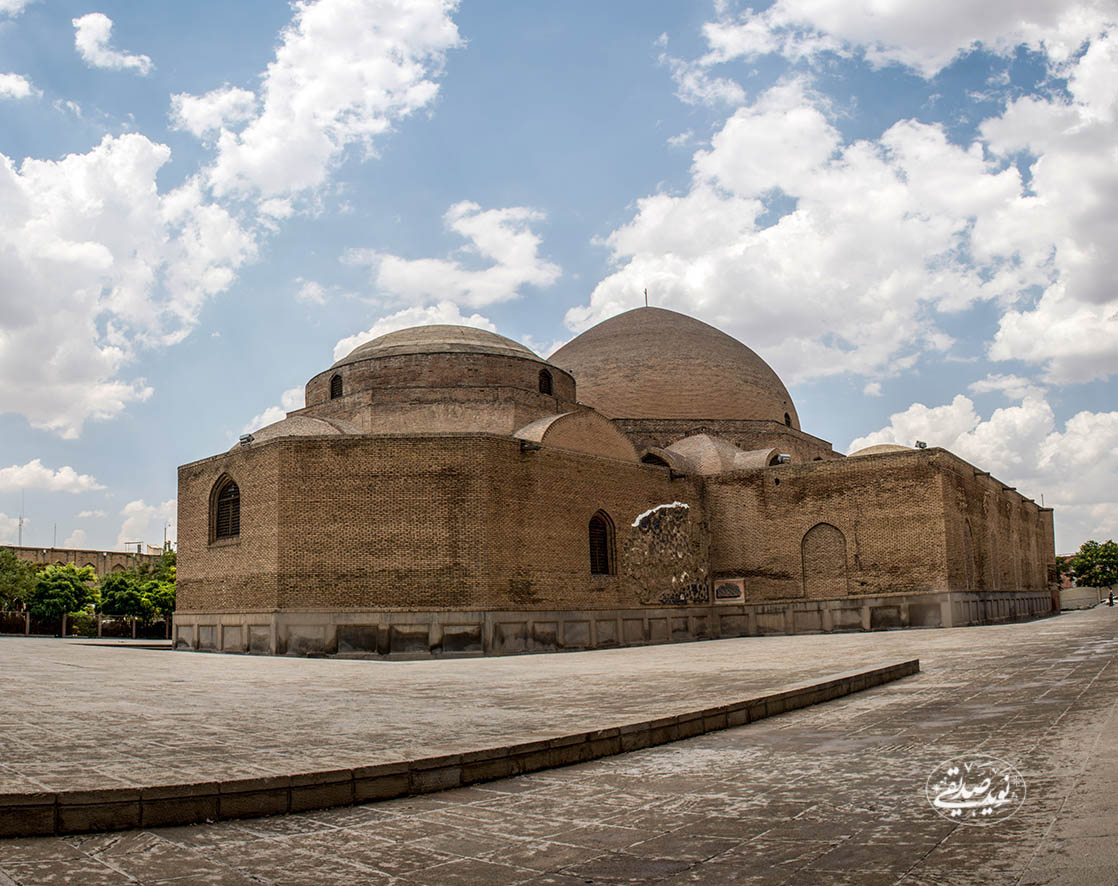
Exterior view of the mosque

Plan of the mosque reconstruction

The Blue Mosque was a part of the Moẓaffariya architectural complex, which was established through the endowment of Ḵātun Jān Begom (d. 1469), the wife of Jahānšāh, who was the ruler of the Qarā Qoyunlu dynasty (1439–1467). The complex included various structures like a Sufi convent, an underground canal, gardens, a madrasa, bathhouses and mausoleum. Only the mosque and part of the mausoleum remain. The mosque itself was completed in October 1465. Three years later, Jahānšāh and his Qarā Qoyunlu were toppled by Uzun Hassan of the Āq Qoyunlu, and Tabriz was taken. Construction was still ongoing when the Āq Qoyunlu seized Tabriz. After the deaths of Jahānšāh and Ḵātun Jān Begom, their daughter Ṣāleha Ḵātun continued overseeing the work. Under the Āq Qoyunlu ruler Uzun Hasan, from 1478 to 1490, the mausoleum's cupola and its main structure were completed.

Though the mausoleum was never completed, when the Safavids assumed control over Tabriz and made it their capital, the Blue Mosque itself served the new rulers as a mosque during the first half of the 16th century. In 1514, after the Safavids were defeated at the decisive Battle of Chaldiran, the Ottomans occupied and looted Tabriz, including the Blue Mosque. In 2011, Aube noted that at least eight carpets were looted by the Turks and taken to Istanbul (then called Constantinople). Aube notes that even though it is not known whether the Turks attacked the structure itself during the capture and occupation of the Blue Mosque, several earthquakes damaged the building between the 16th and 18th centuries. It was severely damaged by the earthquake of 1780. However, in the 17th century, the Blue Mosque was already reportedly "completely destroyed and abandoned". In the 19th century, the local people of Tabriz looted the building's ruins. In the 20th century, during the Pahlavi era, the mosque was finally rebuilt.

=== Exchange Between Ottoman and Iranian Artisans ===
During Jahanshah's rule, strong relations with the Ottomans enabled movement of artisans between both regions. Although there were cultural exchanges and shared craftsmanship between Iran and the Ottomans during Jahanshah's rule, historians like Godfrey Goodwin and Robert Mantran argue that the influence mainly flowed from Iran to the Ottomans, not the reverse.

== Architecture ==
=== Typological associations ===
The Blue Mosque of Tabriz stands as a clear example of Iranian architectural heritage, deeply rooted in the domed-building tradition. Its spatial structure-one main dome for prayer and smaller dome for burial-follows a typology typical of Iranian designs, not Ottoman ones. Although the mosque shares some formal similarities with Bursa-type mosques, its vaulting techniques, structural principles, and Azari-style decoration firmly align it with the Iranian tradition. Jahanshah and his wife, Khatun Jan Begum, followed Islamic customs by including a burial space within the Mozaffariyyeh complex. While connecting tombs to religious buildings was common in Islamic architecture (e.g., khanqahs, schools, or prayer halls), the decision to link their tomb directly to the mosque might reflect Shi'a-Alavi symbolism or rare influence from Ottoman double-domed tombs. Still, scholars agree that despite visual resemblances, the spatial logic of the Blue Mosque is fundamentally Iranian.an open space in front of the entrance iwan acting as a courtyard-differing from the typical central courtyards seen in traditional Iranian mosques. The overall layout follows a geometrically ordered plan, in contrast to the more dispersed, informal Ottoman layouts. This building illustrates the evolution of Iranian architectural typologies, showing both continuity and innovation within a uniquely Iranian context.

=== Tilework mastery ===
The peak of Timurid mosaic tilework, blending geometric floral patterns, calligraphy, and advanced craftsmanship. lt showcases the final stage of Timurid tile evolution, influenced by Central Asian techniques and local Tabrizi artisans-many whom came from Herat. Key features include the muqarnas decorated entrance, colorful seven-color tiles, and highly detailed mosaic panels, making it one of the finest examples of Islamic and of decorative art.

The mosque is one of the few completely covered mosques of Iran, built in the Timurid style.

The Blue Mosque is renowned for its exquisite tilework. The interior of the dome chamber facing the qibla is clad in dark-blue hexagonal tiles with stenciled gilding, a decorative richness unmatched until the later construction of Sheikh Lotfollah Mosque in Isfahan.

The mosque features a rich array of building materials and decorative techniques, including a foundation of stone supporting structures of fired bricks, entirely adorned with tiles and decorated fired brick panels The use of alabaster for the mausoleum's dado and the meḥrābs adds to the mosque's aesthetic grandeur. Its unique T-shaped floor plan and towering minarets reflect Ottoman architectural styles, hinting at the exchange of artistic techniques between the Ottoman Empire and the Qara Qoyunlu dynasty. The architectural brilliance of the Blue Mosque influenced many buildings from the same era. This influence is reflected in the Uzun Hasan Mosque, built by the succeeding ruler Uzun Hasan after he took control of the region. Both the Blue Mosque and the Uzun Hasan Mosque share distinctive decorative features, such as elegant mihrabs adorned with alabaster slabs, sculpted stone inscriptions above the dadoes, and extensive use of hexagonal cobalt and gilded tiles covering the walls and inner cupolas.

The mosque was a multipurpose complex with a large dome surrounded by passageways and a smaller domed mosque, possibly with a vault underneath. Its design is similar to famous mausoleums like the ʿIs̲h̲rat-k̲h̲āna in Samarqand, showing a style of detailed mausoleum architecture common in places like Ḳumm and Māzandarān.

The Kufic, and Thuluth scripts, the arabesque patterns, and the choramatic compositions of these façades, were created by Nematollah-ben-Mohammad-ol-Bavab, the calligrapher.

== Conservation laws ==
The Blue Mosque is situated within a protected urban zone governed by specific development regulations aimed at preserving its historical and architectural significance. According to Tabriz's municipal planning guidelines, construction within a 100-meter radius of the mosque is subject to strict height limitations: buildings are restricted to a maximum of two floors (approximately 6 meters), and high-rise structures exceeding three stories (around 9 meters) are prohibited to ensure the mosque remains a dominant element in the skyline.

In addition to height regulations, landscape protection measures are enforced around the mosque. Designated green spaces are preserved, and new construction is not permitted within these zones to maintain the mosque's visual relationship with its surroundings. A 50-meter buffer zone around the mosque is reserved for pedestrians, prohibiting vehicular access and enhancing the quality of the public space.

As a recognized World Heritage Site, the Blue Mosque is also subject to UNESCO conservation standards. These include strict preservation protocols that require any restoration work to be minimal, reversible, and non-invasive to the historical fabric of the structure. Major structural alterations are prohibited unless necessary for safety, and even then, interventions must respect the mosque's authenticity.

== Restoration ==
An earthquake in 1193 AH destroyed much of the Mozafarieh complex. For years, the mosque remained a ruin on the main Tabriz-Tehran route A report by André Godard, a French architect and archaeologist, from 1928 remains regarding the Goy Machid mosque: "Apart from a few columns and parts of the outer wall and its facade, which have deteriorated, nothing remains of this magnificent mosque. However, what remains is so beautiful and geometrically useful that the Iranian Archaeological Group decided to preserve it as much as possible, meaning they decided to rebuild the large dome on the shaken foundations and reinforce it, without attempting to complete the tiling which could no longer be produced today."

=== Considering the surrounding fabric for site revitalization ===
The construction of Pahlavi Street south of the Blue Mosque in 1929 created a new access route to the mosque. In the same year, the mayor of Tabriz, Mirza Mohammad Ali Khan Tarbiat, converted the adjacent ruined cemetery into a public promenade.

=== General restoration measures ===
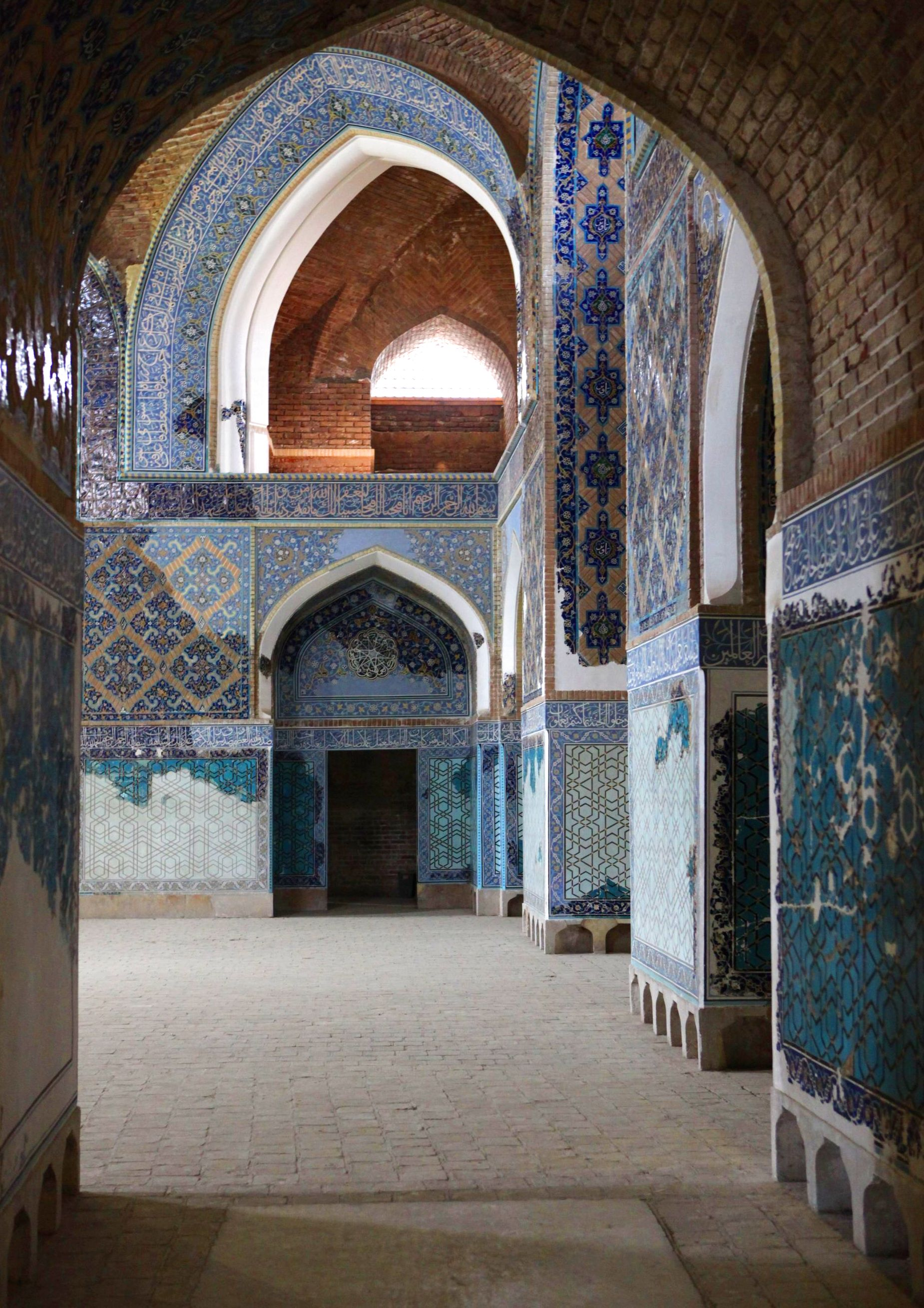
Restored interior of the Blue Mosque of Tabriz

Major repairs to walls, arches, and vaults in the main prayer hall. Reconstruction of missing parts based on original architectural forms. Use of new bricks made to match old materials. Restoration of the northern façade, including bases, arches, and entrance elements. Maintain original marble stones for future studies. Keep the large prayer hall's ceiling intact. Regulate any construction activity around the mosque under supervision of the Cultural Heritage Authority. Challenges: lack of unified methodology in past restorations. Restoration efforts at the Blue Mosque have adhered to internationally recognized conservation principles, including minimum intervention, compatibility, and distinguishability. Repairs in the main prayer hall focused on structural cracks and joints, particularly within the walls and arches. These interventions were limited to the damaged areas, avoiding any alteration to the original architectural framework, in line with the principle of minimum intervention. Where structural rebuilding was necessary—such as in walls, arches, and vaults reaching up to their apex—original tiles were preserved whenever possible. In areas where tiles were missing, new bricks were used, carefully selected to match the historical material in both appearance and structure. This approach followed the principle of compatibility, ensuring the new elements harmonized with the old. Restoration of the northern façade, including bases, arches, and vaults, was executed with high fidelity to the original design. However, slight intentional differences were incorporated into the new elements to maintain distinguishability, allowing future observers to identify the restored parts without compromising the mosque's visual integrity.

== After restoration ==
Post-restoration interventions at the Blue Mosque were guided by key conservation principles, including minimum intervention, compatibility, reversibility, and distinguishability. Traditional methods were employed for the dome's repair, aligning with the historical construction logic and ensuring compatibility with the original structure. As many traditional techniques are inherently reversible, this approach also supports future conservation needs.To preserve the structural integrity of the mosque, restorers deliberately avoided increasing the dome's height or imposing additional load, demonstrating a principle of minimum intervention. These measures respected the original form and proportions of the structure, maintaining visual and structural harmony.Restoration efforts carefully avoided interfering with existing historic elements. This approach emphasized minimum intervention and ensured reversibility by keeping new additions structurally and visually separate from the original fabric, in accordance with the principle of distinguishability.The reconstruction of the double-shell dome incorporated traditional cornering techniques, reflecting the architectural logic of the period. While compatible with the original form, the new construction remains visually distinguishable, fulfilling both compatibility and distinguishability principles.Additional elements, such as the low-rise minarets and entrance portal, were designed to avoid altering the mosque's historical scale. These volumes were proportioned to match the original tone and architectural rhythm, ensuring a harmonious integration into the historic structure.

== Gallery ==
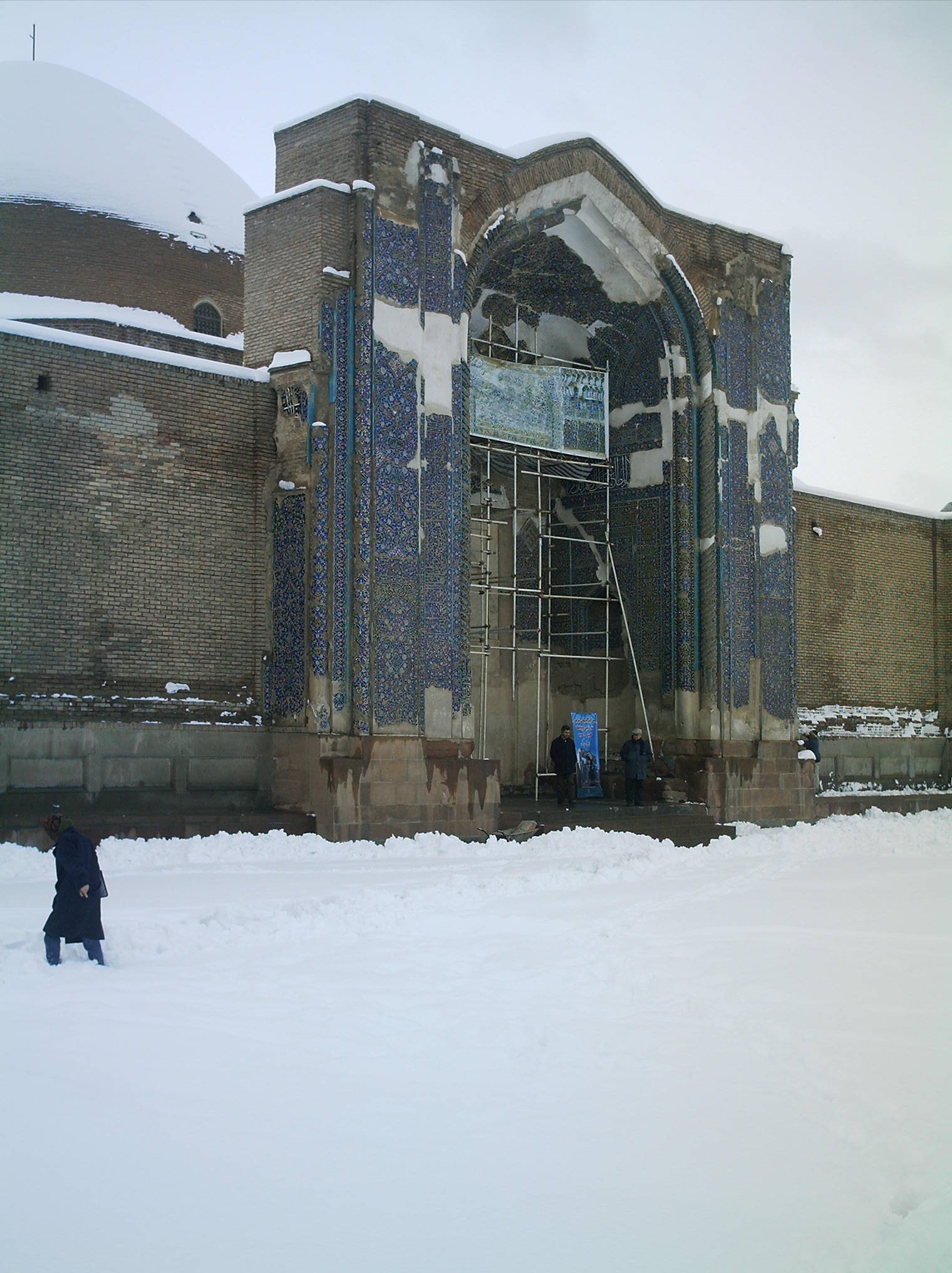
The mosque's entrance in a snowy day

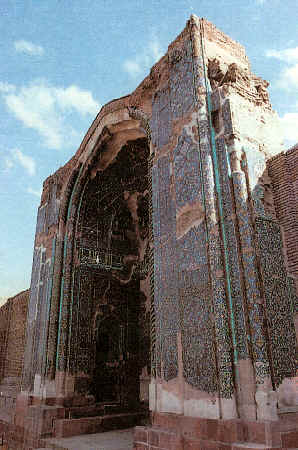
Entrance

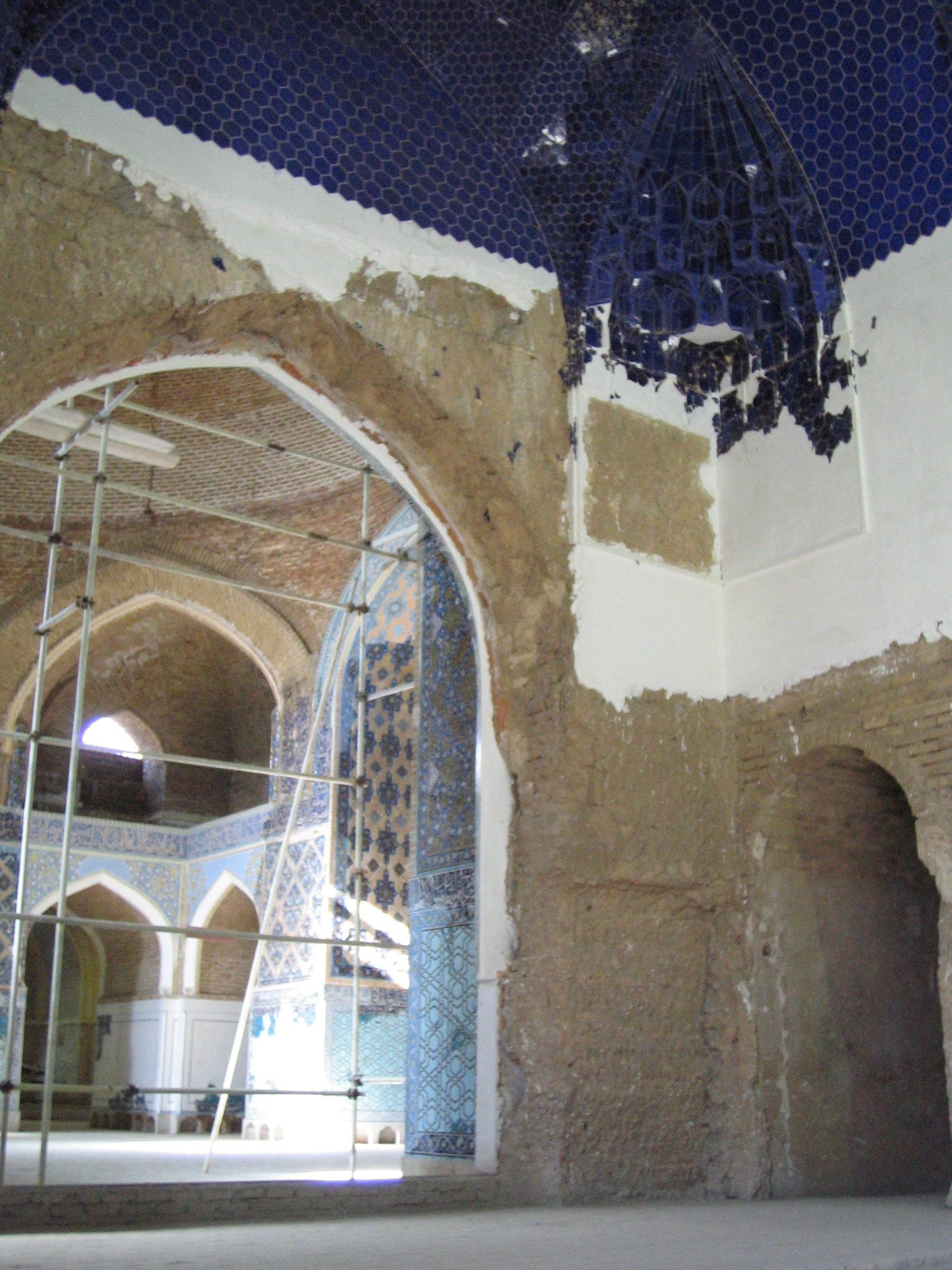
Interior view

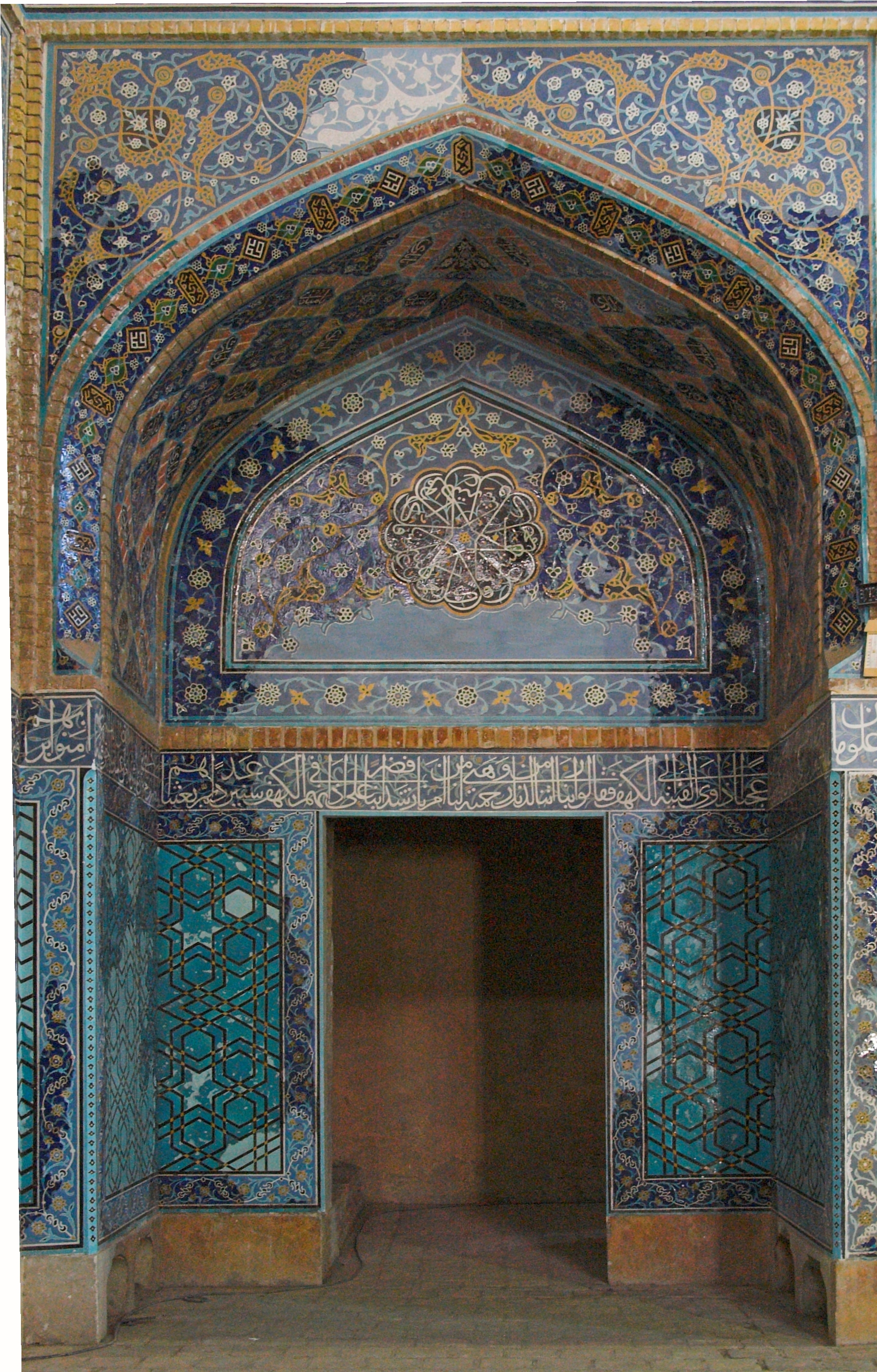
One of the inner doors

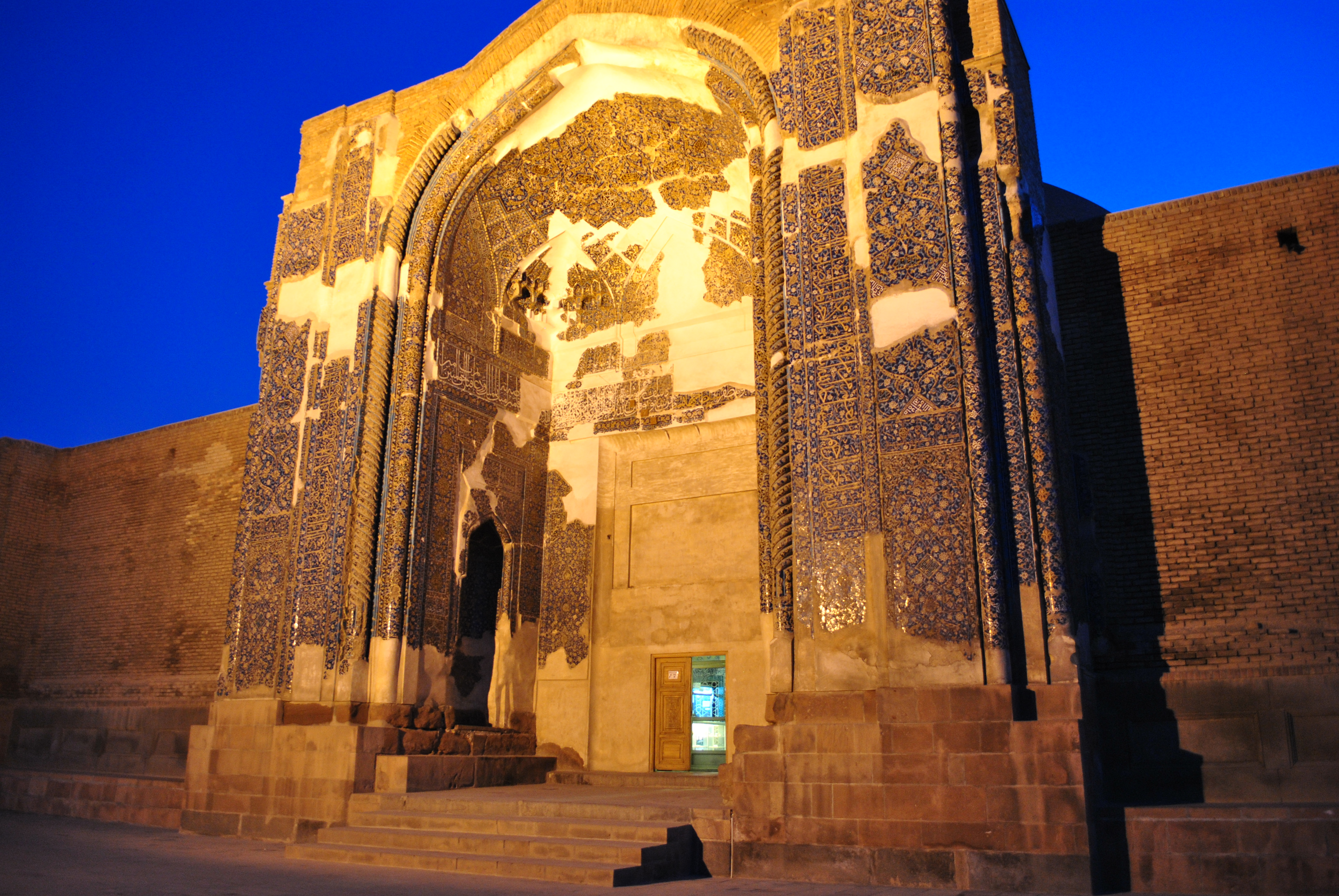
Entrance (night)

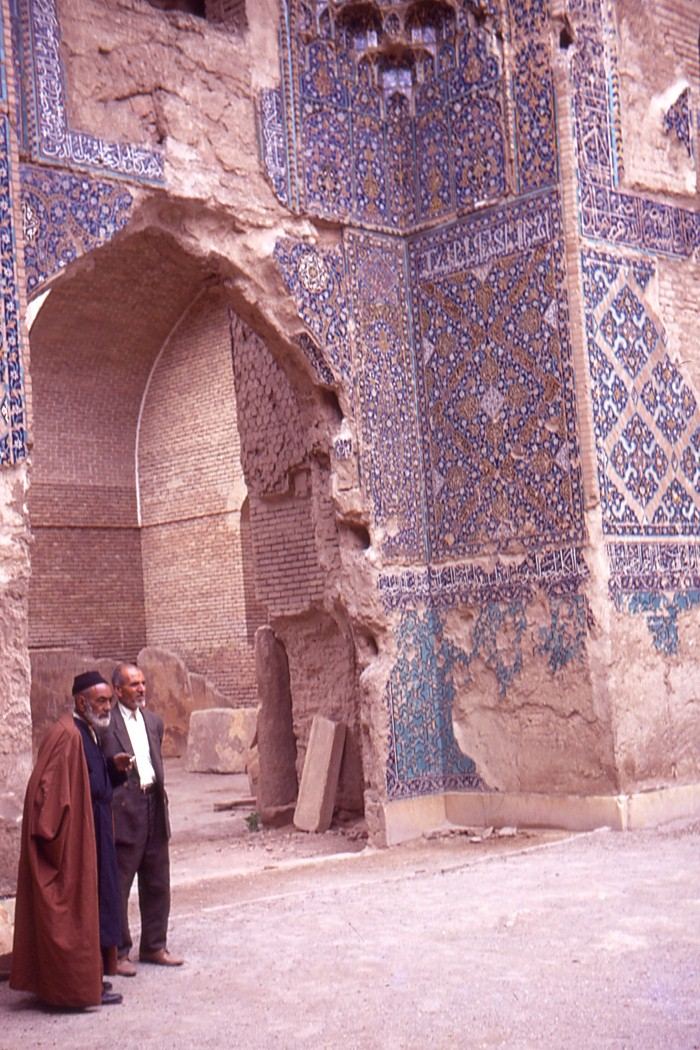
The mosque in 1969

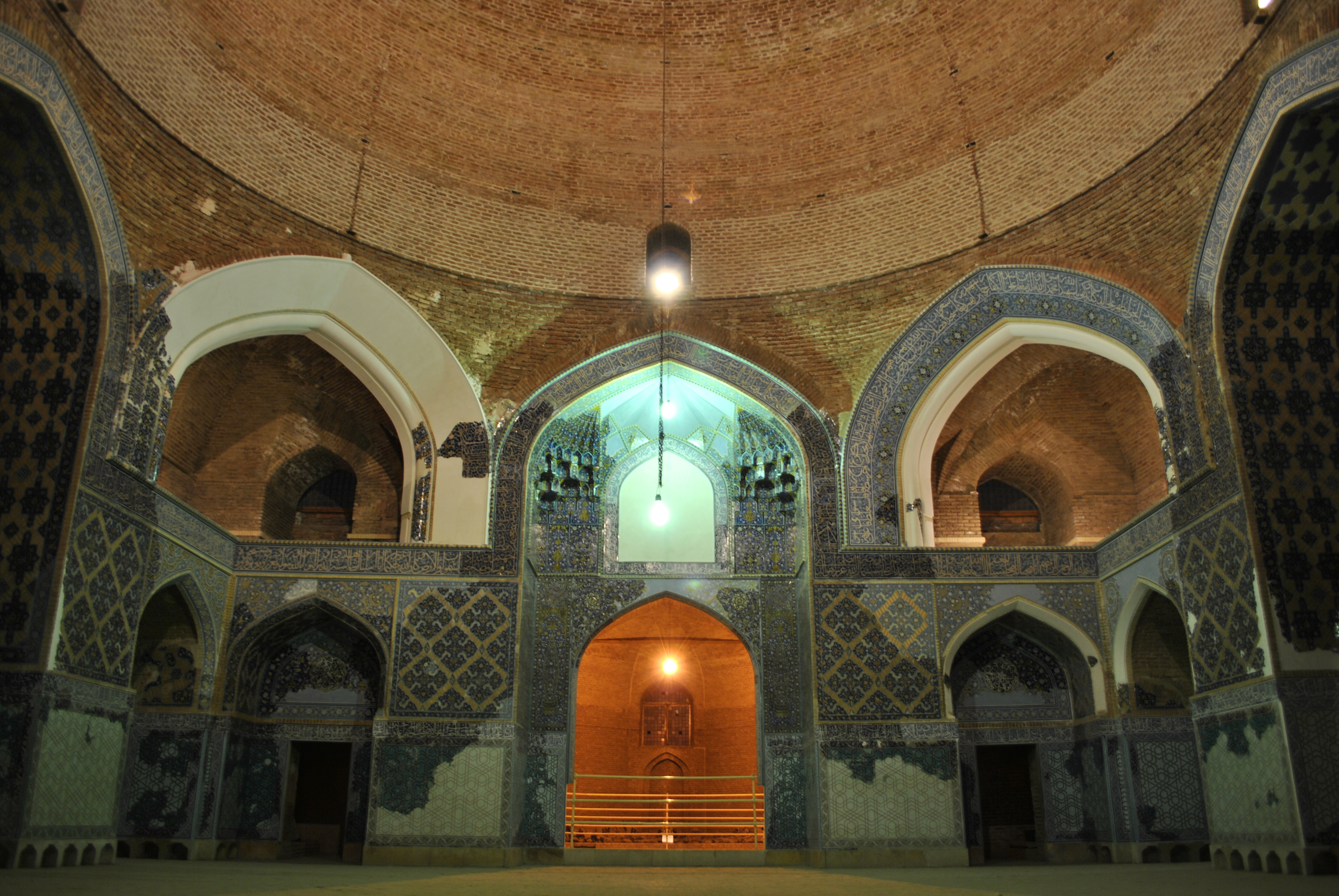
Interior (night)

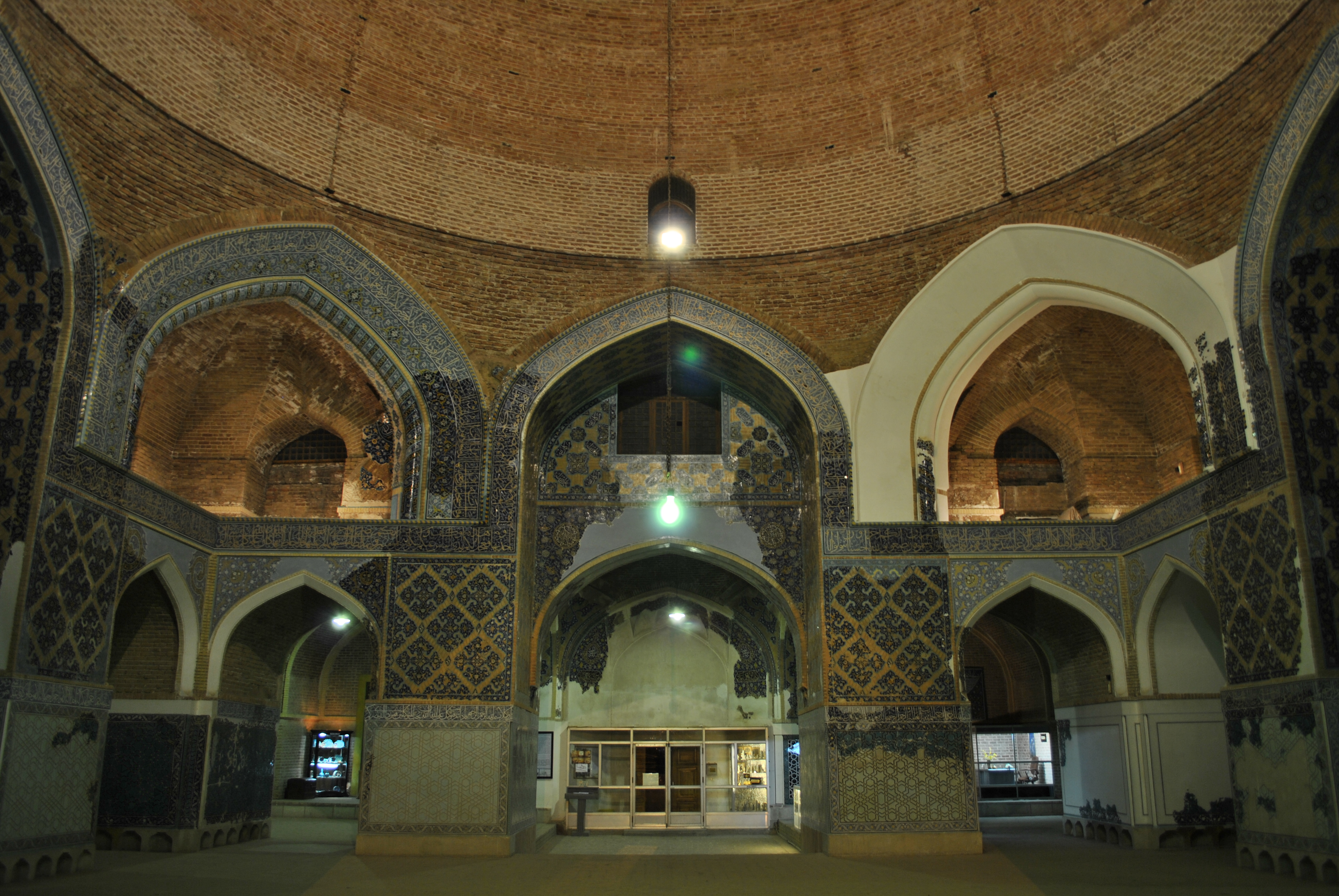
Interior (night)

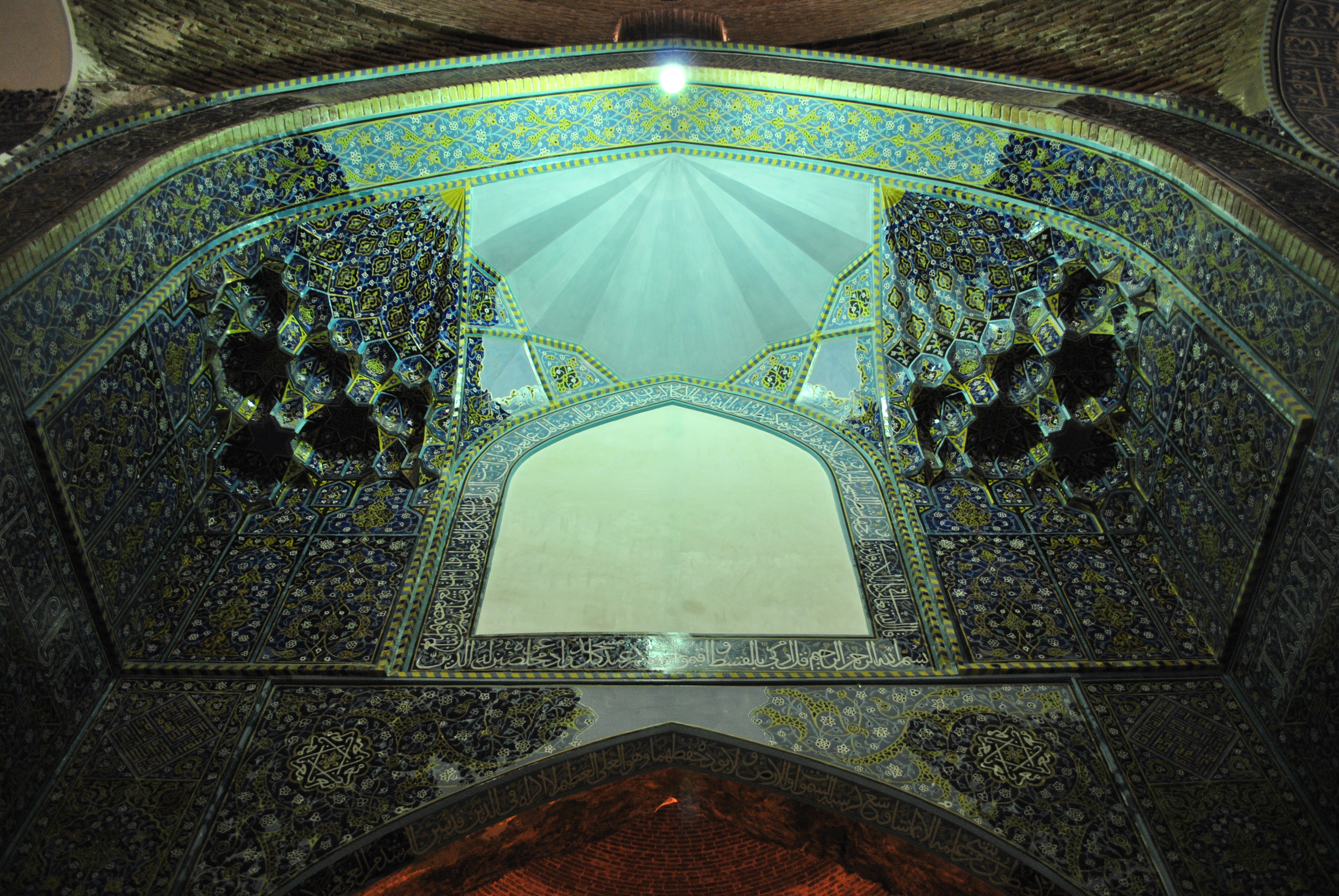
Interior (night)

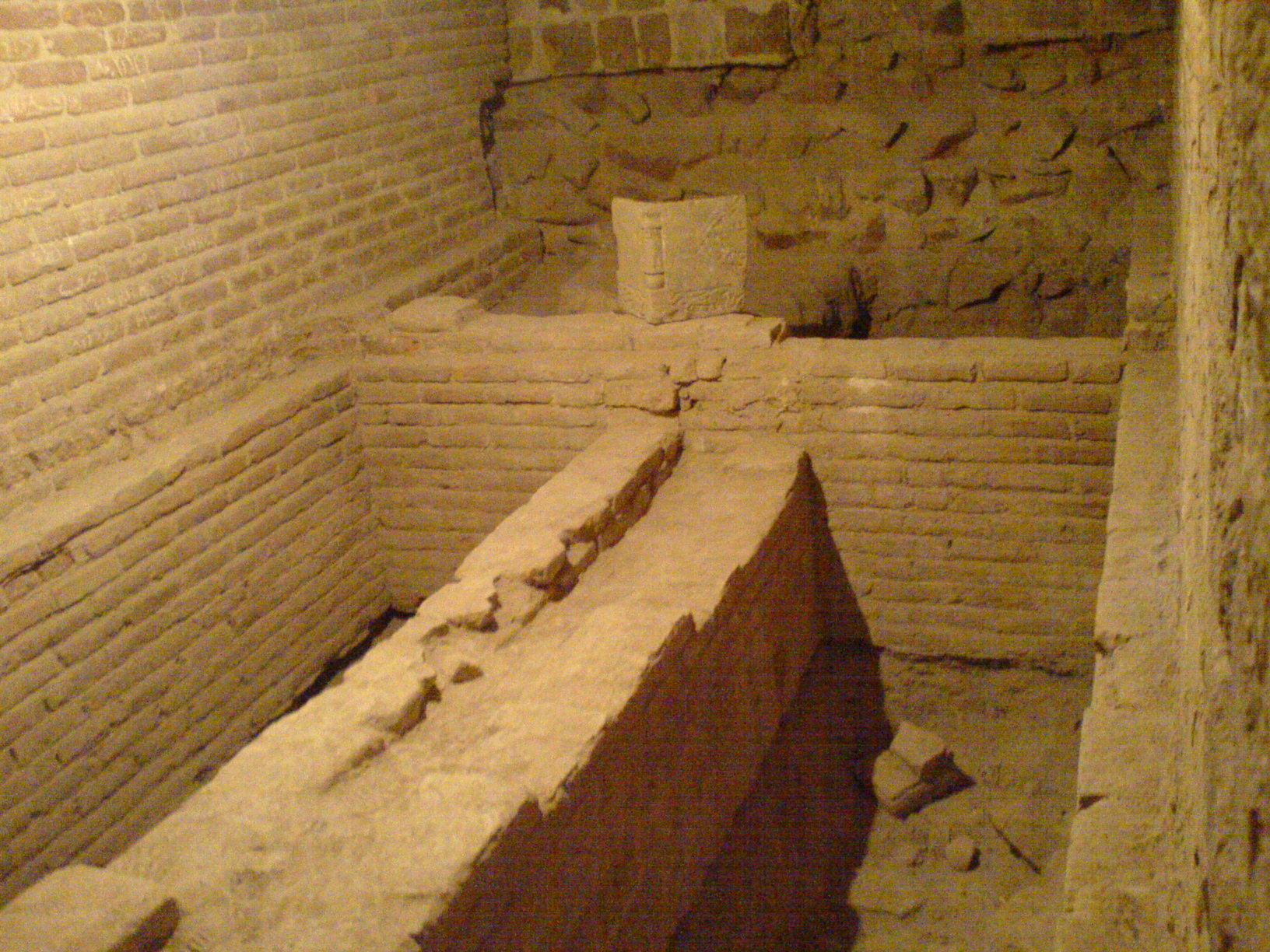
Tomb of Jahan Shah within the southern part of the mosque

The mosque before reconstruction

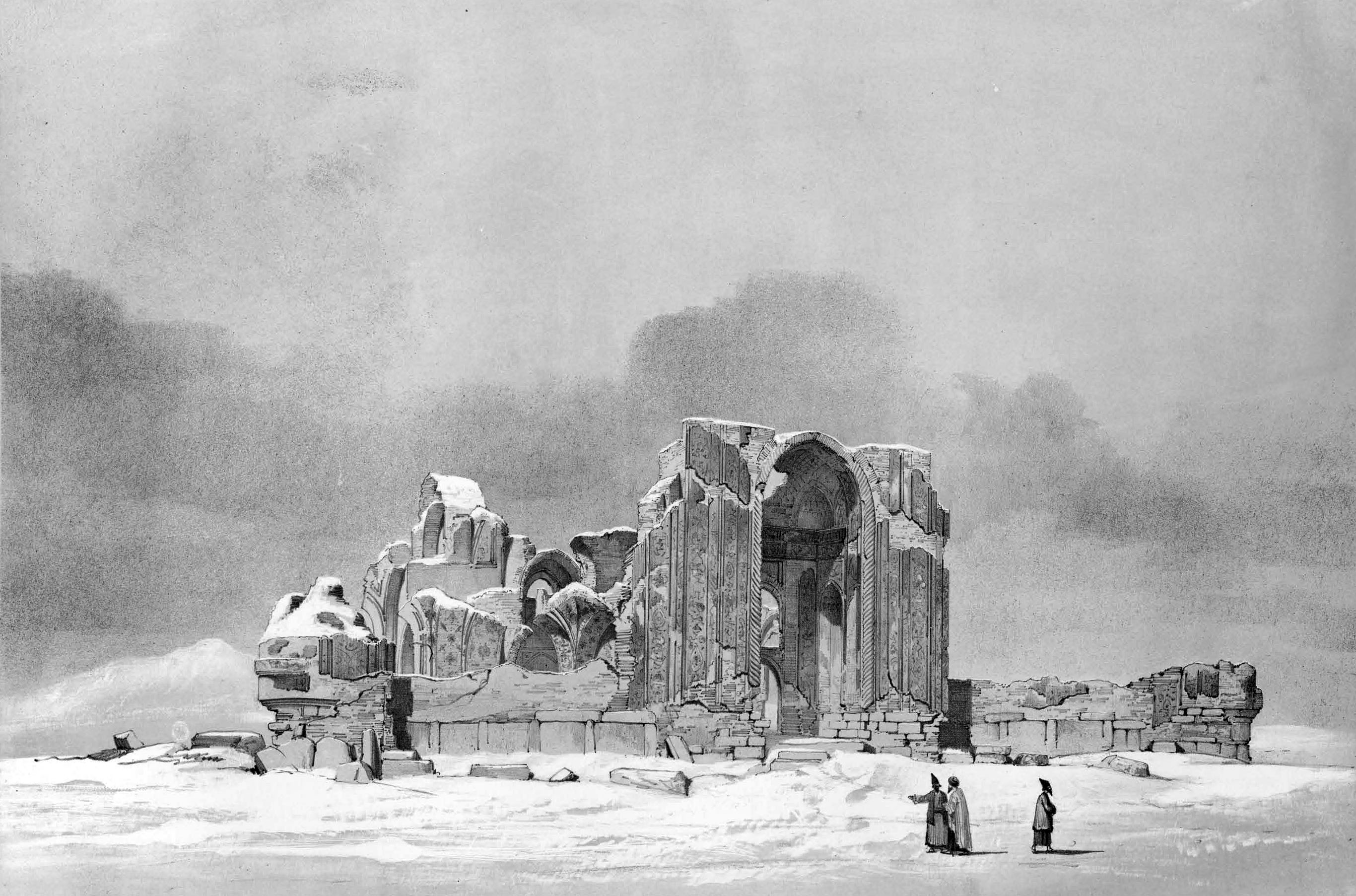
Ruins of the mosque, Eugène Flandin, 1841

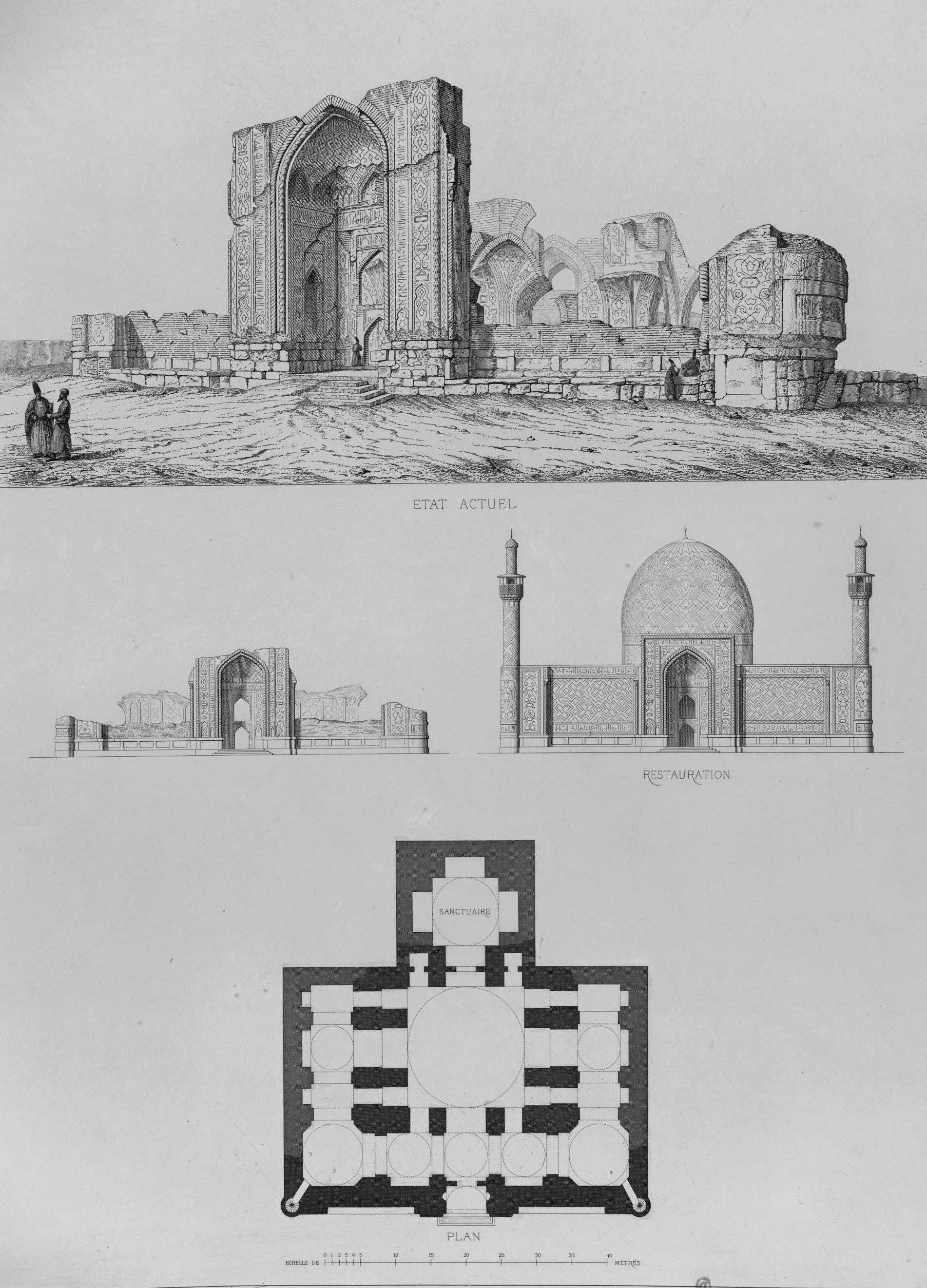
A 19th century sketch of the mosque

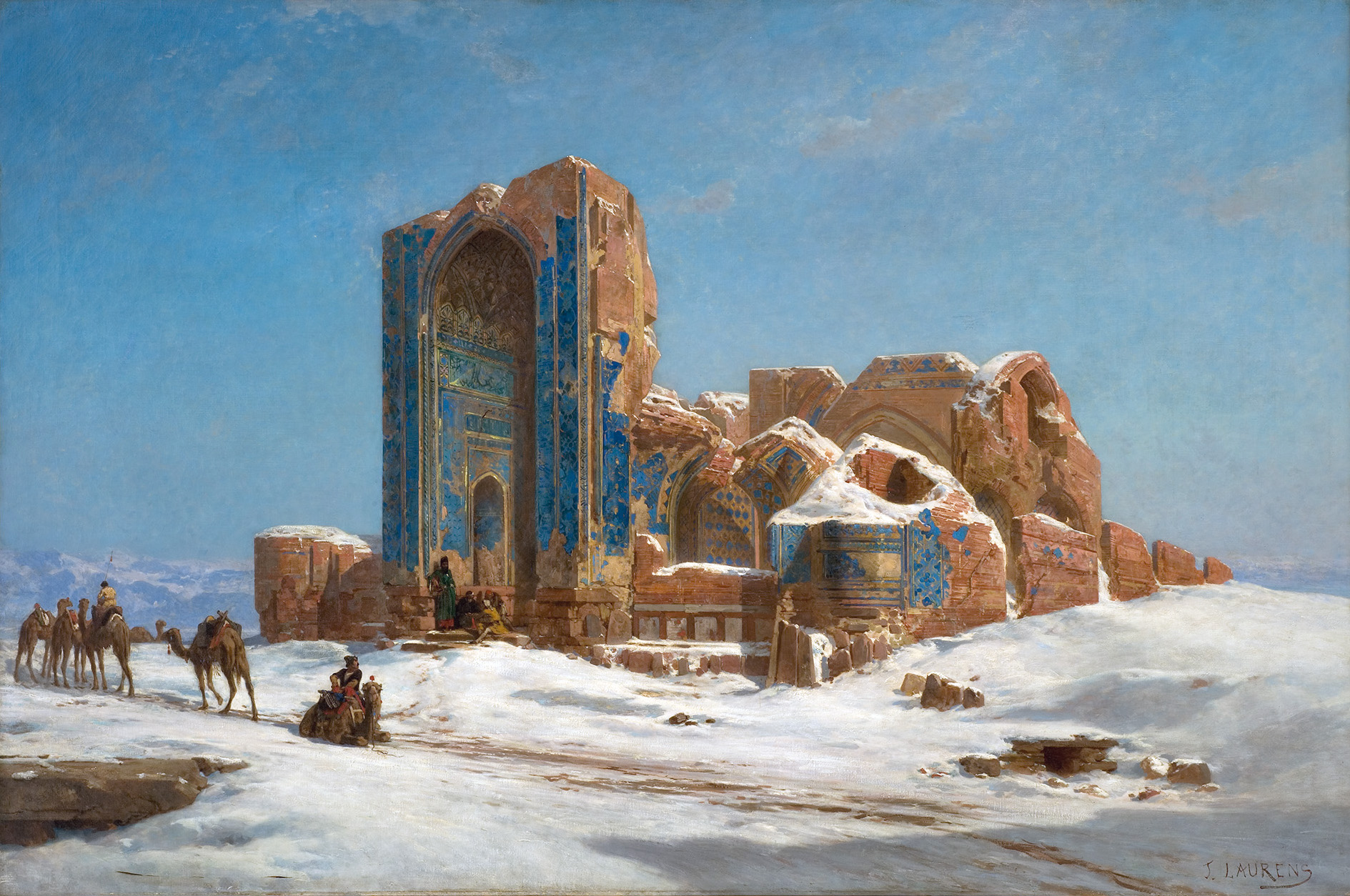
An 1872 painting of the mosque by Jules Laurens, a French tourist

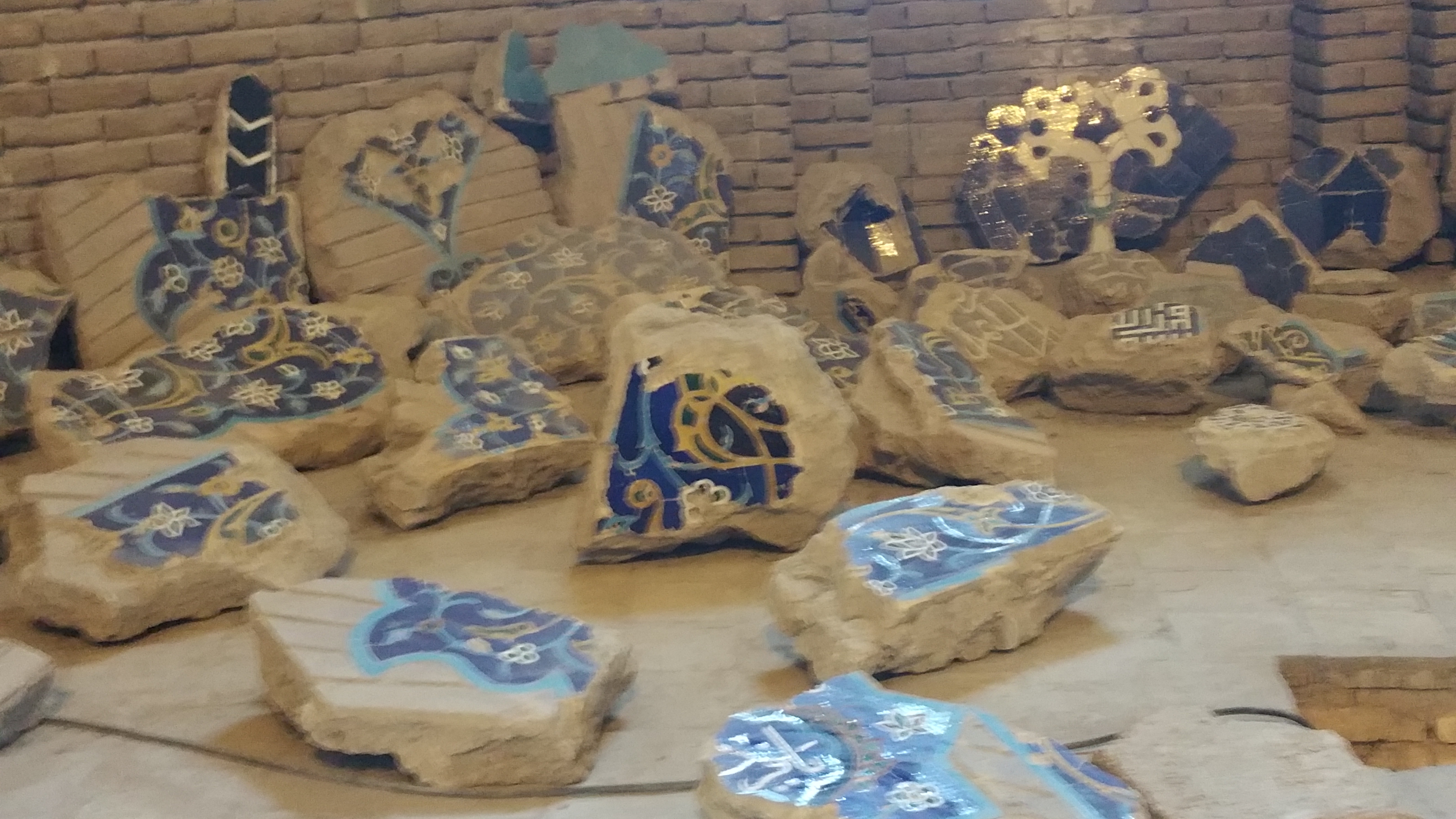
Remnants of the original tiling that were broken during an earthquake, displayed in the southern shabistan of the mosque

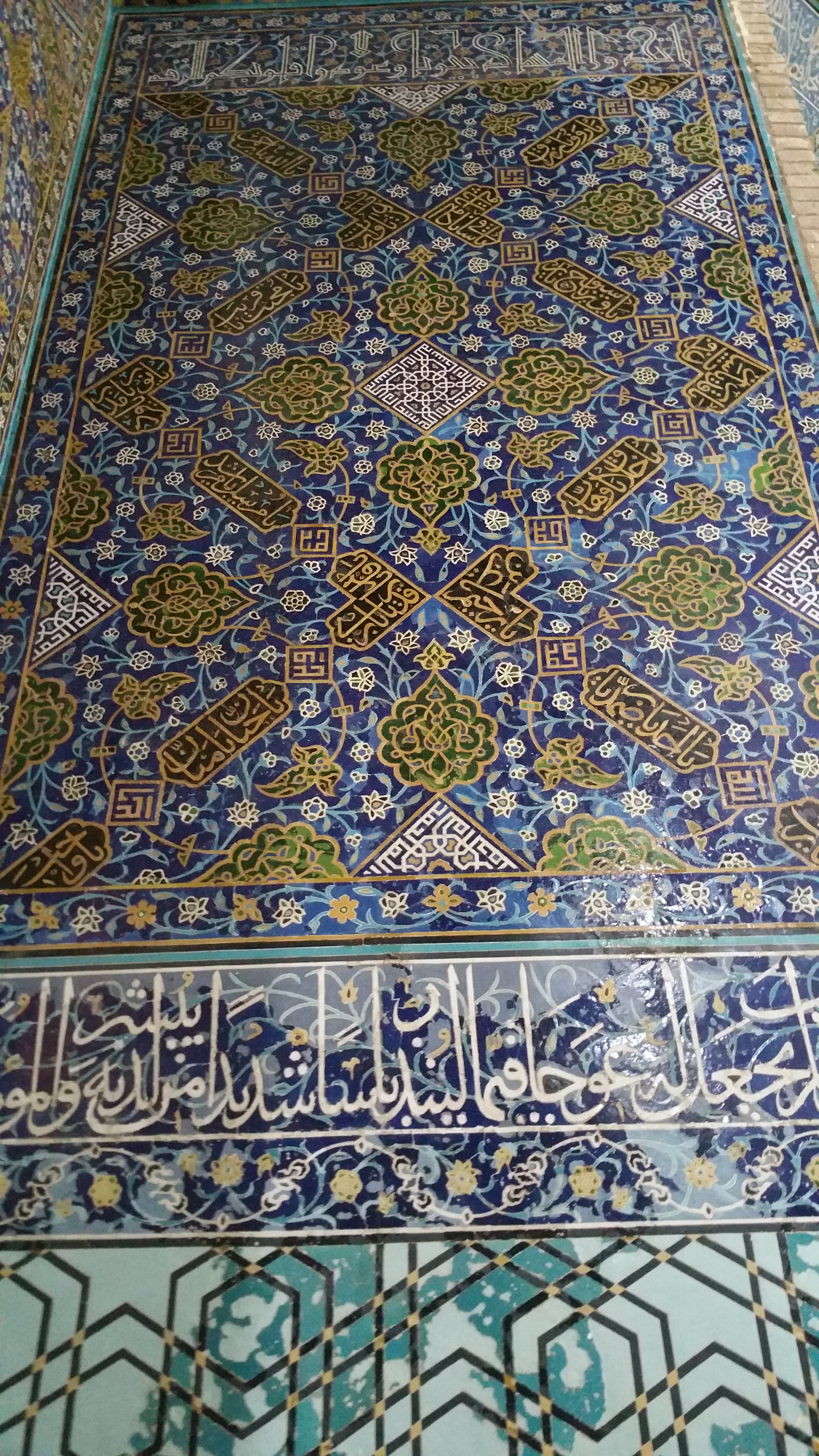
Tiles on one of the mosque walls

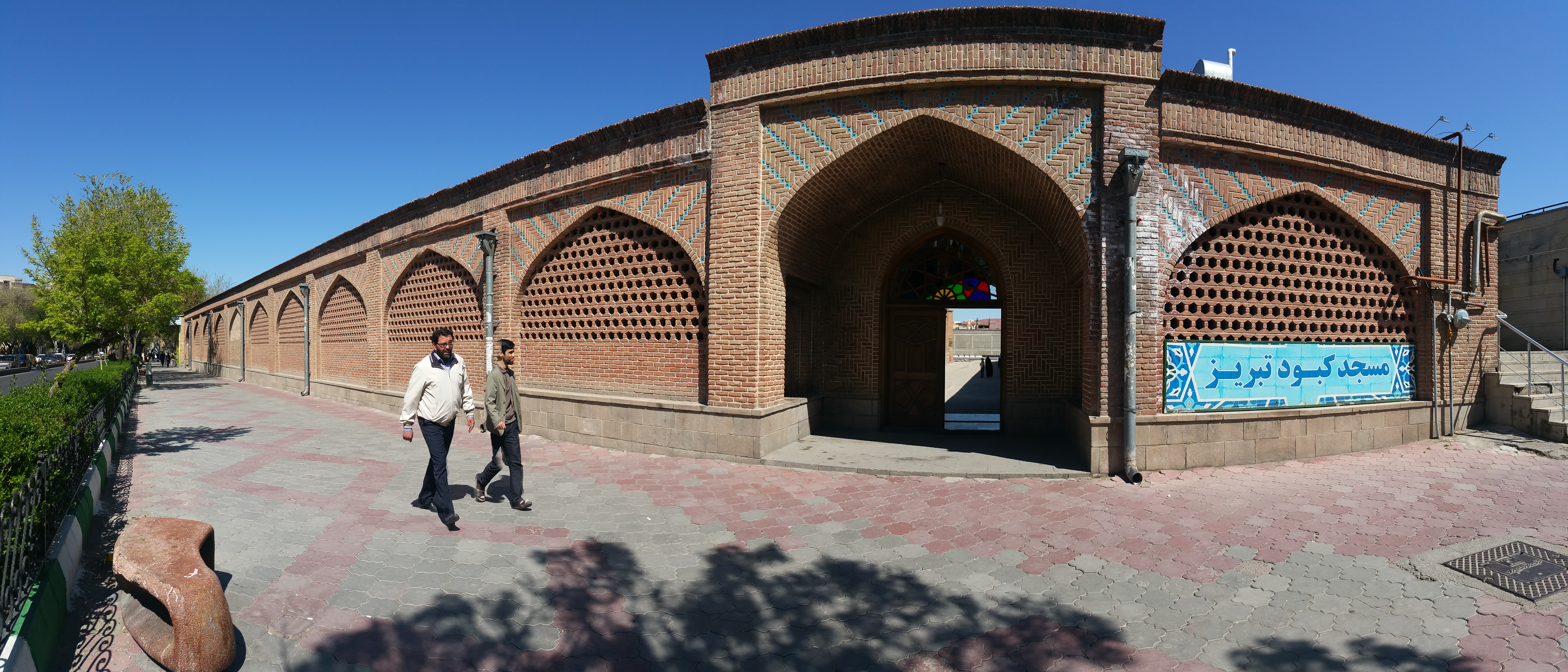
Panoramic view of the mosque's entrance

== See also ==
- Islam in Iran
- List of mosques in Iran
- Khaqani Park
- Persian domes
