= Ishratkhana Mausoleum =

- Ishratxona
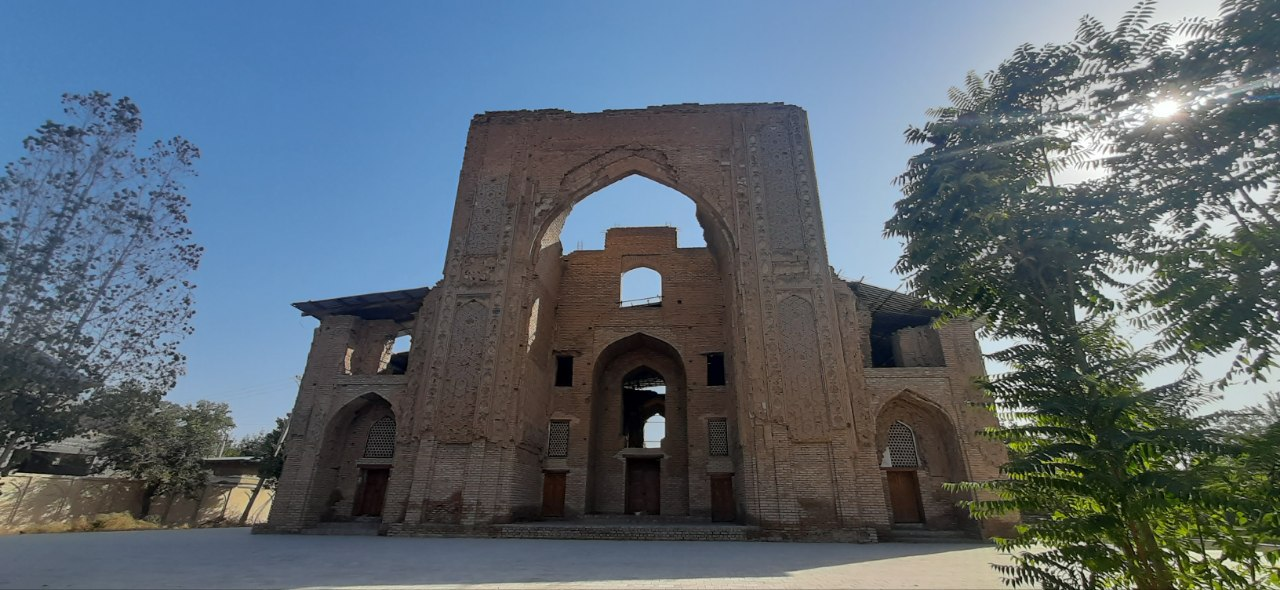
- Front view of the mausoleum
- Interactive map of the Ishratkhana Mausoleum area

General information
- Architectural style: Timurid
- Location: Sadriddin Ayni ko’chasi, Samarkand, Uzbekistan
- Coordinates: 39.6431°N 66.9910°E
- Year built: 1460s
- Completed: 1463

Technical details
- Material: Stone, wood, tiles
- Size: 30x22.4 m (plan of the Dilkusho pavilion)
- Floor count: 2

The Ishratkhana Mausoleum (Uzbek: Ishratxona maqbarasi) is an architectural monument-mausoleum in Samarkand, built during the reign of the Timurid ruler Abu Said (1451-1469). The building, apparently, was the burial place of the female members of the Timurid dynasty, as several female graves were discovered during the excavations in 1940. At present, the building is in ruins, and the dome and high drum were destroyed relatively recently - during the earthquake of 1903.

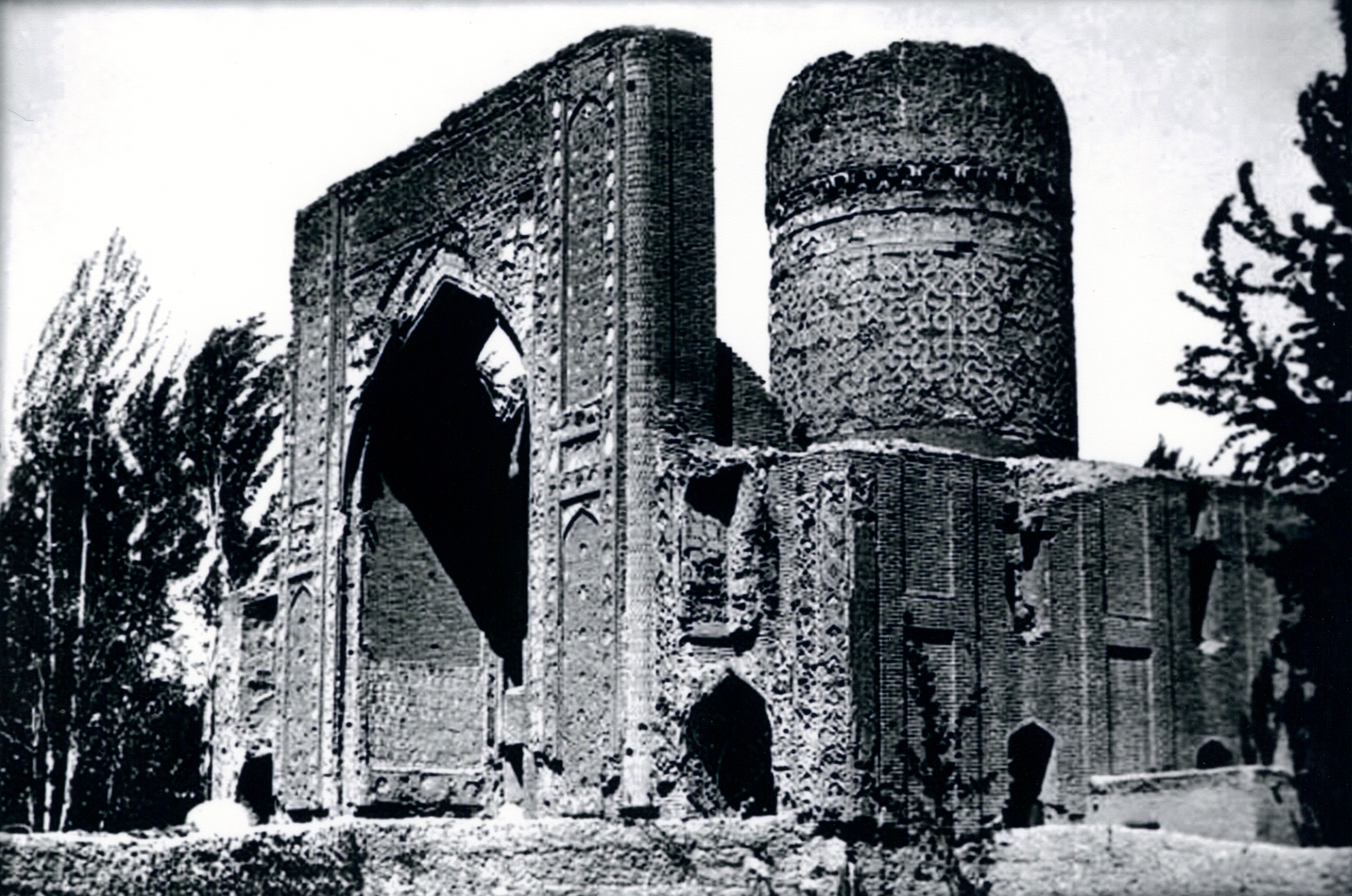
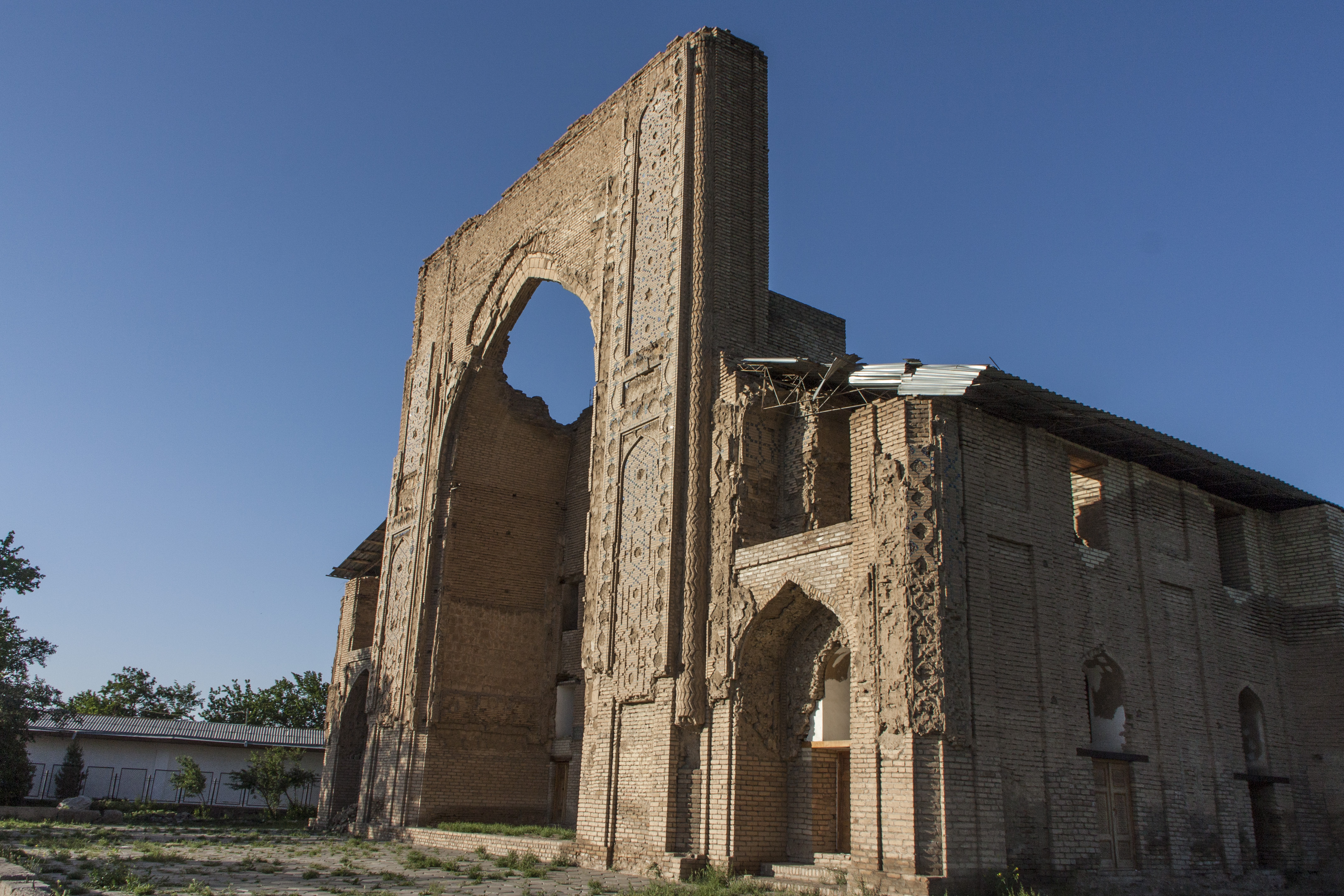
Historical image before the 1903 earthquake with its very tall drummed dome still standing, compared to today

== History ==
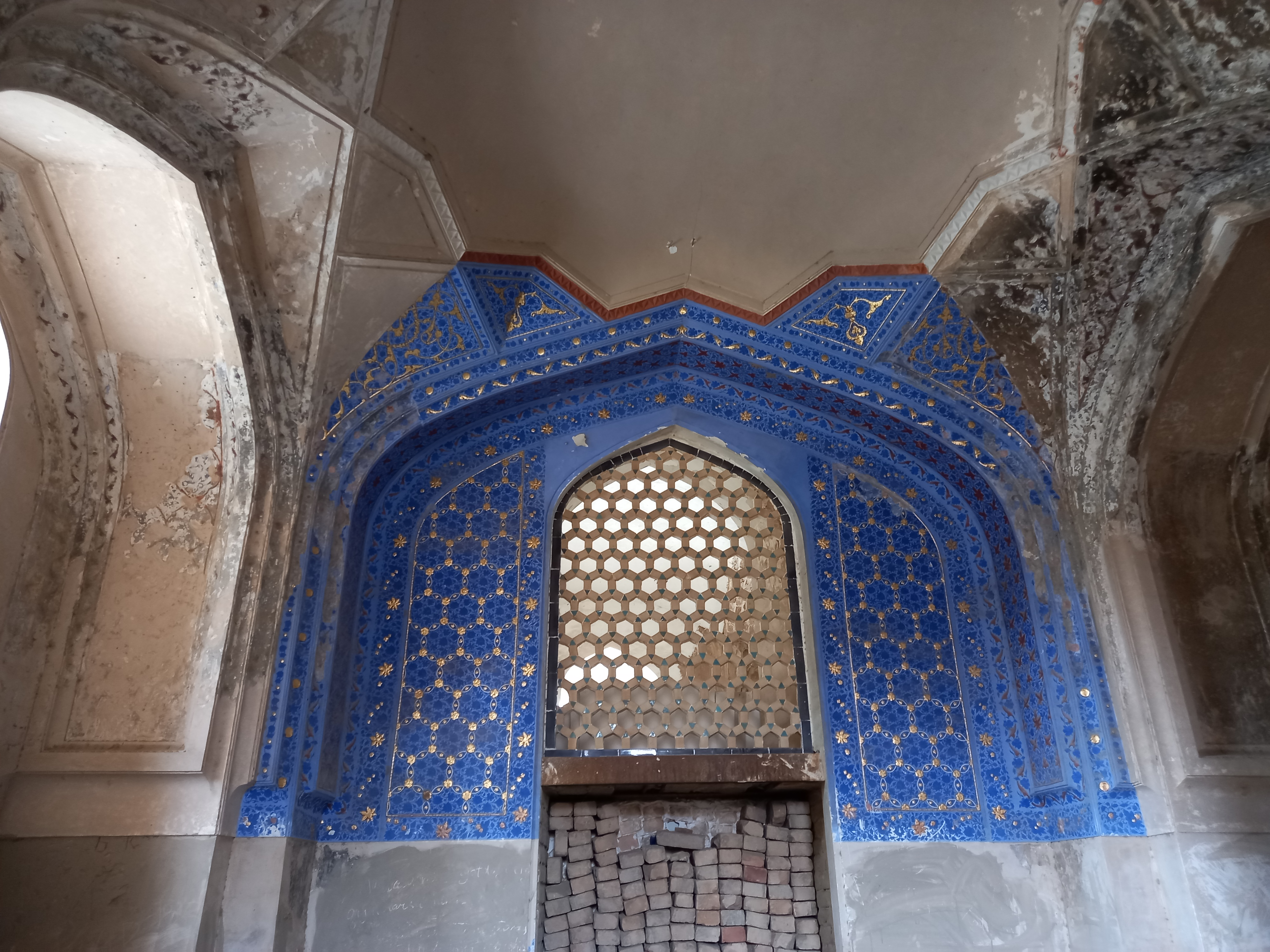
Partial restoration work

The first information about the Ishratkhana memorial was written in the work “Samariya” in the 1830s. According to the work, the Ishratkhana was founded by the daughter of Amir Jalaliddin - Habiba Sultan. In the middle of the 19th century, the topographer Yakovlev, a member of the Russian embassy in the Bukhara emirate, drew a map of the city of Samarkand and marked the building with a large conditional sign and the inscription “A building from the Timurid period” in the south-eastern direction from the fortress gate. Academician Vasily Bartold named the Ishratkhana “Nestorian memorial” when studying the city of Samarkand. A little later, archaeologist V. Vyatkin found an interesting document dating back to 1464 - a waqf document of the land area, slaves and various properties allocated for the preservation of the territory of Habiba Sultanbegim in Samarkand. The document was prepared with the participation of 60 palace officials of the ruler of Samarkand Sultan Abu Said. According to the waqf documents of the building, the consort of the Timurid ruler Abu Said, Habiba Sultan, erected a domed structure over the grave of her daughter, who died early, Malika Havand Sultanbegim. The mausoleum was built in a short period of time, namely 3–4 years. The construction work was completed in May 1463. Gradually, the spacious eight-sided area of the mausoleum turned into a family burial ground, where 23 women and children were buried. The name of the building means “Ishratkhana”, that is, “House of Joy and Pleasure” when translated from Persian. According to experts, this name is a mispronunciation of the word “Ashrat Khona”, which means “Ten Rooms” when translated from Arabic. The first archaeological excavations in the Ishratkhana area were carried out in 1939-1940 by academics Mikhail Masson and Galina Pugachenkova. As a result of archaeological research, it was found that the building was built on a large foundation with a depth of almost 5 meters. Also, the bodies of about 20 people were found under the Ishratkhana mausoleum. The Ishratkhana was built in the 15th century. The famous master craftsmen of that time took part in the construction of the palace. The Ishratkhana complex includes a mosque with a rich and modest interior, rooms for burial ceremonies and rooms for reading the funeral prayer on the 1st and 2nd floors. In the 16th century, the mausoleum fell into disrepair. In fact, the building was plundered. This was due to the intense construction that began in Samarkand in the 17th century. First, the Ishratkhana was separated from the marble panel. Because large slabs were needed for the Sherdor and Tillakori madrasahs being built on Registan Square. In addition, the marble tombstones were taken to the nearby Abdidarun cemetery and the old slabs were replaced with new marble ones.

== Naming ==
The name of the monument has been a matter of dispute since the first image of the mausoleum appeared in 1869. The popular name "Ishratkhana" (Persian: "House of Pleasure") was based on the Samarkand folklore of the 19th century, telling about a romantic encounter of Amir Timur, after which the great emir ordered to build a palace here. The name became firmly established in the academic literature and the lists of cultural heritage objects, both of the Uzbek SSR and the first years of independent Uzbekistan.

 "That high mausoleum, which is located to the north of the named mazar [Abdi-Darun] and is called by the people "Ishrat-khana", is the tomb of Sahib-i Dawlat-beki, founded by her mother Habiba Sultan-bekoy, the daughter of Amir Jalal-ed-din, who also built cells for the reciters of the Quran here"[9]

But in the early 21st century, this generally accepted name had opponents, who called to name the monument differently, citing the immorality of using the term "house of pleasure" for a mausoleum and suggesting an invented Arabic replacement for this name - "Ashratkhona", considering that the Arabic word "ashrat" means "ten", and all together ("Ashratkhona") can be translated as "10 rooms".

However, this polemic makes no sense, as it challenges the long-established popular name "Ishratkhona", and any attempts to fix a new name ("Ashratkhona") will encounter the lack of any documentary evidence.

In the document of 1464, the monument is called "the building under the dome of turquoise color... next to the mazar of Hoja Abdi Darun".

== Architecture ==
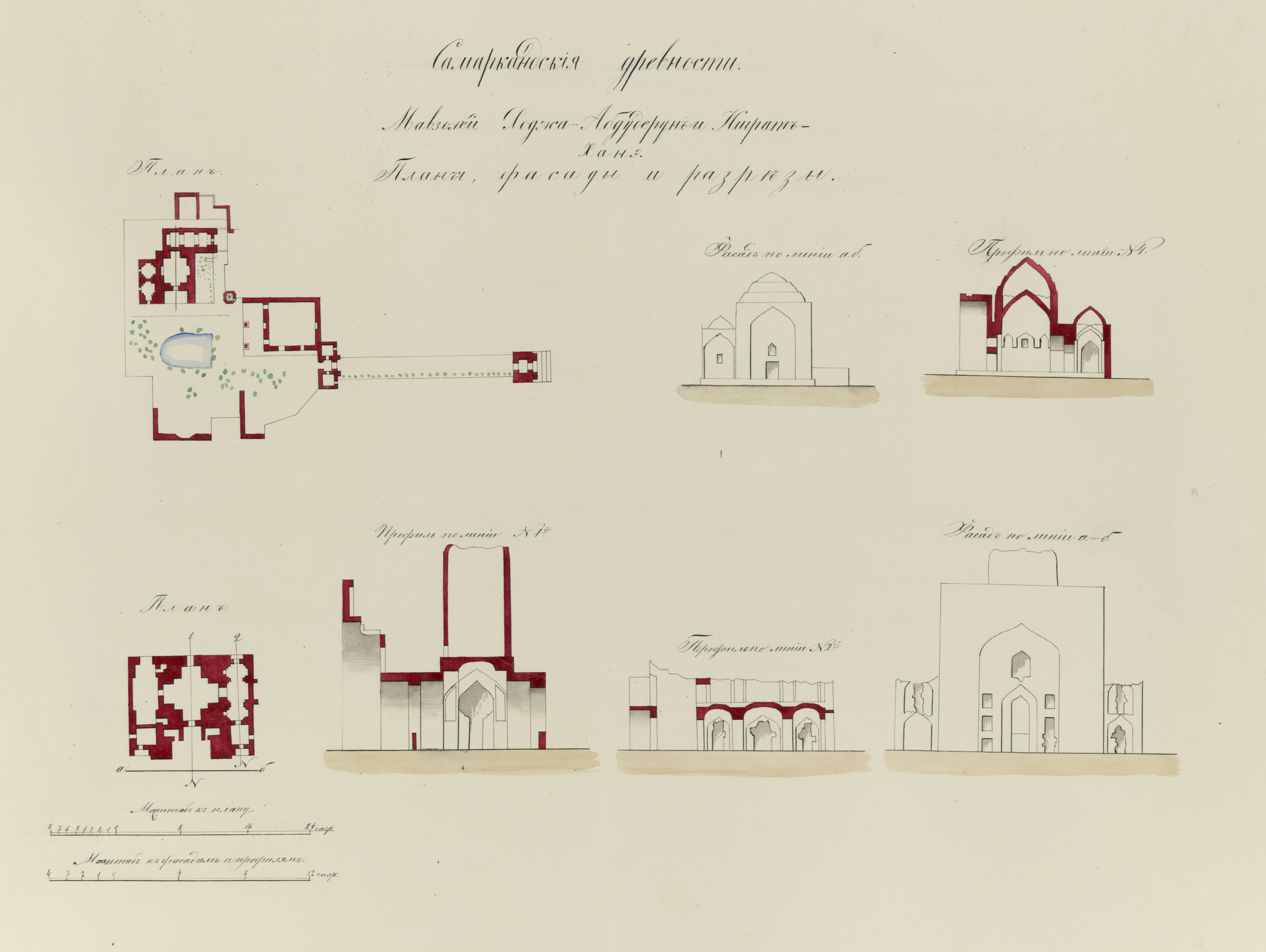
Plan of the Mausoleum

The elegant building - the Dilkusho pavilion (plan 30x22.4 meters) is surrounded by a high wall with two-storey rooms attached to the two wings of the portal. The facade is made of stone, the ornaments are made of carved wood, the domes are covered with turquoise and lapis lazuli tiles. The portal arch has another small arch inside, which has a carved facade. Two small doors and a gate lead inside. A large hall - the miyonsaroy (plan 8x8 meters) is accessed through a door on the side. From the north, it leads to a three-room palace. From the south, it leads to a long room with a niche (presumably, the pavilion mosque). The miyonsaroy has four circular towers at the outer corners, which lead to the upper floor rooms (cells) and the dome tomb. Under the miyonsaroy, there is an eight-chamber underground “sardoba” - a cellar where the palace property and food products were stored. The cellar facade is made of tiles and stone.

The miyonsaroy vault is very complex, consisting of intersecting arches and bell-shaped towers at the corners. The facade is decorated with tilework patterns, the top is covered with colorful floral patterns on a white background. Among them, a few protruding carnations make the room more elegant. The miyonsaroy is covered with a second dome on the outside. This dome is very graceful and lovely, as it is mounted on a high cylindrical drum. The drum surface is decorated with geometric tilework patterns. The dome is completely covered with turquoise tiles. The Islamic and geometric patterns, as well as the pearl-like ornaments on the dome, are considered unique gems in the national architectural heritage.

The vaulting of the interior dome was at the peak of architectural innovation for its era, using a complex lattice of shield-like nets consisting of triangular and diamond shaped squinches all atop a square within a Greek cross. This funnelled the weight of the dome onto the eight corner pillars, removing the need for bulky support walls, leaving a wide and spacious interior. This technique was already used in previous decades at Zayn ad-Din Masusoleum Taybad (1445), Gawhar Shad Mausoleum (1417) and the side rooms of Mausoleum of Khoja Ahmed Yasawi (1398); however, Ishratkhana took this to the zenith, building over 10 distinct styles of roofing in a single structure.

The remains of the Ishratkhana still look elegant and attractive, although they have lost a large part of it. Its high dome collapsed during the strong earthquake of 1903. The shape of the dome can be seen from a picture taken in 1872. The Ishratkhana building is one of the most famous and magnificent palaces built in Samarkand with special care and under the personal supervision of Amir Temur, and as the only surviving example, it occupies a special place in the history of Uzbek architecture.

== Gallery ==
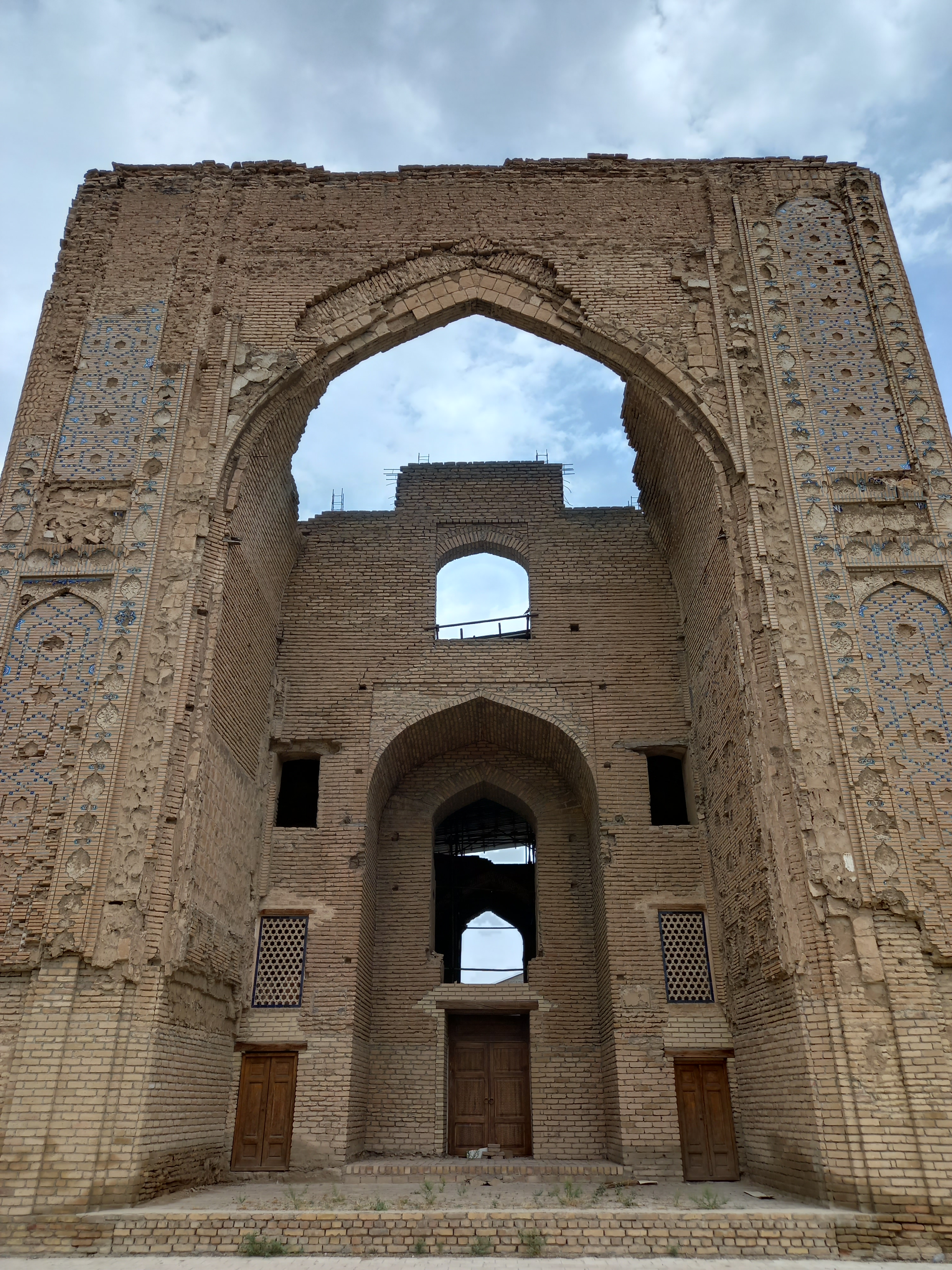
Iwan, only a little tilework remains

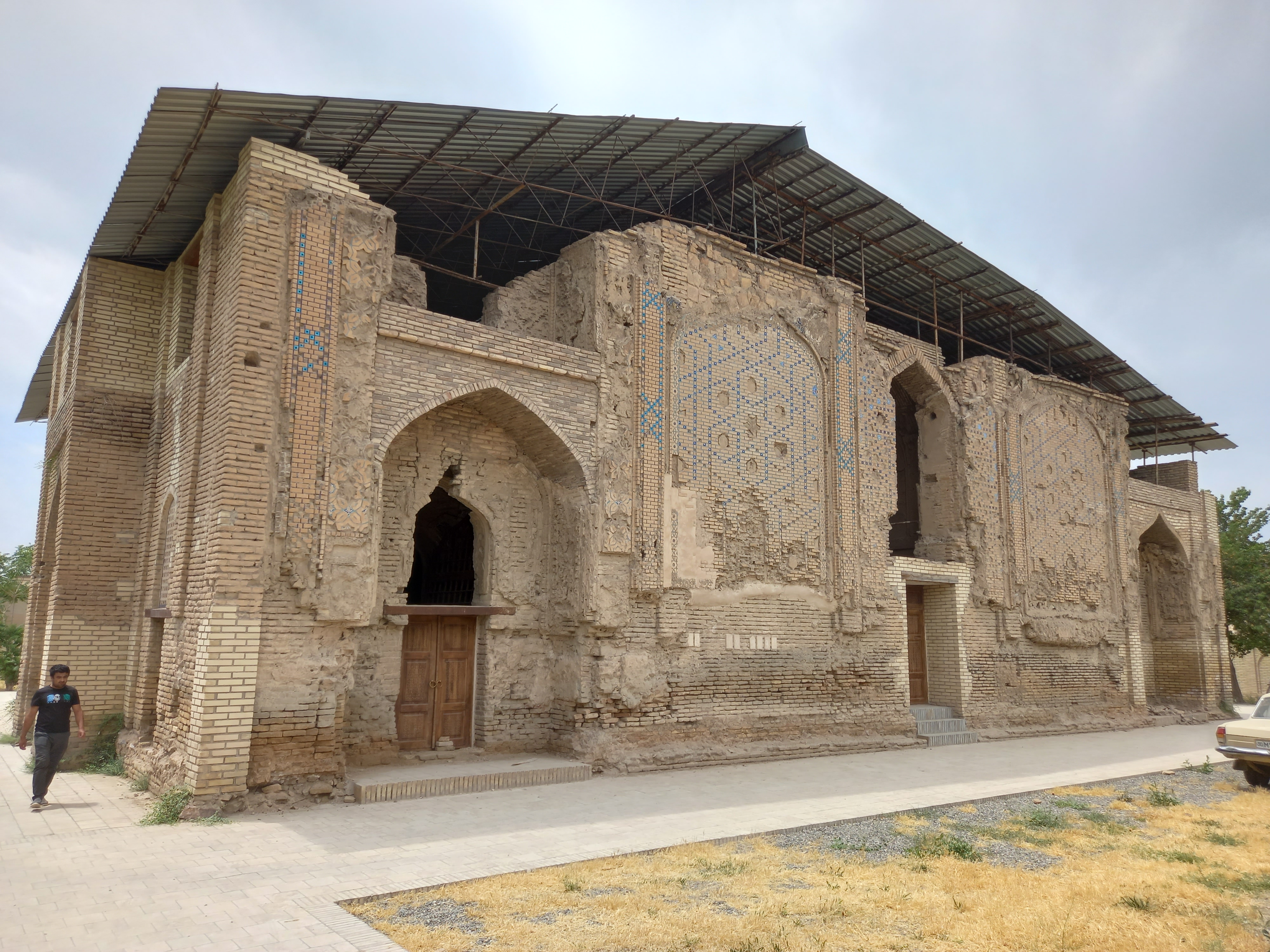
Rear of the building

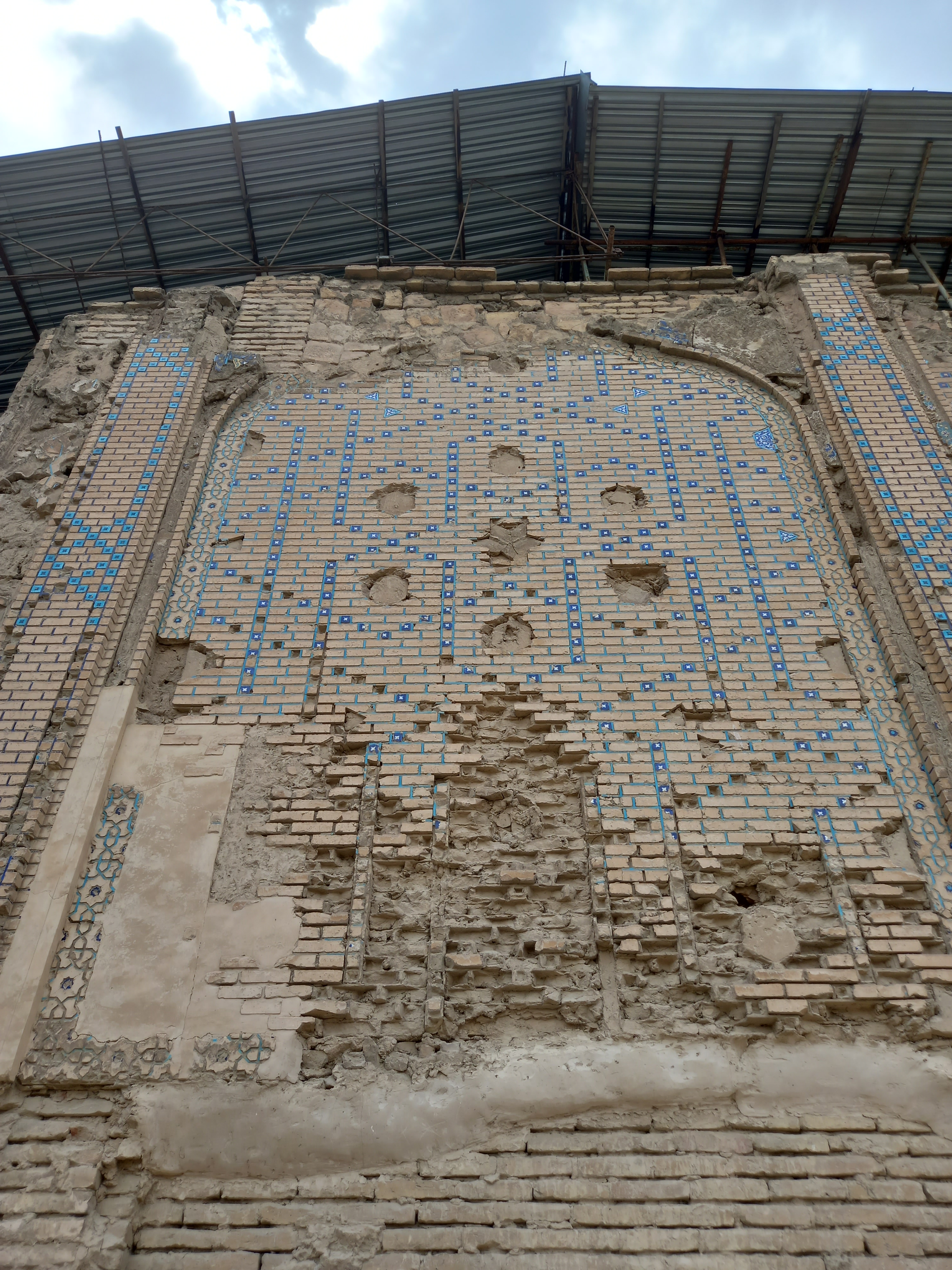
Surviving blue Mosaic on rear facade

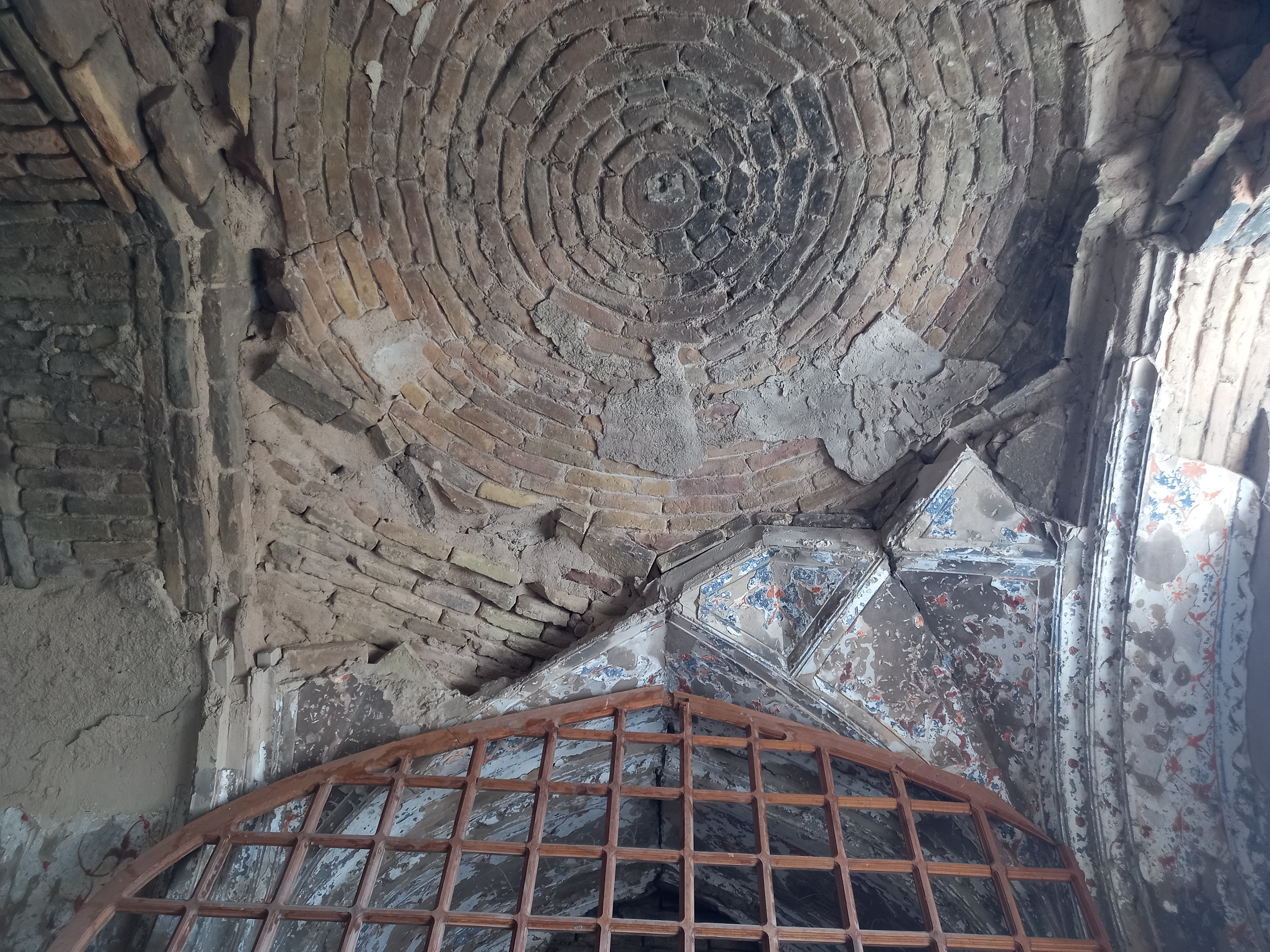
Domed chamber on right side of the structure.
